= List of churches in Greater Manchester =

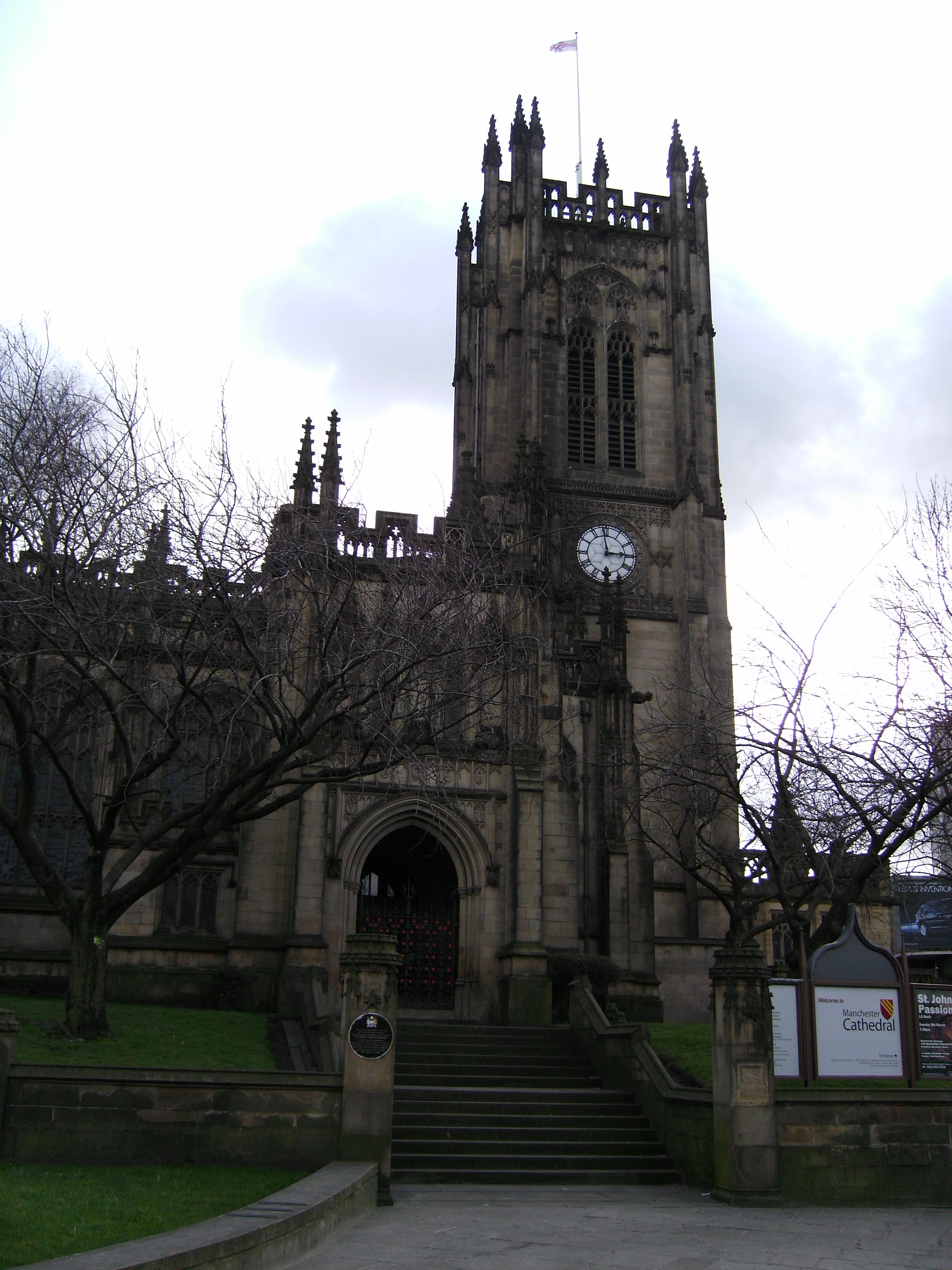
Manchester Cathedral is the seat of the Bishop of Manchester, and Mother Church of the Diocese of Manchester.

This is a partial list of churches in Greater Manchester, North West England, split according to metropolitan district. There is a mixture of Christian denominations in Greater Manchester, including churches aligned to Orthodox Christianity, Protestantism and Catholicism. Similarly, there is a range of ecclesiastical architecture.

== Bolton ==
Church	Image	Locality	Denomination	Completed	Ref.
St Peter		Bolton	Church of England	1871	
St Paul	St Paul's church, Astley Bridge, Bolton, England	Astley Bridge	Church of England	1848	
St Patrick	St Patrick's church, Bolton, England	Bolton	Roman Catholic	1861	
St Edmund	St Edmund's Church, Bolton, England	Bolton	Roman Catholic	1860	
St Peter and St Pauls		Bolton	Roman Catholic	1897	
St Maxentius		Bradshaw	Church of England	1872	
St James		Daisy Hill, Westhoughton	Church of England	1881	
St Philip's Church		Daubhill	Church of England	1911	
St Mary the Virgin		Deane	Church of England	Bef. 1100	
St Peter		Halliwell	Church of England	1840	
St Thomas		Halliwell	Church of England	1932	
St Margaret		Halliwell	Church of England	1939	
Holy Trinity		Horwich	Church of England	1903	
St Catherine		Horwich	Church of England	1889	
St Elizabeth		Horwich	Church of England		
Congregational Church		Kearsley	United Reformed Church		
Kearsley Mount		Kearsley	Methodist	1916	
New Jerusalem Church		Kearsley	The New Church	2007	
St John Fisher		Kearsley	Roman Catholic		
St Stephen		Kearsley	Church of England	1871	
Schoenstatt Shrine		Kearsley			
St Stephen and All Martyrs		Lever Bridge	Church of England	1844	
Christ Church		Little Lever	Methodist and United Reformed Church	1999	
Kingdom Hall		Little Lever	Jehovah's Witness		
King's Church		Little Lever	Charismatic Fellowship		
St Matthew		Little Lever	Church of England	1865	
St Teresa		Little Lever	Roman Catholic		
St Saviour		Ringley	Church of England	1854	
St Bartholomew		Westhoughton	Church of England	1870	
St John the Evangelist		Wingates, Westhoughton	Church of England	1859	
Bethel Church		Bolton	Evangelical	1991	

== Bury ==
Church	Image	Locality	Denomination	Completed	Ref.
Bury Baptist Church		Bury	Baptist Union of Great Britain	1970	
Bury Christian Fellowship		Bury	Non Denominational	1980	
Radcliffe Road Baptist Church, Bury		Bury	Grace Baptist Assembly	2004 (1836)	
Bolton Road Methodist Church		Elton	Methodist	2002	
St Mary the Virgin		Bury	Church of England	1876	
St Stephen		Elton	Church of England	1884	
St John the Baptist, Bircle		Bury	Church of England	1846	
St Paul		Bury	Church of England (now redundant)	1842	
St Mary the Virgin		Prestwich	Church of England	1895	
St Margaret		Prestwich	Church of England	1899	
Christ Church		Walshaw	Church of England	1892	
St. Hilda		Prestwich	Church of England	1922	
St. George		Simister	Church of England	1915	
St. Gabriel		Sedgley Park, Prestwich	Church of England	1933	
Our Lady of Grace		Prestwich	Roman Catholic	1931	
Prestwich Methodist Church		Prestwich	Methodist		
Heaton Park Methodist Church		Prestwich	Methodist		
St Mary		Radcliffe	Church of England	1817	
St Thomas and St John		Radcliffe	Church of England	1872	
Christ Church		Ramsbottom	Baptist Methodist		
Dundee United Reformed Church		Ramsbottom	United Reformed Church		
Edenfield Parish Church		Ramsbottom	Church of England	1778	
Edenfield Methodist Church		Ramsbottom	Methodist	1881	
Emmanuel Church Centre		Ramsbottom	Church of England		
Emmanuel Holcombe		Ramsbottom	Church of England		
Greenmount United Reformed Church		Ramsbottom	United Reformed Church		
Holcombe Brook Methodist Church		Ramsbottom	Methodist		
Ramsbottom Pentecostal Church		Ramsbottom	Pentecostal		
Ramsbottom Independent Evangelical Church		Ramsbottom	Evangelical		
St Andrew		Ramsbottom	Church of England	1834	
St Marie		Bury	Roman Catholic	1842	
St Mary		Hawkshaw	Church of England	1892	
St Joseph		Ramsbottom	Roman Catholic	1880	
St Paul		Ramsbottom	Church of England	1850	
St Philip		Stubbins	Church of England	1927	
St John in the Wilderness		Shuttleworth	Church of England	1847	
Holy Trinity		Bury	Church of England (now redundant)	1863	
St Peter		Bury	Church of England	1901	
St Thomas		Bury	Church of England	1866	

== Manchester ==
Church	Image	Locality	Denomination	Completed	Ref.
City Church Manchester		Manchester City Centre	Reformed Evangelical	2014	
Audacious Church	Front entrance of !Audacious Church, Manchester	Manchester City Centre	Assemblies of God	2007	
Trinity Methodist Church		Ancoats	Methodist	1964	
Chorlton Road United Reformed Church (formerly Chorlton Road Congregational Church; now demolished)	Colour photograph of Chorlton Road United Reformed Church			1861	
Christ Church Manchester		Manchester City Centre, Burnage, Fallowfield, Gorton & Withington	Charismatic Evangelical	2008	
Dickenson Rd Wesleyan Methodist Church (converted to a film studio in 1947 and demolished 1975)	church on a street	Rusholme	Wesleyan Methodist	1862	
St Ambrose of Milan		Barlow Moor	Roman Catholic	1958	
St Margaret		Burnage	Church of England	1926	
St Matthew		Castlefield	Church of England	1825	
St John the Evangelist		Cheetham	Church of England	1871	
Manchester International Church of Christ		Cheetham	International Church of Christ UK		
St Luke's Church		Cheetham	Church of England	1839	
Trinity United Church		Cheetham	United Reformed Church		
St Clement's Church, Chorlton-cum-Hardy		Chorlton-cum-Hardy	Church of England	1896	
St Werburgh		Chorlton-cum-Hardy	Church of England	1902	
Our Lady and St John		Chorlton-cum-Hardy	Roman Catholic	1927	
Redeemer Church		Chorlton-cum-Hardy	Evangelical	2017	
Holy Name of Jesus		Chorlton-on-Medlock	Roman Catholic	1926	
St Augustine		Chorlton-on-Medlock	Roman Catholic	1968	
Holy Trinity Armenian Church		Chorlton-on-Medlock	Armenian Apostolic Church	1870	
St Cross		Clayton	Church of England	1866	
Christ Church	Ccwd	West Didsbury	Church of England	1881	
Ebenezer Baptist Church		Newton Heath	Old Baptist Union	1903	
Emmanuel		Didsbury	Church of England	1858	
Ivy Church		Didsbury	Independent	1894	
St James		Didsbury	Church of England	1895	
St Paul		Didsbury	Methodist	1961	
Brookfield Unitarian Church		Gorton	Unitarian	1871	
St Francis		Gorton	Roman Catholic	1878	
St James		Gorton	Church of England	1871	
The Ascension		Hulme	Church of England	1970	
St George		Hulme	Church of England (redundant)	1828	
St Aidan		Levenshulme	Orthodox		
St Andrew		Levenshulme	Church of England (redundant)	1908	
Levenshulme Baptist Church		Levenshulme	Baptist		
Levenshulme Methodist Church		Levenshulme	Methodist	1864	
Levenshulme United Reformed Church		Levenshulme	United Reformed Church	1888	
St Mark		Levenshulme	Church of England	1908	
St Mary of the Angels and St Clare		Levenshulme	Roman Catholic	1975	
St Peter's (demolished 1907)		St Peter's Square, Manchester City Centre	Church of England	1794	
St Peter		Levenshulme	Church of England	1896	
Church of God (Seventh Day)		Longsight	Church of God (Seventh Day)		
St Joseph's		Longsight	Roman Catholic	1915	
Jubilee Church Manchester RCCG		Longsight	Pentecostal	2002	
Roby United Reformed Church		Longsight	United Reformed Church	1972	
Manchester Central		Manchester City Centre	Salvation Army	1879	
Cross Street Chapel		Manchester City Centre	Unitarian	1997	
Manchester Cathedral		Manchester City Centre	Church of England	1940	
Manchester Vineyard		Manchester City Centre	Vineyard		
St Ann		Manchester City Centre	Church of England	1891	
St Mary (The Hidden Gem)		Manchester City Centre	Roman Catholic	1848	
King's Church		Manchester City Centre, Swinton and Wythenshawe	Evangelical	1970	
St Mary		Manchester City Centre	Church of England	1756	
Grace Church Manchester		Manchester	Evangelical	2005	
The Apostles and Saint Cuthbert		Miles Platting	Church of England		
Corpus Christi		Miles Platting	Roman Catholic	1907	
Christ Church		Moss Side	Church of England	1904	
All Saints		Newton Heath	Church of England	1880	
St Wilfrid and St Ann		Newton Heath	Church of England (redundant)	1909	
St Wilfrid		Northenden	Church of England	1876	
St Clement's Church Manchester		Openshaw	Church of England	1880	
Holy Trinity		Rusholme	Church of England	1850	
St Chrysostom		Victoria Park	Church of England	1877	
St Paul's		Withington	Church of England	1841	

== Oldham ==
Church	Image	Locality	Denomination	Completed	Ref.
Oldham Parish Church of St Mary with St Peter		Oldham	Church of England	1830	
St James		Crompton	Church of England	1845	
St Saviours		East Crompton	Church of England	1908	
Holy Trinity Church, Shaw		Shaw	Church of England	1871	
St Mary		High Crompton	Church of England	1880	
Shore Edge Methodist Church		Shaw and Crompton	Methodist	1873	
St Andrew's		Shaw and Crompton	Methodist		
St Paul's		Shaw	Methodist	1863	
Shaw United Reformed Church		Shaw and Crompton	United Reformed Church	1885	
St Joseph Roman Catholic Church		Shaw and Crompton	Roman Catholic	1870	
Salvation Army Church		Shaw and Crompton	Salvation Army	1896	
St Mark with Christchurch		Glodwick, Oldham	Church of England	1876	
Bardsley, Holy Trinity		Oldham	Church of England	1844	
Woodhouses National School Mission Church		Bardsley, Oldham	Church of England		
Christ Church		Chadderton	Church of England		
Emmanuel		Chadderton	Church of England		
St George		Chadderton	Church of England		
St Luke		Chadderton	Church of England	1888	
St Mark		Chadderton	Church of England	1963	
St Matthew		Chadderton	Church of England	1857	
St Saviour's Mission Church		Chadderton	Church of England		
Holy Trinity		Coldhurst, Oldham	Church of England		
Denshaw, Christ Church		Saddleworth	Church of England		
Holy Trinity		Dobcross, Saddleworth	Church of England		
New Life Church		Failsworth	Assemblies of God		
Holy Trinity		Failsworth	Church of England		
St John the Evangelist		Failsworth	Church of England	1846	
The Holy Family		Failsworth	Church of England		
St Cuthbert's Mission Church		Fitton Hill	Church of England		
St Hilda		Friarmere, Saddleworth	Church of England		
St Thomas		Friarmere, Saddleworth	Church of England		
Friezland Christ Church		Saddleworth	Church of England		
Christ Church		Glodwick	Church of England		
St Mary		Greenfield	Church of England		
St John the Baptist		Oldham	Church of England		
St Mark		Heyside	Church of England		
St Margaret		Hollinwood	Church of England	1879	
Knoll's Lane St Agnes			Church of England		
St Thomas		Lees	Church of England	1848	
St Chad		Limeside	Church of England		
St Anne		Lydgate	Church of England		
St John		Oldham	Church of England		
St Stephen & All Martyrs		Oldham	Church of England		
St Thomas		Moorside	Church of England	1872	
St Ambrose		Oldham	Church of England		
St Andrew		Oldham	Church of England		
St Barnabas		Clarksfield	Church of England		
St James		Oldham	Church of England	1835	
St Paul		Oldham	Church of England		
St Peter		Oldham	Church of England		
St Matthew and Aiden		Oldham	Church of England		
St Anne		Royton	Church of England		
St Paul		Royton	Church of England		
St Chad		Uppermill	Church of England	1831–1833	
St Paul		Scouthead	Church of England	1889	
Holy Trinity		Waterhead	Church of England	1847	
St Thomas, Werneth		Oldham	Church of England		
Abbeyhills Congregational Church		Oldham	Congregational		
Bardsley Methodist Church		Oldham	Methodist		
Chadderton Congregational Church		Chadderton	Congregational		
Chadderton Way Gospel Mission		Chadderton			
Corpus Christi Church		Chadderton			
St Herbert		Chadderton	Roman Catholic		
Delph Independent Chapel		Saddleworth			
Delph Methodist Chapel		Saddleworth	Methodist		
East Oldham Methodist Church		Oldham	Methodist		
Failsworth Salvation Army		Failsworth	Salvation Army		
Bethel Chapel		Failsworth			
Church of the Holy Family		Failsworth			
Dob Lane Chapel		Failsworth			
Evangel Church		Failsworth			
Hope Methodist Church		Failsworth	Methodist		
Kingdom Hall		Failsworth			
New Jerusalem Church		Failsworth			
St Mary		Failsworth	Roman Catholic		
St Melangell		Failsworth	Orthodox		
Fir Lane Methodist Church			Methodist		
Glodwick Baptist Church		Oldham	Baptist		
Gravel Hole Methodist Church		Royton			
Greenacres Chapel		Oldham			
Greenacres Independent Methodist Church		Oldham	Methodist		
Grosvenor Hall					
Healds Green Methodist Church			Methodist		
Hollinwood Beulah Baptist/United Reformed Church		Oldham	Baptist/United Reformed Church		
Hollinwood United Reformed Church		Oldham	United Reformed Church		
Hope Chapel		Oldham			
Christian Brethren Congregation		Lees			
St Edward's Church		Lees	Roman Catholic		
Zion Methodist Chapel		Lees	Methodist		
Limeside Methodist Church		Oldham	Methodist		
Macedonia United Reformed Church		Failsworth, Oldham	United Reformed		
Mill Gate Methodist Chapel			Methodist		
Moorside Methodist Church		Oldham	Methodist		
Mount Pleasant Mission		Oldham			
Northmoor Methodist Church		Oldham	Methodist		
Oldham Edge St Mary		Oldham			
Ashton Road Congregational Church		Oldham	Congregational		
Assemblies of God		Oldham			
Chamber Road Independent Methodist Church		Oldham	Methodist		
Church of the Holy Rosary		Oldham	Roman Catholic		
Church of the Nazarene		Oldham	Church of the Nazarene		
Church of the Sacred Heart		Oldham			
Cook Street, St Anne's Church		Oldham			
Copster Hill Road, Salvation Army Citadel		Oldham			
Bharat Bhavan		Oldham			
Foundry Street, Kingdom Hall		Oldham			
Garforth Street, Methodist Church		Oldham			
Holy Family Church		Oldham			
Honeywell Lane, Methodist Church		Oldham	Methodist		
Oldham Baptist Church		Oldham	Baptist		
King Street Unitarian Chapel		Oldham			
King Street, United Reformed Church		Oldham			
Shree Swaminarayam Temple		Oldham			
Lees Road Salvation Army Hall		Oldham			
Manchester Road Salvation Army Hall		Oldham			
Our Lady & St Patrick		Oldham			
Church of Jesus Christ of Latterday Saints		Oldham			
St Peter & St Paul Ukrainian Catholic Church		Oldham	Roman Catholic		
St James Free Church of England		Oldham			
Union Street Methodist Church		Oldham			
Union Street United Reformed Church		Oldham			
St Michael's Church		Oldham			
Bethel Church		Oldham			
Methodist Church		Oldham			
United Reformed Church		Oldham			
Ripponden Road Methodist Chapel		Oldham			
Road End Methodist Chapel		Oldham			
Roundthorn Methodist Church		Oldham			
Bethesda Baptist Church		Royton			
Heyside United Reformed Church		Royton			
Kingdom Hall		Royton			
SS Aidan & Oswald		Royton			
Trinity Methodist Church		Royton	Methodist		
Salem Moravian Chapel		Oldham			
South Chadderton Methodist Church		Chadderton		1970	
Springhead Congregational Church		Saddleworth			
Church of the Sacred Heart & St William		Saddleworth			
Ebenezer Congregational Church, Uppermill		Saddleworth			
Uppermill Methodist Chapel		Saddleworth			
Weakey Methodist Chapel					
Gospel Hall		Werneth, Oldham			
Westwood Moravian Church		Westwood, Oldham	Moravian	1869	
Farrow St Salvation Army		Shaw	Salvation Army	1896	

== Rochdale ==
Church	Image	Locality	Denomination	Completed	Ref.
Branches Christian Fellowship		Rochdale	Christian		
Grace Fellowship Manchester		Middleton	Independent evangelical		
St Barnabas		Littleborough	Church of England		
St Mary's		Littleborough	Roman Catholic		
Holy Trinity		Littleborough	Church of England		
Middleton Parish Church of St Leonard		Middleton	Church of England	1524/1667	
St Michael's Church		Middleton	Church of England	1930	
Rochdale Parish Church of St Chad		Rochdale	Church of England		
Ashworth, St James		Rochdale	Church of England		
Bamford, St Michael		Heywood	Church of England		
St Lukes		Heywood	Church of England		
Calderbrook, St James		Littleborough	Church of England		
Hamer, All Saints		Rochdale	Church of England		
Kirkholt, St Thomas		Rochdale	Church of England		
Milnrow, St James		Milnrow	Church of England		
Newhey, St Thomas		Newhey	Church of England		
Oakenrod, St George		Rochdale	Church of England		
Spotland, St Clement		Rochdale	Church of England		
Wardleworth, St Mary with St James		Rochdale	Church of England		
Balderstone, St Mary		Rochdale	Church of England		
Belfield, St Ann		Rochdale	Church of England		
Dearnley, St Andrew		Rochdale	Church of England		
Falinge, St Edmund		Rochdale	Church of England		
Healey, Christ Church		Rochdale	Church of England		
Newbold, St Peter		Rochdale	Church of England		
Norden, St Paul		Rochdale	Church of England		
Rochdale, St Aidan, Sudden		Rochdale	Church of England		
Rochdale, St Luke, Deeplish		Rochdale	Church of England		
Smallbridge, St John the Baptist		Rochdale	Church of England	1834	
Wardle, St James Apostle		Rochdale	Church of England		
Moore Street Congregational Church		Rochdale	Congregational	1829	
Baptist Church, Deeplish		Rochdale	Nonconformist		
St John the Baptist Catholic Church		Rochdale	Roman Catholic		
Spotland Methodist Church		Rochdale	Methodist		
Syke Methodist Church		Rochdale	Methodist		
The Methodist Church, Smallbridge		Rochdale	Methodist		
Norden United Reformed Church		Norden	United Reformed		
Norden Methodist Church		Norden	Methodist		
St. Vincent de Paul RC Church		Norden	Roman Catholic	1975	
St Martin's Church, Castleton		Castleton	Church of England		
United Reformed Church, Castleton		Castleton	United Reformed		
All Souls Church		Heywood			
Church of St Mary in the Baum, Rochdale		Rochdale	Church of England	1911	

== Salford ==
Church	Image	Locality	Denomination	Completed	Ref.
St John the Evangelist		Broughton	Church of England	1839	
St. James		Broughton	Church of England	1879	
St Boniface		Broughton	Roman Catholic		
Bethel Apostolic Ark		Broughton	Pentecostal		
Greek Orthodox Church of the Annunciation, Manchester		Broughton	Greek Orthodox	1861	
St Anne		Clifton	Church of England	1874	
St Mary the Virgin		Eccles	Church of England	1862	
St Andrew		Eccles	Church of England	1879	
St Mary the Virgin		Ellenbrook	Church of England	1725	
Salford Elim Church		Irlams o' th' Height	Pentecostal		
St Paul		Kersal	Church of England	1852	
Our Lady of Dolours		Kersal	Roman Catholic		
St Paul's Church, Peel		Little Hulton	Church of England	1876	
St John the Evangelist		Pendlebury	Church of England	1842	
St Augustine		Pendlebury	Church of England	1874	
Christ Church		Pendlebury	Assemblies of God (formerly CoE)	1859	
St Thomas		Pendleton	Church of England	1831	
St Luke		Pendleton	Church of England	1865	
St Clement's Church, Ordsall		Ordsall	Church of England	1878	
Salford Cathedral, St John the Evangelist		Salford	Roman Catholic	1848	
St Joseph's Convent		Worsley	Roman Catholic		
St Philip with St Stephen		Salford	Church of England	1825	
GoChurch Manchester		Salford Quays			
St Peter		Swinton	Church of England	1869	
St Paul's Church, Walkden		Walkden	Church of England	1848	
St Mark		Worsley	Church of England	1846	

== Stockport ==
Church	Image	Locality	Denomination	Completed	Ref.
Bethany Church, Gatley		Gatley	Elim Pentecostal	1975	
St Ambrose Catholic Church		Adswood	Roman Catholic	1939	
St Michael and All Angels		Bramhall	Church of England	1910	
Fords Lane Evangelical Church		Bramhall	Evangelical		
St Vincent de Paul Catholic Church		Bramhall	Roman Catholic	1968	
Bramhall Baptist Church		Bramhall	Baptist		
Bramhall Methodist Church		Bramhall	Methodist		
United Reformed Church		Bramhall	United Reformed Church		
St Barnabas		Bredbury	Church of England	1954	
Church of Our Lady and St Christopher		Bredbury	Roman Catholic	1932	
Hatherlow Church		Bredbury	United Reformed Church	1845	
St Mark's Parish Church		Bredbury	Church of England	1849	
St Bernadette's Church		Brinnington			
St Mary's Church		Cheadle	Church of England	1882	
St John's Methodist Church		Cheadle Heath	Methodist		
Grace Baptist Church, Stockport		Cheadle Heath	Baptist	1984	
All Saints' Church		Cheadle Hulme	Church of England	1863	
St Andrew's Church		Cheadle Hulme	Church of England	1920	
Offerton Methodist Church		Offerton	Methodist	1887	
Compstall Methodist Church		Compstall	Methodist	1887	
St Paul's Parish Church		Compstall	Church of England	1840	
St Matthew's Church		Edgeley	Church of England	1858	
Our Lady & The Apostles Church		Edgeley	Roman Catholic		
Hazel Grove Baptist Church		Hazel Grove	Baptist		
Hazel Grove Methodist Church		Hazel Grove	Methodist		
St Thomas' Church		Heaton Chapel	Church of England	1765	
Heaton Chapel Christian Church		Heaton Chapel			
St John the Baptist		Heaton Mersey	Church of England		
St Mary & St Mina		Heaton Moor	Coptic Orthodox Church	2000	
Heaton Moor Methodist Church		Heaton Moor	Methodist		
Heaton Moor Evangelical Church		Heaton Moor	FIEC		
St Martin's Church, Norris Bank		Heaton Norris	Church of England	1901	
All Saints Church		Marple	Church of England	1880	
Marple Independent Evangelical Church		Marple	Evangelical		
Jesus Fellowship Church		Marple Bridge	Jesus Army		
St. Thomas' Church		Mellor	Church of England		
United Reformed Church		Offerton	United Reformed Church		
Bethel Christian Centre		Reddish			
Holy Family Presbytery		Reddish			
St Elisabeth's Church		Reddish	Church of England	1883	
Romiley Methodist Church		Romiley	Methodist	1982	
St Chad's Parish Church		Romiley	Church of England	1866	
St Mary's Church		Stockport	Church of England	1817	
St Peter's Church		Stockport	Church of England	1888	
St George's Church		Stockport	Church of England	1897	
St Joseph's Church		Stockport	Roman Catholic		
Stockport Elim		Stockport	Pentecostal		
Stockport Centre Church		Offerton	Assemblies of God		
Tiviot Dale Methodist Church		Stockport	Methodist		
Woodley Methodist Church		Woodley	Methodist		
Woodley United Reformed Church	Woodley	United Reformed Church	1913		
Stockport Free Christian Fellowship		Stockport	Free Christians (Britain)		
St. Peter's Church		Hazel Grove	Roman Catholic	1931	

== Tameside ==
Church	Image	Locality	Denomination	Completed	Ref.
Albion United Reformed Church		Ashton-under-Lyne	United Reformed Church	1895	
Breakthrough City Church		Ashton-under-Lyne			
Christ Church		Ashton-under-Lyne	Church of England	1848	
Church of The Nazarene		Ashton-under-Lyne	Church of the Nazarene	1882 (as Old Cross Mission)	
Holy Trinity C of E Church		Ashton-under-Lyne	Church of England		
Hurst Methodist Church		Ashton Under Lyne	Methodist		
St Ann's RC Church		Ashton-under-Lyne	Roman Catholic		
St Christopher's RC Church		Ashton-under-Lyne	Roman Catholic		
St James the Apostle		Ashton-under-Lyne	Church of England		
St John the Evangelist Church		Ashton-under-Lyne	Church of England		
St Michael and All Angels' Church		Ashton-under-Lyne	Church of England	1262 (possibly earlier)	
St Peter's Church		Ashton-under-Lyne	Church of England		
Stamford Street Methodist Church		Ashton-under-Lyne	Methodist		
The New Life Church		Ashton-under-Lyne			
Carmel Christian Centre		Denton			
Christ Church		Denton	Church of England		
Denton Methodist Church		Denton	Methodist		
St Anne's Church		Denton	Church of England	1882	
St John Fisher RC Church		Denton	Roman Catholic		
St Mary's RC Church		Denton	Roman Catholic		
St Lawrence's Church		Denton	Church of England	1532	
Moravian Church		Droylsden	Moravian Church		
St Martin's Church		Droylsden			
Droylsden Independent Church		Droylsden	Congregational Church		
Moravian Church		Dukinfield	Moravian Church		
Old Chapel		Dukinfield	Unitarian		
St Mary's RC Church		Dukinfield	Roman Catholic		
St George		Hyde	Church of England	1832	
St Paul		Hyde	Roman Catholic	1854	
St Michael and All Angels		Mottram in Longdendale	Church of England	1855	

== Trafford ==
Church	Image	Locality	Denomination	Completed	Ref.
Altrincham Methodist Church		Altrincham	Methodist		
Altrincham Unitarian Church		Altrincham	Unitarian		
Bowdon Downs Church		Altrincham			
Christ Church		Timperley	Church of England	1849	
Church of St Alban		Altrincham	Church of England	1900	
Church of St George		Altrincham	Church of England	1897	
Church of St John the Evangelist		Altrincham			
Church of St Margaret		Altrincham			
Church of St John the Divine		Altrincham			
Hale Chapel		Altrincham			
St Vincent's RC Church		Altrincham	Roman Catholic		
Trinity United Reformed Church		Altrincham	United Reformed Church		
Church of St Mary the Virgin		Bowdon	Church of England	1860	
St George's Church		Carrington	Church of England	1872	
St Michael's Church		Flixton	Church of England	1100s	
Kingdom Hall		Old Trafford	Jehovah's Witnesses		
New Testament Church of God		Old Trafford	Pentecostal		
Sharon Full Gospel Church		Old Trafford	Pentecostal		
St Alphonsus		Old Trafford	Roman Catholic		
St Bride's		Old Trafford	Church of England	1991; 2016 (third building)	
St John's (St John the Evangelist)		Old Trafford	Church of England	c. 1902; 1908 (permanent building)	
The Bethel		Old Trafford	Christadelphian		
United Reformed Church		Old Trafford	United Reformed Church		
All Saints Roman Catholic Church		Sale	Roman Catholic	1966	
Avenue Methodist Church		Sale	Methodist	1963	
Carrington Lane Methodist Church		Sale	Methodist	1911	
LifeChurch Manchester		Sale	Baptist	1964	
Sale Christadelphians		Sale	Christadelphian	1956	
Sale Congregational Church		Sale	Congregational	1980	
Sale Moor Methodist Church		Sale	Methodist	1963	
Sale Society of Friends		Sale	Religious Society of Friends	1856	
Sale United Reformed Church		Sale	United Reformed Church	1984	
Salvation Army		Sale	Salvation Army	1991	
St Anne's Church		Sale	Church of England	1854	
St Francis' Church		Sale	Church of England	1962	
St John the Divine Church		Sale	Church of England	1868	
St Joseph Roman Catholic Church		Sale	Roman Catholic	†1885	
St Margaret Ward Roman Catholic Church		Sale	Roman Catholic	1983	
St Martin's Church, Ashton upon Mersey		Sale	Church of England	1887	
St Mary Magdalene Church		Sale	Church of England	1874	
St Paul's Church		Sale	Church of England	1883	
Timperley Methodist Church		Timperley	Methodist	1937	
Trinity Methodist Church		Sale	Methodist	1875	
All Saints		Stretford	Church of England	1957	
Church of St Ann		Stretford	Roman Catholic	1867	
Church of St Matthew		Stretford	Church of England	1842	
Edge Lane Baptist Church		Stretford	Baptist		
Gorse Hill United Church		Stretford	Church of England, Methodist		
Latter-Day Saints Chapel		Stretford	The Church of Jesus Christ of Latter-Day Saints		
Salvation Army Church		Stretford	Salvation Army		
Sevenways Methodist Church		Stretford	Methodist		
St Alphonsus		Stretford	Roman Catholic		
St Hilda		Stretford	Church of England	1904	
St Hugh of Lincoln		Stretford	Roman Catholic	1964	
St John the Evangelist		Stretford	Church of England	1908	
St Lawrence		Stretford	Roman Catholic	1866	
St Teresa		Stretford	Roman Catholic	1928	
Stretford Gospel Hall		Stretford	Christian Brethren		
Trafford Christian Life Centre		Stretford	Pentecostal	1879	
St Antony of Padua		Trafford Park	Roman Catholic	1995	
St Werburgh		Warburton	Church of England	1885	
St Monica's		Urmston	Roman Catholic		
All Saints		Urmston	Roman Catholic		
Victoria Gospel Hall		Urmston	Christian Brethren		
St. Mary's		Urmston	Church of England		
Flixton Fellowship Church		Flixton	Independent		

== Wigan ==
Church	Image	Locality	Denomination	Completed	Ref.
St John the Evangelist's Church, Abram		Abram	Church of England	1937	
St Thomas' Church, Ashton-in-Makerfield		Ashton-in-Makerfield	Church of England	1930	
St Stephen's Church, Astley		Astley	Church of England	1631	
St John the Baptist's Church, Atherton		Atherton	Church of England	1879	
St Michael and All Angels' Church, Howe Bridge		Howe Bridge, Atherton	Church of England	1877	
St Anne's Church, Hindsford		Hindsford, Atherton	Church of England	1901 (now redundant)	
Chowbent Unitarian Chapel, Atherton		Atherton	Unitarianism	1721	
Sacred Heart Roman Catholic Church, Hindsford		Hindsford, Atherton	Roman Catholic	1869 (now redundant)	
St David's Church, Haigh		Haigh	Church of England	1830	
St Peter's Church, Hindley		Hindley	Church of England	1866	
Christ Church, Ince-in-Makerfield		Ince-in-Makerfield	Church of England	1864	
St Mary's Church, Lower Ince		Ince-in-Makerfield	Church of England		
Bethany Evangelical Church, Pennington		Leigh	FIEC	n/a	
St Mary the Virgin's Church, Leigh		Leigh	Church of England	1873	
St Thomas' Church, Bedford		Bedford, Leigh	Church of England	1840	
Christ Church, Pennington		Pennington, Leigh	Church of England	1854	
St Joseph's Roman Catholic Church, Leigh		Bedford, Leigh	Roman Catholic	1778	
St Peter's Church, Leigh		Westleigh, Leigh	Church of England	1881	
St Mary's Church, Lowton		Lowton	Church of England	1861	
St John's Church, Mosley Common		Mosley Common	Church of England	1883	
St Luke's Church, Orrell		Orrell	Church of England	1926	
St John the Divine's Church, Pemberton		Pemberton	Church of England	1832	
Holy Family Church, Platt Bridge		Platt Bridge	Roman Catholic		
St Catharine's Church, Scholes		Scholes	Church of England	1841	
Church of St Wilfrid, Standish		Standish	Church of England	1584	
St George's Church, Tyldesley		Tyldesley	Church of England	1825	
Tyldesley Top Chapel		Tyldesley	Pentecostal	1789	
St Stephen's Church, Whelley		Whelley	Church of England	1928–39, extended 1937–38	
Church of All Saints, Wigan		Wigan	Church of England	13th century, rebuilt 1845–50	
St George's Church, Wigan		Wigan	Church of England	1781	
Church of St James with St Thomas, Poolstock		Wigan	Church of England	1866	
Parish Church of St Matthew, Highfield, Wigan		Wigan	Church of England	1894	
St Michael and all Angels, Swinley, Wigan		Wigan	Church of England	1878	
St John's Roman Catholic Church, Wigan		Wigan	Roman Catholic	1819	
St Mary's Roman Catholic Church, Wigan		Wigan	Roman Catholic	1818	

== See also ==
- Salford (hundred)
- Manchester (ancient parish)
- List of places in Greater Manchester
- Anglican Diocese of Manchester
- List of Roman Catholic churches in the Diocese of Salford
- Anglican Diocese of Chester
- Roman Catholic Diocese of Salford
- Roman Catholic Diocese of Shrewsbury
- Roman Catholic Archdiocese of Liverpool
- Grade I listed buildings in Greater Manchester
- Grade II* listed buildings in Greater Manchester
