= George Henry Bolsover =

English academic (1910–1990)

George Henry Bolsover CBE (18 November 1910 – 15 April 1990) was the director of the School of Slavonic and East European Studies at the University of London from 1947 to 1976. The school, now known as UCL School of Slavonic and East European Studies, is part of University College, London.

== Life ==
Bolsover was born at 12 Powys Street, Hindsford, Atherton, Lancashire, England, the son of a cotton worker and his wife. On 25 March 1939, at St Anne's Church, in Hindsford he married Stephanie Kállail who was four years his junior. They had a daughter, Anne, born 1953.

He was appointed OBE in 1947 and CBE in 1970.

He was an Anglican and died of a heart attack in his local church at Hatch End, London, on Easter Sunday 1990.

== Education ==
He was educated at Leigh Grammar School in Leigh, where he learned Russian. He graduated BA in Russian in 1931 and MA in 1932 from the University of Liverpool which had the first Russian chair in the country. He wrote his PhD thesis at the School of Slavonic Studies on Great Britain, Russia and the Eastern question, 1832–1841 in 1933.

== Career ==
After gaining his PhD, from 1937 to 1938 he was a tutor in adult education at the Worcester base of Birmingham University. From 1938 to 1943 he lectured on European history at University of Manchester.

From 1943 to 1947 he was attaché and first secretary at the British Embassy in Moscow. After returning to Britain he was appointed director of the School of Slavonic and East European Studies (SSEES), London, from which he retired in 1976. He presided over a period of growth in interest in Russian and East European studies and the School's post war expansion.

At the time he joined SSEES, the department was regarded as a bed of pro-Soviet sentiment influenced by Andrew Rothstein, a founding member of the British Communist Party. Rothstein had spent several years in Moscow and returned to England in 1931 suspected of being involved with agent development. In 1949 Bolsover terminated his contract on the basis that he was not qualified for a post.

His biography describes him as a shadowy figure to his students and regarded by his staff as intrusively unsupportive and heavy-handed. He is referred to as a tough and manipulative personality and "a useful bastard", but when entertaining at home, a genial and hospitable host.
