= Listed buildings in Atherton, Greater Manchester =

Atherton is a town in the Metropolitan Borough of Wigan, Greater Manchester, England. The town and its suburbs of Howe Bridge and Hindsford contain 18 listed buildings that are recorded in the National Heritage List for England. Of these, four are listed at Grade II*, the middle of the three grades, and the others are at Grade II, the lowest grade.

The area became a centre for making nails, and later bolts, and then for the cotton and coal industries. The older listed buildings are houses, farmhouses, farm buildings, a chapel and associated structures, and an obelisk. The listed buildings surviving from the industrial past are a bolt mill, a cotton mill, a pithead bathhouse, and terraces of miners' houses, and the other listed buildings are churches.

== Key ==
Grade	Criteria
II*	Particularly important buildings of more than special interest
II	Buildings of national importance and special interest

== Buildings ==
Name and location	Photograph	Date	Notes	Grade
Chanters Farmhouse; 53.52197°N 2.48245°W		1678	A stone house with quoins and a stone-slate roof. It has a two-bays main range with two storeys, and a gabled cross-wing at the left with three storeys. In the right bay is a porch with a coped gable, and inner and outer doorways with moulded jambs. The windows are mullioned, and two gables contain an oculus. Inside there is an inglenook and a bressumer.	II*
Alder House; 53.52416°N 2.48401°W		1697	A stone house with a stone-slate roof, it has three storeys, a double-depth plan, sides of three bays, and three gables on three fronts. The central doorway has a canopy with an ogee-shaped gable on decorative brackets, and it is flanked by large buttresses added in 1881. The windows are mullioned, and in the gables they are stepped with stepped hood moulds.	II*
Chowbent Chapel; 53.52463°N 2.48560°W		1721	The chapel, which was extended in 1901, was originally Presbyterian, and later Unitarian. It is in brick on a stone plinth, with stone dressings, quoins, bands, an eaves cornice on shaped brackets, and a slate roof. There is a two-storey entrance wing that has a round-headed doorway with a keystone and fanlight, above which is a sundial, a plaque, and a gable pediment with an oculus in the tympanum. Along the sides are two tiers of round-headed windows, and on the roof is an open cupola with a lead roof and a weathervane.	II*
Gates, piers and railings, Chowbent Chapel; 53.52482°N 2.48588°W		c. 1721	The gate piers are in stone, they are boldly rusticated, with moulded bases and caps, and are surmounted by decorative urns. The railings and the other piers date from the 19th century. There are cast iron gates and railings that sweep round to meet rusticated piers with moulded caps and Gothic panels. More railings stretch along the north side of the churchyard to link with end piers.	II
49 and 49A Bolton Old Road; 53.52486°N 2.48518°W		c. 1721	Originally a minister's house, later partly used as a school, it is in brick on a stone plinth, with stone dressings, quoins, stone eaves gutter brackets, and a slate roof. There are two storeys, three bays, and a lean-to rear extension. The central doorway has a fanlight, and a stone lintel with rusticated voussoirs. On the ground floor are two 19th-century bay windows, and on the upper floor are three windows with stone sills and keystone wedge lintels; two are casements and one is a sash window. In the rear extension is an arched stair window.	II
Barn, Old Hall Farm; 53.50847°N 2.50615°W	—	Early 18th century	The barn is in brick with a Welsh slate roof and four bays. It contains doors, hatches, vents, and a wagon entrance.	II
Rosehill; 53.52603°N 2.48312°W		Early 18th century	A house, later divided into two dwellings, in brick, partly rendered at the rear, on a stone plinth, with stone dressings, quoins, a moulded eaves cornice, and a cement tile roof. There are three storeys and three bays. The original doorway has an elliptical head and a fanlight, and to the right is an inserted round-headed doorway. The windows are 20th-century casements with stone sills and flat arches, and those on the upper floor have keystones.	II
Collier Brook Farmhouse; 53.52712°N 2.49791°W		Early to mid-18th century	A farmhouse, later a private house, in rendered stone on a plinth, with bands, a stone slab roof, and possibly incorporating earlier timber framing. There are two storeys, three bays, a central canted bay window, a gabled porch, a round-headed doorway with a fanlight, and casement windows.	II
Obelisk; 53.52361°N 2.48998°W		1781	The obelisk stands outside St John the Baptist's Church, and was restored in 1867, most of the shaft dating from the restoration. It is in stone and is on a rusticated pedestal and a stylobate. On the shaft are sunken panels.	II
Collier Brook Bolt Works; 53.52691°N 2.49682°W		1856	A factory for making nails and bolts, it is in brick with roof of Welsh and local slate. The factory consists of various ranges, making an overall T-shaped plan, including a forge, a storage block, a large screw-boring workshop, and a finishing and polishing shed. The forge contains six individual forges, each with a tall tapering brick chimney that rises through the roof.	II
Sacred Heart Church, Hindsford; 53.51693°N 2.47855°W		1869	A Roman Catholic church designed by Edmund Kirby in Early English style, it is in buff sandstone with dressings and banding in red sandstone, and a slate roof with coped gables and cross finials. The church consists of a west porch, narthex and baptistry, a nave, a sanctuary with a canted end, a Lady chapel, a south confessional, and a northwest steeple. The steeple has a square tower, an octagonal bell stage, and a spire with lucarnes. At the west end is a large rose window.	II
147–191 Leigh Road; 53.51893°N 2.50533°W		1873	A terrace of miners' cottages incorporating a bath house in the centre. They are in brick with Welsh slate roofs, and the cottages have two storeys. The bath house has three storeys, a hipped roof, three round-headed arches on the ground floor, two windows on the middle floor with pointed heads, and three openings on the top floor, also with pointed heads. The cottages have casement windows with cambered brick heads and the doorways also have cambered heads.	II
94–118 Leigh Road; 53.51874°N 2.50498°W		1875	A terrace of miners' cottages incorporating an institute at the north end and a now vacant shop. They are in brick on a plinth, with bands and Welsh slate roofs, and have two storeys. The institute is gabled and has five bays. At one time there were three shops, also gabled, with shop fronts. The cottages have casement windows with cambered brick heads and the doorways also have cambered heads.	II
St Michael and All Angels' Church, Howe Bridge; 53.51763°N 2.50687°W		1875–77	The church, designed by Paley and Austin, is in yellow stone with dressings in Runcorn sandstone, and has tiled roofs with coped gables. It consists of a nave, a north porch, north and south chapels, north and south transepts, a chancel with aisles, meeting rooms, and a vestry. On the roof is a two-stage octagonal flèche, and on the north side of the chancel is a gabled stair turret.	II*
St John the Baptist's Church; 53.52393°N 2.49010°W		1878–79	The church was designed by Paley and Austin in late Decorated style, it was extended in 1892, and was repaired following a fire in 1991. The church is in stone and has a clay tile roof with coped gables. It consists of a nave with a clerestory, north and south aisles, a chancel with a chapel and a vestry, and a southwest tower. The tower has five stages, octagonal clasping buttresses that rise to pinnacles with conical roofs, a south door, a four-light south window, a canopied niche containing a statue above the bell openings, and an embattled parapet. At the corner of the vestry is an octagonal turret.	II
St Anne's Church, Hindsford; 53.51893°N 2.48125°W		1889–91	The church was designed by Austin and Paley in Gothic Revival style, and has since been converted into flats. It is in sandstone and has a roof of Westmorland slate with coped gables and an apex cross. The church consists of a nave, north and south aisles, a south porch, a south transept, a chancel, a south vestry, and a south tower. The tower has diagonal buttresses, an octagonal stair turret rising to a greater height, an embattled parapet, and a pyramidal roof with a weathervane.	II
Ena Mill; 53.52737°N 2.49538°W		1908	Originally a cotton spinning mill, later used for other purposes, it has an internal metal frame, and is in red brick with dressings in stone and buff terracotta. The main block has five storeys and sides of twelve and nine bays, there is a two-storey carding house, an engine house, a boiler house, a tall circular chimney with a moulded and panelled cap, and a stair and sprinkler tower. The tower rises two storeys above the main block, it has a segmental pediment on each side, and corner turrets.	II
Former Pithead Bathhouse, Gibfield Colliery; 53.52546°N 2.50550°W	—	1913	The first pithead bathhouse in England, and later used for other purposes, it is in red brick, partly rendered, with sandstone sills, and roofs of cement sheet and felt. It consists of a central hall, five bays long and three bays wide, with a clerestory, flanked by lower aisles. There is a central entrance, and the other openings are blocked and have segmental soldier brick arches. There are pilasters between the bays, and on each gable end is an oculus.	II
