= Alder House =

Alder House may refer to:

- Alder House, the football ground of Atherton Collieries A.F.C.
- Alder House, Atherton, a listed building in Greater Manchester, England
