= Alder House, Atherton =

Listed building in Greater Manchester, England

Alder House
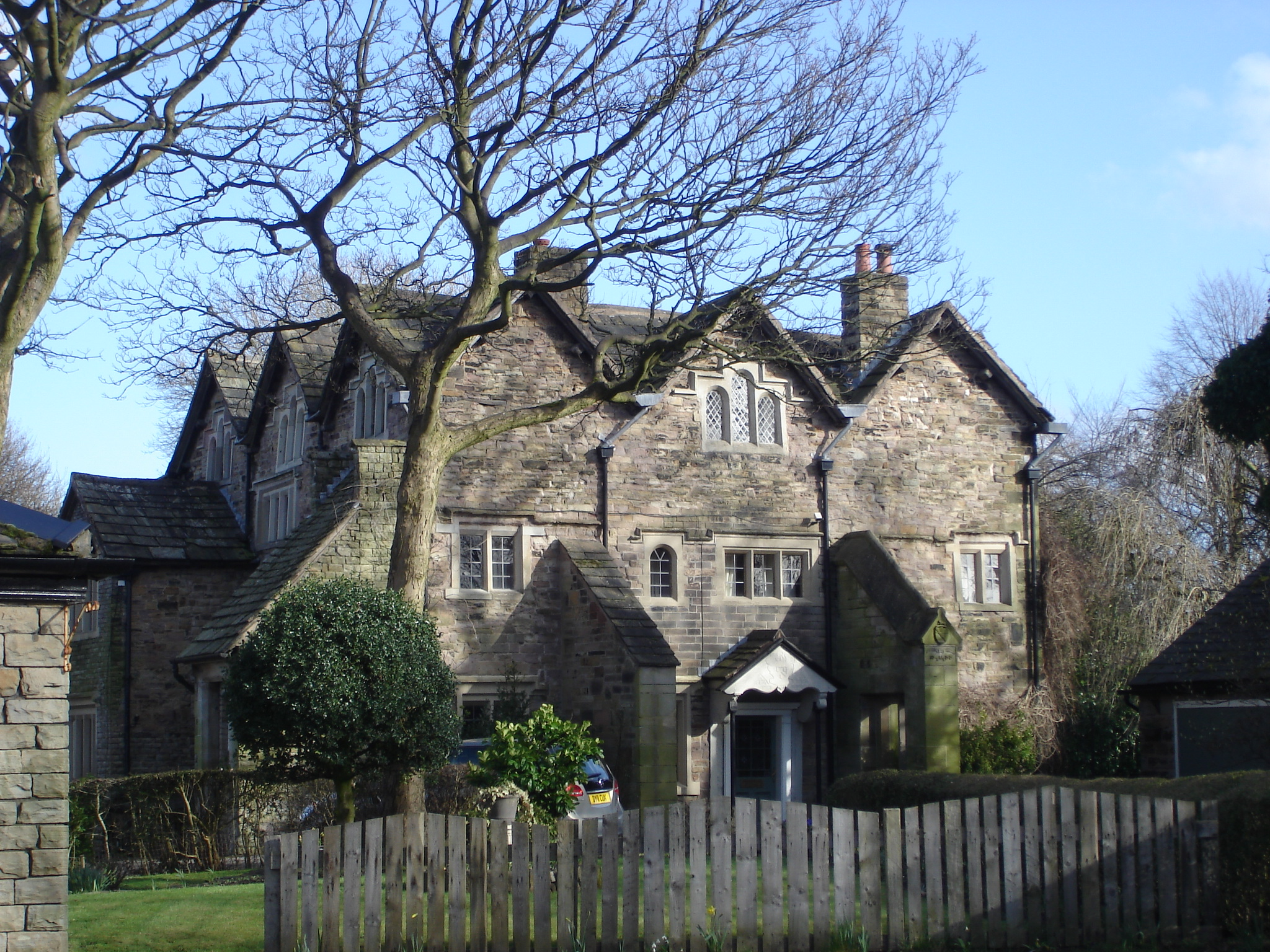
- Alder House in 2014

- Location within Greater Manchester

General information
- Location: Alder Street, Atherton, Greater Manchester, England
- Coordinates: 53.52414°N 2.48398°W
- Year built: 1697; 329 years ago
- Renovated: 19th century (additions)

Listed Building – Grade II*
- Official name: Alder House
- Designated: 15 July 1966
- Reference no.: 1068470

Alder House is a Grade II* listed building on Alder Street in Atherton, a town within the Metropolitan Borough of Wigan, Greater Manchester, England. Historically in Lancashire and built in 1697 for Ralph and Ann Astley, it later passed to families prominent in local nonconformist history and was altered in the 19th century under industrialist Thomas Lee. Listed in 1966 for its architectural and historic interest, it has had varied civic uses and is now a private residence.

== History ==
Alder House was constructed in 1697 by Ralph Astley and his wife Ann, as indicated by the inscription "RAA RA 1697" on its porch. At the time of its construction, Atherton was primarily a village of nailmakers, and Ralph was an iron merchant who supplied raw materials to local craftsmen and traded finished goods, reportedly conducting significant business with Ireland. Local tradition holds that Ralph and Ann died within a day of each other in 1727, allegedly struck by lightning, and were buried at nearby Chowbent Chapel.

Following their deaths, the house passed to the Mort family, prominent supporters of the dissenting congregation at Chowbent Chapel. Nathan Mort donated land for the chapel in 1722, strengthening the link between Alder House and local nonconformist history. Ownership later transferred to the Withington family of Culcheth Hall, who continued this association. In the 19th century, the property was purchased by Thomas Lee, a wealthy cotton mill owner, who added large buttresses to the front of the house in 1888 and played a significant role in local civic life, including laying foundation stones for churches in Atherton and Hindsford.

In the 20th century, Alder House underwent several changes of use. The property were acquired by Fletcher, Burrows and Company in 1916 for mining rights and the house was converted into a day nursery in 1918. By 1922 the company donated the building to Atherton Council, and it later served as a maternity clinic.

On 15 July 1966, Alder House was designated a Grade II* listed building for its architectural and historic significance. After standing empty for a period, the house was sold for a token sum of £1 to a private owner, refurbished, and eventually became a family home in 1999.

== Architecture ==
The building is constructed of hammer-dressed stone with a stone-slate roof and follows a double-depth plan. It has three storeys arranged in a 3 by 3 bay configuration, with 19th-century additions to the left and rear. Three elevations include triple gables, and the central doorway has a pitched canopy with an ogee-shaped gable supported by decorative brackets. The front entrance is flanked by buttresses added in the late 19th century, bearing the date 1888 and a coat of arms.

The windows are mullioned, typically with two to six lights and hood moulds, and the gables contain stepped three-light windows with arched lights in the Yorkshire tradition. A decorative lead rainwater trough with a grapevine pattern runs around two sides of the building. Internally, the layout is two rooms deep and two rooms wide, and includes a dog-leg staircase with a closed string, pulvinated frieze, turned balusters, and capped newel posts. Other interior details include moulded fire surrounds, some with carved oak overmantels, ovolo-moulded floor beams, and numerous 17th-century panelled doors set within eared architraves decorated with carved rosettes.

== Association with Atherton Collieries A.F.C. ==
Alder House gives its name to the football ground of Atherton Collieries A.F.C., which is also on Alder Street. The ground is situated close to the historic building, and the club has played there since its formation in 1916.

== See also ==
- Grade II* listed buildings in Greater Manchester
- Listed buildings in Atherton, Greater Manchester
