= Keith Stott =

English footballer

Personal information
- Date of birth: 12 March 1944
- Place of birth: Atherton, England
- Date of death: 5 March 2012 (aged 67)
- Position: Central defender

Youth career
- Manchester City

Senior career*
Years	Team	Apps	(Gls)
1964–1970	Crewe Alexandra	188	(11)
1970–1975	Chesterfield	142	(4)
1975–1976	Matlock Town		
Total		330	(15)
- * Club domestic league appearances and goals

Keith Stott (12 March 1944 – 5 March 2012) was an English professional footballer who played in the Football League as a defender.
