= Thomas Walker Horsfield =

British clergyman, topographer and historian

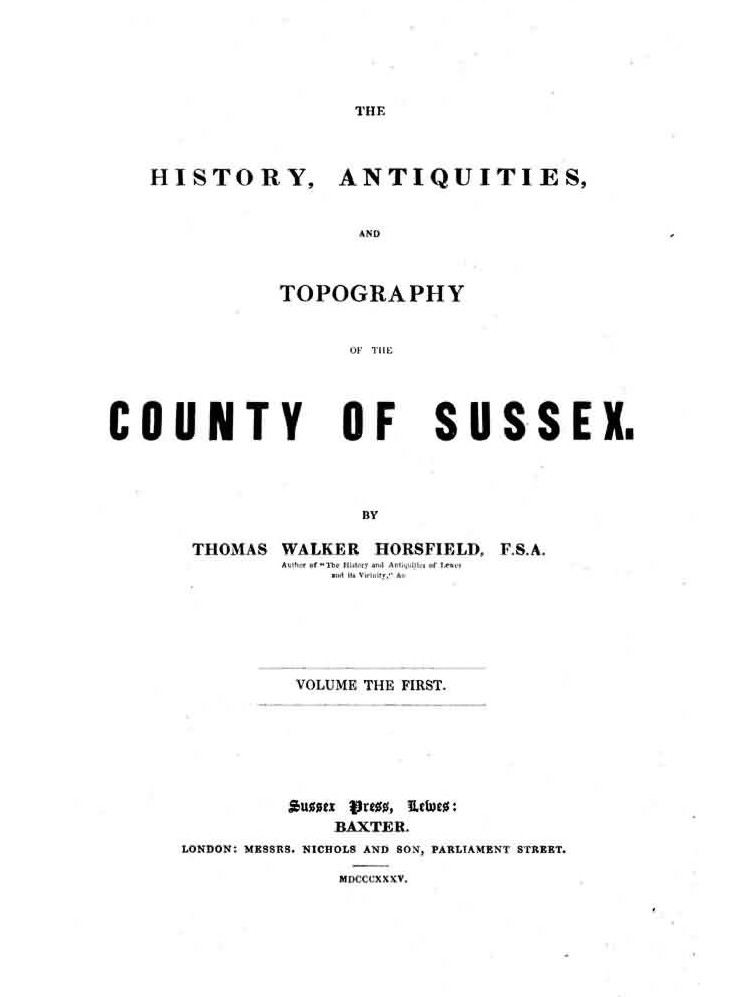

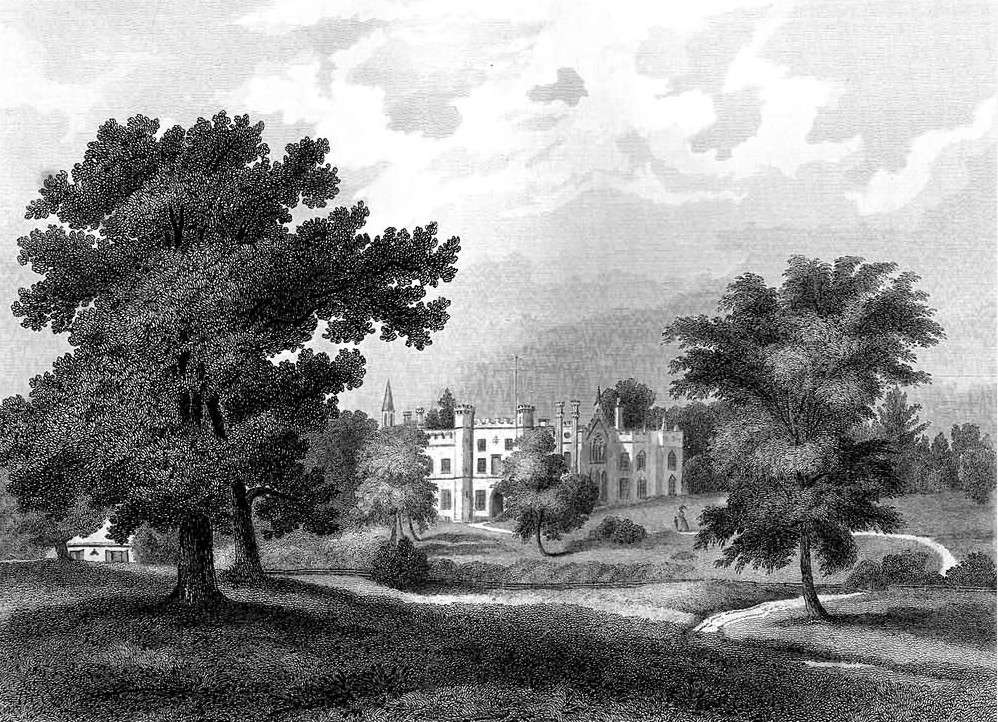
Sheffield Place The History, Antiquities and Topography of the County of Sussex

Rev. Thomas Walker Horsfield FSA (christened 2 December 1792, Sheffield - 26 August 1837, Chowbent, Lancashire), was an English Nonconformist minister, topographer, and historian best known for his works The History and Antiquities of Lewes (1824-26) and The History, Antiquities and Topography of the County of Sussex (1835).

== Life ==
He was the eldest of six children of James Horsfield and Ann Hewett who were married 29 July 1790 in St Peter's Cathedral, Sheffield, Yorkshire.

Horsfield was minister at the Westgate Chapel in Lewes, later changed from Presbyterian to Unitarian. He found time from his ministerial duties to take on pupils.

In 1835, Horsfield was appointed to succeed Benjamin Rigby Davis as Presbyterian minister at the Chowbent Chapel, Atherton, Lancashire.

He died there on 26 August 1837, leaving a widow and eight children.

== Works ==
His History of Sussex in two volumes became a standard reference work for later Sussex historians.

Horsfield compiled for John Baxter The History and Antiquities of Lewes and its vicinity (with an appendix, an Essay on the Natural History of the District by Gideon Mantell), two vols. Lewes, 1824–7. This was followed by a more major undertaking, The History and Antiquities and Topography of the County of Sussex, two vols. Lewes, 1835. For the first volume, which contains East Sussex, Horsfield was assisted by William Durrant Cooper; the second volume, on West Sussex, is mainly an abridgment of the histories of James Dallaway and Edmund Cartwright (1773–1833).
