= Chanters Farmhouse =

Listed building in Atherton, Greater Manchester, England

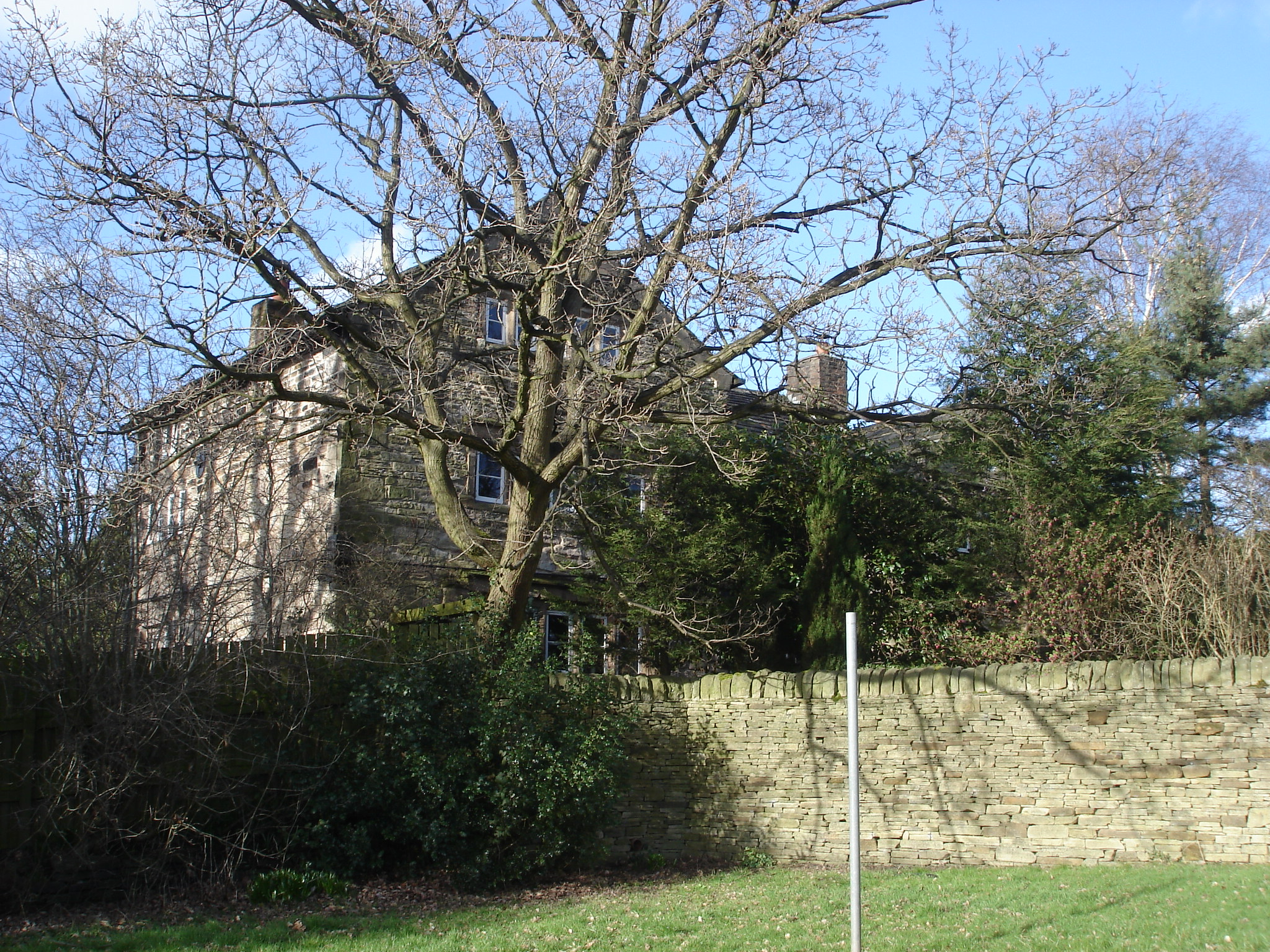
- Chanters Farmhouse in 2014

- Location within Greater Manchester

General information
- Architectural style: Vernacular
- Location: Chanters Avenue, Atherton, Greater Manchester, England
- Coordinates: 53.52197°N 2.48243°W
- Year built: 1678; 348 years ago

Listed Building – Grade II*
- Official name: Chanters Farmhouse
- Designated: 15 July 1966
- Reference no.: 1309438

Chanters Farmhouse is a Grade II* listed 17th-century domestic building on Chanters Avenue in Atherton, a town within the Metropolitan Borough of Wigan, Greater Manchester, England. Historically in Lancashire, its listing highlights its vernacular architectural character.

== History ==
The name "Chanters" derives from a chantry granted by the Bishop of Lichfield in 1360 to Sir William de Atherton. Chanters Farmhouse dates from 1678, as indicated by the inscription "WA 1678" on the door lintel, which is thought to refer to William Atherton, a member of the Atherton family, long-established landowners in the area. The family's presence in the region extends back to medieval times, and the farmhouse is characteristic of domestic buildings of the late 17th century.

On 15 July 1966, Chanters Farmhouse was designated a Grade II* listed building for its architectural and historic significance.

Since its listing, the property has undergone little visible alteration and retains many of its original architectural features. It was photographed in 2001 as part of the Images of England project, which aimed to create a visual record of listed buildings across the country.

== Architecture ==
The building is constructed of hammer-dressed stone with a graduated stone-slate roof. The building follows a T-shaped baffle-entry (lobby without doors) plan, comprising two storeys with a three-storey gabled cross-wing and a two-storey porch. The farmhouse has five-light, double-chamfered, ovolo-moulded stone mullion windows, each with hood moulds on the floors of the cross-wing. The porch has a coped gable with kneelers and contains both inner and outer doorways with heavy ovolo-moulded timber jambs. It retains its original studded door, dating from the 17th century. Additional features include an oculus set within the porch gable, and several inscribed quoin stones, among them one marked "17 PCM 23". The inscription has been noted in connection with later phases of the building's development.

Inside, the farmhouse includes a large inglenook fireplace with an ovolo-moulded bressummer beam. The interior also contains moulded floor beams, shortened when a staircase was inserted, alongside built-in panelled oak cupboards and several original doors.

== See also ==
- Grade II* listed buildings in Greater Manchester
- Listed buildings in Atherton, Greater Manchester
