= Sacred Heart Roman Catholic Church, Hindsford =

Church in Hindsford, Greater Manchester, England

Coordinates: 53.516°N 2.478°W

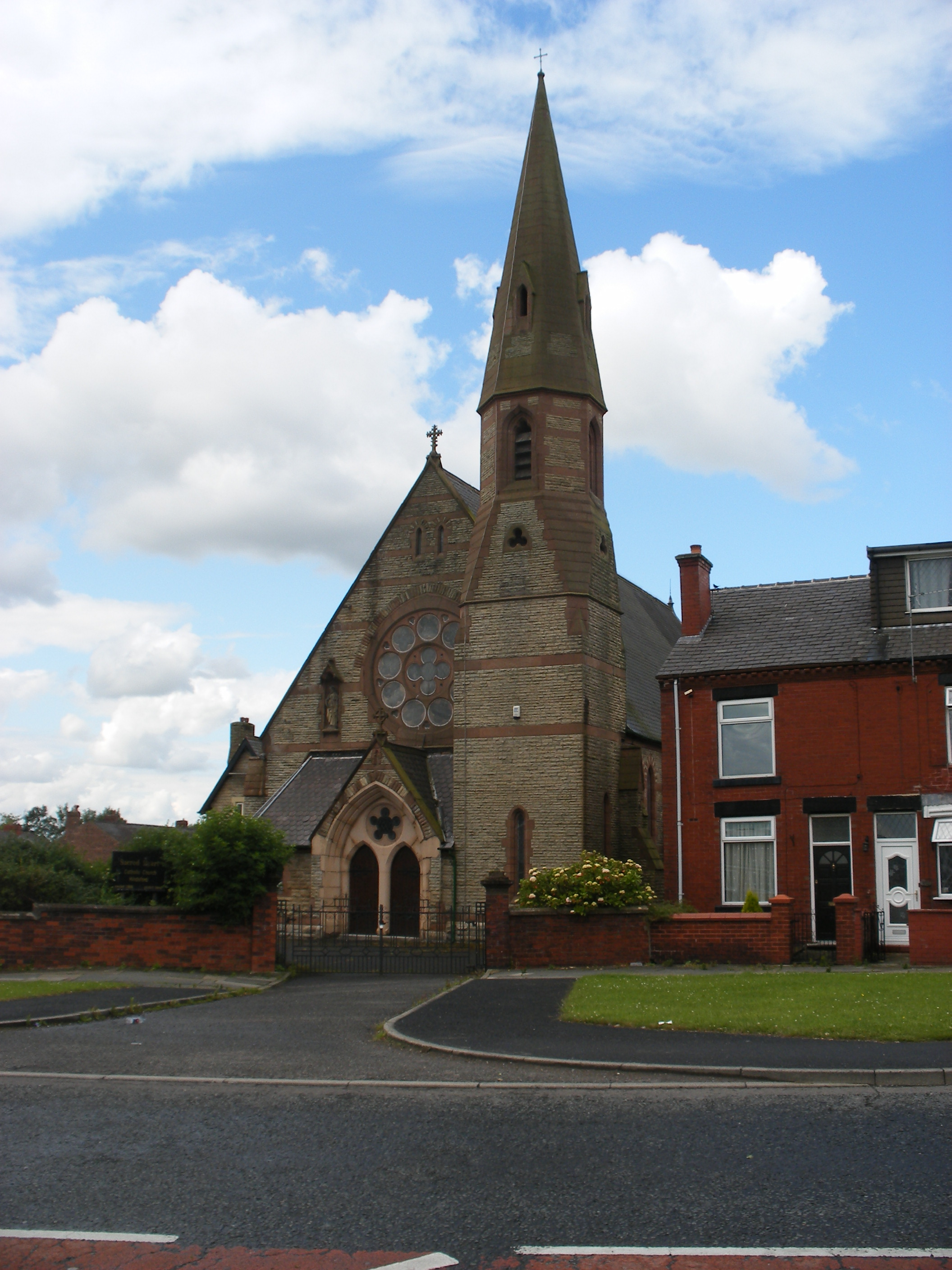
- Sacred Heart Church

Religion
- Affiliation: Roman Catholic
- Ecclesiastical or organizational status: redundant
- Year consecrated: 1869

Location
- Location: Hindsford, Atherton, Greater Manchester, England
- Interactive map of Sacred Heart Roman Catholic Church, Hindsford

Architecture
- Architect: Edmund Kirby
- Type: Church
- Style: Gothic Revival
- Materials: sandstone

Sacred Heart Church is a Grade II listed redundant Roman Catholic church on Tyldesley Road, Hindsford, Atherton in Greater Manchester, England. It has been designated by English Heritage as a Grade II listed building.

== History ==
The Roman Catholic parish was established in the 19th century to serve Irish immigrant families who moved to the area to work in the cotton mills and coal mines. The church was built on a site donated by Lord Lilford. John Holland of the Tyldesley Coal Company provided materials to build the church which was consecrated by the Bishop of Liverpool, Alexander Goss in 1869. A separate presbytery, built around the same time, was linked to the church in matching materials by 1894. Sacred Heart School opened in 1888. It was demolished by 2000. The church closed for worship in 2004.

Sacred Heart's parish together with St Richard's in Atherton which opened in 1928, Holy Family in Boothstown, St Ambrose Barlow in Astley, St Gabriel's, Higher Folds in Leigh are united as a single community with St Margaret Clitherow as its patron.

== Architecture ==
The church was built to the design of architect Edmund Kirby of Birkenhead and was extended soon after completion and altered in the 20th century. It is built in the Early English style in squared rubble sandstone with red ashlar sandstone dressings, decorative banding, coped gables with cross finials and its roof is laid in bands of blue and grey fish-scale slates. Nikolaus Pevsner describes it as a "pretty church".

=== Exterior ===
The east elevation has a tall wide gable with a large round window of circular lights around a central quatrefoil. At the north-east corner is a multi-stage square tower with stepped chamfered corners supporting an octagonal spire with lucarnes. In the centre of the elevation is a gabled porch with a cinquefoil window above a pointed arch with twin pointed arch doorways. To its left is the baptistery. The south elevation has five bays with paired lancet windows separated by gabled buttresses and a single-storey extension for the confessional in its centre bay. The sanctuary is canted with tall three-light windows with cinquefoil heads separated by buttresses.

=== Interior ===
The nave, aisles and chancel are under a single arched roof with exposed rafters supported by arch-braced king post roof trusses and the collar beams are supported on corbels. The main entrance is in the narthex at the east end which also provides access to the gallery which houses the organ. The altar survives and there is a carved wooden pulpit. The central aisle has contemporary pews on either side. The sanctuary windows from 1881 are by Mayer.

== See also ==
- Listed buildings in Atherton, Greater Manchester
- List of churches in Greater Manchester
