= St Michael and All Angels' Church, Howe Bridge =

Coordinates: 53.5176°N 2.5069°W

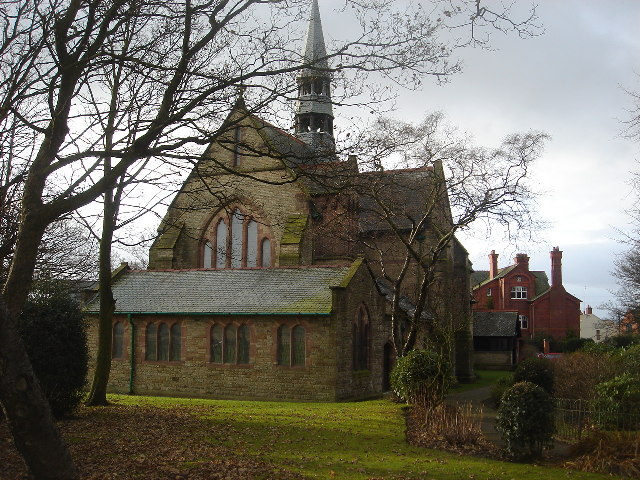
- St Michael and All Angels' Church, Howe Bridge, from the east

- Location in Greater Manchester
- OS grid reference: SD 665,025
- Location: Leigh Road, Howe Bridge, Atherton, Greater Manchester
- Country: England
- Denomination: Anglican
- Website: Parish Website

History
- Status: Parish church
- Consecrated: 7 February 1877

Architecture
- Functional status: Active
- Heritage designation: Grade II*
- Designated: 31 July 1996
- Architect(s): Paley and Austin, Austin and Paley
- Architectural type: Church
- Style: Gothic Revival
- Groundbreaking: 1875
- Completed: 1877

Specifications
- Materials: Sandstone with tiled roofs

Administration
- Province: York
- Diocese: Manchester
- Archdeaconry: Salford
- Deanery: Leigh
- Parish: St Michael and All Angels, Howe Bridge

St Michael and All Angels' Church is in Leigh Road, Howe Bridge, a suburb of Atherton, Greater Manchester, England. It is an active Anglican parish church in the deanery of Leigh, the archdeaconry of Salford and the diocese of Manchester. Its benefice is united with those of three local churches, St John the Baptist, St George and St Philip, forming a team ministry entitled the United Benefice of Atherton and Hindsford with Howe Bridge. The church is recorded in the National Heritage List for England as a designated Grade II* listed building.

== History ==
The church was built between 1875 and 1877 to a design by the Lancaster architects Paley and Austin for Fletcher, Burrows and Company, the owners of three collieries in Atherton. It cost £7,000 (equivalent to £710,000 in 2025), and was paid for by Ralph Fletcher. The church was consecrated on 7 February 1877, and became a separate parish in its own right in August 1878. In 1928 the church was reseated at a cost of £1,056 by Austin and Paley, the successors in the Lancaster practice, and in 1938 they added a vestry at the east end at a cost of £1,338. The United Benefice was created in 2002.

== Architecture ==
=== Exterior ===
St Michael's is constructed in coursed stone with dressings of Runcorn red sandstone ashlar, and has tiled roofs. Its plan is cruciform, consisting of an aisleless nave with a north porch and side chapels, north and south transepts, and a chancel with a clerestory and aisles, and an attached meeting room and choir vestry. Above the crossing is a two-stage octagonal flèche surmounted by a tall spire. At the west end is a large central buttress flanked by two-light windows with pointed arches. Above these in the gable are three small lancet windows. On the north side of the church is a timber-framed porch with a gable and side windows. To the east of this is a single two-light window and two three-light windows. There are similar windows on the south side of the nave. The chapels have two-light windows on the west and three-light windows on their sides. The transept gables contain a three-light window flanked by buttresses, and two lancets above them. In the clerestory there are three small lancet windows on each side. The large east window consists of five stepped lancets. There are further lancet windows in the rooms adjoining the chancel. Against the north wall of the chancel is a gabled stair turret decorated with blind arcading.

=== Interior ===
The nave has an open roof, and the chancel is stone-vaulted. The arcades in the chancel are carried on round and cluster piers, and have double-chamfered arches. The reredos is in marble and dates from 1903. The choir stalls date from 1919 and are in Perpendicular style. The chapel screens are in Decorated style. The chancel screen and the pulpit date from 1919 and are in wrought and cast iron. The font consists of a marble drum with panels. Much of the stained glass is by C. E. Kempe, dating from 1896 and other dates. There is a window in the north transept dated 1922 by Edward Moore. Also in the church are memorials, most of which are to the Fletcher family. The three-manual organ was made in 1932 by Rushworth and Dreaper of Liverpool.

== Present day ==
The church was listed at Grade II* on 31 July 1996. Grade II* is the middle of the three gradings given by English Heritage, and is granted to buildings that "are particularly important buildings of more than special interest". Commenting on its design, the architectural historians Richard Pollard and Nikolaus Pevsner in the Buildings of England series say of the architects that "it is one of their most stimulating churches".

The church arranges regular services on Sundays and during the week. It has a choir and a Mothers' Union, and runs a Sunday School, Scouts, Guides and associated groups.

== See also ==
- Grade II* listed buildings in Greater Manchester
- Listed buildings in Atherton, Greater Manchester
- List of churches in Greater Manchester
- List of ecclesiastical works by Paley and Austin
