= Tommy Butler (footballer) =

English footballer

Personal information
- Full name: Thomas Butler
- Date of birth: 28 April 1918
- Place of birth: Atherton, England
- Date of death: 11 September 2009 (aged 91)
- Place of death: Wigan, Greater Manchester, England
- Position: Right wing

Senior career*
Years	Team	Apps	(Gls)
1936–1937	Bolton Wanderers	18	(6)
1937	Macclesfield Town	25	(2)
1937–1939	Oldham Athletic	45	(9)
1939	Middlesbrough	2	(0)
1946–1947	Oldham Athletic	30	(3)
1947–1953	Accrington Stanley	218	(26)
1953–1954	Wigan Athletic	32	(6)
Total		370	(52)
- * Club domestic league appearances and goals

Thomas Butler (28 April 1918 – 11 September 2009) was an English retired professional footballer who played as a right winger in the Football League.
