= Chowbent Chapel =

Unitarian church in Greater Manchester, England

Coordinates: 53°31′28″N 2°29′08″W

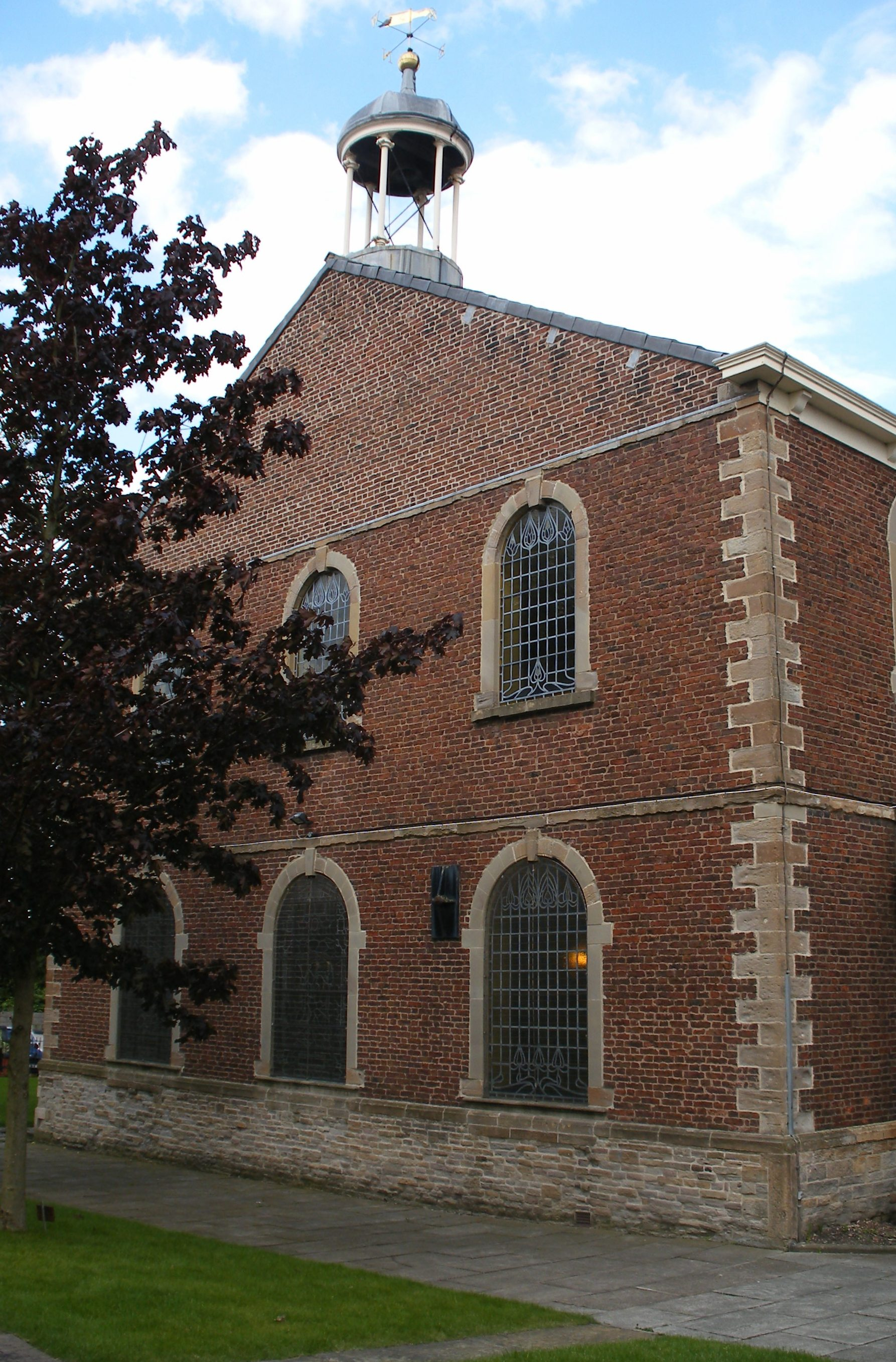
Chowbent Chapel is a plain building made of rustic brick with stone details, round arched windows and a small cupola on the gable end.

Chowbent Chapel is an active Unitarian place of worship in Atherton, Greater Manchester, England. It was built in 1721 and is the oldest place of worship in the town. It is a member of the General Assembly of Unitarian and Free Christian Churches, the umbrella organisation for British Unitarians. The chapel was granted Grade II* Listed status in 1966.

== History ==
The origins of Chowbent Chapel are a consequence of events that happened in 1715. The first chapel in Atherton, a chapel of ease to Leigh Parish Church was a "small brick edifice", dedicated to St. John the Baptist at Chowbent. It was built in 1645 "on land owned and loaned by “Ye Lord of Atherton", John Atherton, a supporter of religious dissent. Sometimes referred to as the Old Bent Chapel, it was not consecrated and used by a Presbyterian congregation. The chapel was also used by the vicar of Leigh who used a Bible and Book of Common Prayer which were kept there for his use.

It was a long, low building having three windows and a porch on the south side and a large window in the east gable ... The pulpit was of the old-fashioned Puritan three-tier style.

During the 1715 Jacobite rising, its fourth minister, James Wood and members of his congregation were asked to guard the bridge at Walton-le-Dale and the ford at Penwortham near Preston against the supporters of the Old Pretender who were marching on Preston. The Chowbenters were successful but in doing so offended Richard Atherton who would inherit the Atherton manor and on whose land the chapel was built. In 1721 Richard Atherton, a staunch supporter of James II, expelled the congregation on political grounds.

== Architecture ==
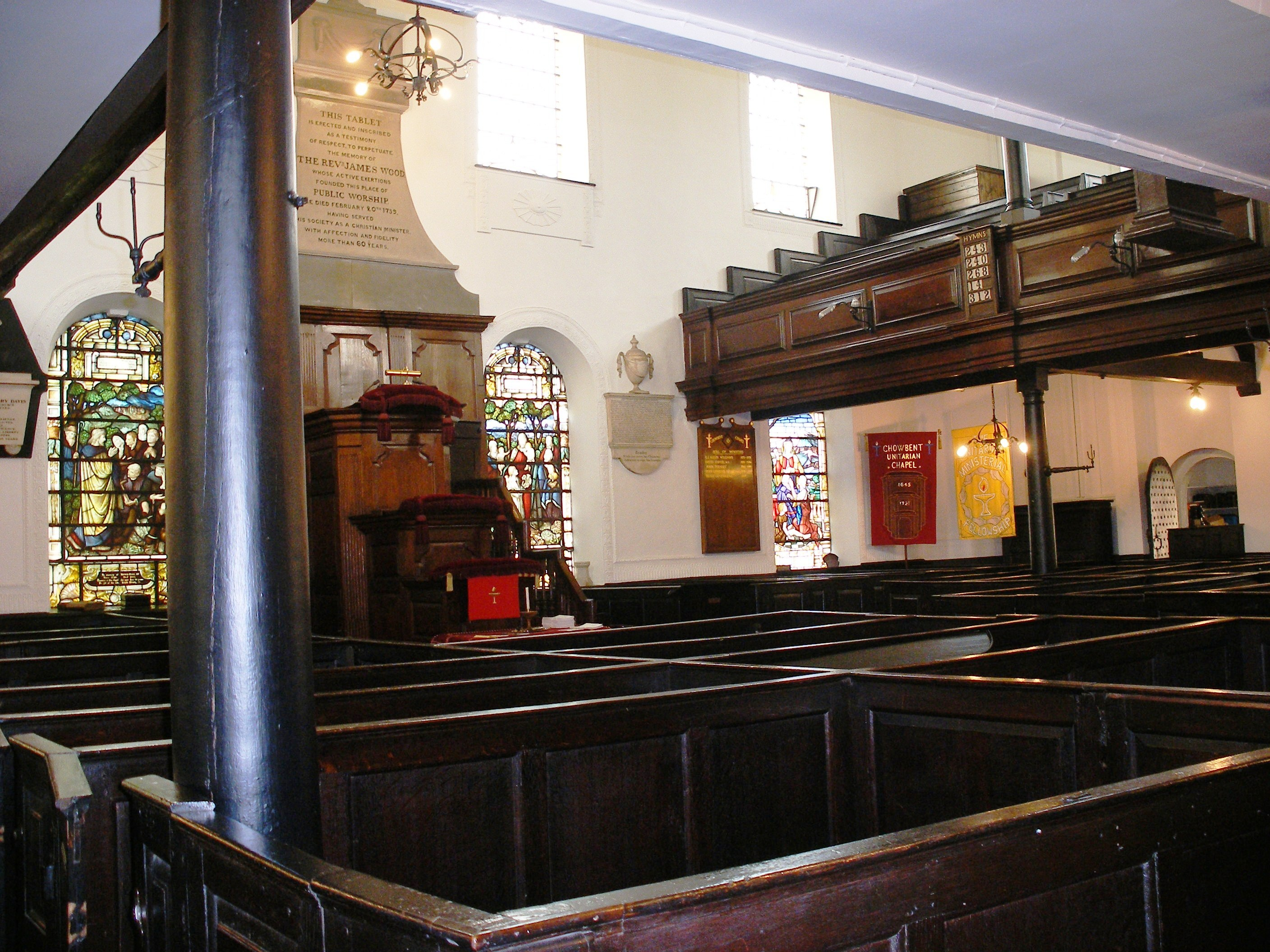
Chowbent Chapel interior, showing pulpit and gallery

The chapel dates from 1721 on land donated by Nathan Mort of neighbouring Alder House It is built in rustic brick, in Flemish bond on a rubble sandstone plinth, with stone quoins, an eaves cornice and a slate roof. The side elevations have three bays and the rear four bays, both have round-arched windows. On the roof is a small cupola housing a single bell. A two-storey extension was added on the south side in 1901. Its facade has a gable pediment with an oculus within the tympanum. There is a fanlight above the double doors with a sundial above and a commemorative plaque above that.

Nikolaus Pevsner considers the chapel "has the best-preserved C18 ecclesiastical interior in South Lancashire". The original box pews are in place upstairs and down, there is a three tier pulpit on the north wall. The galleries on the east, south and west sides are accessed by staircases with turned balusters. The galleries are supported by six turned Doric oak columns which continue through the gallery to support the plaster ceiling. A nail studded oak door separating the chapel from the vestry is thought to be from the original 1645 chapel. Other surviving artefacts brought from the 1645 building are the communion table and two Commonwealth silver communion cups gifted by Robert Mort in 1654. The cups are not kept at the chapel and are rarely displayed. Some of the stained glass windows are by Shrigley and Hunt.

When newly built, the chapel's oak rafters and trusses were open to view, its walls were whitewashed and the windows contained leaded panes of clear glass set in a lozenge pattern. An organ was installed in 1806 as up to then the only music was the chanting of psalms. An organ by Young of Manchester was installed in 1901 when the chapel was enlarged.

== Community ==
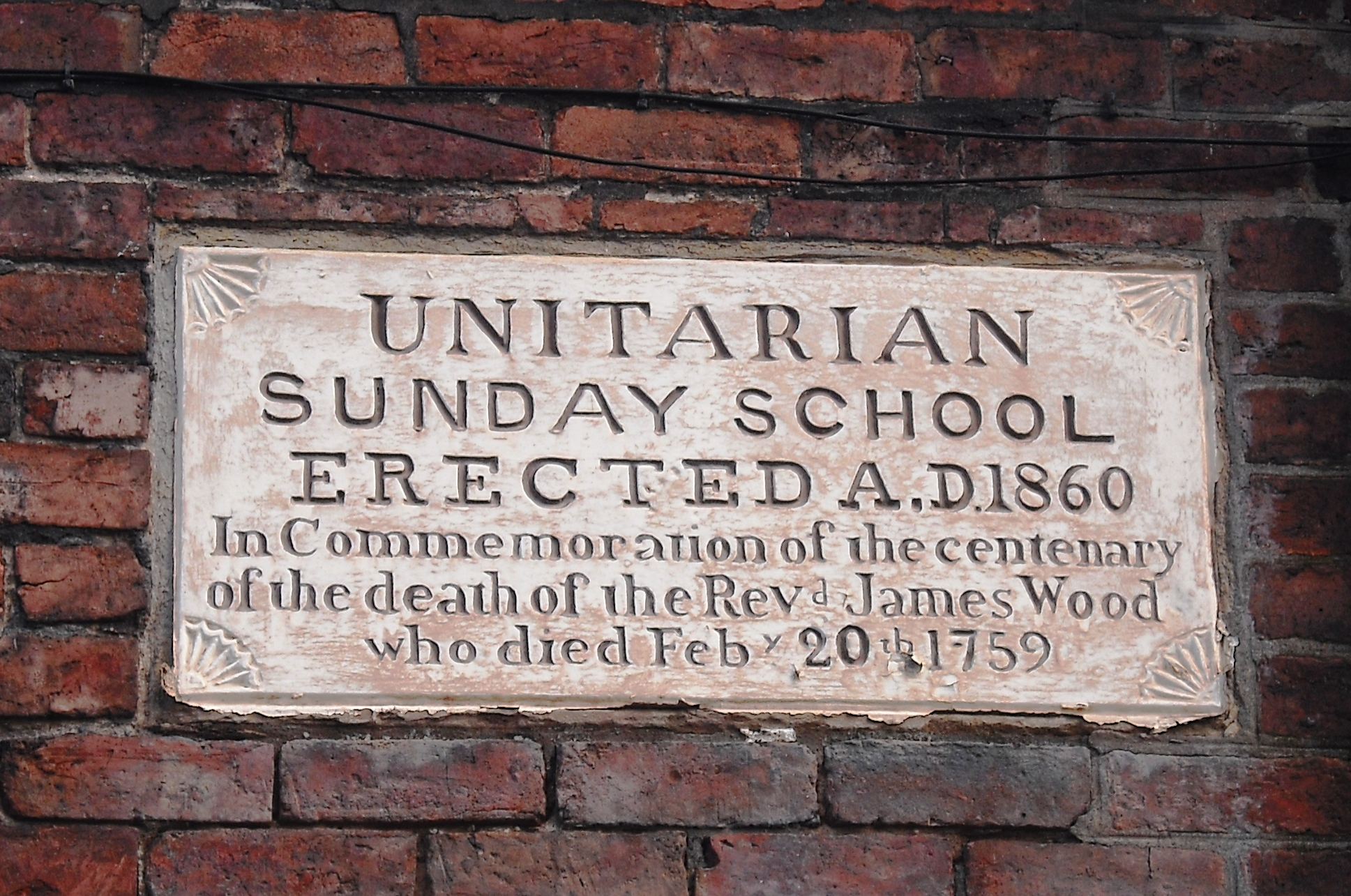
Wall plaque for the Unitarian Sunday School, 1860

A schoolroom was opened in the minister's house shortly after the chapel opened. It was extended in 1860 and again in 1890. Before 1900 a library provided by the chapel was opened in Chowbent School for the inhabitants of the town. Its collection of 4000 volumes was donated to Atherton's Carnegie library when it opened in 1905.

== Ministers ==
Apart from Wood, other notable ministers of the chapel included Harry Toulmin (1766 – 1823) who moved to America and became Secretary of State of Kentucky and Thomas Walker Horsfield (1792–1837) a historian and topographer.

== See also ==
- List of churches in Greater Manchester
- Grade II* listed buildings in Greater Manchester
- Listed buildings in Atherton, Greater Manchester
