= St Anne's Church, Hindsford =

Coordinates: 53.5188°N 2.4812°W

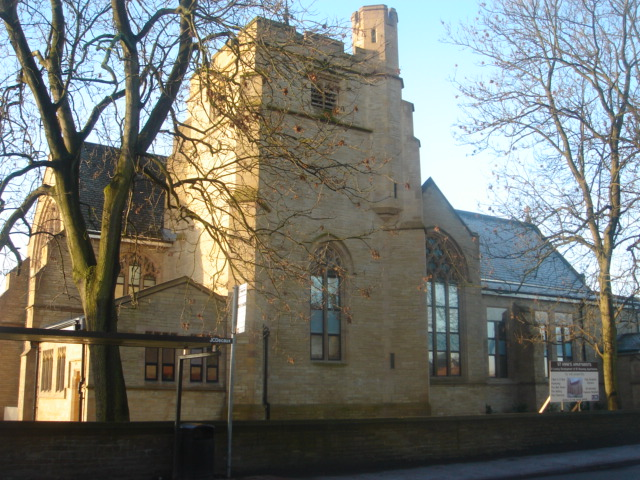
- St Anne's Church, Hindsford

- Location in Greater Manchester
- OS grid reference: SD 682 026
- Location: Tyldesley Road, Hindsford, Atherton, Greater Manchester
- Country: England
- Denomination: Anglican

History
- Status: Former parish church

Architecture
- Functional status: Redundant
- Heritage designation: Grade II
- Designated: 18 October 1991
- Architect: Austin and Paley
- Architectural type: Church
- Style: Gothic Revival
- Groundbreaking: 1889
- Completed: 1901
- Construction cost: £9,000
- Closed: 1999

Specifications
- Materials: Sandstone, Westmorland slate roofs

St Anne's Church is a redundant Anglican parish church in Tyldesley Road, Hindsford, Atherton, Greater Manchester, England. It is recorded in the National Heritage List for England as a designated Grade II listed building.

== History ==
The forerunner to this church was a mission church, also dedicated to St Anne, built on Swan Island in 1873. In 1884 Hindsford became a parish in its own right, and in 1889 the foundation stone was laid for this church. It was designed by the Lancaster architects Austin and Paley. The church was completed in 1901 at a cost of £9,000 (equivalent to £960,000 in 2025). It provided seating for 450 people, and was built on land given by Lord Lilford. The church was declared redundant on 1 November 1999, and was divided into flats in 2003–04.

== Architecture ==
The church is constructed in sandstone with Westmorland slate roofs. Its architectural style is Gothic Revival. The building is orientated northwest–southeast; in the following description ritual orientation is used. The plan consists of a four bay nave, north and south aisles, a south porch, a south transept, and a two-bay chancel with a tower and vestry to the south. The tower stands on a chamfered plinth. It has diagonal buttresses. one of which rises to an octagonal stair turret. The two-light bell openings are louvred and square-headed. The parapet is embattled, and the tower is surmounted by a pyramidal roof with a weathervane. The windows contain Decorated tracery.

== See also ==
- Listed buildings in Atherton, Greater Manchester
- List of ecclesiastical works by Austin and Paley (1895–1914)
