= Atherton, Greater Manchester =

Town in Greater Manchester, England

Atherton
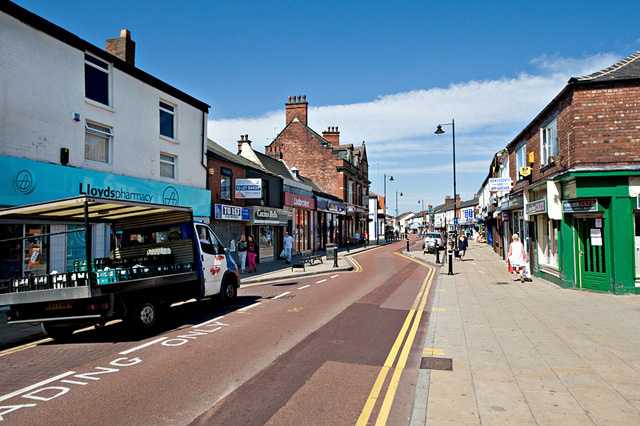
- Market Street

- Location within Greater Manchester
- Area: 1.656 sq mi (4.29 km^{2})
- Population: 22,000
  - Density: 13,285/sq mi (5,129/km^{2})
- OS grid reference: SD672030
  - London: 171 mi (275 km) SSE
- Metropolitan borough: Wigan
- Metropolitan county: Greater Manchester
- Region: North West
- Country: England
- Sovereign state: United Kingdom
- Post town: MANCHESTER
- Postcode district: M46
- Dialling code: 01942
- Police: Greater Manchester
- Fire: Greater Manchester
- Ambulance: North West
- UK Parliament: Leigh and Atherton

Atherton (/ˈæðərtən/) is a town in the Metropolitan Borough of Wigan, Greater Manchester, England, historically part of Lancashire. It is 5 miles (8 km) south of Bolton, 7 miles (11 km) east of Wigan, and 10 miles (16 km) northwest of Manchester. During the Industrial Revolution, the town was a key part of the Manchester Coalfield.

Atherton was associated with coal mining and nail manufacture from the 14th century, encouraged by outcropping coal seams. At the beginning of the 20th century, the town was described as "the centre of a district of collieries, cotton mills and iron-works, which cover the surface of the country with their inartistic buildings and surroundings, and are linked together by the equally unlovely dwellings of the people". Atherton's last deep coal mine closed in 1966, and the last cotton mill closed in 1999. Today the town is the third-largest retail centre in the Borough of Wigan; almost 20% of those employed in the area work in the wholesale and retail trades, although there is still some significant manufacturing industry in the town.

Evidence has been discovered of a Roman road passing through the area, on the ancient route between Coccium (Wigan) and Mamucium (Manchester). Following the Anglo-Saxon invasion of England, Atherton, which is built on and around seven brooks, became part of the manor of Warrington until the Norman Conquest, when it became a township or vill in the ancient parish of Leigh. Since 1974 the town has been part of the Metropolitan Borough of Wigan, a local government district of the Metropolitan County of Greater Manchester and since 2024 it has been part of the Leigh and Atherton parliamentary constituency.

== History ==
=== Toponymy ===
Atherton was recorded as Aderton in 1212 and 1242, and Atherton in 1259. Opinions differ as to the derivation of the name. One is the farmstead or village of a man named Aethelhere, an Old English personal name and the suffix tun, meaning an enclosure, farmstead or manor estate; another is adre, Saxon for little brook with the suffix tun. Either is possible as Atherton is bounded by brooks to the west and south, and crossed by several others. The western boundary is Hindsford Brook, originally named Goderic Brook after a Saxon saint.

The Chow – recorded as Chew, Cholle and Chowl – family were tenants of the Athertons living at the valley by Chanters Brook. This part of the township became known as Chow's Bent but the meaning of Bent has been lost, perhaps a bend or slope. It was referred to in the 14th century as Chollebynt or Shollebent. Chowbent, or Bent, was the name given to the built-up part of Atherton from the mid-17th century for at least 300 years. As the population grew, the town was called Atherton, although the names Chowbent or Bent are used by locals.

=== Early history ===
Evidence of a Roman road and Bronze Age settlement have been found in and around the area. The Roman road between Manchester and Wigan is shown on the 1849 6" OS map crossing Miller's Lane at 90 degrees about halfway down. The site of Gadbury Brickworks at Gibfield Colliery has been excavated, and evidence of Roman and possibly earlier settlements found.

=== Manor ===
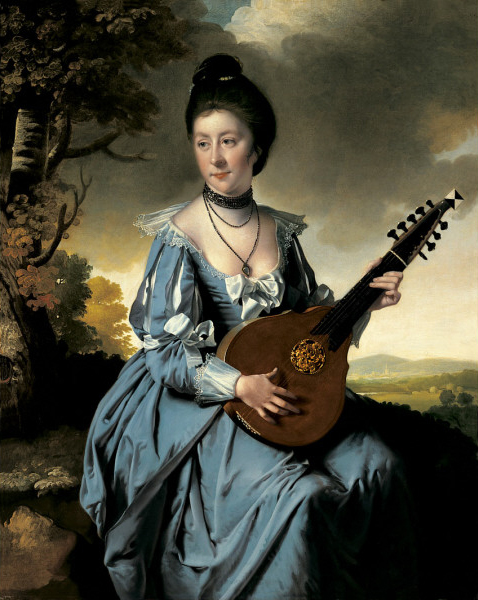
Richard Atherton's daughter Elizabeth, Mrs Robert Gwillym, painted by Joseph Wright of Derby

The manor was held by the Atherton family from the de Botelers, whose chief manor was at Warrington. William and Nicholas Atherton fought at the Battle of Agincourt in 1415. The manor house was situated towards the south of the ancient township. Christopher Saxton's map shows a medieval deer park in the time of Elizabeth I. "Mad" Richard Atherton, the last direct male descendant of the Athertons is remembered for two events; his expulsion of the congregation from the first Atherton Chapel in 1721, and building Atherton Hall on a grand scale, to designs by architect William Wakefield. Work on the hall started in 1723 and was not finished until 1743. The carriage drive from the hall led over Lion's Bridge down an avenue to gates which faced the parish church in Leigh where the Athertons had a chapel. Richard Vernon Atherton was the last of the Atherton male line. He married Elizabeth Farington and had a daughter named Elizabeth.

The Atherton family's association with the township ended with Richard Atherton's death in 1726. His daughter, Elizabeth, married Robert Gwillym and their son, Robert Vernon Atherton, married Henrietta Maria Legh. They had five children; the sons died young, and their eldest daughter Henrietta Maria Atherton married Thomas Powys, 2nd Baron Lilford whose father was ennobled by Pitt the Younger in 1797, taking the title of Baron Lilford. He left his estates to his son, Thomas Atherton Powys. The Atherton estate was inherited by Lord Lilford, who preferred to live at his family seat, Lilford Hall in Northamptonshire. Lord Lilford could not afford the upkeep of another house and Atherton Hall was put up for sale but, after failing to sell, it was demolished in 1824. Some outbuildings were left standing and are private property still known as Atherton Hall.

=== Two battles ===
The area was divided in its allegiance during the Civil War. In 1642, men of Chowbent were on their way to Leigh Church when word came that James Stanley, 7th Earl of Derby's Royalist troops were marching through Leigh, probably en route for Manchester. The men of Chowbent armed themselves and drove the Earl's men back to Lowton Common, killing some, wounding others and taking prisoner about 200 men: "... we are all upon our guard, and the Naylors of Chowbent, instead of making Nayles, have busied themselves making Bills and Battle Axes." (Civil War tracts of Lancashire, Chetham Society Series, vol II).

In 1715, during the Jacobite rising the supporters of the Old Pretender were marching on Preston. General Charles Wills wrote to Minister Wood of Atherton Chapel asking him to raise a force to be at Cuerden Green the following day, 12 November. Minister Wood led a force of Chowbent men who were given the job of guarding the bridge over the River Ribble at Walton-le-Dale and a ford at Penwortham, which they defended successfully. The Highlanders were routed, and for his efforts Parson James Wood was given a £100 annuity (equivalent to £18,900 in 2025) by Parliament and the title "The General" by his congregation.

=== Industrial history ===
Atherton, along with neighbouring Shakerley, was associated with coal mining and nail manufacture. Alexander Naylor was taxed on his goods in 1332, showing the industry was present for at least 600 years. Encouraged by the proximity of outcrops of coal, iron was brought from Derbyshire, Yorkshire and Spain. Several types of nails were made, including lath nails, slate nails, thatching nails and sparrowbills. The nail smithies manufactured ploughs and scythes; their products were taken by pack horse to be sold in Manchester, Denbigh, Clitheroe and Kendal. The nail industry developed into the manufacture of nuts and bolts. Thomas Blakemore was the first in 1843 and by 1853 there were eight manufacturers of nuts and bolts including James Prestwich and Robert Parker. Some nut and bolt manufacturers also made spindles and flyers for spinning machinery. Collier Brook Bolt Works on Bag Lane dating from 1856 survives and is a Grade II listed building.

Coal had been mined for several hundred years in numerous shallow shafts and adits, but took on greater importance when in 1776 Robert Vernon Atherton leased the coal rights to Thomas Guest from Leigh and John Fletcher from Bolton. In 1845 the era of deep mining commenced with the sinking of Fletcher's Lover's Lane pit at Howe Bridge. The Crombouke Day-Eye, a drift mine accessing the shallow Brassy and Crombouke mines, opened in 1870 and closed in 1907. (A coal seam was referred to as a "mine" in this part of Lancashire.) By the early 1870s Fletcher, Burrows and Company's Howe Bridge Colliery, the biggest of the three Howe Bridge pits, was sunk to the Black & White, or Seven Foot mine. The pit closed in 1959. Gibfield Colliery, situated alongside the Bolton and Leigh Railway, was working in 1829, and coal was mined from the Trencherbone mine. Forty years later a 1,169-foot (356 m) shaft was sunk to Arley Mine. The pit closed in 1963. In September 1913 the first pit head baths in the country were opened at Gibfield. Chanters Colliery was in Hindsford, where 1,120-foot (340 m) shafts were sunk to the Trencherbone mine in 1854. In the late 1890s shafts were deepened to 1,800 feet (550 m) to reach the Arley mine. Atherton had its share of mining disasters — on 11 February 1850 five men died in a gas explosion caused by a lighted candle at Gibfield, and 27 men died at Lovers Lane Colliery after a firedamp explosion caused by blown-out shot on 28 March 1872. On 6 March 1957 eight men died at Chanters Colliery after an explosion of gas. Chanters closed in 1966 bringing the era of deep coal mining in the town to an end. In 1908, the Lancashire and Cheshire Coal Owners Association opened Howe Bridge Mines Rescue Station.

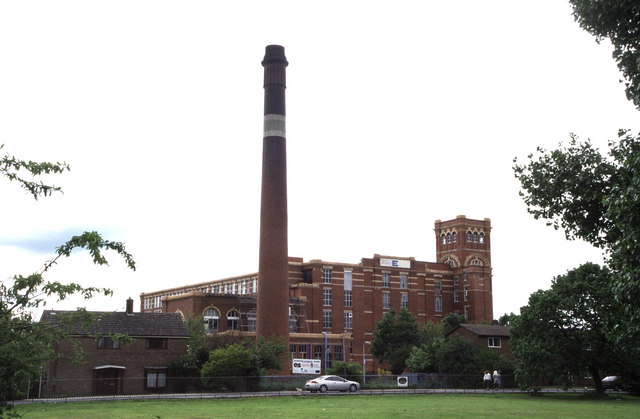
Ena Mill in 2000

The cotton mills grew out of a cottage spinning and weaving industry that was widespread across the district. As industrialisation gathered pace, local weavers felt threatened by the advent of powered looms, and in April 1812 a mob smashed the machines and burnt down a new factory, Westhoughton Mill, in neighbouring Westhoughton. For this, the Luddites, three men and a boy of 14, were tried at Lancaster Assizes and hanged. Fustian was woven and after 1827 silk also was brought from Manchester. In 1838, James Burton begun building a series of mills which culminated in 1860 with cotton mills on both sides of the Hindsford Brook including Lodge Mill. Dan Lane Spinning and Doubling Mills were built in the 1840s and lasted until the 1950s. Howe Bridge Spinning Mills, the largest complex in Atherton was started in 1868 and the last mill built in 1919. It closed as a textile factory in early 1999. Mills built in the 20th century were Laburnum Mills in 1905 (closed 1980), and Ena Mill in 1908 which closed in 1999. The Ena Mill, now converted for other uses, is a Grade II listed building.

== Governance ==
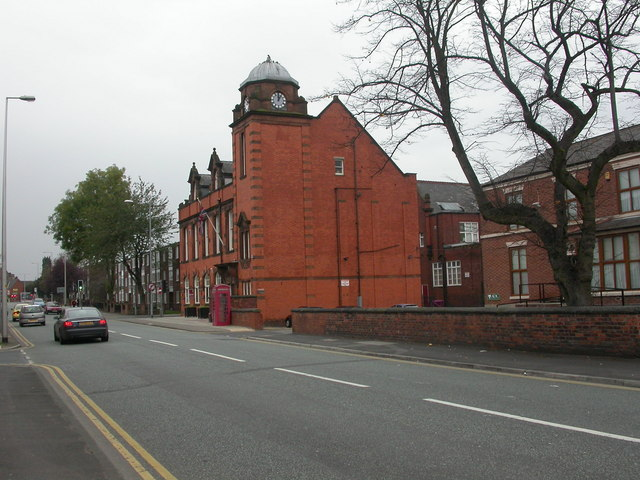
Atherton Town Hall

The town is represented by 2 electoral wards with 6 councillors in the Metropolitan Borough of Wigan, Atherton North & Atherton South with Lilford. The wards each elect three councillors to the 75-member metropolitan borough council/local authority.

Historically, Atherton was in the Hundred of West Derby, a judicial division of southwest Lancashire. Atherton was one of the six townships or vills that made up the ancient ecclesiastical parish of Leigh. The townships existed before the parish. The manor of Atherton was held by the Atherton family from the de Botelers, whose chief manor was at Warrington.

Under the terms of the Poor Law Amendment Act 1834 the townships were part of the Leigh Poor Law Union which was established on 26 January 1837 comprising an area covering the whole of the ancient parish of Leigh and part of Winwick. Workhouses existed in Pennington, Culcheth, Tyldesley, Lowton and Hag Fold in Atherton, but the Leigh Union workhouse at Atherleigh replaced them in the 1850s. In 1863 the Local Government Act 1858 was adopted for the township, meaning it was governed by a local board of health, a type of regulatory body responsible for standards of hygiene and sanitation in the township. In 1894 part of the township was added to Leigh Urban District; the remainder became Atherton Urban District. The urban district was abolished in 1974 under the Local Government Act 1972, when the area became part of the Metropolitan Borough of Wigan, a local government district of the metropolitan county of Greater Manchester.

There has been much protest to the local government arrangements, with a significant proportion of Atherton residents having a stronger affinity to nearby bordering areas of Bolton and Salford, than Wigan itself. This is seen in the local councillor representation of 3 independent councillors for Atherton in a usually strong Labour voting area.

== Geography ==
Atherton

Climate chart (precipitation, max. and min. temperature)
J	F	M	A	M	J	J	A	S	O	N	D
70 6 1	50 7 1	60 9 3	50 12 4	60 15 7	70 18 10	70 20 12	80 20 12	70 17 10	80 14 8	80 9 4	80 7 2
- █ Average max. and min. temperatures in °C
- █ Precipitation totals in mm
- Source: Atherton Weather, 2008, archived from the original on 8 June 2011
Imperial conversion
J	F	M	A	M	J	J	A	S	O	N	D
2.8 43 34	2 45 34	2.4 48 37	2 54 39	2.4 59 45	2.8 64 50	2.8 68 54	3.1 68 54	2.8 63 50	3.1 57 46	3.1 48 39	3.1 45 36
- █ Average max. and min. temperatures in °F
- █ Precipitation totals in inches

At 53°31′23″N 2°29′44″W (53.5231°, −2.4955°), and 171 miles (275 km) northwest of central London, Atherton is situated 7 miles (11 km) east of Wigan and 10 miles (16 km) west-northwest of the city of Manchester, at the eastern end of the Metropolitan Borough of Wigan.

Atherton, which includes Hindsford to the southeast, Howe Bridge in the southwest, and Hag Fold in the north, is generally low lying. The soil is clay in much of the township. The southwest of the town is 100 feet (30 m) above sea level, rising to 250 feet (76 m) in the north. Atherton is built around seven brooks: the Shakerley Brook forms the western boundary with Tyldesley; Chanters Brook flows through the area known as "The Valley"; Knight's Brook (Bag Lane); Colliers Brook; Small Brook is the boundary with Westleigh; Westhoughton Brook forms the boundary with Daisy Hill; and Red Waters Brook. The underlying rocks are the coal measures of the Manchester Coalfield.

Atherton's climate is generally temperate, like the rest of Greater Manchester. The mean highest and lowest temperatures (13.2 °C (55.8 °F) and 6.4 °C (43.5 °F)) are slightly above the national average, while the annual rainfall (806.6 millimetres (31.76 in)) and average hours of sunshine (1394.5 hours) are respectively above and below the national averages.

The town is situated on the old high road, now the A579 from Bolton to Leigh. The A577 runs from the town to Tyldesley in one direction and to Wigan in the other.

== Demography ==
Atherton Compared
2001 Census	Atherton	Wigan MB	GM Urban Area	England
Total population	20,302	301,415	2,240,230	49,138,831
White	98.5%	98.7%	90.3%	90.9%
Asian	0.5%	0.4%	6.2%	4.6%
Black	0.2%	0.2%	1.3%	2.3%
Source: Office for National Statistics

At the time of the 2001 United Kingdom census, according to the Office for National Statistics, the Urban Subdivision of Atherton was part of the Greater Manchester Urban Area and had a total resident population of 20,302, of which 9,908 (48.8%) were male and 10,394 (51.2%) were female, living in 8,745 households. The settlement occupied 429 hectares (1,060 acres), compared with 431 hectares (1,070 acres) in the 1991 census. Its population density was 47.32 inhabitants per hectare (19.15/acre) compared with an average of 40.20 inhabitants per hectare (16.27/acre) across the Greater Manchester Urban Area. The median age of the population was 40, compared with 36 within the Greater Manchester Urban Area and 37 across England and Wales.

The majority of the population of Atherton were born in England (96.29%); 1.56% were born elsewhere within the United Kingdom, 0.89% within the rest of the European Union, and 1.26% elsewhere in the world.

Data on religious beliefs across the town in the 2001 census show that 86.6% declared themselves to be Christian, 7.2% said they held no religion, and 0.3% reported themselves as Hindu.

=== Population change ===
Population growth in Atherton 1777–2001
Year	1777	1801	1811	1821	1831	1841	1851	1861	1871	1881	1891
Population	2,200	3,249	3,894	4,145	4,181	4,475	4,659	5,907	7,531	12,602	15,833
Year	1901	1911	1921	1931	1939	1951	1961	1971	1981	1991	2001
Population	16,211	18,982	19,856	19,989	20,098	20,596	19,756	no data	22,032	21,696	20,302
Parish 1777–1861 • Township 1871–1891 • Urban District 1901–1961 • Urban Subdivision 1981–2001

== Economy ==
Atherton is within the Manchester Travel to Work Area. The town is within the Manchester Larger Urban Zone.

At the time of the 2001 Census, there were 8,755 people (43.1%) in employment who were resident in Atherton. Of these, 19.65% worked in the wholesale and retail trades, including the repair of motor vehicles; 19.28% worked within the manufacturing industry, and 10.27% worked within the health and social work sector. The census recorded the economic activity of residents aged 16–74 as 36.7% in full-time employment, 11.0% in part-time employment, 6.8% self-employed, 4.0% unemployed, 1.7% students with jobs, 3.2% students without jobs, 14.6% retired, 6.5% looking after home or family, 11.8% permanently sick or disabled, and 3.8% economically inactive for other reasons. The 4.0% unemployment rate was high compared with the national rate of 3.3%. According to the Office for National Statistics estimates, during the period between April 2001 and March 2002, the average gross income of households was £380 per week (£19,760 per year), substantially less than the £470 per week (£24,440) for the rest of the North West. The average car ownership per household was 1.01, compared with 0.93 across the Greater Manchester Urban Area; 43.74% of households owned a single car or van, and 30.76% owned none.

Atherton, the third-largest retail centre in the Wigan Borough, has a small pedestrian shopping centre. Most shops front on to Market Street and date from late Victorian times, the majority operated by small independent retailers, although there is a supermarket that brings customers into the town centre. Older, low cost, mostly terraced housing, surrounds the centre of town. Bolts and fastenings are still manufactured in Atherton by Smith Bullough, one of the few remaining bolt and nut manufacturers in the UK.

As of 2009, a business park is planned for the former Gibfield Colliery site.

== Landmarks ==
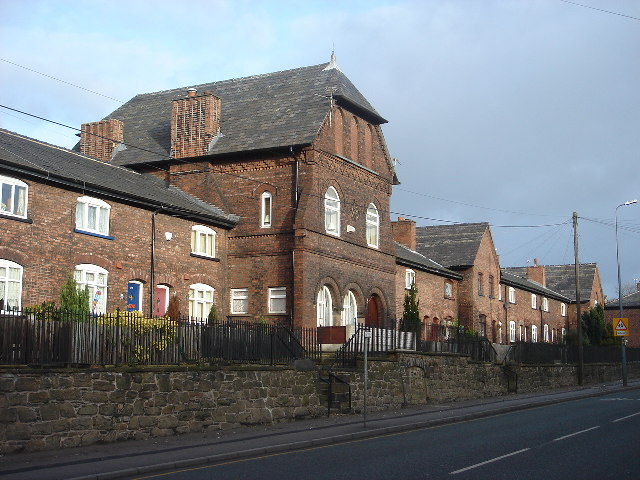
Howe Bridge model village. The tall building in the centre is the miners' bath house.

There are several historic listed buildings in and around Atherton, some—but not all—located in the area referred to as Chowbent. These include the 17th-century Alder House, Chowbent Chapel, St John the Baptist's Church (1879), and Chanters Farmhouse. The name "Chanters" derives from a chantry granted by the Bishop of Lichfield in 1360 to Sir William de Atherton. The name is also associated with a bridge over the Hindsford Brook and a former colliery.

A pseudo-Egyptian obelisk near the south-east corner of the parish church, similar to one in Leigh, was probably built for Robert Vernon Atherton in 1781. It was restored in 1867, twelve years before the church was completed. The obelisk is a Grade II listed structure.

Between 1873 and 1875, the mineowners Fletcher Burrows built a small model village at Howe Bridge, comprising cottages, shops, a village club, and a bath house for their employees. This Victorian village, located on either side of Leigh Road, together with St Michael and All Angel's Church, forms a designated conservation area. Ena Mill, one of Atherton's large spinning mills, complete with its chimney, survives as a reminder of the town's textile industry.

Atherton's war memorial is a cenotaph at the intersection of Leigh Road and Hamilton Street. It was designed by architect Arthur John Hope and constructed from Darley Dale stone. The memorial was unveiled in January 1922 by Private J. Roylance, a soldier who was blinded in action during the First World War.

== Transport ==
The Bolton to Leigh road was turnpiked in about 1770 and a toll gate was installed on the Atherton boundary on Bolton Road. Shakerley Lane toll road emerged near Green Hall on Bolton Road, and was built to get coal from the Shakerley pits to the turnpike road.

In 1825, the Bolton and Leigh Railway received Royal Assent and the single-track railway was opened in 1828 bringing the railway to the western side of the township where it was close to the coal mines at Howe Bridge and Gibfield. Railway stations opened at Atherton Bag Lane and further south at Atherleigh The line was connected to the Liverpool and Manchester Railway by the Kenyon and Leigh Junction Railway in 1831 and connected to the Tyldesley–Wigan line in 1883 when a station was opened at Chowbent renamed Howe Bridge in 1901. The Lancashire and Yorkshire Railway's line from Manchester to Southport passes to the north of Atherton and Atherton Station which was opened in 1887–88 remains open.

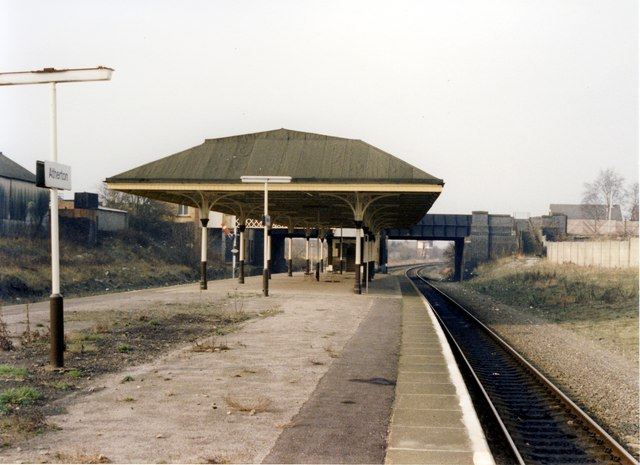
Atherton railway station

In 1900, a bill authorising the South Lancashire Tramways Company to construct over 62 miles (100 km) of tramway in southern Lancashire was given Royal Assent. However, by November 1900 the South Lancashire Electric Traction and Power Company had acquired the shares. The first section of tramway opened on 20 October 1902 between Lowton and Four Lanes Ends via Leigh and Atherton. The company got into financial difficulty and in turn became Lancashire United Tramways later Lancashire United Transport (LUT). LUT had headquarters and a large depot in Howe Bridge. On 16 December 1933, the last tram ran from Leigh to Four Lane Ends. The following day trolley buses took over.

Public transport in Atherton is co-ordinated by the Transport for Greater Manchester. There are public transport links by rail from Atherton and Hag Fold stations to Wigan and Manchester operated by Northern.

Buses in Atherton operate to Bolton, Leigh, Wigan, Manchester, the Trafford Centre and Middlebrook Retail and Leisure Complex operated from September 2023 as part of the Manchester Bee Network.

== Education ==
The first school in Atherton was Chowbent Grammar School founded before 1654, followed by Chowbent Chapel School in 1734. Lane Top National School opened in 1840 and Chowbent Unitarian School and Hindsford St Anne's in 1860. Howe Bridge School opened in 1869 and St Philip's a year later. An undenominational school in Lee Street opened in 1871 followed by St George's and Sacred Heart School in Hindsford in 1873. In the 1890s, the technical school originally opened as a school for science and art, followed by St Richard's in 1891 and Flapper Fold Higher Grade School in 1893. Green Hall Special School opened in 1957, and a new infant school was opened on Lodge Lane for Sacred Heart. Meadowbank Primary School can also be found on Flapper Fold Lane, marking the boundary between Atherton and Hag Fold. Hesketh Fletcher Senior School opened in 1967 and closed on 31 August 2011. Atherton High School opened in 2012.

List of schools in Atherton
School	Locality	Description	Ofsted	Website
Atherton St George's C.E. Primary School	Atherton	Primary school	130300	website
Chowbent Primary School	Atherton	Primary school	106443	website
Hindsford C.E. Primary School	Hindsford, Atherton	Primary school	106441	website
Meadowbank Primary and Nursery School	Atherton	Primary school	106425	website
Parklee Community School	Atherton	Primary school	106426	website
Sacred Heart R.C. Primary School	Hindsford, Atherton	Primary school	106499	website
St Michael's C.E. Primary School, Howe Bridge	Howe Bridge, Atherton	Primary school	106478	website
St Philip's C.E. Primary School	Atherton	Primary school	106515	website
St Richard's Catholic Primary School	Atherton	Primary school	106498	website
Hesketh Fletcher C.E. High School (closed)	Atherton	Secondary school	106536	website
Rowan Tree Primary School (Formerly New Greenhall School)	Atherton	Special school	131295	website

== Religion ==
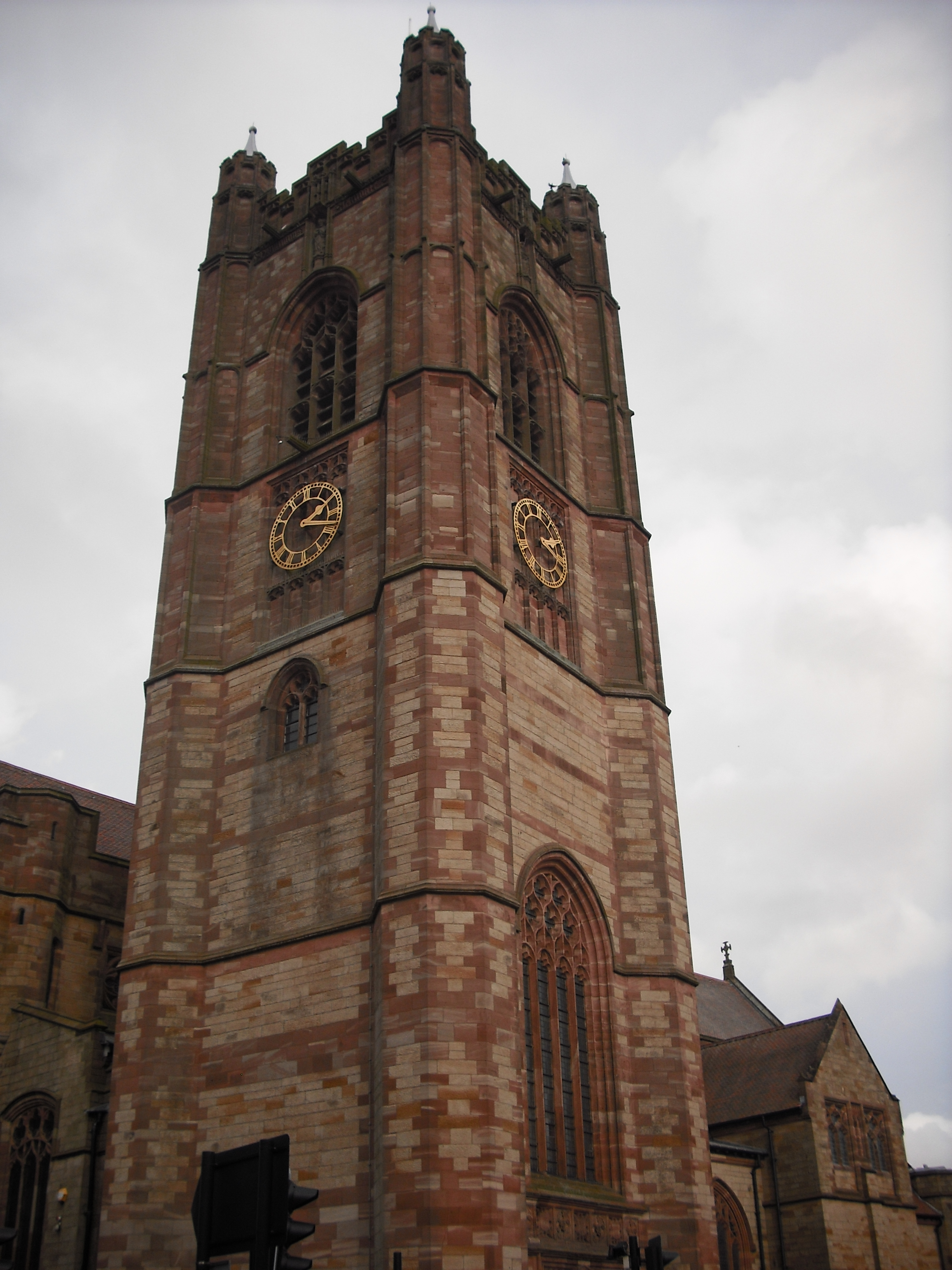
The tower of Atherton Parish Church

Three chapels or churches have been built on the site of the Parish Church of St John the Baptist. A chapel was built in 1645 by John Atherton. It is sometimes referred to as the Old Bent Chapel. It remained unconsecrated and was used by the Presbyterians. In 1721 Richard Atherton expelled the dissenters and the chapel was consecrated in 1723 by the Bishop of Sodor and Man. A new chapel on the site was consecrated by the Bishop of Chester in 1814. The present church dedicated to St John the Baptist was consecrated in 1879. The church, designed by Austin and Paley, is built out of Runcorn stone. It measures 60 by 127 feet (18 by 39 m) and the square 24-foot-wide (7.3 m) tower rises to 120 feet (37 m). The fabric of the church has suffered from mining subsidence.

The New Bent or Chowbent Chapel, the earliest Nonconformist chapel in Atherton, was built in 1721 and opened in 1722. The chapel was built by the Presbyterian congregation after it was expelled from the first chapel.

A mission occupying a barn in Hindsford was replaced in 1901 by St Anne's Church designed by Austin and Paley. It has since been converted to residential use. St Michael and All Angels at Howe Bridge was built in 1877. There are chapels of the Wesleyan, Baptist, Independent Methodist, and Primitive Methodist denominations; a Congregational Church at Howe Bridge was opened in 1904. Roman Catholics celebrated mass in a loft behind the Star and Garter public house on Tyldesley Square until Sacred Heart Church opened in Hindsford in 1869. The site was given by Lord Lilford and building materials were donated by John Holland, manager of Yew Tree Colliery in Tyldesley. It served the growing Catholic population in Hindsford and Tyldesley. Sacred Heart closed in 2004, and its parish together with St Richard's in Mayfield Street which opened in 1928, Holy Family in Boothstown, St Ambrose Barlow in Astley, St Gabriel's, Higher Folds in Leigh were united as a single community with St Margaret Clitherow as its patron.

== Sport ==
Swimming baths opened in Mayfield Street in 1902 and a swimming club was formed. The baths closed in 2005 and the Atherton & Leigh Amateur Swimming Club moved to the new Leigh Sports Village facility in 2008.

Atherton has two semi-pro football teams, the oldest of which is Atherton Collieries A.F.C., formed in 1916, who play in the Northern Premier League. Others are Atherton Laburnum Rovers F.C., members of the North West Counties Football League and Atherton Town FC.

Atherton Cricket Club was formed in 1872 and has played in the Bolton and District Cricket Association since 1921.

== Public services ==
Atherton is policed by the Greater Manchester Police force from Atherton Police Station, which covers Atherton, Tyldesley, Astley and Mosley Common, and is one of 5 subdivisions within the Wigan division. It is part of the L division, which covers the entirety of Wigan borough. The statutory emergency fire and rescue service is provided by the Greater Manchester Fire and Rescue Service, from Atherton fire station.

Health services in the Wigan borough are provided by the Wigan Borough Clinical Commissioning Group. Hospital services are provided by the Wrightington, Wigan and Leigh NHS Foundation Trust who provide an Accident and Emergency service at Wigan's Royal Albert Edward Infirmary and outpatient clinics at Leigh Infirmary.

Waste management is coordinated by the Wigan Authority, which is a statutory waste disposal authority in its own right. Atherton's Distribution Network Operator for electricity is Electricity North West Ltd. United Utilities manages Atherton's drinking and wastewater.

== Culture ==
Atherton Botanical Garden Club, which is today a social club, was formed in 1850 and organised lectures, study groups and rambles on Chat Moss for its members. A public library was opened in 1905 with an Andrew Carnegie grant. Bent Chapel already had a library in the Chowbent School and donated 4,000 books to the new town library. Central Park, a 10-acre (4.0 ha) public park, was created in 1912. Other parks were later provided in Lodge Lane, Hindsford and Devonshire Place. The urban district council also acquired the grounds belonging to Howe Bridge Welfare in 1963. In the early and mid-20th century Atherton had three cinemas, the Gem in Bullough Street, the Savoy and the Palace on Market Street. An amateur photographic society was formed in 1938. Formby Hall, demolished in 2018, used to host the Bent 'n' Bongs Beer Festival over the last weekend of every January.

== Notable residents ==
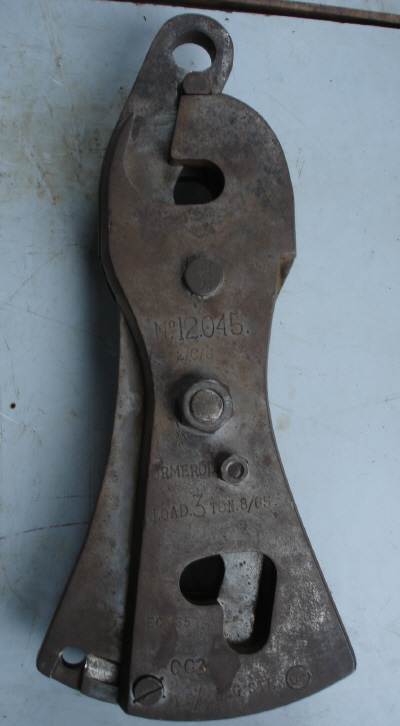
Ormerod Link

- James Wood (1672–1759), minister of Chowbent Chapel known as "General", fought at the Battle of Preston.
- Edward Rigby (1747–1821), an English physician, writer and local politician.
- Joseph Nightingale (1775–1824), born in Chowbent, a prolific English writer and preacher, became a Unitarian.
- Thomas Walker Horsfield (1792–1837) historian and topographer.
- Edward Ormerod (1834–1894), a mining engineer at Gibfield Colliery, invented the Ormerod detaching hook.
- Arthur John Hope (1875–1960), architect, partner in Bradshaw Gass & Hope, born and lived locally.
- Meredith Gwynne Evans (1904–1952), physical chemist, one of the co-founders of the transition state theory.
- Eric Laithwaite (1921–1997) electrical engineer, known as the "Father of Maglev" for development of the linear induction motor and maglev rail system .
- Geoffrey Shovelton (1936–2016), singer, actor and illustrator, sang tenor roles with the D'Oyly Carte Opera
- Julie Hilling (born 1955), politician, MP for Bolton West from 2010 to 2015.
- Lemn Sissay (born 1967), a British author and broadcaster grew up and lived locally.
- Andy Whyment (born 1981), actor, plays Kirk Sutherland on Coronation Street, lives locally.
- Laura White (born 1987), Grammy-nominated recording artist and songwriter.

=== Sport ===
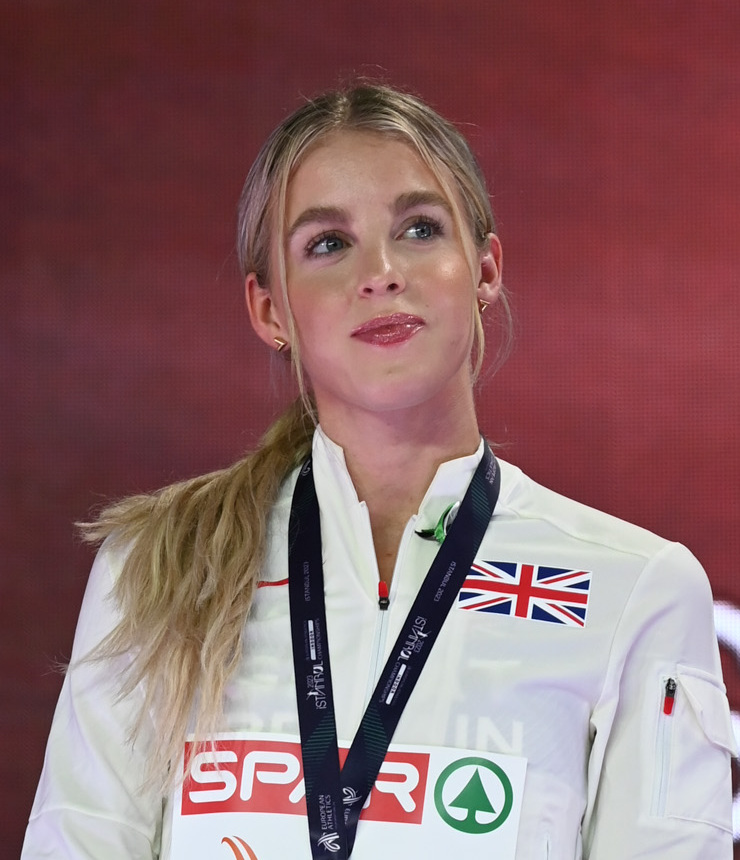
Keely Hodgkinson, 2023

- Bob Haworth (1897–1962), footballer who played 322 games for Bolton Wanderers
- Billy Butler (1900–1966), footballer who played 407 games for Bolton Wanderers
- Tommy Butler (1918–2009), footballer who played 370 games including 218 for Accrington Stanley
- Colin Hilton (1937–2015), cricketer, played 115 First-class cricket matches
- Ken Roberts (1937–2017), rugby union and rugby league footballer who played 441 games
- Keith Stott (1944–2012), footballer who played 330 games, including 188 for Crewe Alexandra & 142 for Chesterfield
- Nigel Short (born 1965), chess grandmaster, grew up in Atherton and attended St Philip's School.
- Karl Brown (born 1988), cricketer, has played 85 First-class cricket matches
- Tom Aspinall (born 1993), mixed martial artist, the UFC Heavyweight Champion, raised locally.
- Keely Hodgkinson (born 2002), middle-distance runner, won gold at the 800m at 2024 Summer Olympics, raised locally.

== See also ==
- Listed buildings in Atherton, Greater Manchester
- List of people from Wigan
- List of mills in Wigan
- List of mining disasters in Lancashire

== Bibliography ==
- Bond; Ackers; Ward (1979), Leigh Homesteads, Leigh Local History Society Publication No7
- Holcroft, Fred (1998), Silk Manufacturing in Leigh, Leigh Local History Society Publication No21
- Lunn, John (1971), Atherton Lancashire, A manorial social and industrial history, Atherton UDC
- Mills, A. D. (1998), Dictionary of English Place-Names, Oxford, ISBN 0-19-280074-4 (subscription required)
- Pollard, Richard; Pevsner, Nikolaus; Sharples, Joseph (2006), Lancashire: Liverpool and the South West, Yale University Press, ISBN 978-0-300-10910-8}
- Sweeney, D. J. (1996), A Lancashire Triangle Part One, Triangle Publishing, ISBN 0-9529333-0-6
- Sweeney, D. J. (1997), A Lancashire Triangle Part Two, Triangle Publishing, ISBN 0-9529333-2-2
- Wright, J. J. (1921), The Story of Chowbent Chapel, Chowbent Chapel
