= Hindsford =

Suburb of Atherton, Greater Manchester, England

Coordinates: 53.5173°N 2.4785°W

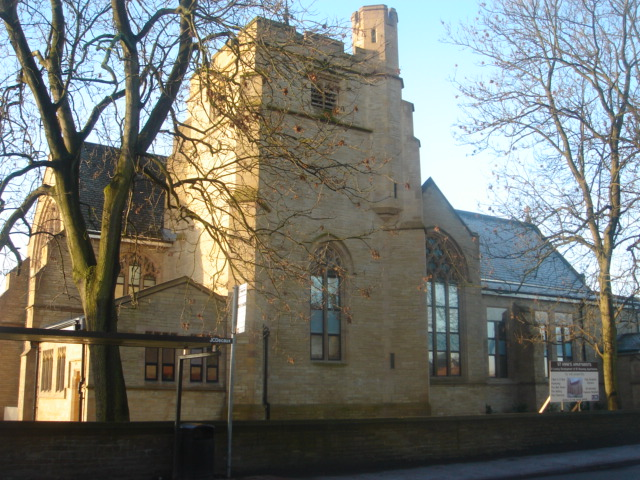
- St Anne's Church

- Location within Greater Manchester
- OS grid reference: SD683023
  - London: 170 mi (274 km) SE
- Metropolitan borough: Wigan
- Metropolitan county: Greater Manchester
- Region: North West
- Country: England
- Sovereign state: United Kingdom
- Post town: MANCHESTER
- Postcode district: M46
- Dialling code: 01942
- Police: Greater Manchester
- Fire: Greater Manchester
- Ambulance: North West
- UK Parliament: Leigh

Hindsford is a suburb of Atherton in the Metropolitan Borough of Wigan, Greater Manchester, England. It is situated to the west of the Hindsford Brook, an ancient boundary between the townships of Atherton and Tyldesley cum Shakerley, and east of the Chanters Brook in the ancient parish of Leigh.

== History ==
Historically in Lancashire, Hindsford developed in the middle of the 19th century when large cotton mills were built on both sides of the Hindsford Brook in Hindsford and Tyldesley by James Burton and Sons. Rows of terraced housing were built for the influx of workers, many from Ireland. Field Mill, Lodge Mill and Westfield Mill were on the Hindsford bank. Lodge Mill and Westfield Mill closed in the 1920s but the site of Atherton Mill was used by Ward and Goldstone who made electrical items.

The Fletchers owned a coal mine at Chanters Colliery from the 1850s but coal had been mined in that area for centuries. The company became Fletcher, Burrows and Company in 1874 and in 1875 the company who owned Atherton Collieries employed a Dutch architect to design cottages for the workers in the coal mines. The colliery had access to a dozen seams including the Arley mine at 1,832 feet, it closed in 1966. There was a brickworks at Swan Island.

== Religion ==
Many Roman Catholics from Ireland came to work in the mills and collieries of Atherton and Tyldesley. One was John Holland of the Tyldesley Coal Company who provided the materials to build Sacred Heart Church on land donated by Lord Lilford. The church was consecrated by Bishop Goss of the Roman Catholic Archdiocese of Liverpool in 1869.

The parish church in Atherton built a mission church at Swan Island in 1873. Hindsford became an independent parish in 1884 and in 1889 the foundation stone for St Anne's Church was laid. The church was completed in 1901 and cost £9,000.

== See also ==
- List of mining disasters in Lancashire
