= Colliers Arms, Aspull =

Listed pub in Greater Manchester, England

Colliers Arms
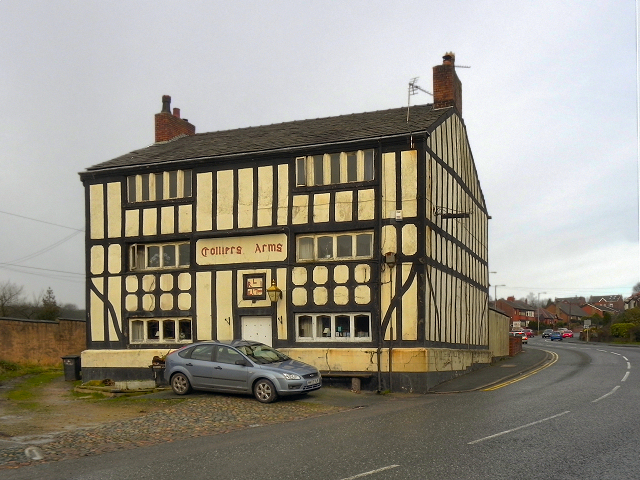
- The pub in 2012

- Location within Greater Manchester
- Alternative names: The Stone

General information
- Type: Public house
- Location: 192 Wigan Road, Aspull, Greater Manchester, England
- Coordinates: 53.5725°N 2.6405°W
- Year built: 1700; 326 years ago
- Renovated: 2023 (refurbished)

Design and construction
- Designations

Listed Building – Grade II
- Official name: Colliers Arms public house
- Designated: 9 June 1966
- Reference no.: 1356275

The Colliers Arms is a Grade II listed public house on Wigan Road in Aspull, a village within the Metropolitan Borough of Wigan, Greater Manchester, England. Built in 1700, a date also recorded on a datestone, it reopened in November 2023 after refurbishment work. The pub is known locally as "The Stone", although the point at which this name came into use is not recorded. It stands near the Leeds and Liverpool Canal, with Haigh Country Park a short distance away.

== History ==
The building was constructed in 1700, according to its official listing, a date that also appears on a datestone inscribed "RLI/IL 1700". The 1909 Ordnance Survey map marks the building without a designation or name, while the 1929 edition shows it as a public house. The name "Colliers Arms" is consistent with historic coal-mining in Aspull, but available sources do not record how or when the name was adopted.

On 9 June 1966, the Colliers Arms was designated a Grade II listed building. In November 2023, the pub reopened following a full refurbishment. It is known locally as "The Stone", although the point at which this name came into use is not recorded. The Colliers Arms stands near the Leeds and Liverpool Canal, and Haigh Country Park is only a short distance away.

== Architecture ==
=== Exterior ===
The building has a plastered exterior with decorative timbering, likely over stone, and brick chimneys with a slate roof. It has three storeys and two bays. The ground floor has a solid base up to the window line. The ground and first floors have modern four‑pane casement windows, and the top floor has five‑pane windows of an older pattern. The main doorway is in the centre, with a datestone above it. On the left side, some of the plaster has come away, exposing stonework and former window openings that have been filled in. There are chimneys on the gable ends. At the back, there is a sash window lighting the staircase and older five‑pane windows on the first floor.

=== Interior ===
Inside, the ground and first floors have moulded beams. The staircase has a closed string, a shaped frieze, twisted balusters—some now boxed in—and a moulded handrail. A first‑floor room contains a fireplace with pilasters, a panel above, and a dentilled cornice; cupboards may once have stood to either side but are now concealed. Some doors have two raised panels with decorative mouldings and strap hinges.

== See also ==
- Listed buildings in Aspull
- Listed pubs in Greater Manchester
