= Aspull =

Village in Greater Manchester, England

Coordinates: 53.570°N 2.586°W

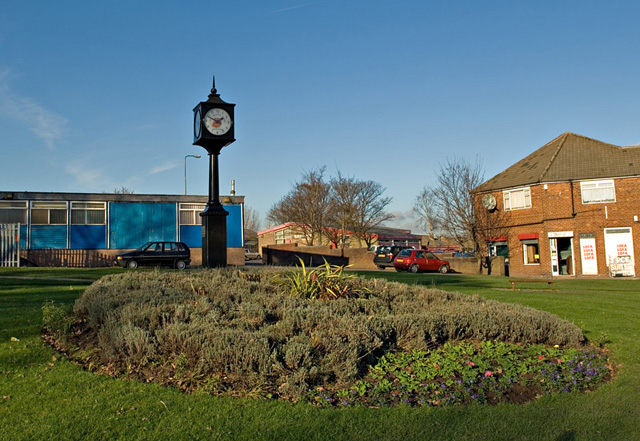
- Aspull Clock

- Location within Greater Manchester
- Population: 4,977
- OS grid reference: SD611082
- Metropolitan borough: Wigan
- Metropolitan county: Greater Manchester
- Region: North West
- Country: England
- Sovereign state: United Kingdom
- Post town: WIGAN
- Postcode district: WN2
- Dialling code: 01942
- Police: Greater Manchester
- Fire: Greater Manchester
- Ambulance: North West
- UK Parliament: Wigan

Aspull is a village in the Metropolitan Borough of Wigan, in Greater Manchester, England. Historically in Lancashire, Aspull, along with Haigh, is surrounded by greenbelt and agricultural land, separated from Westhoughton, on its southeast side, by a brook running through Borsdane Wood. The ground rises from south to north, reaching 400 feet (122 m), and has views towards Winter Hill and the West Pennine Moors. It has a population of 4,977.

Aspull was once a centre of mining and textile manufacture, though little evidence of this can be seen in the village today. Haigh Country Park estate lies to the west.

== History ==
=== Early history ===
The earliest notice of Aspull is that contained in the survey of 1212, when, as one plough-land, it formed part of the Childwall fee held by Richard son of Robert de Lathom, under the lord of Manchester. The fee was a composite one of 6½ plough-lands (of which Aspull formed one), held chiefly by Richard de Lathom, and partly by Roger de Samlesbury and Alexander de Harwood.

In 1302 Richard de Ince, as son and heir of Henry de Sefton, and Adam de Hindley, were found to hold Aspull, as the eighth part of a knight's fee, directly of Thomas Grelley. From this time the lordship has been held with the adjacent Ince by the families of Ince and Gerard in succession; until Aspull was sold to the Earl of Crawford and Balcarres, lord of Haigh.

Hindley Hall, in Aspull, the residence of the Hindleys, became the property of James, a younger son of Robert Dukinfield of Cheshire. In the 18th century it was acquired by the Leighs of Whitley Hall, Wigan, and Sir Robert Holt Leigh lived here till his death in 1843. His estates then passed for life to his cousin Thomas Pemberton, who took the name of Leigh, and made Hindley Hall his residence; he was raised to the peerage as Baron Kingsdown in 1858.

The hearth tax roll of 1666 shows that 135 hearths were charged. The most considerable houses were those of Richard Green, nine hearths; Peter Orrell and James Dukinfield, eight each; Major Rigby and Thomas Molyneux, seven each; and Edward Gleast, six.

St. Elizabeth's C of E Church was built in 1882 by Roger Leigh. The patronage is vested in trustees. There are two Methodist chapels. In 1858 the Roman Catholic church of Our Lady of the Immaculate Conception was erected.

=== Coal ===
Cannel coal was found in Aspull. There were several large collieries dating back to the 18th century, also malt kilns and a cotton mill. In 1896 the Crawford, Kirkless, Moor and Woodshaw Pits in the township belonging the Wigan Coal and Iron Company employed over 1,000 workers. Aspull's long history of mining left a legacy of old mineshafts, water drainage tunnels (soughs) and abandoned mine workings.

The Great Haigh Sough in Haigh Country Park discharged iron rich minewater into the Yellow Brook discolouring the brook and River Douglas downstream with ochre deposits. In 2004 the Coal Authority provided a passive treatment plant in a scheme costing £750,000. Work was undertaken by Ascot Environmental who built a pumping station, pipelines, settlement lagoons, reedbeds and landscaped the site. The scheme has improved the water quality removing the discolouration and allowed fish to populate the brook.

The coal-mining tradition lives on in the name of the Colliers Arms pub on Wigan Road, which carries a datestone of 1700 .

== Geography ==
Aspull is on a crossroads. The principal road is to the north-east/south-west, Blackrod to Wigan. Another road runs north-west/south-east, Standish to the A6 road. The Leeds and Liverpool Canal passes through the western corner of the township. Aspull Moor lies in the northern half of the village.

The nearest railway station is at Hindley although Blackrod is only a few yards further distant. Hindley has the more frequent service, whilst Blackrod has the faster service to Manchester. Whilst having colliery (goods) railways Aspull has never had a central railway station of its own. There was, however, on the line from Wigan to Chorley (via Hindley), a station named Dicconson Lane & Aspull some distance from Aspull; that was closed in 1956, before closure of the entire line to passengers in 1960 and to goods in 1966.

== Sport ==
Aspull juniors football club with over 20 teams and 300 children playing from the village, Also has a superb girls section. The town's rugby union club, Aspull RFC, currently fields 3 senior teams. The 1stXV plays in the Counties 1 ADM Lancashire & Cheshire, the 2nd XV plays in the Group 1 of the ADM Combination league and the 3rd XV play in NOWIRUL Simply Lifetime Mortgages Division 3 Central of Halbro NW Leagues.

The town is home to the Aspull Olympic Wrestling Club, known internationally as "The Snake Pit", one of the last gyms to teach authentic catch wrestling. It hosts the Snake Pit World Championships and other competitions for catch wrestling.

== Notable people ==
- William Pickard (1821–1887), a British trade unionist, active in the Wigan District Miners' Union
- Jim Sharrock (1882–1945), an English professional rugby league footballer who played 275 games for Wigan Warriors
- Frank Randle (1901–1957), an English comedian.

== See also ==
- Listed buildings in Aspull
