= Bradshaigh =

Bradshaigh is a surname. Notable people with the surname include:

- Bradshaigh baronets
- Roger Bradshaigh (disambiguation), multiple people
- William de Bradshaigh (fl. 1313–1331), English politician
