= Kirkless Hall and Farmhouse =

Listed building in Aspull, Greater Manchester, England

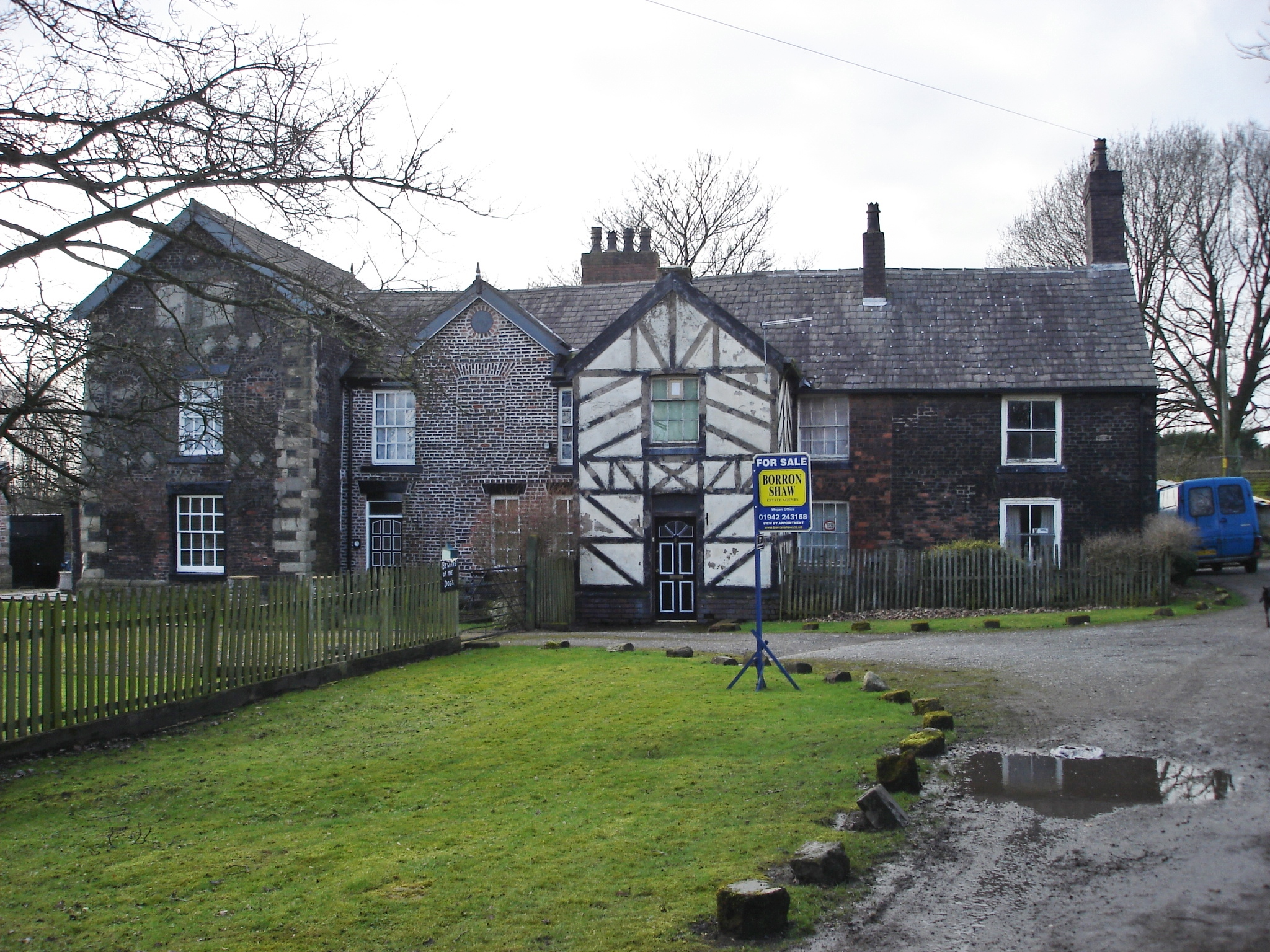
- Kirkless Hall and Farmhouse in 2014

- Location within Greater Manchester

General information
- Architectural style: Vernacular
- Location: Farm Lane, Aspull, Greater Manchester, England
- Coordinates: 53.5524°N 2.6000°W
- Year built: 17th century

Listed Building – Grade II*
- Official name: Kirkless Hall and Kirkless Hall Farmhouse
- Designated: 9 June 1966
- Reference no.: 1068423

Kirkless Hall and Farmhouse (officially listed as Kirkless Hall and Kirkless Hall Farmhouse) are adjoining historic buildings on Farm Lane in Aspull, a village within the Metropolitan Borough of Wigan, Greater Manchester, England. They are jointly recorded in the National Heritage List for England as a Grade II* listed building.

== History ==
The estate is thought to occupy a site of medieval origin, with early maps and archaeological observations indicating the possible presence of a moat and internal cruck frames that may date to the 14th or 15th century. By the 17th century, Kirkless Hall had developed into a substantial brick‑built residence, a form noted in contemporary accounts as less common in Lancashire.

In the early 18th century, the estate was owned by Richard Houghton. After his death, it passed to Thomas Kendrick and subsequently to his son John Kendrick, who initiated coal mining on the property. By 1773 a pumping engine had been installed to support mining operations, indicating the estate's shift toward industrial activity.

During the late 18th and 19th centuries, the estate became closely associated with the development of the South Lancashire Coalfield. In 1845 John Lancaster leased the site and expanded operations, forming the Kirkless Hall Coal & Cannel Company. By 1858 ironworks had been added, and the enterprise became the Kirkless Hall Coal & Iron Company. In 1865 it merged into the Wigan Coal and Iron Company, with Kirkless Hall serving as its headquarters. By this period, the hall was surrounded by industrial infrastructure, including slag heaps and furnaces.

Following the decline of coal and iron industries, Kirkless Hall reverted to residential use. On 9 June 1966, Kirkless Hall and Farmhouse was designated a Grade II* listed building for its architectural and historic significance.

Today, it remains divided into two dwellings, retaining much of its historic character despite alterations. The surrounding landscape, once dominated by industrial activity, is now used for leisure, with the adjacent Leeds and Liverpool Canal serving recreational purposes.

== Architecture ==
The hall and farmhouse, now divided into two dwellings, are constructed primarily of brick with stone dressings and have a slate roof. A datestone reading "BUILT 1663," thought not to be original, suggests a 17th-century phase of construction. The building is two storeys in height with seven bays, the seventh being a later addition.

Architectural features include projecting gabled bays at the first and fifth positions. The first four bays rest on a stone base, and the first bay displays raised brick diapering, a decorative masonry technique. The fifth bay incorporates timber-frame pattern plastering, echoing earlier vernacular forms.

Windows are predominantly sash with glazing bars, although some have been replaced with later single-glazed units. Ground-floor openings have gauged-brick cambered arches and wedge lintels, and there is evidence of multiple blocked openings and altered entrances. Prominent chimney stacks, including cross-axial and gable-end stacks, form part of the building's external composition.

== See also ==
- Grade II* listed buildings in Greater Manchester
- Listed buildings in Aspull
