= St David's Church, Haigh =

Coordinates: 53.5758°N 2.5961°W

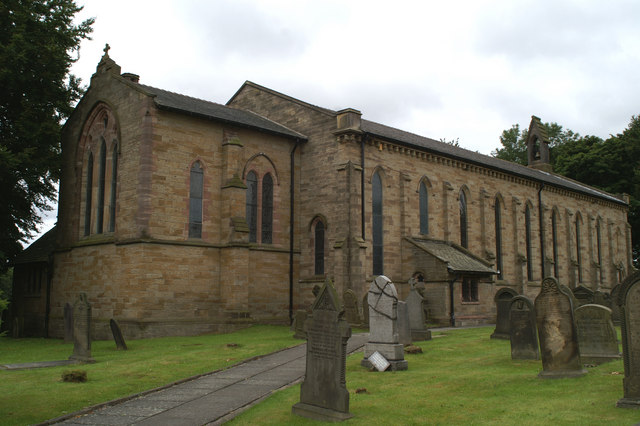
- St David's Church, Haigh, from the northeast

- Location in Greater Manchester
- OS grid reference: SD 606,090
- Location: Copperas Lane, Haigh, Wigan, Greater Manchester
- Country: England
- Denomination: Anglican
- Website: St David, Haigh & Aspull

History
- Status: Parish church
- Dedication: Saint David

Architecture
- Functional status: Active
- Heritage designation: Grade II
- Designated: 22 February 1967
- Architect(s): Thomas Rickman and Henry Hutchinson
- Architectural type: Church
- Style: Gothic Revival
- Groundbreaking: 1830
- Completed: 1886

Specifications
- Materials: Stone, slate roof

Administration
- Province: York
- Diocese: Liverpool
- Archdeaconry: Warrington
- Deanery: Wigan
- Parish: Wigan North East

St David's Church is in Copperas Lane, Haigh, Wigan, Greater Manchester, England. It is an active Anglican parish church in the deanery of Wigan, the archdeaconry of Warrington, and the diocese of Liverpool. The church is recorded in the National Heritage List for England as a designated Grade II listed building. It was a Commissioners' church, having received a grant towards its construction from the Church Building Commission.

== History ==
St David's was built between 1830 and 1833 to a design by Thomas Rickman and Henry Hutchinson. A grant of £3,433 (equivalent to £350,000 in 2025) was given towards its construction by the Church Building Commission. The church was consecrated by the Rt Revd John Bird Sumner, bishop of Chester, on 2 November 1833. It was originally a chapel of ease to Wigan Parish Church, becoming a parish in its own right in 1838. In 1886 the east end of the church was extended by J. Medland Taylor.

== Architecture ==
The church is constructed in stone. The roof is slated and has a ridge of red tiles. Its architectural style is Gothic Revival. The plan consists of a nine-bay nave with a west porch and a north projection, and a lower and narrower two-bay chancel with an organ chamber to the south. The porch is gabled with triple lancet windows and doorways on the north and south sides. Above the porch is a gabled bellcote. The east window has three lights. Along the sides of the church are thin buttresses interspersed with tall lancet windows. Inside the church, the nave has a flat ceiling, and the chancel has a hammerbeam roof. At the west end is a stone gallery, with a baptistry under the south arch. The stained glass includes a window by Heaton, Butler and Bayne.

== External features ==
The lychgate at the entrance to the churchyard, and the adjoining churchyard wall, are listed at Grade II. The lychgate is in stone with a slate roof, and is dated 1909. There are gargoyles at the corners, and a cross on the ridge. The churchyard contains the war graves of three service personnel of World War I, and seven of World War II.

== See also ==
- Listed buildings in Haigh, Greater Manchester
- List of churches in Greater Manchester
- List of Commissioners' churches in Northeast and Northwest England
- List of new churches by Thomas Rickman
