= Haigh Hall Miniature Railway =

Rideable miniature railway in Wigan, Greater Manchester, England

Coordinates: 53.568°N 2.603°W

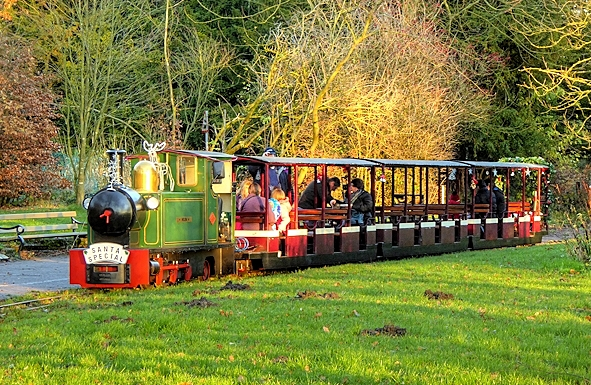
Santa Special on the Miniature Railway

Haigh Hall Miniature Railway (HHMR) is a 15 in (381 mm) gauge miniature railway, situated in the grounds of Haigh Country Park in Haigh, Greater Manchester, England.

The railway officially re-opened on 20 April 2014, but it had run trains under a new operator since late July 2013, running shuttle services between two stations; Haigh Hall North and Haigh Hall South. The full 1 mile (1.6 km) circuit was re-opened in early 2014. The railway first opened in 1986 under different operators; it runs over the same general track layout, but some alterations have been made over time.

HHMR's resident locomotives are Helen and Rachel, they have been a part of the railway for some time.

In December 2022, the Haigh Woodland Railway Association was formed and since that time has been working with a team of volunteers to rebuild much of the track to enable operations to begin in the future. The association has brought in an additional set of coaches which are formerly of the Dudley Zoo railway and windmill farm and these are undergoing minor restoration prior to being made available for service in future, The association members have also Purchased a number of Wagons to assist in the restoration and these are available when required.

In September 2024, Wigan Council announced a restoration package of £380,000 that would enable the railway to return to service and once again take the full route of 1 mile through the upper plantations, once again calling at both stations. It is hoped that alongside the general service a program of special events will highlight the unique heritage of the railway as the last built municipally owned 15 inch gauge railway in the united kingdom.

Locomotive Name	Livery	Wheel Arrangement	Build Date	Builder	Status
Helen	Lined Green	0-6-2	1992	Alan Keef	Stored Pending overhaul
The Cub	Grey	4-0-4	1954	Minirail	Stored Pending Overhaul
6284	lner black	2-8-0	2009	Messrs Crome & Loxley	Operational Passenger Loco Off site

== Sources ==
- Scott, Peter (2015). Track Plans of Minor Railways in the British Isles. Reading, Berkshire: P Scott. ISBN 978-1-902368-43-6. Vol.3 - Northern England.
