= Haigh, Greater Manchester =

Village in Greater Manchester, England

Coordinates: 53.576°N 2.595°W

Haigh
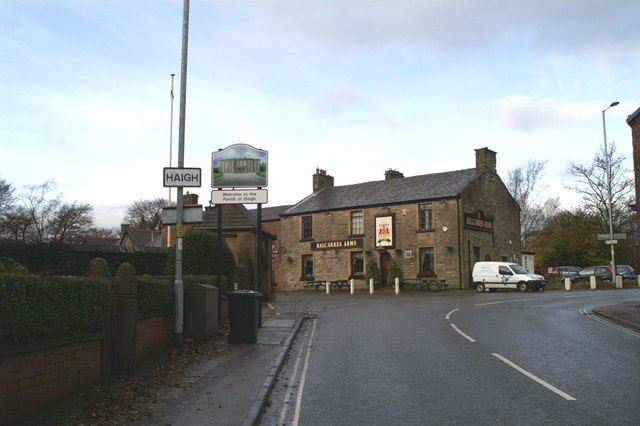
- Haigh village

- Location within Greater Manchester
- Population: 594 (2001)
- OS grid reference: SD605090
- Civil parish: Haigh
- Metropolitan borough: Wigan
- Metropolitan county: Greater Manchester
- Region: North West
- Country: England
- Sovereign state: United Kingdom
- Post town: WIGAN
- Postcode district: WN1 / WN2
- Dialling code: 01257 / 01942
- Police: Greater Manchester
- Fire: Greater Manchester
- Ambulance: North West
- UK Parliament: Wigan

Haigh (/heɪ/) is a village and civil parish in the Metropolitan Borough of Wigan, Greater Manchester, England. Historically part of Lancashire, it is located next to the village of Aspull. The western boundary is the River Douglas, which separates the township from Wigan. To the north, a small brook running into the Douglas divides it from Blackrod. At the 2001 census it had a population of 594.

== History ==
Haigh is derived from the Old English haga, a hedge and means "the enclosure". The township was variously recorded as Hage in 1193, Hagh in 1298, and Haghe, Ha and Haw in the 16th century.

=== Manor ===
Between 1220 and 1230 the manor was part of the Marsey fee. Hugh de Haigh, probably Hugh le Norreys paid 3 marks in 1193–4 for having the king's good will. Richard de Orrell granted land in Haigh to Cockersand Abbey in 1220. In 1282 Hugh le Norreys was lord of Haigh. His daughter Mabel married William Bradshagh and in 1298 they inherited the manors of Haigh and Blackrod from Mabel's father. Bradshagh took part in Adam Banastre's rebellion in 1315 for which he was outlawed and by 1317 his manors were confiscated by the crown and granted to Peter de Limesey. William was presumed dead and Mabel remarried, but he returned in 1324 and killed Mabel's new husband. Sir William was killed at Winwick in August 1333. As penance, a legend states that Mabel walked barefoot from Wigan to Haigh every week for the rest of her life. The legend was made into a novel by Sir Walter Scott, and is remembered by Mab's Cross in Wigan Lane. In 1336 and 1337 Mabel Bradshaigh arranged for the succession of the manors to her husband's nephews; Haigh to William, son of John de Bradshagh, and Blackrod to Roger, son of Richard. In 1338 she founded a chantry in Wigan Church. She held the manor until 1346. She is honoured in the naming of Lady Mabel's Wood, a Woodland Trust wood at Haigh Hall country park, previously farmland owned by the Marshall family.

Early in 1365 Roger de Bradshagh of Westleigh claimed the manor from William de Bradshagh and Sir Henry de Trafford. Thomas de Bradshagh took part in the Rising of the North of 1403 and was present at the Battle of Shrewsbury and was later pardoned by Henry IV. Edward Bradshaigh (d. 1652), a Carmelite friar – known as Elias à Jesu – was the fourth son of Roger Bradshaigh. Three brothers were Jesuits, and one brother a secular priest. Sir Roger Bradshaigh MP, was created a baronet in 1679 (see Bradshaigh baronets). Sir Roger Bradshaigh, the third Baronet, MP for Wigan for over 50 years, was Father of the House in the House of Commons from 1738 to 1747. Over time the name has been variously recorded as Bradshagh, Bradshaghe and Bradshaw. The Bradshaigh variant dates from about 1518.

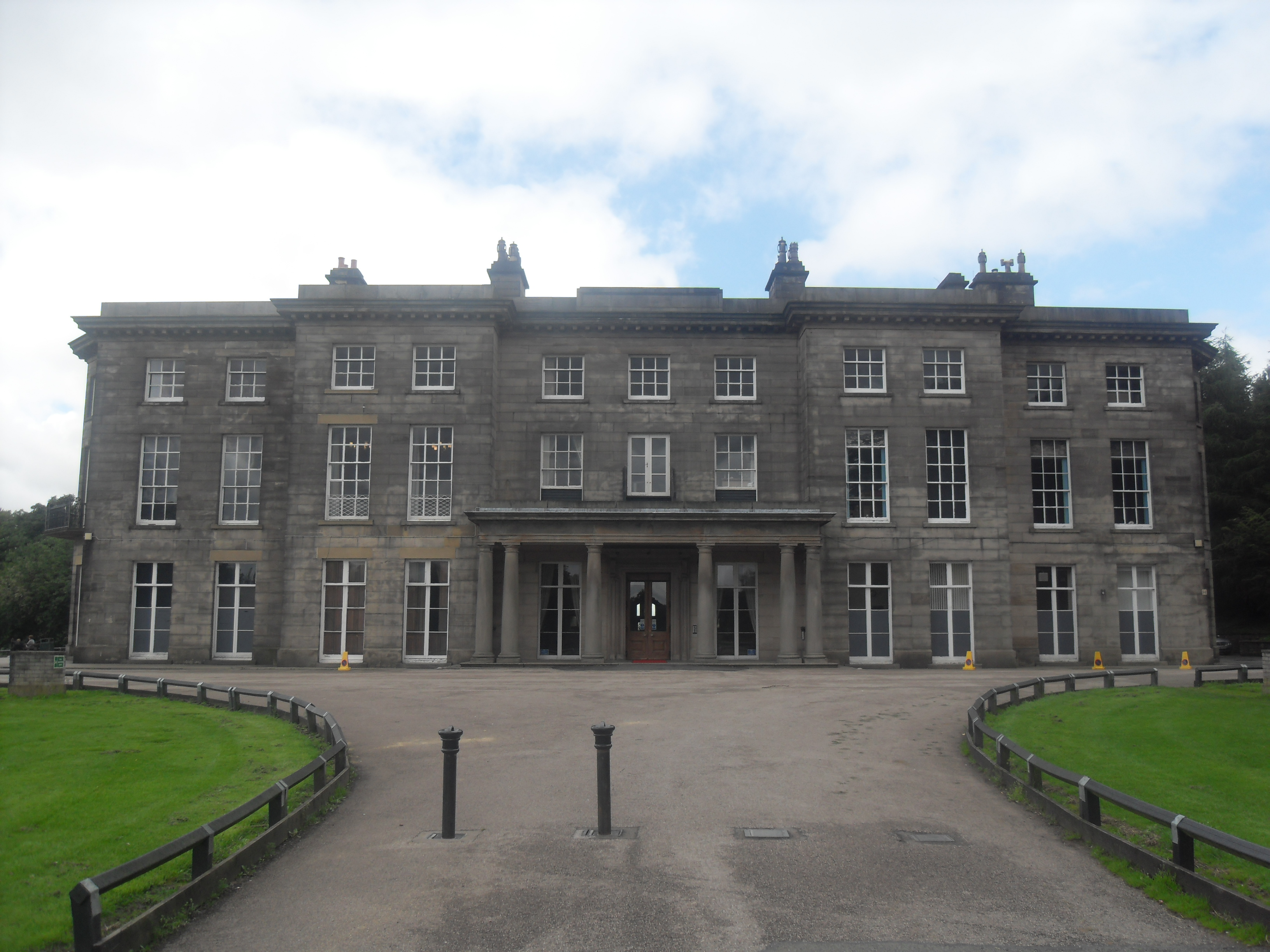
Haigh Hall

On 1 June 1780 Elizabeth Dalrymple, great niece of the fourth Baronet and heiress of Haigh as a result of the failure of the male line in her maternal family (Bradshaigh), married Alexander Lindsay, 6th Earl of Balcarres. In 1787 the Earls of Crawford (after 1848, the Earls of Crawford and Balcarres) moved their seat to Haigh Hall for several generations. A manor house had stood on the Haigh estate since the Middle Ages. The present hall was built between 1827 and 1840 on the site of the ancient manor house, by Alexander's son the 7th Earl Balcarres who designed and supervised its construction whilst living in a cottage in the grounds. James, the 9th Earl, a bibliophile, established an extensive library at the hall. David, the 11th Earl sold the hall and grounds to Wigan Corporation in 1947 for £18,000 and moved back to the family's original home in Balcarres.

=== Coal ===
In 1540 John Leland reported that Sir Roger Bradshaigh had discovered a seam of cannel coal on his estate which could be burnt or carved by hand or machine into ornaments. It was an excellent fuel, easily lit, burned with a bright flame and left virtually no ash. It was widely used for domestic lighting in the early 19th century before the incandescent gas mantle was available but lost favour when coal gas made it obsolete. The cannel coal was mined from Tudor times but by the mid-1600s the mines were wet and started flooding. To remedy this, between 1653 and 1670, Sir Roger Bradshaw built a sough or adit, the Great Haigh Sough which ran for about a mile under his estate. It still drains water from the ancient workings. The Bradshaws successors, the Earls of Crawford and Balcarres, founded the Wigan Coal and Iron Company in 1865. Collieries in Haigh belonging the Wigan Coal and Iron Company in 1896 were the Alexandra, Bawkhouse, Bridge, Lindsay and Meadow Pits.

The central workshops for Balcarres' collieries in Haigh and Aspull were built on the north bank of the canal between 1839 and 1841. The forge, smithy, joinery and fitting shops were powered by a steam engine. The site became the sawmill for the Wigan Coal and Iron Company's pits and Kirkless Iron and Steel Works. The Georgian office block survives.

=== Haigh Foundry ===
Haigh Foundry was opened in the steep-sided Douglas valley in 1788 by the 6th earl, his brother and Mr Corbett an iron founder from Wigan. It was an iron works producing pig iron and castings. Brock Mill Forge, of even earlier origins, was acquired. From 1808, the firm manufactured winding engines and pumps for the mining industry. In 1812, it built Lancashire's first locomotive and two more by 1816. In 1835 E. Evans and T.C. Ryley took a 21-year lease. They built 0-4-0 and 2-2-0 locomotives, subcontracted from Edward Bury. In 1837, Ajax was supplied to the Leicester and Swannington Railway, followed by Hector, an 0-6-0. In 1838 two broad gauge locomotives were built for the Great Western Railway. Four saddle tank locomotives designed by Daniel Gooch were built for the South Devon Railway. Long boiler locomotives were built for Jones and Potts and three locomotives were built for T.R.Crampton. In 1855 two 0-8-0 locomotives were built for use in the Crimean War, hauling guns up inclines as steep as 1 in 10. Over 100 locomotives were built before the lease expired in 1856.

In 1848, Haigh produced a beam engine of 100 inch bore by 12 feet stroke, possibly the largest in the world at that time. During the same decade, it supplied massive swing bridges for Albert Dock, Liverpool and Hull Docks – both extant in 2011. A new lease was signed by Birley & Thompson who concentrated on mining machinery, mill engines and large iron fabrications. Until 1860, castings had to be carted up the hill out of the valley and records exist of at least 48 horses being hired from farmers to move a single casting. A railway was built but was re-routed a few years later. The foundry lease was given up in 1884 and the works closed in 1885. Several of Haigh's engineers left to form engine building companies – Walker Brothers, Ince Forge and Worsley Mesnes Ironworks Ltd.

Much of the site, with the exception of Brock Mill Forge, was intact in 2011 and the route of the mineral railway, including four bridges, is little changed. The foundry has been demolished but the site is used for manufacturing. The cast iron gateposts remain and a four-storey building and chimney by the River Douglas. The foundry drawing office was on Wingates Road in a building with large windows and a stone floor supported by cast iron columns.

== Governance ==
Lying within the historic county boundaries of Lancashire since the early 12th century, Haigh was a township in the ecclesiastical parish of Wigan in the Hundred of West Derby. It was part of the Wigan Poor Law Union which after 1837 took responsibility for the administration and funding of the Poor Law in that area. Haigh was part of the Wigan Rural Sanitary District until 1894 and Wigan Rural District from 1894 until 1974.

== Geography ==
Haigh's western boundary is the River Douglas and a small brook, a tributary of the Douglas, divides it from Blackrod in the north. The township which covers 2198 acres is on ground that rises towards the east and north. The village, about 2 1/2 miles northeast of Wigan, is near the Aspull boundary at about 520 ft (160 m) above sea level. Haigh Hall Country Park occupies 250 acres of woods and parkland on south-western slopes. To the east are Winter Hill and the West Pennine Moors.

Roads lead north to Blackrod, west to Standish, and south to Wigan and Aspull. The Lancaster Canal portion of the Leeds and Liverpool Canal crosses the western part of the township near the River Douglas. Haigh's underlying rocks are the sandstones, shales and ironstones of the Middle Coal Measures of the Lancashire Coalfield and coal and cannel were extensively mined. The Great Haigh Fault throws the Cannel and King Coal seams close to the surface at Haigh and deeper seams outcropped east of the fault within Haigh Hall Estate. The deepest seam of the Middle Coal Measures, the Arley outcrops a quarter mile north of the estate boundary, Arley Brook.

== Demography ==
According to the United Kingdom Census 2001, the civil parish of Haigh had a population of 594.

== Landmarks ==
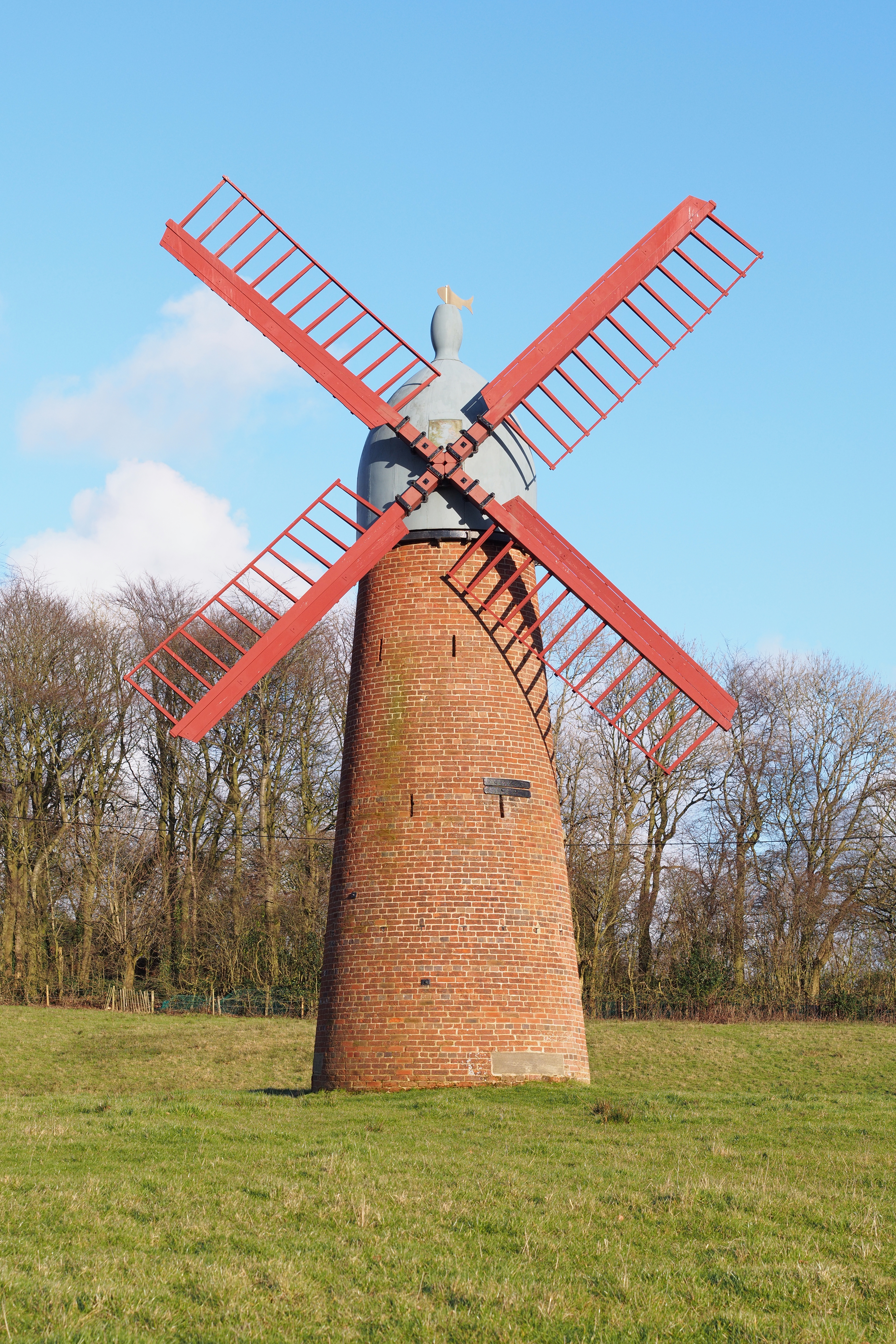
Haigh Windmill after restoration in 2011

Haigh Windmill, the only remaining windmill in Greater Manchester, was built in 1845 and supplied well water to John Sumner & Company's Haigh Brewery which, until the 1950s, was situated behind the Balcarres Arms public house. The disused windmill was restored in 2011 in a £60,000 scheme made possible by Heritage Lottery Funding. The damaged brickwork was repaired and a broken and missing sail replaced.

== Transport ==
Henry Eastman was the engineer for part of the Lancaster Canal to Haigh which was completed in 1799. This is the section where the canal joined the western arm of the Leeds and Liverpool Canal near Wigan Top Lock. In 1810 the Leeds and Liverpool Canal Company was allowed to use the Lancaster Canal south of Johnson's Hillock and the two joined in 1816. The canal passed through the Haigh estate and a Packet House for goods, mail and passengers was built near the Wigan Road entrance.

The Springs Branch Railway which ran from Ince Moss to Haigh and Aspull opened in 1838. There was a station at Red Rock which opened in 1869 on the Lancashire Union Railway. A waiting room was maintained for the occupants of Haigh Hall from 1870 until they left in 1946. The station was closed in 1949.

== Religion ==
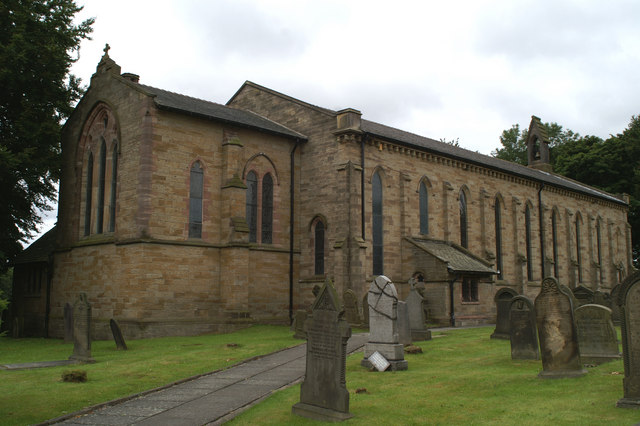
St David's Church

St David's Church is a Commissioners' church built as a chapel of ease to Wigan All Saints. The architect was Thomas Rickman and it was consecrated in 1833. In 1838 the parish of Haigh and Aspull was formed. The Roman Catholic Church of Our Lady of the Immaculate Conception was founded as a mission in 1853 and the church opened in 1858.

== See also ==
- Listed buildings in Haigh, Greater Manchester
