= Roger Bradshaigh =

Roger Bradshaigh may refer to:

- Sir Roger Bradshaigh, 1st Baronet (1628–1684), MP for Lancashire
- Sir Roger Bradshaigh, 2nd Baronet (1649–1687), MP for Wigan
- Sir Roger Bradshaigh, 3rd Baronet (1675–1747), MP for Wigan Father of the House
