= Sir Roger Bradshaigh, 3rd Baronet =

English landowner and Tory politician

Sir Robert Bradshaigh, 3rd Baronet (1675–1747), of Haigh Hall near Wigan, was an English landowner and Tory politician who sat in the English House of Commons and British House of Commons for 52 years from 1695 to 1747.

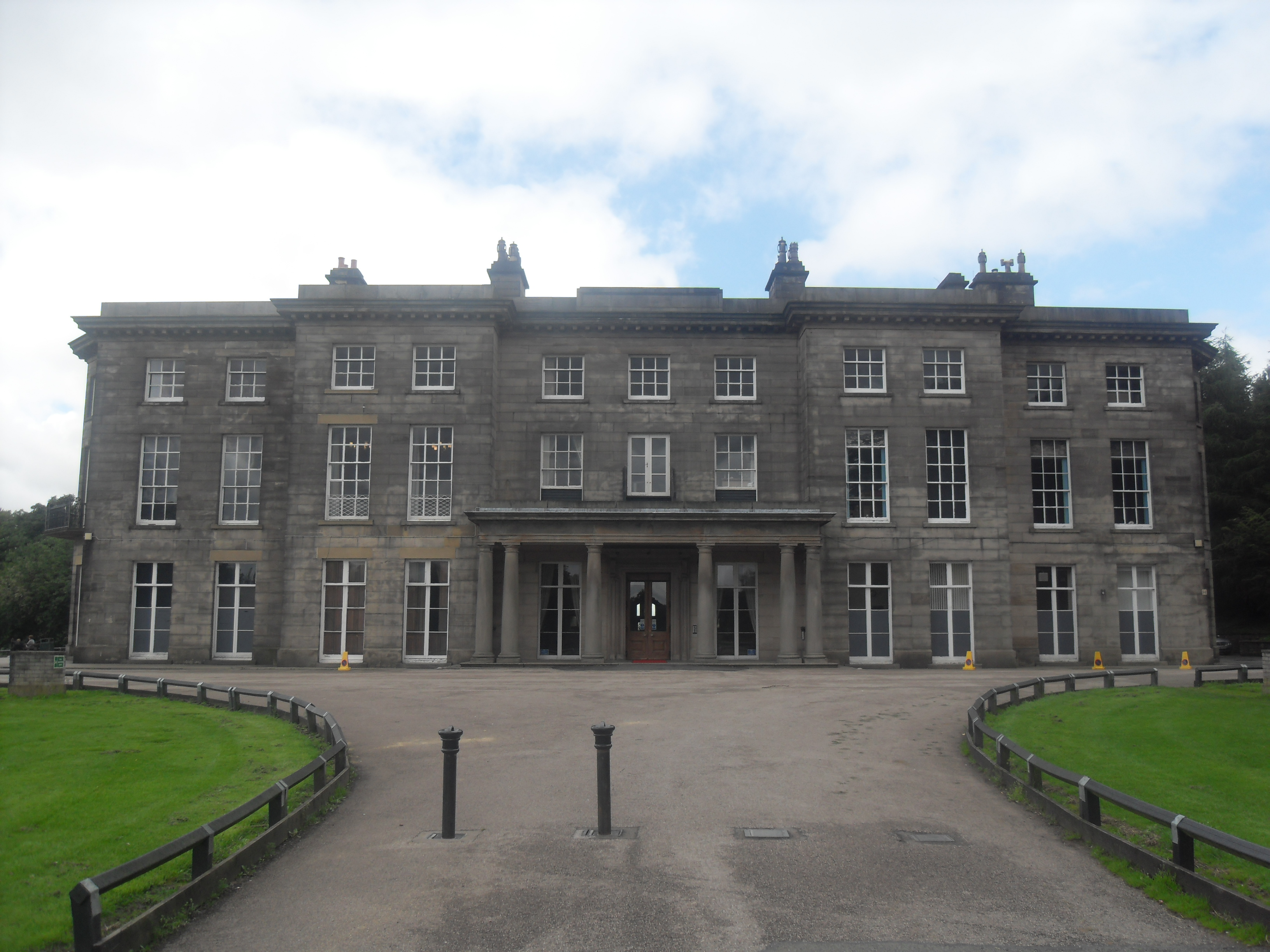
Haigh Hall as rebuilt in 1840

Bradshaigh was the eldest son of Sir Roger Bradshaigh, 2nd Baronet, of Haigh, and his wife Mary Murray, daughter of Henry Murray of Berkhamsted, Hertfordshire, and was baptized on 29 April 1675. He was educated privately under Mr Francis and at Ruthin School. He succeeded his father to Haigh Hall and the baronetcy on 17 June 1687.

Bradshaigh was returned as Member of Parliament for Wigan at the 1695 general election. He sat until 1747 and was Father of the House of Commons from 1738 to 1747.

He was Mayor of Wigan for 1698, 1703, 1719, 1724 and 1729.

He married, in 1697, Rachel, the daughter of Sir John Guise, 2nd Baronet, of Elmore, Gloucestershire, and had four sons and two daughters. In 1742 he handed over Haigh Hall to his eldest son, Sir Roger Bradshaigh, 4th Baronet, and died in 1747.

Parliament of England
Preceded by John Byrom; Peter Shakerley	Member of Parliament for Wigan; 1695–1707; With: Peter Shakerley 1695–1698; Orlando Bridgeman 1698–1701, 1702–1705; Sir Alexander Rigby 1701; Brigadier Emanuel Howe 1705–1707	Succeeded by Parliament of Great Britain
Parliament of Great Britain
Preceded by Parliament of England	Member of Parliament for Wigan; 1707–1747; With: Brigadier Emanuel Howe 1707–1708; Major Henry Bradshaigh 1708–1713; George Kenyon 1713–1715; The Earl of Barrymore 1715–1727, 1734–1747; Peter Bold 1727–1734	Succeeded by Richard Clayton; The Earl of Barrymore
Preceded by Sir Charles Turner, 1st Baronet, of Warham	Father of the House; 1738–1747	Succeeded by Edward Ashe
Baronetage of England
Preceded by Sir Roger Bradshaigh, 2nd Baronet	Baronet of Haigh; 1687–1747	Succeeded by Sir Roger Bradshaigh, 4th Baronet
