= Great Haigh Sough =

Overview
- Location: Under the Haigh Hall estate in Haigh, Greater Manchester, England
- Coordinates: 53.559088°N 2.617436°W
- Status: Abandoned
- System: drainage tunnel
- Start: 1653
- End: 1670

Operation
- Opened: 1670 to present day
- Owner: Coal Authority

Technical
- Length: 1,120 yards (1,020 m) long
- Tunnel clearance: 4 feet (1.2 m) high

The Great Haigh Sough is a tunnel or adit driven under Sir Roger Bradshaigh's estate between 1653 and 1670, to drain his coal and cannel pits in Haigh on the Lancashire Coalfield. The sough's portal and two metres of tunnel from where it discharges water into the Yellow Brook at Bottling Wood is a scheduled monument.

== History ==
Cannel coal had been dug from bell pits on Bradshaigh's estate since the 14th century where the seam was very close to the surface near the Old School Cottages. The sough was driven to drain the pits, which produced both coal and cannel and extended the life of their shallow workings, which were prone to flooding. The sough, a major investment, was considered preferable to winding water from the workings by the primitive methods available at the time. Bradshaigh recorded a detailed survey of the construction of the sough and its shafts with instructions for maintenance so that, "the benefit of my 16 years labour, charge and patience (which it pleased God to crown with success for me and my posterity) may not be lost by neglect."

== Sough ==
The 1,120 yards (1,020 m) long tunnel, up to six feet wide and four feet high, had ten ventilation shafts each up to 3 yards (2.7 m) wide and up to 49 yards (45 m) deep. Driven from Bottling Wood to Park Pit, work started in 1653 and finished in 1670. The miners used picks, hammers, wedges and spades and would have encountered blackdamp which would have extinguished their candles warning them of its presence. The sough was completed without using explosives but it is possible that fires were lit against the rock at the end of a shift to help break it. The shafts were used to remove rock as the miners cut the tunnel. Progress averaged 66 yards (60 m) per year or about 4 feet (1.2 m) a week. Between its outlet and Park Pit the sough passed through several layers of hard sandstones, mudstones and the Cannel and King Coal seams. Seven ventilation shafts, roughly aligned with the main drive to Haigh Hall, were worked as small collieries and the rest filled in. The first shaft from the outfall, Cannel Hollows Pit, was 23 feet (7.0 m) deep. The fifth shaft, Sandy Beds Pit, was sunk 30 yards (27 m) to the sough and met the coal seam at 14 yards (13 m). Its shaft was rectangular in section but the others were round. The last shaft before Park Pit was 48 yards (44 m) deep to the sough and met the Cannel seam at 32 yards (29 m). The shaft at Park Pit was 46 yards (42 m) to the sough and met the King Coal seam at 41 yards (37 m).

In the 18th century the sough was extended and other levels were driven to connect new pits as they became operational. Some pits had their own soughs. The sough was extended to Fothershaw Pit in about 1856 and, by the Wigan Coal and Iron Company, to Aspull Pumping Pit after 1866 extending its length to 4,600 yards (4,200 m).

Such was the importance of the sough that in 1687, the estate bailiff, Thomas Winstanley, ordered its inspection and cleaning from bottom to top at least every two months and "the least decay thereof in any place speedily and substantially repaired". Cleaning involved clearing small rock falls and removing the build-up of deposited ochre (Hydrated iron oxide). It was inspected 14 times between 1759 and 1767 and in 1768 workmen spent 49 weeks cleaning the sough and a payment was made for repairing the hoppets (buckets) used to haul debris up the nearest shaft. Regular inspections were carried out until 1923 and its abandonment ultimately led to the flooding of the Aspull and Westhoughton pits in 1932.

Supporting pillars of cannel were accidentally ignited in the Cannel seam in March 1737 and the underground fire was still burning in the October despite the ventilation shafts being covered. The fire was eventually extinguished in 1738 after the sough was dammed and the workings flooded.

The sough's entrance portal is constructed from brick and stone and leads into a brick-lined culvert. The portal and 2 metres (6 ft 7 in) of the culvert is a scheduled monument.

== Discharge ==
The sough discharged iron-rich minewater into the Yellow Brook in Bottling Wood, discolouring it, and the River Douglas downstream, with ochre deposits. Water infiltrated the pits by percolating through the overlying porous rock strata containing bands of ironstone, not via the shafts. After heavy rain in December 1929, 561,600 gallons of water drained from the sough into the brook at a rate of 290 gallons per minute. In 1978 the rate was 352 gallons per minute, more than 500,000 gallons per day.

In 2004 the Coal Authority provided a passive treatment plant in a scheme costing £750,000. Work was undertaken by Ascot Environmental who built a pumping station, pipelines, settlement lagoons, and reedbeds and landscaped the site. The scheme has improved the water quality, removed manganese and iron which caused the discolouration and allowed fish to repopulate the brook.
