= Listed buildings in Aspull =

Aspull is a village in the Metropolitan Borough of Wigan, Greater Manchester, England. The village and the surrounding countryside contain 21 listed buildings that are recorded in the National Heritage List for England. Of these, one is listed at Grade II*, the middle of the three grades, and the others are at Grade II, the lowest grade.

There has been coal mining in the area from the 16th century, but that has ceased and the area is now rural and residential. The oldest listed buildings are houses, farmhouses and farm buildings. The only surviving listed buildings from the coal mining era are a row of miners' cottages and a ventilation chimney. The Leeds and Liverpool Canal passes through the area, and the listed buildings associated with this are bridges and a flight of locks, and a lock keeper's cottage. Also listed is a church.

== Key ==
Grade	Criteria
II*	Particularly important buildings of more than special interest
II	Buildings of national importance and special interest

== Buildings ==
Name and location	Photograph	Date	Notes	Grade
Barn, Gidlow Hall; 53.55838°N 2.56853°W	—	16th century (possible)	The barn has been converted for residential use. It is in brick on a stone plinth, and has a roof of slate at the front and stone-slate at the rear. It has five bays, with a later adjoining outbuilding.	II
Gidlow Hall; 53.55883°N 2.56780°W	—	1574	A farmhouse on a moated site that was reduced in size and partly rebuilt in 1840. It is in stone with quoins, and has two storeys, two bays, and a later brick outshut at the rear. The windows on the front are small-paned casements, and elsewhere are mullioned windows. Above the doorway is a fanlight and a lintel with an armorial crest. At the rear is a bay with a coped gable.	II
Ainscow's Farmhouse; 53.56293°N 2.57367°W		17th century	The farmhouse, which was later extended, is in brick on a stone plinth with stone dressings, quoins, and a stone-slate roof. There are two storeys and four bays, the later first bay is recessed and lower, the others bays are gabled, and the third bay projects. The windows are casements, and some are mullioned.	II
Kirkless Hall and Kirkless Hall Farmhouse; 53.55239°N 2.60008°W		17th century	Originally one house, later divided into two, it is basically cruck and timber framed, with later alterations and extensions. The house is in brick with stone dressings and a slate roof. There are two storeys with attics, and seven bays, the second and fifth bays projecting and gabled. The first four bays have a stone plinth, the first bay has quoins, the fifth bay is rendered and painted to resemble timber framing. The windows are sashes, some with wedge lintels, and others with brick cambered arches.	II*
Barn, Pennington Hall; 53.55437°N 2.57284°W	—	17th century (probable)	The upper part of the barn was rebuilt in the 18th century. It is in brick with buttresses, some quoins, and a stone-slate roof. The barn contains elliptical-headed openings and ventilation holes in diamond patterns. There are lean-tos on the right and at the rear.	II
Wall, Pennington Hall; 53.55422°N 2.57316°W	—	17th century	The wall encloses the garden in front of the hall. It is in brick with stone coping, moulded on the top.	II
Pennington Hall; 53.55438°N 2.57317°W		1653	The house was later extended. It is in brick with diapering and a stone-slate roof. There are two storeys and four bays, the first and third bays projecting and gabled. The windows are mullioned with hood moulds, and the date is spelt out in brick in the first bay.	II
Bark Hill Farmhouse and barn 53.56119°N 2.59900°W		1700	The farmhouse and barn are in stone with roofs of slate and stone-slate. The farmhouse has two storeys and two bays, the right bay higher and projecting, and the windows are casements. The barn to the left has four bays, and contains windows, doorways and pitching holes. In the fourth bay is an elliptical hole, and in the left return are two owl holes.	II
Colliers Arms public house 53.56124°N 2.59868°W		1700	The public house is stuccoed and has applied timber framing and a slate roof. There are three storeys and two bays, and above the central doorway is a datestone. On the front, the windows on the lower two floors are 20th-century casements, and on the top floor they are mullioned. At the rear is a stair window that is sashed, and the other windows are mullioned.	II
Higher Highfield; 53.57461°N 2.59253°W		1714	A brick farmhouse, partly rendered, on a stone plinth, with a band and a stone-slate roof. There are two storeys and three bays, the first bay projecting and gabled. The windows are casements with plain lintels, and there is a datestone in the third bay.	II
Hilton's Farm and outbuildings 53.56818°N 2.59279°W		c. 1730	The outbuildings originated as workers' cottages in about 1830. They and the farmhouse are in sandstone and brick, and all are rendered with roofs of stone slabs. The farmhouse has three bays and a doorway with a moulded surround and a shaped keystone. Most of the windows are casements, some of which have keystones, and there is one small horizontally-sliding sash window. The cottages have been converted for other uses.	II
Marsh Farmhouse; 53.55445°N 2.58308°W	—	Mid-18th century	A brick farmhouse on a chamfered stone plinth with bands and a stone-slate roof. There are two storeys and two bays. The windows and doorway have cambered brick arches; the windows are 20th-century casements. To the right is a barn extension with ventilation holes.	II
Barn, Marsh Farm; 53.55461°N 2.58281°W	—	18th century (probable)	The barn is in stone with a stone-slate roof, and has three bays. It contains large entrance doors, ventilation holes, and a pitching hole.	II
Walker's Higher Farmhouse; 53.57165°N 2.58004°W		1755	A brick farmhouse on a stone plinth, with quoins and a stone-slate roof. There are three storeys and a symmetrical front of three bays. The windows are small-pane casements with wedge lintels and keystones. The central doorway has a fanlight and a wedge lintel, and above the middle window on the first floor is a round datestone in the form of a rococo cartouche.	II
Hindley Hall; 53.54833°N 2.57954°W		1767 (possible)	The house was largely rebuilt in 1811, and has since been used as a golf clubhouse. It is in brick on a stone plinth, with stone dressings, quoins, bands, a top cornice and a parapet. The house is in Georgian style, with three storeys and seven bays, a later extension of two storeys and two bays, and a small service wing at the rear. The doorway has pilasters and an entablature, and the windows are sashes with wedge lintels.	II
Dukes Row; 53.56630°N 2.59281°W		Late 18th century	A terrace of 16 workers' houses in stone that have a tiled roof with coped gables. They have two storeys, and most houses have one bay. The doorways and windows have plain surrounds, and the windows are 20th-century two-light casements.	II
Lock Keeper's Cottage and wall 53.55615°N 2.59330°W		Late 18th or early 19th century	The cottage is adjacent to the top lock of the Wigan Flight on the Leeds and Liverpool Canal. It is in stone with a slate roof, two storeys, two bays, and a lean-to extension to the right. The windows and doorways have plain surrounds, and the windows are sashes. In front of the cottage is a garden wall with coping.	II
Two bridges and flight of 13 locks 53.55128°N 2.60098°W		1816	The bridges and locks are on the Leeds and Liverpool Canal. Bridge No. 57 is in stone with an elliptical arch, rusticated voussoirs and keystones, bands, parapets, and end piers. The arch of bridge No. 58 has been replaced by concrete beams. The locks are numbers 1 to 13 on the Wigan flight of locks. They are in stone and have gates in timber or iron.	II
Monk Hall Bridge; 53.55588°N 2.59174°W		Early to mid-19th century	Bridge No. 59, carrying Withington Lane over an arm of the Leeds and Liverpool Canal. It is in stone, and consists of a single semi-elliptical arch. The bridge has rusticated voussoirs and keystones, a string course along the base of the parapet, and swept wings ending in piers.	II
Wall Hey Pit Furnace ventilation chimney 53.57406°N 2.59036°W		1840	The chimney is in brick and is square, with clasping pilasters at the corners. At the apex is a drip mould and a staggered cornice. The cap is missing, and the openings have been blocked.	II
St Elizabeth's Church; 53.56338°N 2.57492°W		1876	The church was designed by J. Medland and Henry Taylor, and is built in common brick with dressings in red brick and stone, and has a slate roof. It consists of a nave and chancel win a single vessel with a clerestory, a west baptistry, a south aisles, and a south organ loft. At the junction of the nave and the chancel is a small octagonal bellcote with a spirelet. Most of the windows are lancets, and in the west end is a wheel window.	II
