= Bradshaigh baronets =

Extinct baronetcy in the Baronetage of England

The Bradshaigh Baronetcy, of Haigh in the County of Lancaster, was a title in the Baronetage of England. It was created on 17 November 1679 for Roger Bradshaigh, formerly a Member of Parliament for Lancashire. The second Baronet represented Wigan and Lancashire in Parliament. The third Baronet sat as Member of Parliament for Wigan for over fifty years and was Father of the House of Commons. The title became extinct on the death of the fourth Baronet in 1770. He was buried at Wigan Parish Church on 3 December 1770.

The family seat was Haigh Hall, Haigh, Lancashire. After the death of the fourth Baronet the estate was inherited by his great-niece Elizabeth Dalrymple, wife of Alexander Lindsay, 6th Earl of Balcarres. The house was in the Lindsay family until 1947.

The family name is pronounced Bradshaw.

== Bradshaigh baronets, of Haigh (1679) ==
- Sir Roger Bradshaigh, 1st Baronet (1628–1684)
- Sir Roger Bradshaigh, 2nd Baronet (c. 1649–1687)
- Sir Roger Bradshaigh, 3rd Baronet (1675–1747)
- Sir Roger Bradshaigh, 4th Baronet (c. 1710–1770)
