= Dorothy Bradshaigh =

(1854–1937) British social reformer and writer

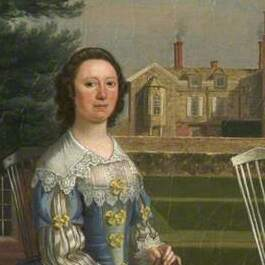
- Dorothy Lady Bradshaigh (née Bellingham), painting detail by Edward Haytley
- Baptised: 21 March 1705
- Died: August 1785
- Occupation: Correspondent
- Spouse(s): Sir Roger Bradshaigh, 4th Bt.
- Parent(s): William Bellingham
- Family: Elizabeth, Lady Echlin

Dorothy Bradshaigh (baptised 1705, d. 1785), British letter writer and cookery book compiler. After her marriage she lived at Haigh Hall near Wigan. Her letters and suggestions to Samuel Richardson influenced his novel The History of Sir Charles Grandison.

== Life ==
Bradshaigh was baptised on 21 March 1705 at Rufford, Lancashire. She was born with the last name of Bellingham - her parents were Elizabeth, (born Spencer) and some-time lawyer William Bellingham. She and her sister Elizabeth were her father's co-heirs and they shared their childhood home with Elizabeth Hesketh who was their mother's daughter from her first marriage. Her father's family home had been Levens Hall in Westmoreland until this was sold in 1688 as a result of the over spending by her paternal uncle, Alan. Her father's finances were transformed when he married her mother.

She contacted Samuel Richardson anonymously when his novel Clarissa was part published in 1748. Her initial two letters requested a happy ending for the serialised work and Samuel replied to her by placing an advert in the Whitehall Evening Post. She used a nom de plume of Belfour as she sent him many more letters. She did not reveal that she was his correspondent until February 1750 and she met him in the following month.

She and Samuel Richardson exchanged more letters and he shared drafts of his next novel, The History of Sir Charles Grandison, with her. She would make comments in the margins of his drafts and he would then make amendments. Richardson wrote that his book was "owing to you … more than to any one Person besides". Richardson valued her opinions and he planned to reissue his earlier novels Pamela and Clarissa based on her comments. Dorothy and her sister identified her with the character of Charlotte in The History of Sir Charles Grandison. Edward Haytley painted a portrait of her and her husband which includes Haigh Hall in the background. Richardson requested a copy of the painting for himself, in exchange for a copy of a painting of him. In Hayter's painting she holds a book and her husband has a telescope to show their interests.

== Private life ==
She married Sir Roger Bradshaigh, Baronet and they had no children.

== Death and legacy ==
Her husband died in 1770 and she died in 1785 at Haigh Hall. She created a cookery book which is extant.

In 1804 a "fictitious" portrait of her was engraved and published. This is now in the National Portrait Gallery.
