= Alexander Lindsay, 25th Earl of Crawford =

Scottish peer (1812-1880)

Alexander William Crawford Lindsay
- Born: 16 October 1812; Muncaster Castle, Cumbria, England
- Died: 13 December 1880 (aged 68); Florence, Italy
- Resting place: Dunecht House, Aberdeen, Scotland
- Education: Trinity College, Cambridge; Eton College
- Occupations: Scottish peer, art historian and collector
- Notable work: Progression by Antagonism; Sketches of the History of Christian Art; Letters on Egypt, Edom and the Holy Land
- Spouse: Margaret Lindsay
- Children: 7; including Lady Mary Susan Félicie Lindsay, Lady Alice Frances Lindsay, Lady Margaret Elizabeth Lindsay, Mabel Lindsay, James Ludovic Lindsay, 26th Earl of Crawford, Lady Anne Catherine Sybil Lindsay and Lady Jane Evelyn Lindsay
- Father: James Lindsay, 24th Earl of Crawford

Alexander William Crawford Lindsay, 25th Earl of Crawford, 8th Earl of Balcarres (16 October 1812 – 13 December 1880), styled Lord Lindsay between 1825 and 1869, was a Scottish peer, art historian and collector.

== Life ==
Lindsay was born at Muncaster Castle in Cumbria, the son of James Lindsay, 24th Earl of Crawford. He was educated at Eton and Trinity College, Cambridge.

He travelled widely studying art. He published Progression by Antagonism in 1846 and Sketches of the History of Christian Art in 1847. He became an avid art collector and many of his acquisitions are on display in galleries around the world.

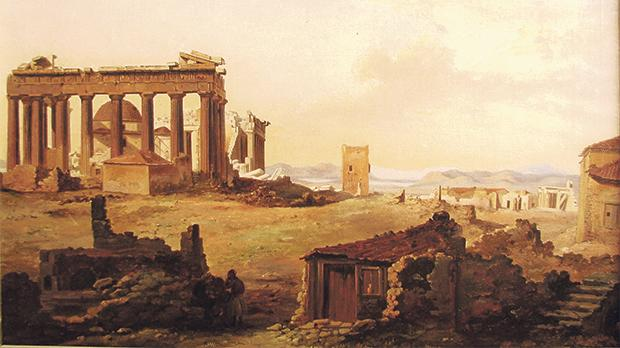
Lord Lindsay invited the artist Antonio Schranz to Palmyra, as a part of his well armed caravan in 1837

He travelled to the Middle East in 1837/38, writing Letters on Egypt, Edom and the Holy Land. Later, he wrote Etruscan Inscriptions Analysed (1872), and The Earldom of Mar during 500 years (1882).

In 1864, he commissioned Charles James Freake to build a town house for the Lindsays in Grosvenor Square.

His other passion was genealogy. He was the author of the three-volume Lives of the Lindsays on the genealogy of his family. In 1868 he published A memoir of Lady Anna Mackenzie, countess of Balcarres and afterwards of Argyll, 1621-1706, which recorded the life of Lady Anna Mackenzie.

In 1869, he inherited the earldom of Crawford and the earldom of Balcarres from his father James Lindsay, 24th Earl of Crawford, 7th Earl of Balcarres,

Lindsay died in 1880 aged 68 in Florence, Italy and his coffin was brought home for burial in a new family crypt at Dunecht House, near Aberdeen. Some time afterwards the body was stolen and eventually recovered from a shallow grave 14 months later. A monument marks where the body was found at Dunecht but the Earl's remains were reburied in the family vault in Wigan. A local poacher was convicted of grave robbing.

Lindsay was succeeded by his son James Lindsay, 26th Earl of Crawford.

== Marriage and children ==
On 23 July 1846 Crawford married Margaret Lindsay, daughter of Lt Gen James Lindsay and sister of Robert James Loyd-Lindsay VC KCB, 1st and last Baron Wantage of Lockinge. They had 7 children:

- Lady Mary Susan Félicie Lindsay (died 27 November 1937), married Hon Frederick George Lindley Wood (later Meynell), son of Charles Wood, 1st Viscount Halifax.
- Lady Alice Frances Lindsay (died 28 September 1915) married George Branson Eyre ( later assumed surname Archer Houblon).
- Lady Margaret Elizabeth Lindsay (died 4 January 1912), married Lewis Majendie (MP), owner of Hedingham Castle
- Mabel Lindsay
- James Ludovic Lindsay, 26th Earl of Crawford (28 July 1847 – 31 January 1913)
- Lady Anne Catherine Sybil Lindsay (1858 – 15 December 1936), married Hon Francis Bowes-Lyon, son of Claude Bowes-Lyon, 13th Earl of Strathmore and Kinghorne, and became Queen Elizabeth The Queen Mother's paternal aunt-by-marriage.
- Lady Jane Evelyn Lindsay (14 May 1862 – 2 January 1948)

== Bibliotheca Lindesiana ==
The Bibliotheca Lindesiana, was planned by Lord Lindsay and both he and his eldest son were instrumental in building it up to such an extent that was one of the most impressive private collections in Britain at the time, both for its size and for the rarity of some of the materials it contained.

The bulk of the library was kept at Haigh Hall in Lancashire with a part at Balcarres. The 26th Earl issued an extensive catalogue of the library in 1910: Catalogue of the Printed Books Preserved at Haigh Hall, Wigan, 4 vols. folio, Aberdeen University Press, printers. Companion volumes to the catalogue record the royal proclamations and philatelic literature. The cataloguing and organization of the library was a major task for a team of librarians led by J. P. Edmond. The manuscript collections (including Chinese and Japanese printed books) were sold in 1901 to Enriqueta Augustina Rylands for the John Rylands Library.

Peerage of Scotland
Preceded by James Lindsay	Earl of Crawford; Earl of Balcarres; 1869–1880	Succeeded by James Lindsay
