= Listed buildings in Haigh, Greater Manchester =

Haigh is a civil parish in the Metropolitan Borough of Wigan, Greater Manchester, England. It contains 30 listed buildings that are recorded in the National Heritage List for England. Of these, one is listed at Grade II*, the middle grade, and the others are at Grade II, the lowest grade. The parish contains the village of Haigh, the estate of Haigh Hall, and the surrounding countryside. The most important building in the parish is Haigh Hall; this and a number of buildings in the estate are listed. The Leeds and Liverpool Canal runs through the parish, and three bridges associated with it are listed. The other listed buildings include farmhouses, farm buildings, a set of stocks, houses, workers' cottages, a church and associated structures, a school, and a bridge over a disused railway.

== Key ==
Grade	Criteria
II*	Particularly important buildings of more than special interest
II	Buildings of national importance and special interest

== Buildings ==
Name and location	Photograph	Date	Notes	Grade
Barn, Brock Mill Farm; 53.56909°N 2.63023°W	—	17th century (probable)	The barn is in stone with a stone-slate roof and four bays. To the right is a cow house with a cat slide roof, to the left is a lean-to shed, and the entrance is through barn doors.	II
Brock Mill Farmhouse; 53.56897°N 2.63047°W	—	17th century (possible)	A stone farmhouse that has a stone-slate roof with one coped gable, two storeys, and two bays. There is a central doorway, and the windows are three-light casements with wedge lintels.	II
Stocks; 53.57386°N 2.60934°W		18th century	The stocks are adjacent to the drive leading to Haigh Hall. They consist of two stone posts with shaped tops and grooves for foot restraints. The foot restraints are in timber.	II
The Receptacle; 53.56306°N 2.62274°W		1772	Originally almshouses, later private houses, they are in stone with rusticated quoins and a hipped slate roof. The windows are paired with pointed heads and small-pane glazing, and the doorways have pointed tympana. On the left return are external stairs.	II
Bridge over entrance to canal basin 53.56699°N 2.61353°W		1780s	The bridge carries the towpath of the Leeds and Liverpool Canal over the entrance to a canal basin. It is in stone, and consists of an elliptical arch with a band, a parapet, and end piers.	II
Pendlebury Bridge; 53.57653°N 2.62387°W		1780s	This is bridge No. 62 on the Leeds and Liverpool Canal and carries Pendlebury Lane over the canal. It is in stone, and consists of a single elliptical arch with a band, a triple keystone, a parapet, and end piers.	II
Red Rock Bridge; 53.58408°N 2.62839°W		1790s	The bridge carries Red Rock Lane (B5239 road) over the Leeds and Liverpool Canal. It is in stone, and consists of a single elliptical arch with a band, a triple keystone, a parapet, and end piers.	II
Brock Mill Cottages; 53.56920°N 2.63124°W	—	1821	A pair of stone houses with a hipped slate roof, two storeys, and three bays. The windows are casements with cusped heads and lintels with cambered soffits, and the doorways have plain surrounds.	II
Haigh Hall; 53.57178°N 2.60950°W		1827–40	A country house in stone with a cornice at the top and a parapet. It has a square plan, three storeys, and an entrance front of eleven bays. Most of the windows are sashes, with some casement windows. In the middle three bays of the front is a hexastyle Tuscan porch with paired columns to each end. The doorway has an architrave, panelled pilasters, a frieze and a cornice with consoles. In the left and right returns are full-height canted bay windows.	II*
Stone Row; 53.56073°N 2.59969°W		1830	A terrace of six workers' cottages in sandstone with roofs of tile at the front and slate at the rear. They have two storeys, a double-depth plan, and one bay each. The doors are to the right, and the windows have canted heads and contain casements.	II
Holly Bank; 53.56217°N 2.60319°W	—	c. 1830	A stuccoed house on a stone plinth with a stone-slate roof, two storeys, and three bays. The central bay projects forward, it is gabled, and has a porch and a door with a fanlight. The windows are mullioned with cusped heads.	II
Lodge, Haigh Hall; 53.56610°N 2.61471°W	—	c. 1830	The lodge is in stone with a hipped slate roof. It has a U-shaped plan, one storey, a front of four bays, and two bays on the sides. The windows have round heads, and the doorway has a segmental head and a chamfered surround.	II
St David's Church; 53.57588°N 2.59615°W		1830–33	A commissioners' church designed by Thomas Rickman and Henry Hutchinson, it was extended at the east end in 1886 by J. Medland Taylor. The church is in stone and has a slate roof with a tiled crest. It consists of a nave, a west porch and a north projection, and a chancel with a south organ loft. At the west end is a gabled bellcote. Inside the church is a west gallery.	II
Lychgate and churchyard wall, St David's Church; 53.57601°N 2.59552°W		1837	The churchyard wall is the earlier, the lychgate being dated 1909, and are in stone. The lychgate has a stone-slate hipped roof, segmental-pointed arches, and cornices with lettering and gargoyles. On the sides are recesses with dog-tooth mouldings, and contain windows with cusped heads. On the roof is a cross, and inside are two seats. The walls stretch to the north and east, and are about 200 metres (660 ft) long.	II
Haigh Sawmill; 53.56104°N 2.60260°W		1839–41	Originally workshops, later a house, it is in stone with a slate roof, two storeys, and three bays. It has a projecting plain parapet that is raised in the centre with a clock face, and the doorway has a lintel with a keystone. On the roof is an octagonal cupola with Tuscan columns.	II
Moat House; 53.57692°N 2.60509°W		c. 1840	A large house with attached outbuilding in brick with stone dressings and hipped and gabled Welsh slate roofs. It has two storeys, an irregular cruciform plan, an entrance front of four bays, and a single-storey outbuilding to the north. On the front is an openwork cast iron porch and a door with a fanlight, and to the left is a full-height canted bay window with an open pediment. There is another canted bay window on the west front, and the windows are sashes. The house stands on a former moated site which is a Scheduled Monument.	II
St David's School and school house 53.57635°N 2.59633°W		1845	The school and former schoolmaster's house are in brick with stone dressings, and have a slate roof with a tiled crest. It is mainly in one storey with nine bays, the central and outer bays projecting forward and gabled with decorative bargeboards. The windows have chamfered architraves and hood moulds, and contain small-paned casements. On the upper floor of the first bay is a round-headed window, and in the ninth bay is an oculus. In the central bay are two doorways with chamfered architraves and hood moulds and above is an octagonal plaque and a sundial.	II
Windmill; 53.57519°N 2.59853°W		1845	The wind pump is in brick, and consists of a round tapering tower with a ribbed timber top, a finial, and four sails. There is an entrance, two windows, and three cellar openings with stone lintels, all of which are blocked.	II
Haighlands; 53.57670°N 2.60389°W		Mid-19th century	A stone house with a stone-slate roof, two storeys and five bays. The first bay projects, it is gabled, and has a canted bay window. In the fourth bay is a French window, and on the front is timber trellis porch. Most of the windows are sashes, and there is a conservatory on the right return.	II
Farm building, Home Farm; 53.57474°N 2.60774°W	—	1853	The farm building consists of four ranges around a courtyard. The buildings are in brick with quoins, stone dressings and hipped slate roofs. The front range has seven bays, the central bay projecting forward and containing an elliptical-headed archway with a rusticated surround and a datestone. The right bay also projects, and contains a bull's eye pitching hole. The windows have rusticated jambs and contain casements.	II
Home Farmhouse; 53.57480°N 2.60721°W		c. 1853	The farmhouse is in brick with stone dressings, a slate roof, two storeys, and two bays. The windows are casements with architraves and pointed heads; on the ground floor they have hood moulds, and on the upper floor they are in gabled half-dormers. The central doorway has an architrave, a fanlight, and a hood mould.	II
1–4 School Lane; 53.57496°N 2.60646°W		1854	A row of four brick houses with stone dressings, quoins and a slate roof. There is one storey with attics, and four bays. The outer bays project forward and are gabled with decorative bargeboards. In the centre are paired doorways with hood moulds, and on the sides are gabled porches. The windows are small-paned casements, the middle two on the upper floor in gabled dormers.	II
17–20 Lakeside Cottages; 53.58668°N 2.63447°W		1859	A terrace of four workers' cottages, pebbledashed on the upper floor and stuccoed at the angles, and with a slate roof. They have two storeys and six bays. The windows have chamfered surrounds; they and the doorways have hood moulds. Most of the windows are horizontally-sliding sashes, and there are two casement windows.	II
13–16 Lakeside Cottages; 53.58646°N 2.63456°W		1860	A terrace of four workers' cottages, pebbledashed on the upper floor and stuccoed at the angles, and with a slate roof. They have two storeys and six bays. The windows have chamfered surrounds; they and the doorways have hood moulds. Most of the windows are horizontally-sliding sashes, and there are two casement windows.	II
11 and 12 Lakeside Cottages; 53.58646°N 2.63456°W		1861	A pair of houses, formerly workers' cottages, pebbledashed on the upper floor and stuccoed at the angles, and with a slate roof. They have two storeys and two gabled bays with plain bargeboards and finials. The windows, which are casements, have chamfered surrounds; they and the doorways have hood moulds.	II
1–3 Lakeside Cottages; 53.58565°N 2.63500°W		1862	A terrace of three workers' cottages, pebbledashed on the upper floor, with quoins and a hipped slate roof. They have two storeys and six bays. The windows and doorway have segmental heads and hood moulds. Most of the windows are sashes, but No. 3 has casements.	II
5–8 Lakeside Cottages; 53.58599°N 2.63483°W		1862	A terrace of four workers' cottages, pebbledashed on the upper floor and stuccoed at the angles, and with a slate roof. They have two storeys and six bays. The windows have chamfered surrounds; they and the doorways have hood moulds. Most of the windows are horizontally-sliding sashes, and there are two casement windows.	II
9 and 10 Lakeside Cottages; 53.58615°N 2.63472°W		1862	A pair of houses, formerly workers' cottages, pebbledashed on the upper floor and stuccoed at the angles, and with a slate roof. They have two storeys and two gabled bays with plain bargeboards. The windows have chamfered surrounds; they and the doorways have hood moulds. No. 9 has sash windows and No. 10 has casements.	II
Stables, Haigh Hall; 53.57306°N 2.60979°W		1865	The stable block has a courtyard plan, and parts of it have been altered for other purposes. It is in red brick on a stone plinth, with dressings in stone, and in blue and yellow brick, quoins, and a cornice. There are two storeys, and an entrance range of seven bays. The central and end bays project, the end bays being gabled. The central bay has a round-headed archway, and above it is an Italianate-style tower with clock faces, three round-headed windows on each side, an entablature with a bracketed cornice, and a pyramidal roof with a weathervane. In the other ranges are segmental-headed windows, and at the rear is a dated keystone.	II
Railway bridge 53.56194°N 2.61934°W		1883–84	The bridge carries a footpath over the disused Whelley Loop of the former Lancashire Union Railway. The abutments are in brick on stone plinths, they are faced with ashlar stone pilasters with friezes and moulded modillion cornices, and at the top are moulded pyramidal caps. Between them are three straight-headed arches with a cast iron undercarriage of 13 girders and a balustrade. The balustrade is about 30 metres (98 ft) long and has an arcade of round-arched columns with chamfered copings.	II
