= Edgar Cyril Robinson =

English organist and composer

Edgar Cyril Robinson FRCO (11 May 1877 – 28 January 1953) was an English organist and composer.

== Life ==
He was born in Gainsborough, Lincolnshire on 11 May 1877, the son of George Robinson and Eliza Jane Dyson. His father was organist at Gainsborough parish church for some 40 years, a position in which Edgar would succeed him.

He was educated at Lincoln Cathedral School and gained a Bachelor of Music degree from Oxford University. He was awarded FRCO in 1899. A new 3-manual organ by Walkers was installed in Gainsborough church in 1906 towards the end of his time there.^{p. 169}

On 23 April 1915 he enlisted in No. 23 Squadron RFC and subsequently served overseas.

== Appointments ==
- Assistant organist at Lincoln Cathedral 1895–1899
- Organist of Gainsborough Parish Church 1899–1906
- Organist of All Saints' Church, Wigan 1906–1919
- Choirmaster, Liverpool Cathedral (retired 1947)

== Compositions ==
He composed a descant to the hymn tune, Miles Lane.

== Family life ==
He married Evelyn Mary Buckmaster. They had two children:

- Evelyn Mary Joyce Robinson (1910–1990)
- Katherine Norma Robinson (1914–1984)
