= James Lindsay, 24th Earl of Crawford =

British Army officer and politician (1783–1869)

Earl of Crawford Earl of Balcarres
- Predecessor: Alexander Lindsay, 23rd Earl of Crawford
- Successor: Alexander Lindsay, 25th Earl of Crawford
- Born: James Lindsay; 24 April 1783; Balcarres House
- Died: 15 December 1869 (aged 86)
- Buried: All Saints' Church, Wigan
- Spouse: Maria Margaret Frances Pennington (m. 1811)
- Issue: Alexander Lindsay; James Lindsay; Charles Lindsay; Colin Lindsay

James Lindsay, 24th Earl of Crawford and the 7th Earl of Balcarres (24 April 1783 – 15 December 1869) was a British Army officer and politician.

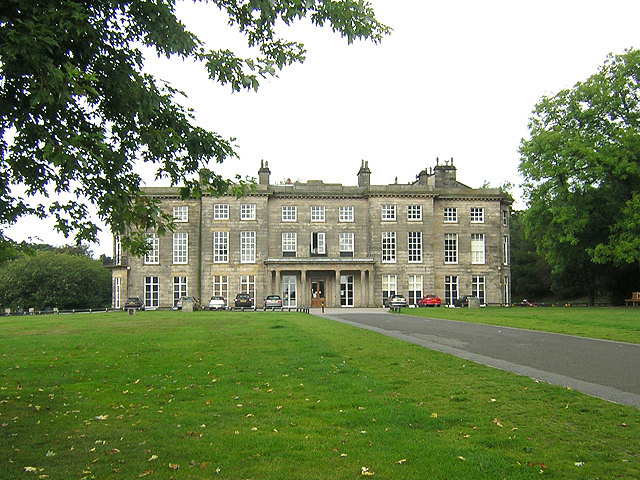
Haigh Hall, built for James Lindsay, 1830–1849

== Biography ==
James Lindsay was born on 24 April 1783 at Balcarres House in Fife, the son of Alexander Lindsay, 6th Earl of Balcarres and inherited the title of 7th Earl of Balcarres on his father's death in 1825. In 1826, he was created Baron of Wigan in the Peerage of Great Britain. In 1843, he claimed the abeyant title of Earl of Crawford and in 1848 the House of Lords allowed the claim and conferred on him the title of 24th Earl of Crawford, and by extension, the title of 23rd Earl of Crawford on his dead father. He was subsequently commissioned into the British Army and attained the rank of major in the 20th Light Dragoons until he left in 1804. He was returned as Tory MP for Wigan from 1820 to 1825.

After the Slave Compensation Act 1837 was passed, he successfully claimed one third of the compensation given out by the British government for the Army's practise of hiring slaves in Jamaica as temporary labourers from the partnership Atkinson & Hozier. The Army contract had been negotiated by his father when he had served as the governor of Jamaica. He designed Haigh Hall in Haigh, Greater Manchester, to replace the then-existing hall which dated back to Norman times and lived in a cottage in the grounds whilst it was constructed between 1830 and 1849. The family owned Haigh Colliery, cannel and coal mines, and formed the Wigan Coal and Iron Company in 1865. After his death on 23 December 1869 he was buried at All Saints' Church, Wigan, Lancashire, and succeeded by his eldest son, Alexander Lindsay, 25th Earl of Crawford.

== Marriage and children ==
On 21 November 1811 at Muncaster in Cumberland (now Cumbria), Crawford married the Hon Maria Margaret Frances Pennington, daughter of John Pennington, 1st Baron Muncaster. They had four sons:

- Alexander William Crawford Lindsay, 25th Earl of Crawford (16 October 1812 - 13 December 1880)
- Lt Gen Hon Sir James Lindsay (25 August 1815 - 13 August 1874)
- Colonel Hon Charles Hugh Lindsay (11 November 1816 - 25 March 1889)
- Hon Colin Lindsay (6 December 1819 - 28 January 1892)

Eldest son Alexander's genealogical research had enabled his father to claim the title of Earl of Crawford which had fallen into abeyance.

Parliament of the United Kingdom
Preceded by Sir Robert Holt Leigh; John Hodson	Member of Parliament for Wigan; 1820–1825; With: James Alexander Hodson	Succeeded by James Lindsay (1791-1855)
Peerage of Scotland
Preceded by Alexander Lindsay	Earl of Crawford; 1848 – 1869	Succeeded by Alexander Lindsay
Preceded by Alexander Lindsay	Earl of Balcarres; 1825– 1869	Succeeded by Alexander Lindsay
