= Sir Roger Bradshaigh, 1st Baronet =

Sir Roger Bradshaigh, 1st Baronet (14 January 1628 – 31 March 1684) was an English politician who sat in the House of Commons from 1660 to 1679.

Bradshaigh was the third but oldest surviving son of James Bradshaigh of Haigh Hall, Haigh, Lancashire, by Anne, daughter of Sir William Norris of Speke

In 1660, he was elected member of parliament (MP) for Lancashire in the Convention Parliament. and was knighted on 18 June 1660. In 1661 he was re-elected MP for Lancashire in the Cavalier Parliament and sat until 1679. He served as High Sheriff of Lancashire for 1679 and was created baronet on 17 November 1679.

Roger Bradshaigh developed coal and cannell pits under his Haigh Hall estate and the Great Haigh Sough, a 1,120 yards (1,020 m) tunnel to drain them, was driven under the estate between 1653 and 1670.

Bradshaigh died at the age of 57 on a visit to Chester and was buried at Wigan. He had married Elizabeth, the daughter of William Pennington of Muncaster, Cumberland. They had four sons (only one surviving him) and three daughters. Sir Roger Bradshaigh, 2nd Baronet (1699–1770) married Dorothy Bellingham who was a noted correspondent of Samuel Richardson.

Baronetage of England
New creation	Baronet (of Haigh); 1679–1684	Succeeded by Roger Bradshaigh
