= Edward Haytley =

English painter

The Brockman family at Beachborough: Temple pond with temple in right foreground

The Brockman family at Beachborough: Temple pond with temple in the distance. The woman holding a fishing pole, middle distance right, is thought be Susanna Highmore

Edward Haytley was an English portrait and landscape painter of the 18th century. He was born in 1713, but his works are documented to the period 1740–1764; other biographical detail is equally sparse, but the background of some early professional associates and early sitters suggests he may have come from Lancashire.

== Works ==
Few of his works survive, but he appears to have specialised in the 'conversation piece' form, popular with the landed gentry of mid-18th century England. This form set a group portrait against the backdrop of an idealised representation of the subjects' estates.

His works in this form include:

- one portrait of Elizabeth Robinson with her parents-in-law, Edward and Elizabeth Montagu, at Sandleford Priory (1744), near Newbury, Berkshire.
- six portraits of the Stanley family, including one of Sir Robert and Lady Bradshaigh (1746) in front of Haigh Hall
- two portraits of the Brockman family on its Kent estate, Beachborough, both showing the newly constructed Temple Pond.

One of the latter may include the figure of Susanna Highmore, daughter of the portrait painter Joseph Highmore.

In addition, he accepted commissions for numerous conventional portraits.

Aside from these, his best known works are probably the oil-on-canvas roundels of the Bethlem (1746) and Chelsea (1746) Hospitals, donated to the Foundling Hospital, London. Haytley, like other artists who donated works, was elected a governor of the Hospital.

His last recorded work, dated 1764, was a portrait, depicting Sir William Milner, Bt.

He is assumed to have died around this date.

== Images ==
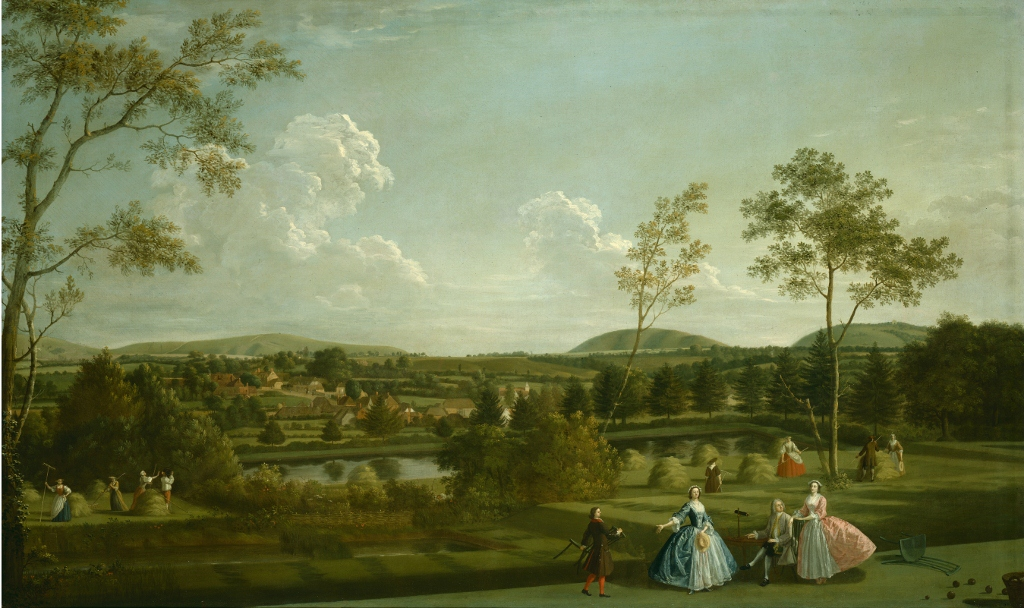
1744 Montagu family at Sandleford.

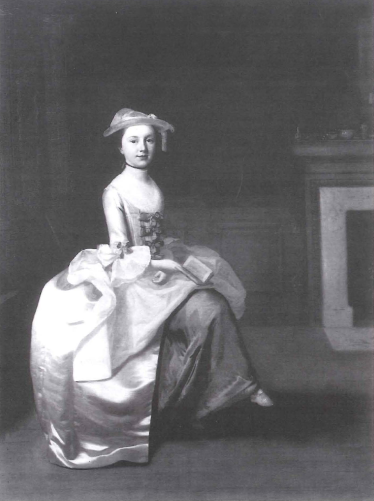
Sarah Scott, 1744

- 1744: Elizabeth Montagu and family at Sandleford Priory.
- 1744: Sarah Scott
- 1746: Chelsea Hospital roundel Foundling Museum
- 1746: Bethlem Hospital roundel Foundling Museum
- 1746: Sir Robert and Lady Bradshaigh Museum of Wigan Life, Greater Manchester Museums Group (GMMG)
- 1752: A Sportsman Yale Center for British Art
- 17??: Huntsman with a whippet private collection
- 17??: Lady Burlington Chiswick House, English Heritage
- 17??: Elizabeth Brockman private collection
- 1750-61: Elizabeth Wandesford (1728-1756) Marble Hill House, English Heritage
- 1764: Sir William Milner, 2nd Baronet Fitzwilliam Museum

== Sources ==
- Hugh Belsey, "Haytley, Edward (fl. 1740–1764)", Oxford Dictionary of National Biography, Oxford University Press, 2004 accessed 1 July 2007
- National Gallery Victoria, Australia
- Lionel Henry Cust (1891). "Haytley, Edward" . In Stephen, Leslie; Lee, Sidney (eds.). Dictionary of National Biography. Vol. 25. London: Smith, Elder & Co.
