= Sough =

Underground channel for water drainage

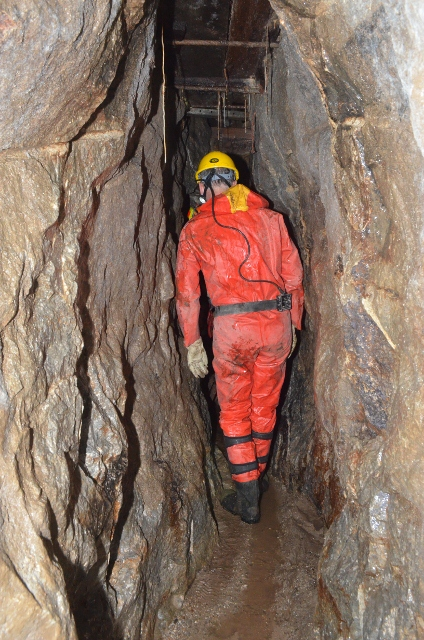
Peakshole Sough

A sough (pronounced /saʊ/ or /sʌf/) is an underground channel for draining water.

It can be for draining mines; where the mine sump is lower than the outlet, water must be pumped up to the sough.

It can also drain sloping farmland: these are to be found (at least) around the Pennine areas of East Lancashire to carry water from higher up, down through the clay based fields to reduce flooding and soft ground.

== Derbyshire lead mining ==
The term is closely associated with the lead mining areas of Derbyshire (see Derbyshire lead mining history). Early Derbyshire lead mines were fairly shallow, since methods to remove water were inefficient and miners had to stop when they reached the water table. By digging soughs, miners found they could lower the water table and allow mines to be worked deeper.

Soughs were typically dug from their open end near a stream or river back into the hillside beneath the mine to be drained. One sough would often drain more than one mine, since these were often very close, working the same vein of lead. This also helped spread the cost of digging the sough. Some soughs include branches to facilitate further drainage.

Many soughs were dug throughout the 17th and 18th centuries. The falling price of lead brought the decline of the Derbyshire lead mining industry towards the end of the 19th century.

Some soughs were very extensive. Meerbrook sough is over four miles in length. Digging such long tunnels took a long time. Vermuyden sough, named after the Dutch engineer, Cornelius Vermuyden, who planned it, took 20 years to dig. The Cromford sough, which Sir Richard Arkwright subsequently used to power his mill at Cromford, took 30 years to dig. It was still being extended a century after construction began.

Some soughs are still in use. According to the British Geological Survey, the Meerbrook sough, started in 1772, still provides 3.75 million litres (990,000 US gal) a day for the public water supply.

== Elsewhere ==
The coal mining industry depended on using soughs until the mines became too deep to be drained by this means. With the advent of the steam engine, which could pump out water, soughs became less necessary for de-watering mines.

== See also ==
- Adit
- Great Haigh Sough
- Glossary of coal mining terminology
- Mine dewatering
