= Haigh Hall =

Listed building in Greater Manchester, England

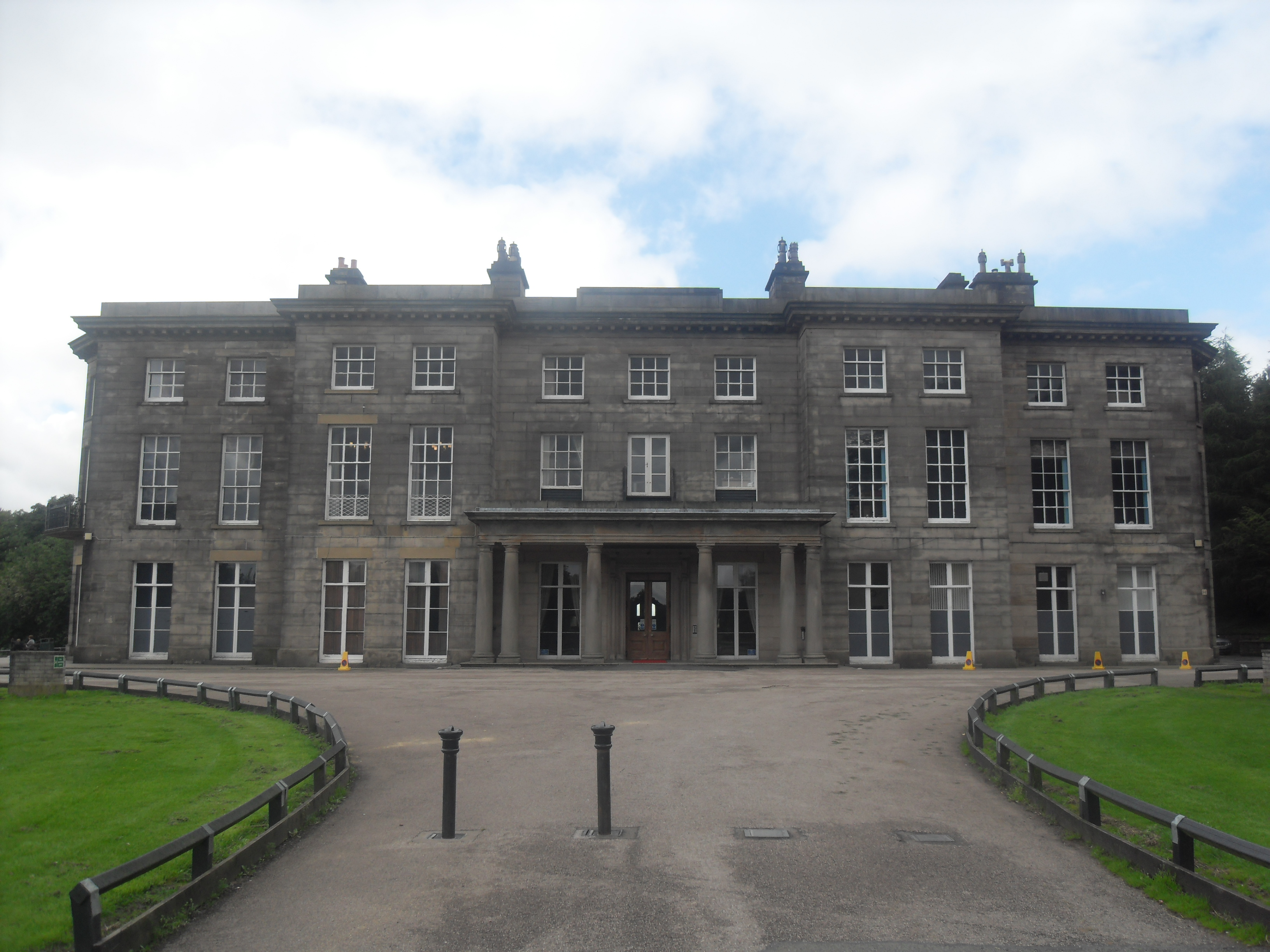
- Haigh Hall in 2010

- Location within Greater Manchester

General information
- Type: Country house
- Location: Haigh, Greater Manchester, England
- Coordinates: 53.5717°N 2.6092°W
- Construction started: 1827
- Completed: 1840
- Client: James Lindsay, 7th Earl of Balcarres
- Owner: Wigan Leisure and Culture Trust

Design and construction
- Designations

Listed Building – Grade II*
- Official name: Haigh Hall
- Designated: 19 November 1951
- Reference no.: 1228292

Haigh Hall is a historic country house in Haigh, a village in the Metropolitan Borough of Wigan, Greater Manchester, England. Built between 1827 and 1840 for James Lindsay, 7th Earl of Balcarres, it replaced an ancient manor house and was a Lindsay family home until 1947, when it was sold to Wigan Corporation. The hall is recorded in the National Heritage List for England as a designated Grade II* listed building and is owned by Wigan Council.

== History ==
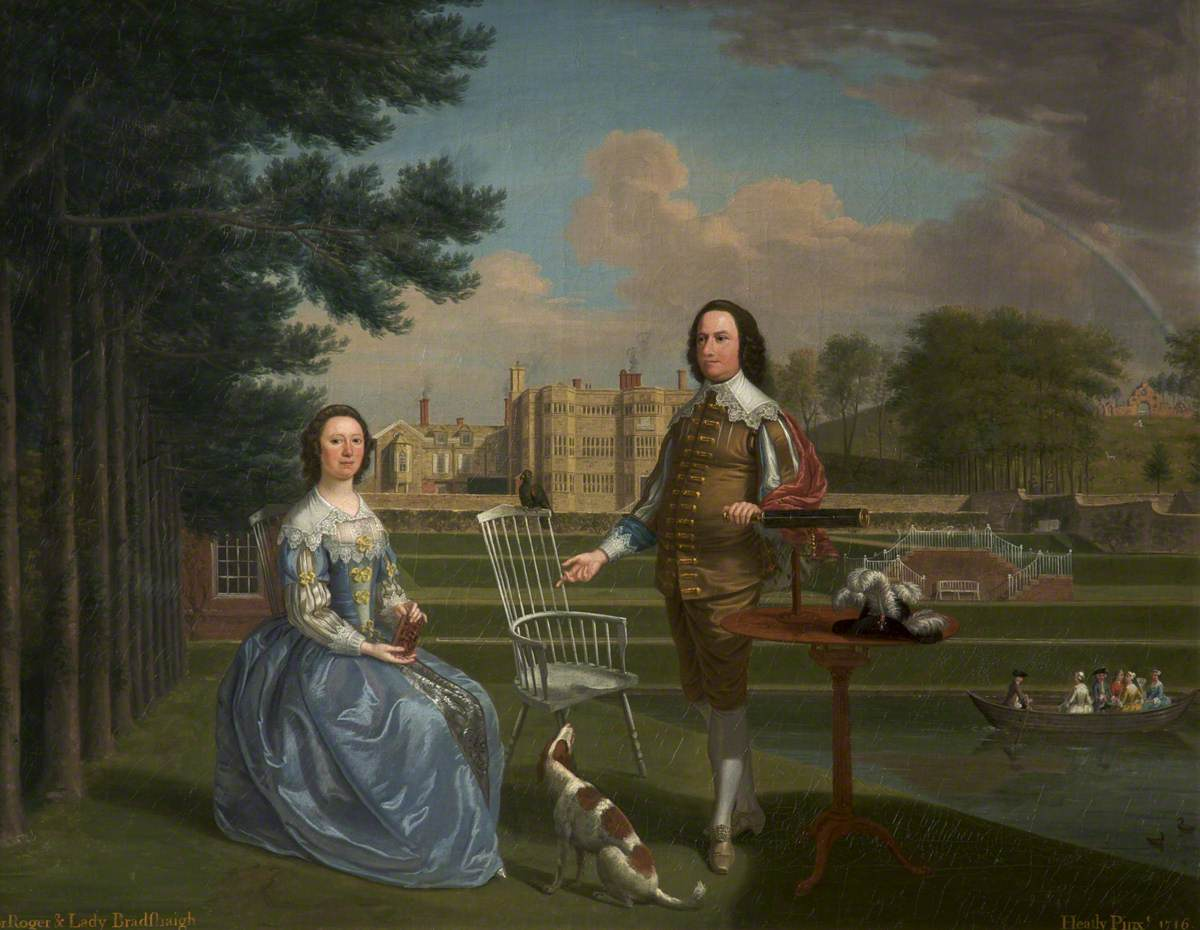
Haigh Hall, Sir Roger Bradshaigh Bt and Dorothy, Lady Bradshaigh by Edward Haytley (active 1740–1764)

Haigh had a timber framed manor house from the late 12th century when Hugh le Norreys was lord of the manor. Its easily defended position was on or near the elevated site of Haigh Hall. The earliest recorded inhabitants were the Le Norreyses, who lived there in 1193. Between 1220 and 1230, the manor was part of the Marsey fee and was sold to the Earl of Chester. The hall was home to the Bradshaighs from 1298 until 1780 when Elizabeth Dalrymple, great niece of Sir Roger Bradshaigh, inherited the estate as a result of the failure of the male line in her maternal family. Sir Roger had lived at the hall frugally from 1742. In 1745 the hall was occupied by the Jacobite Army. Another Sir Roger had married Dorothy Bradshaigh in 1731 and she was a noted correspondent of Samuel Richardson. Sir Roger died in 1770 and Dorothy died at Haigh in 1785.

Elizabeth Dalrymple married Alexander Lindsay, 6th Earl of Balcarres in 1787 and Haigh Hall became the seat of the Earls of Balcarres and, after 1848, the Earls of Crawford and Balcarres, for several generations. The Bradshaigh and Lindsay fortunes were made from seams of cannel and coal under the estate which were mined from before 1536. The Lindsays co-founded the Wigan Coal and Iron Company, alongside John Lancaster, (of the Kirkless Hall Coal and Iron Company) which became the largest such company on the Lancashire Coalfield.

The present hall was built between 1827 and 1840 by James Lindsay, 7th Earl of Balcarres, on the site of the ancient manor house. He designed and supervised the hall's construction whilst living in a cottage in the grounds. Hard sandstone for the facing was brought by canal from quarries at Parbold and dressed on site using steam-driven saws specially designed by the earl. Work started in 1827 on the north-east wing, and a year later on the south-west wing, which was completed by 1832. The entrance front replaced the 1720s brick building which was in use until the new south-east wing was started in 1836. It is possible the 18th-century building was refaced rather than completely rebuilt. The porch was added in 1844 in a different stone as Parbold stone was no longer available. Extensive tree planting took place on the estate to screen the house from the earl's collieries. The house was redecorated in 1873 at a cost of £80,000 for a visit of the Prince of Wales.

During the First and Second World Wars, the hall was used to provide care for injured soldiers. David Lindsay, the 11th Earl of Balcarres, was chairman of the Wigan Coal and Iron Company and its successor the Wigan Coal Corporation. The Earl said of himself that "he was publicly known as the premier Scots earl, whereas in reality, he was a Lancashire coal merchant". On one occasion he invited the other governors of the John Rylands Library to view an exhibition of the treasures of his library and a number of other professors of the Victoria University of Manchester were also present. Among these was the professor of commerce, George William Daniels, who paid the earl and countess the following compliment, "You know, it's worth five centuries of breeding to breed two like those". David Lindsay, 11th Earl of Balcarres sold the hall and grounds to Wigan Corporation in 1947 for £18,000 and moved to the family's original home at Balcarres House in Fife.

The hall is owned by Wigan Leisure and Culture Trust. In May 2016, the council entered into a partnership with Contessa Hotels and £6 million was spent to convert the hall into a hotel and spa. In 2019 however, Wigan Council took the decision to terminate the lease with Contessa Hotels after the firm failed to honour its terms.

In January 2023, it was announced that the hall had been granted money from the government's Levelling Up Fund. It will receive £20 million to create a "heritage destination of national significance", according to the council. The state of the hall has declined in recent years, but it is set for a £37.5 million transformation, with other funding coming from the council and the National Lottery Heritage Fund.

== Architecture ==
The five-storey hall has a square plan round a central light well and is built of brick faced with sandstone ashlar. The south-east entrance façade is symmetrical and has 11 bays, of which four project. The façade has a top cornice and parapet. At ground-floor level is a central half-glazed door and 10 tall casement windows, designed by the earl, which open from the inside and have a small upper sash. The first floor has eight tall 15-pane sash windows and above the porch, two shorter nine-pane sash windows and a central casement, while the second floor has 11 nine-pane sash windows. Over the door and adjacent windows is a Tuscan porch with paired columns at each end and columns either side of the door. The south-west garden front has seven bays with an ornamental cast-iron balcony at first-floor level. All the ironwork in the house was cast on the estate at the Haigh Foundry. The canted first, fifth and seventh bays are three storeys high with casements matching the ground floor of the front entrance. The north-east service wing has eight bays with three-storey canted bays at each end. There are two service entrances with round heads and fanlights with glazing bars. The rear of the house has 10 bays with casement windows to the ground floor and sashed windows on the floors above.

The interior is richly decorated, particularly the ceilings. The entrance hall has a coffered ceiling and palmette frieze and two black marble fireplaces. The stair hall is sail vaulted with a central light and the staircase has a cast-iron balustrade. The first floor library has a decorated ceiling. As the earl's collections expanded, the library took over several rooms, including the dining room, which was moved to the entrance hall.

The house was heated by hot air channelled through brass grilles in the skirting boards from seven stoves in the basement. Lighting was firstly by candles, although electricity and gas were installed in the 19th century.

Entrance lodges were constructed around the estate boundary and a gateway lodge was built on Wigan Lane around 1840. A stable block in red brick with yellow brick trim and Italianate tower with a pyramid roof was built north of the hall in 1865.

The hall has been registered in the National Heritage List for England as a designated Grade II* listed building since 19 November 1951.

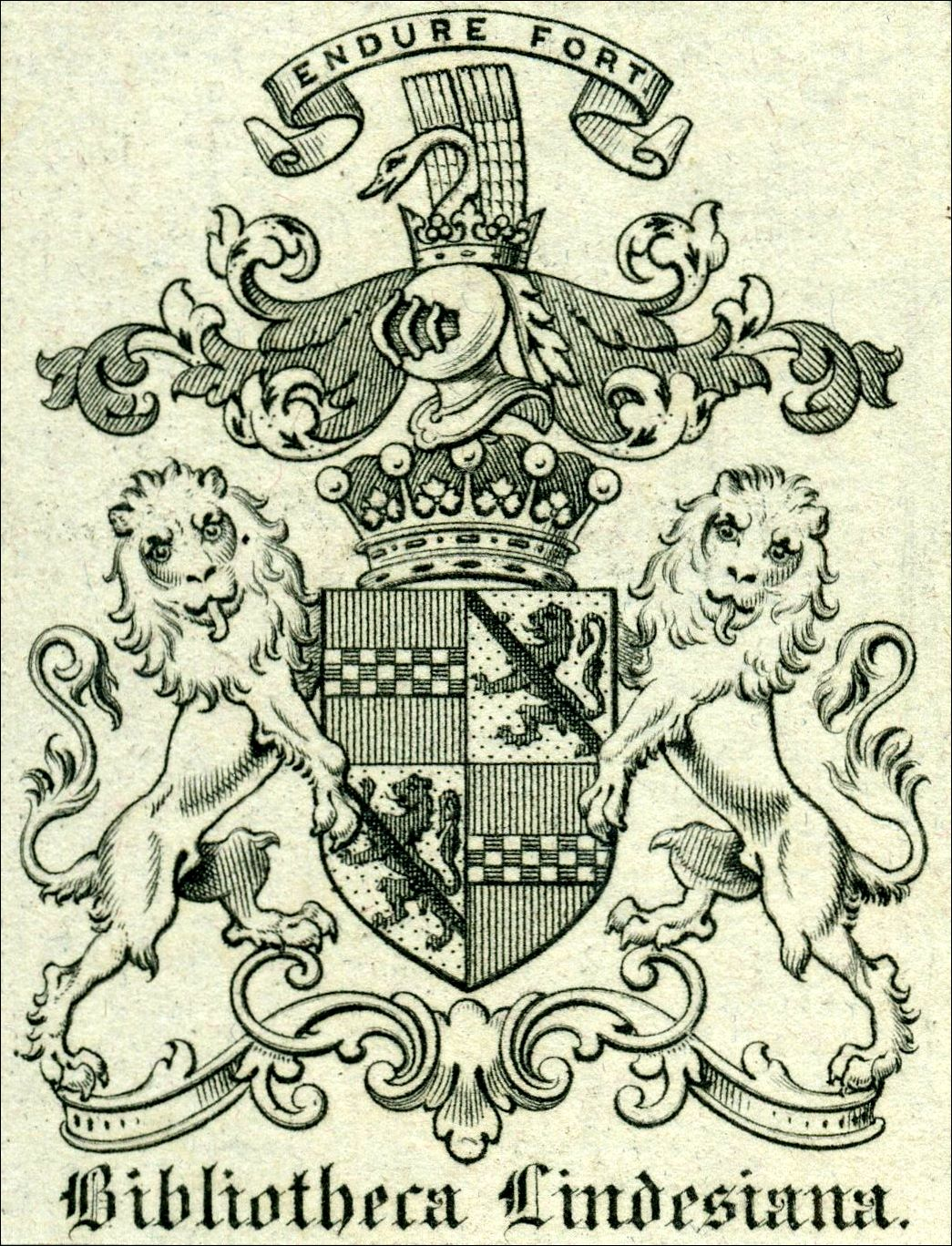
A book plate from the Bibliotheca Lindesiana.

== Bibliotheca Lindesiana ==
Housed on the first floor of the hall was the Lindsay family's library, the Bibliotheca Lindesiana, whose origins may go back to the late 16th century at Balcarres in Fife. Alexander Lindsay, 8th Earl of Balcarres (1812–1880) greatly expanded the collection which included a Gutenberg Bible. His son, James Lindsay, 26th Earl of Crawford, in collaboration with his father, enlarged the library and continued to do so after inheriting the titles so that it became one of the largest private collections in Britain. In 1901 he sold the collection of manuscripts (including Chinese and Japanese printed books) from the library to Enriqueta Augustina Rylands for the John Rylands Library. The Gutenberg Bible is part of the Harry Ransom Center collection at the University of Texas at Austin. The earl's extensive collection of philatelic literature, the Crawford Library, is now part of the British Library Philatelic Collections.

== Gardens ==
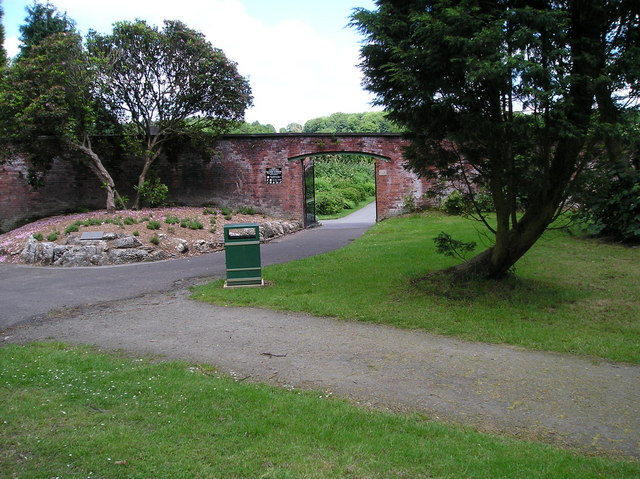
The entrance to the walled garden

Formal gardens established at the old hall in the early 18th century were illustrated in engravings by Knyff and Kip in 1707. A 1750 painting attributed to Joseph Highmore showed modifications to the layout including a "Gothic eye-catcher", the "Observatory" made entirely of cannel, on the hill crest to the east. Terraces, including a parterre with geometrical divisions extending outwards from the hall on the hillside to the south and west, were swept away by 19th-century landscaping carried out by the 8th Earl. Today the hall has a walled garden and woodland walks in the plantations which were part of the landscaping and extensive tree planting from the mid-19th century. Pathways were laid out in the plantations to provide work during the 1860s cotton famine. The plantations are mainly beech, with some other species, and form the largest area of woodland in Greater Manchester.

Within and around the Grade II listed parkland and pleasure grounds are several historic listed structures. On Wigan Lane is a pair of square ashlar lodges and a round-headed entrance arch in the Classical style probably built in 1840. The lodges are single-story with pyramidal roofs. The gateway arch has ornamental cast iron gates and a pendant lamp bracket suspended from the arch. Another stone lodge with a hipped roof on Hall Lane west of the canal dates from around 1830.

A railway bridge, with a cast iron balustrade from 1883 to 1884, over the Whelley Loop Line, which crosses the estate in a cutting, is Grade II listed as is the bridge over entrance to canal basin on the Leeds and Liverpool Canal.

== Haigh Country Park ==
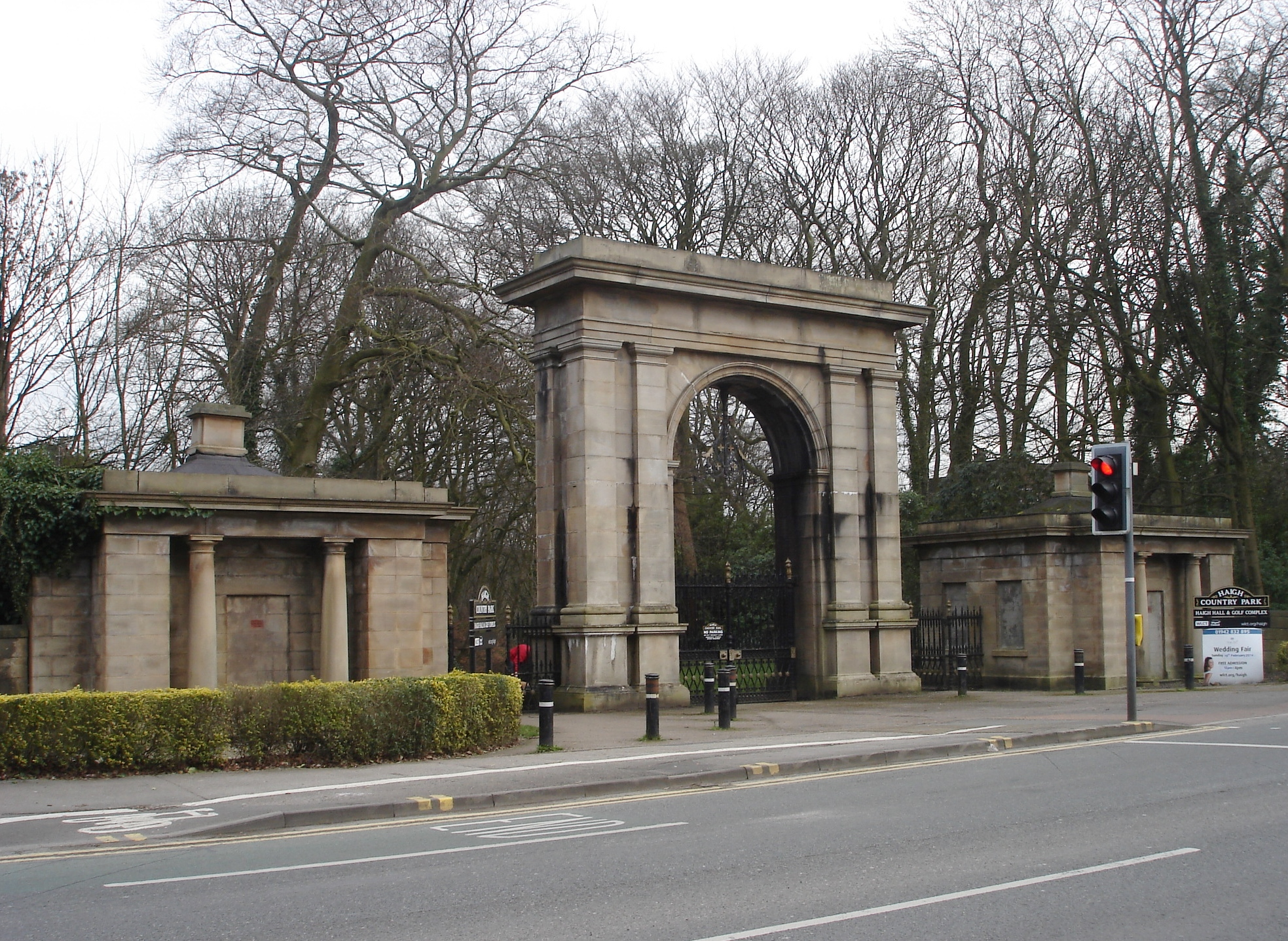
Entrance gates and lodges to Haigh Country Park

Parkland surrounding the hall now forms the Haigh Country Park and the Haigh Hall Golf Club. Although in the 1790s the park encompassed an area of 500 acres (200 ha), the area today is around 250 acres (100 ha).

The Great Haigh Sough, a 1,120 yards (1,020 m) tunnel to drain shallow coal pits, was driven under the estate between 1653 and 1670 by Sir Roger Bradshaigh. The estate was cut through by the southern portion of the Lancaster Canal, now part of the Leeds and Liverpool Canal, in 1799. The canal is crossed by several bridges within the park. The estate is bounded to the west by the River Douglas and to the east, the boundary is New Road.

The two-storey stable block of 1865 has been converted to the golf clubhouse and information center. It is built of red brick with stone and blue and yellow brick dressings. Its tower has round-headed windows and an opening for a clock face.

The Haigh Hall Miniature Railway, a 15-inch gauge railway, was opened in 1886, and at weekends runs around a one-mile (1.6 km) circuit through the woodland. The 3.5-inch and 5-inch gauge model steam railway is operated by Wigan Model Engineering Society on a one-third of a mile (0.54 km) track.

From 2002 to 2011 the park was the venue for the "Haigh Fest" music festival, which returned in 2017 after a six-year gap.

== See also ==
- Grade II* listed buildings in Greater Manchester
- Listed buildings in Haigh, Greater Manchester
