= Datestone =

Embedded stone with date carved into it

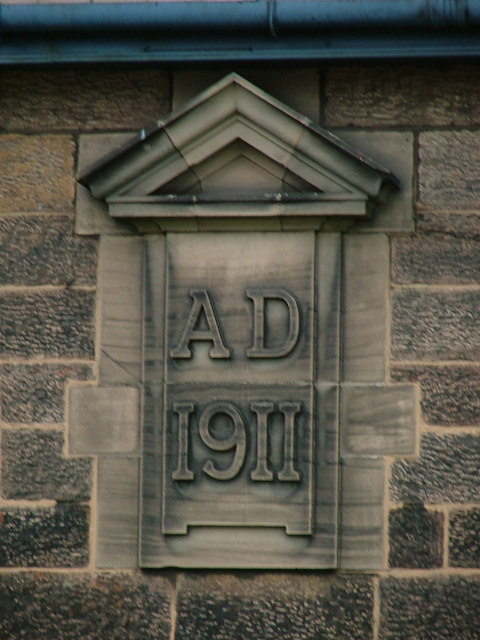
A datestone on Knypersley First School

A datestone is typically an embedded stone with the date of engraving and other information carved into it. They are not considered a very reliable source for dating a house, as instances of old houses being destroyed and rebuilt with the old date stones intact have been reported, or may in some cases be the date of a renovation or alteration.

Specific locations have often been chosen for datestones, viz.

- corbel
- gable stone
- gatepost – a large upright piece of (usually) granite, usually set at the entrance to a driveway or a field
- keystone
- lintel

== See also ==
- Marriage stone
- Cornerstone
