= Bedford, Greater Manchester =

One of three townships that merged to form Leigh, England

Coordinates: 53.4939°N 2.4996°W

Bedford
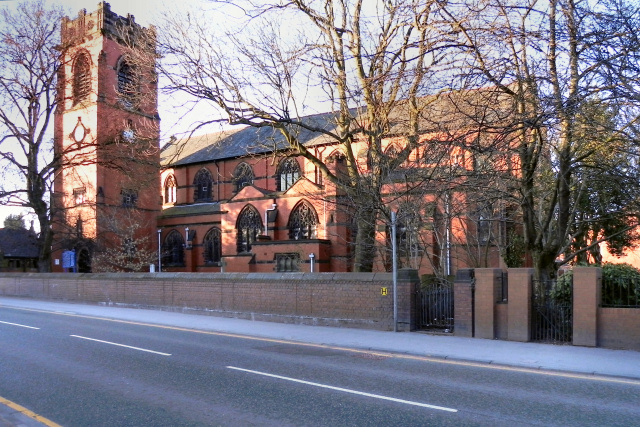
- The Parish Church of St Thomas with All Saints

- Location within Greater Manchester
- Metropolitan borough: Wigan
- Metropolitan county: Greater Manchester
- Region: North West
- Country: England
- Sovereign state: United Kingdom
- Post town: LEIGH
- Postcode district: WN7
- Dialling code: 01942
- Police: Greater Manchester
- Fire: Greater Manchester
- Ambulance: North West

Bedford is a suburb of Leigh, in the Wigan district, in the county of Greater Manchester, England. It was one of three ancient townships, Bedford, Pennington and Westleigh, that merged in 1875 to form the town of Leigh. Historically, Bedford was in Lancashire.

== History ==
=== Toponymy ===
Bedford means the "ford of Beda", which crossed Pennington Brook, probably near Beaston Bridge on Warrington Road. It was recorded as Beneford in 1200–21 and Bedeford in 1200 and 1296.

=== Manor ===
The manor, held by the Botelers of Warrington, was divided before the time when records survived. Bedford Hall never assumed the role of a manor house and was occupied by tenants of the Kighleys who were absentee landlords. In 1301 half of the manor was held by the Kighleys, a quarter by the Sales who lived at the moated Hopecarr Hall and the rest by John Waverton of Brick House. Thomas Shuttleworth lived at Sandypool which was taken from the Kighley share.

The area was rural and a small settlement grew at Butts where the road to Warrington branched from the Leigh to Manchester road. Several inns were built near the junction and in 1641 there was a shop selling "cheese, gunpowder, hops, tobacco and a variety of other goods". A corn mill was built by the Breaston Brook.

=== Industry ===
Agriculture, fustian weaving and mining from small coal pits near the Astley and Tyldesley border were the chief occupations until the Bridgewater Canal promoted the development of industry and rapid increases in population during the 19th century. Bedford Brewery was founded in 1823. Corn mills powered by steam were built at the canal basin by Butts Bridge in 1831 to process wheat imported from the prairies of America through the Port of Liverpool. Bickham and Pownall built a silk mill in Duke Street in 1833 and Richard le Mare, a French Huguenot immigrant, opened a silk weaving shed in Brewery Lane in 1859. After 1845 the Bedford Foundry made agricultural machinery and fire ranges in premises near the canal.

In 1858 the Fletchers built a private railway linking their collieries at Howe Bridge to Bedford Basin which the company built to facilitate the transport of coal. After the London and North Western Railway line was built in the north of the township, John Speakman sank Bedford Colliery where there was a disaster in 1886.

== Governance ==
Bedford
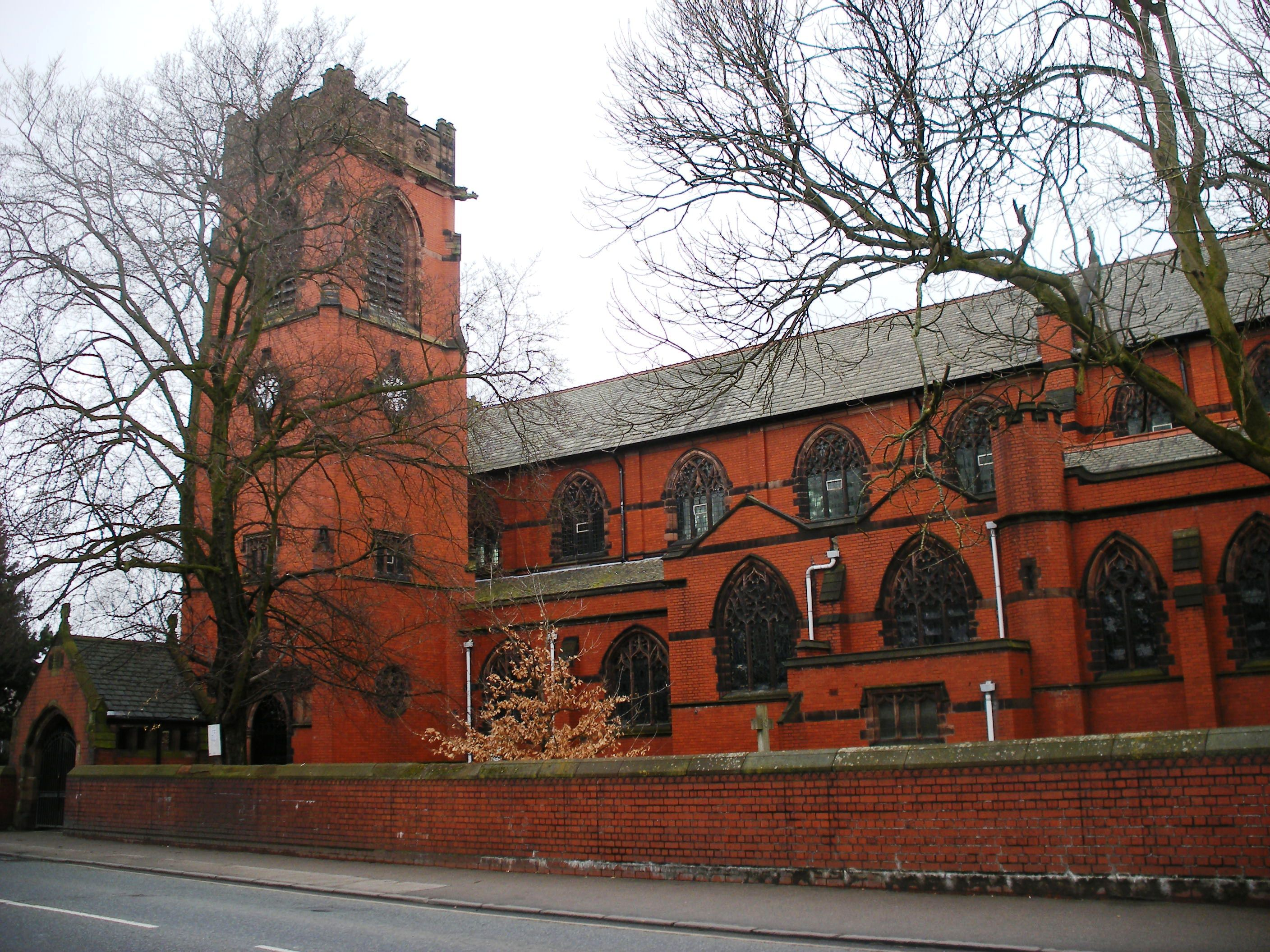
- St Thomas's Church
- History
  - Created: Middle Ages
  - Abolished: 1875
  - Succeeded by: Leigh Urban District
- Status: Township

Historically, Bedford was in the West Derby hundred, a judicial division of southwest Lancashire where the township was one of six vills that made up the ancient ecclesiastical parish of Leigh. The townships existed before the parish. Bedford was also a chapelry.

Under the terms of the Poor Law Amendment Act 1834 Bedford became part of the Leigh Poor Law Union, established on 26 January 1837 and responsible for an area covering the whole of the ancient parish and part of Winwick. The workhouses in Pennington, Culcheth, Tyldesley and Lowton were replaced by the Leigh Union workhouse at Atherleigh in the 1850s.

In 1866 Bedford became a separate civil parish, on 29 September 1894 the parish was abolished to form Leigh. In 1891 the parish had a population of 9455.

In 1875, the Leigh Local Board of Health was established, covering Bedford, Pennington and Westleigh. In 1894 the area of the Local Board, together with part of the Atherton township, became Leigh Urban District, which was granted honorific borough status in 1899 becoming the Municipal Borough of Leigh. In 1974 the borough was abolished by the Local Government Act 1972 and its former area transferred to Greater Manchester to be combined with others to form the Metropolitan Borough of Wigan.

== Geography ==
The township was crossed by four brooks from the north, west and east which united to the south of Bedford Hall to form the Glaze Brook forming part of the township's south western boundary. Astley and Bedford Mosses are a surviving part of Chat Moss where the elevation of the land is barely 50 feet above mean sea-level. The land rises gently to 125 feet on the northern boundary. The township had an area of 2,826 acres, and lay partly on the new red sandstone and to the north east on the middle coal measures of the Manchester Coalfield. There is alluvium in the ground crossed by the Glaze Brook and its tributaries. The soil is largely clay and the land consisted of meadow and pasture.

The mile-long Holden Road was constructed at a cost of £53,000 in 1923. In 1952 Leigh Borough Council began building a large council housing estate with facilities for 7,000 people at Higher Folds.

== Transport ==
The main road from Manchester to Leigh crosses the township from east to west and a road leading south to Warrington joins it at Butts Bridge. The A580 "East Lancashire" Road, which opened in 1934, crosses the township south of the Bridgewater Canal.

In 1864 the London and North Western Railway opened the Tyldesley Loopline from Manchester via Eccles and Tyldesley to Kenyon Junction on the Liverpool to Manchester Line via Leigh and Pennington. The station originally named Bedford Leigh served the town. The railway crossed the town on a viaduct which has since been largely demolished. The station and the railway closed in May 1969.

== Religion ==
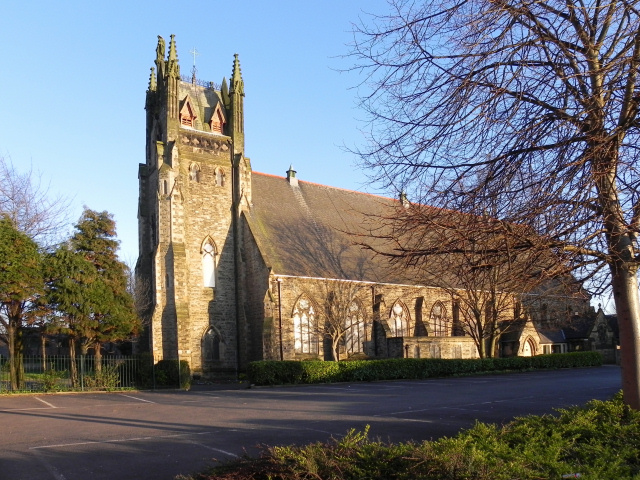
St Joseph's Roman Catholic Church

Recusants in Leigh adhered to the Catholic Church after the Reformation. They heard Mass in secret at Hopecarr, the home of the Sales or Hall House where the Jesuit fathers of Culcheth and Southworth served from the late-17th century. In 1778, before the relaxation of the penal laws against recusants, a chapel was built and public worship resumed. The chapel, from which Chapel Street was named, was replaced on the same site by St Joseph's Church designed by Joseph Hansom in 1855.

St Thomas's Church was built in 1840 but was replaced in the early-20th century by a new church on the old site. The church is built of Accrington brick with Runcorn red sandstone facings, it was designed by J. S. Crowther. A mission church dedicated to All Saints was built on Manchester Road and consecrated on 29 October 1938 by the Bishop of Manchester.

== See also ==
- List of mills in Wigan
- List of mining disasters in Lancashire
