= Christ Church, Pennington =

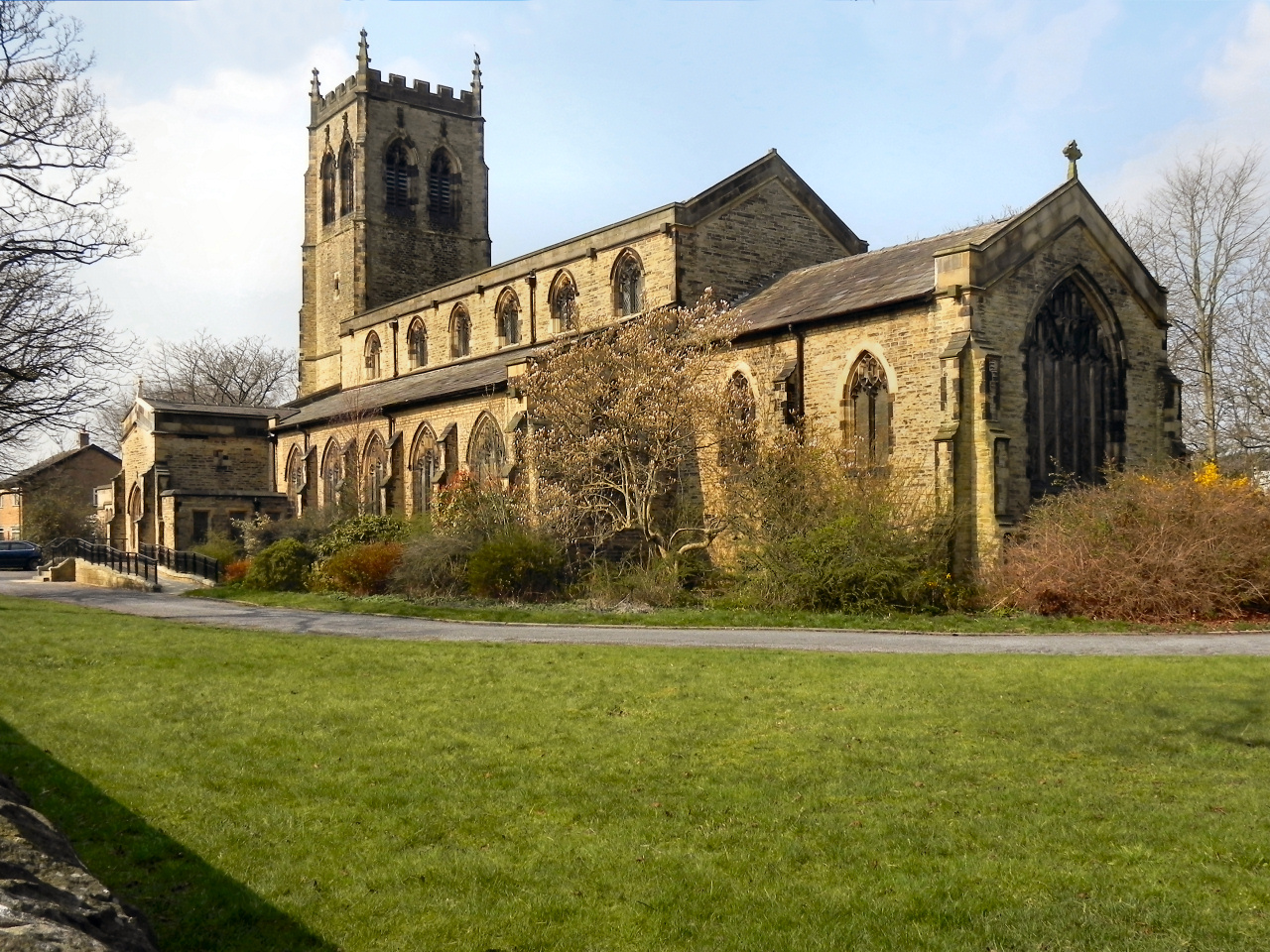
- Christ Church, Pennington
- 53.491°N 2.522°W
- Location: Schofield Street, Pennington, Leigh; Greater Manchester
- Country: England
- Denomination: Anglican
- Churchmanship: Charismatic Evangelical
- Website: Christ Church, Pennington

History
- Status: Parish church
- Founded: 1854

Architecture
- Functional status: Active
- Heritage designation: Grade II
- Designated: 27 July 1987
- Architect: E. H. Shellard
- Architectural type: Church
- Style: Gothic Revival
- Construction cost: £3,800

Specifications
- Capacity: 800
- Materials: Sandstone

Administration
- Province: York
- Diocese: Manchester

Christ Church (grid reference SJ653995) is an active Anglican parish church in Pennington, Leigh, Greater Manchester, England. Christ Church serves the parish of Pennington in the Leigh Deanery and Salford Archdeaconry in the Diocese of Manchester. It is a Grade II listed building.

== History ==
The parish was taken out of the ancient ecclesiastical parish of Leigh against the wishes of the vicar of Leigh Parish Church James Irvine. Irvine was opposed by his patron, Lord Lilford and many of his congregation including James Pownall the silk manufacturer. The vicar of St Stephen's Church, Astley, James Hewlett helped raise funds. The site, south of the Leeds and Liverpool Canal, cost £500 (£30,000 in 2014), the building, £3,800 (£260,000 in 2014), the churchyard fence and church furniture cost a further £500 (£30,000 in 2014).

== Architecture ==
The church was designed in the Gothic Revival style by E. H. Shellard and built in 1854 in hammer-dressed sandstone with ashlar dressings and a slate roof. Nikolaus Pevsner described it as a "Big, rather lifeless, church."

=== Exterior ===
Built on a projecting plinth, the church has a six-bay nave and two-bay chancel separated by buttresses. Its east and west gables have raked parapets with finials. There is a south porch. The bays have three-light windows while the clerestory and chancel have two-light windows. The east window has five lights. The castellated three-stage west tower has diagonal buttresses topped by crocketed pinnacles and a west door.

=== Interior ===
The double-chamfered nave arcade is supported on octagonal columns with moulded capitals. The west gallery has an arcaded parapet and below it a partition, constructed of wood and glass in the mid-20th century, separates the west end from the nave.

== See also ==
- List of churches in Greater Manchester
- Listed buildings in Leigh, Greater Manchester
