= Bedford Colliery =

Coal mine on the Manchester Coalfield in Bedford, Leigh, Lancashire, England

Coordinates: 53.504°N 2.497°W

Bedford Colliery, also known as Wood End Pit, was a coal mine on the Manchester Coalfield in Bedford, Leigh, Lancashire, England. The colliery was owned by John Speakman, who started sinking two shafts on land at Wood End Farm in the northeast part of Bedford, south of the London and North Western Railway's Tyldesley Loopline in about 1874. Speakman's father owned Priestners, Bankfield, and Broadoak collieries in Westleigh. Bedford Colliery remained in the possession of the Speakman family until it was amalgamated with Manchester Collieries in 1929.

== Geology ==
Bedford Colliery exploited the Middle Coal Measures which were laid down in the Carboniferous period and where coal is mined from seams between the Worsley Four Foot and Arley mines. (Note: In this part of Lancashire a coal seam is referred to as a mine and the coal mine as a colliery or pit.) The seams generally dip towards the south and west and are affected by small faults. The Upper Coal Measures are not worked in this part of the coalfield.

== History ==
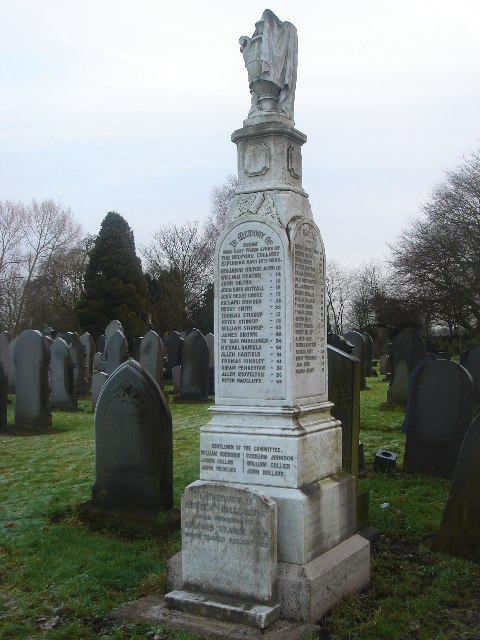
Bedford Colliery monument

Bedford was a rural community until the arrival of the Bridgewater Canal; a large basin built at Butts in 1795 proved to be a catalyst for the development of industry in the township. Coal however had been got from small pits in the northeast of the township. Wood End Farm was an area of Bedford with many old small coal pits including Milner's Pit which was working in 1853.

John Speakman began sinking two shafts south of the railway line in 1874, and by 1876 coal was being produced. The shafts were 197 yards (180 m) deep and reached the Crombouke mine. In 1883 No. 2 shaft was deepened to 420 yards (380 m) to access the Seven Foot mine and to 627 yards (573 m) to access the Trencherbone mine. Three years later No. 1 shaft was deepened to reach the Arley mine, at 891 yards (815 m).

Speakman's Sidings between Tyldesley Station and Bedford Leigh Station were provided after 1882. Speakman's built a private mineral railway line about a half mile in length to Guest Street, where there was a landsale yard and from where coal was sent to Bedford Mill. The line served a brickyard and smokeless fuel plant. In 1896 Bedford Colliery employed 366 men underground and 108 surface workers. Household and manufacturing coal was got from the Crumbouke, Six and Seven Foot mines. Speakmans sank No. 3 pit between 1913 and 1916.

After 1929 the colliery became part of Manchester Collieries and its railway was connected to the Astley and Tyldesley Collieries railway system between Nook and Gin Pit collieries. Manchester Collieries made improvements including new headgear and screens. The colliery became part of the National Coal Board in 1947. It closed in 1967 having employed 518 underground and 131 surface workers.

== Disaster ==
The Bedford Colliery Disaster occurred on Friday 13 August 1886, when an explosion of firedamp killed 38 men and boys. There is a memorial in Leigh Cemetery.

== Locomotives ==
The Speakmans bought a 0-6-0 saddle tank locomotive about which little is known; it may have been built by Andrew Barclay of Kilmarnock. This engine was replaced by a 4-coupled saddletank The Sirdar from the Vulcan Foundry at Newton le Willows. In 1910 the company acquired Bedford a 0-6-0 side tank built in 1865 by Manning Wardle of Leeds.

== See also ==
- List of mining disasters in Lancashire
- Glossary of coal mining terminology
