= Bedford Colliery disaster =

1886 coal mining disaster

Coordinates: 53.504°N 2.497°W

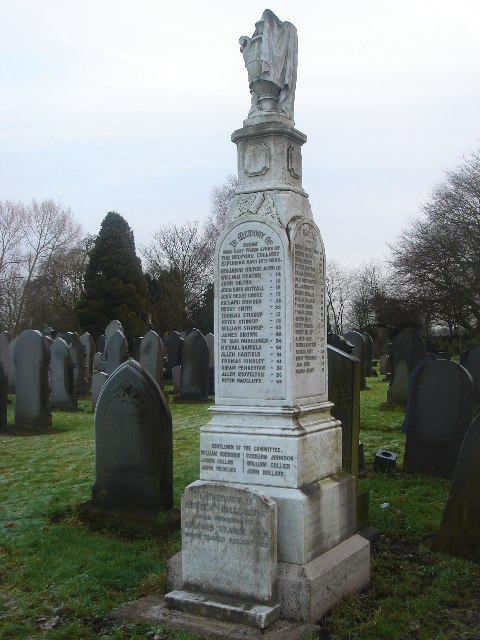
Bedford Colliery monument

The Bedford Colliery disaster occurred on Friday 13 August 1886 when an explosion of firedamp caused the death of 38 miners at Bedford No.2 Pit, at Bedford, Leigh in what then was Lancashire. The colliery, sunk in 1884 and known to be a "fiery pit", was owned by John Speakman.

== Explosion ==
On the day of the disaster 159 men and boys were underground working a shift that started at 6.00 a.m. and would have ended mid afternoon. The disaster took place at about 10.45a.m. in the Crombouke mine (seam) at a depth of about 530 yards and 700 yards from the pit-eye (shaft bottom). The miners in other areas of the pit were wound to the surface. One man working at the seat of the explosion, John Woolley a "dataller", (day wage man) survived and, though burned, managed to get to the bottom of the shaft. When the alarm was raised, the pit manager W. Horrobin, underlooker James Calland and the mine owner's son, Harry Speakman led a rescue party to investigate but were impeded by the presence of afterdamp. According to Calland the afterdamp was "very strong and makes the men very dizzy. When they have this feeling they have to come up quickly to the fresh air". The Mines Inspector, Joseph Dickinson of Pendleton was contacted by telegraph.

The explosion occurred before the formation of mines rescue teams but assistance arrived from nearby collieries and an exploring party of men from Bickershaw Colliery, Astley and Tyldesley Collieries and the Wigan Coal and Iron Company went underground but considered there would be no survivors. The underground fires were eventually extinguished and bodies brought to the surface.

== Aftermath ==
News of the explosion travelled quickly, by 11 a.m. a crowd of women had arrived at the pit and in the evening a crowd estimated to be between eight and ten thousand had gathered at the pit head. The burned and mutilated bodies were wrapped in tarpaulins and taken to the wheelwrights shop and the joiners shop was used as a mortuary. The youngest victim was 15 years old and the oldest 65. The average age of those who died was 32 and 48 children were left fatherless. Some families lost more than one member.

The colliery subscribed to the Lancashire and Cheshire Miners' Permanent Relief Society whose officials attended at the colliery. A committee of local dignitaries was formed to raise monies for the "Relief of Widows, orphans and others placed in distress by the explosion" and an appeal advertised in The Times newspaper.

=== Inquest ===
The coroner's inquest was not heard until 23 September 1886 so that John Woolley, who had survived the explosion, could give evidence. The coalface where the explosion occurred was being worked on the retreating principle. Headings had been driven into the coal and a working face established between them. As the coal was worked back along the headings, waste material accumulated in the goaf (or gob) behind it. Pit props were progressively removed and the roof was allowed to subside into the goaf a short distance behind the working face. Woolley was removing pit props when the fracturing roof released firedamp. The flame in Woolley's Davy lamp turned blue indicating explosive gas. Instead of reporting it, work continued. A few minutes later the flame in the lamp of a nearby miner "fired". Established procedure was "lowering his lamp to the floor [firedamp is lighter than air] and taking it steadily into the fresh air, avoiding jerks". Instead the miner shook it and attempted to blow it out at which point the flame passed through the gauze and caused the explosion.

The verdict of the coroner's jury was accidental death caused by an explosion of firedamp. The coroner commented that the fireman should spend more time examining the workings before the men went down the pit and that greater care should be taken examining the lamps. It was regretted that the gas was not reported by the prop-takers.

Subsequently, the colliery owners bought 150 Masault lamps and 50 improved Clanny lamps which had bonnets fitted. The effect of the bonnet was to protect the gauze from draughts and reduce the risk of the flame passing through.

== See also ==
List of mining disasters in Lancashire

- Glossary of coal mining terminology
