= Anne Jackson (disambiguation) =

Anne Jackson (1926–2016) was an American actress.

Anne or Ann Jackson may also refer to:

- Anne Constance Jackson (1889–1928), British amateur ornithologist
- Anne Cluysenaar (1936–2014), Belgian-born poet with married name Anne Jackson
- Anne Jackson (author) (born 1980), American author
- Ann Fletcher Jackson (1833–1903), New Zealand quaker evangelist
- Ann Maria Jackson (1810–1880), enslaved woman who escaped along the Underground Railroad

== See also ==
- Annie Jackson (disambiguation)
- Jackson (name)
