= Glaze Brook =

River in northwest England

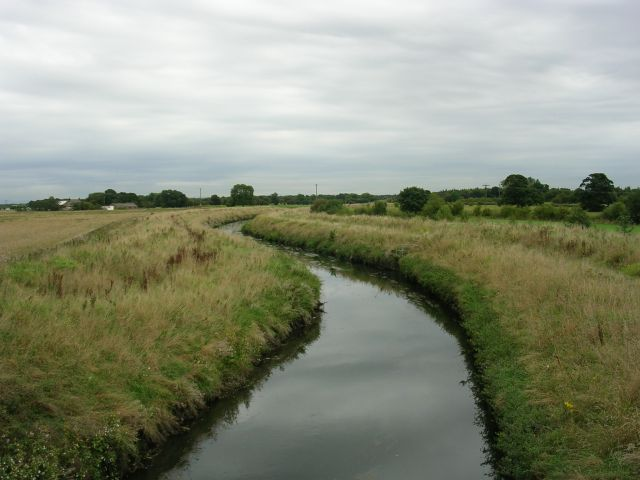
- Glaze Brook

Location
- Country: England
- Region: North West England
- District: Wigan, Greater Manchester, Warrington, Cheshire

Physical characteristics
- Source
  - location: Confluence of Pennington / Moss brooks
- Mouth
  - location: River Mersey
- Length: 35 km (22 mi)

Glaze Brook is a minor river in the River Mersey catchment area, England. From Leigh, Greater Manchester to the River Mersey it forms the county boundary with Cheshire. It is 22 miles (35 km) long and its main tributaries are the Astley, Bedford, Hey, Pennington, Shaw and Westleigh Brooks.

Pennington Brook starts at the outflow of Pennington Flash 53°29′06″N 2°32′07″W close to Aspull Common. Pennington Flash is fed by Hey Brook, a continuation of Borsdane Brook, which runs southwards from Blackrod.

Glaze Brook originates at the confluence of Pennington Brook and Moss Brook, north of Hawkhurst Bridge. After picking up the waters of Bedford Brook, which runs southward from Leigh and the Black or Moss Brook coming west from Worsley via Chat Moss, the brook turns southward, ultimately draining into the River Mersey section of the Manchester Ship Canal near Cadishead.

The catchment drains the flat lowland around Leigh which reaches a maximum altitude of 158 mAOD. The brook flows through largely agricultural land. Its tributaries extend into former mining and industrial areas in which mining subsidence has created flashes (lakes) at Pennington and Westleigh. The underlying geology is the sandstone and coal measures of the Lancashire Coalfield.

== Tributaries ==
- Willow Brook
- Jibcroft Brook
  - Twiss Brook (culverted)
- Carr Brook
- Black/Moss Brook
  - Bedford Brook
    - Lilford Park Brook
      - Atherton Lake Brook
        - Atherton Brook
          - Collier Brook
        - Hindsford Brook
          - Shakerley Brook
            - Old Mill Brook
              - Cutacre Brook
          - Chanters Brook
            - Carr Brook
    - Pen Leach Brook
  - Town Brook
    - Astley Brook
      - Elennor Brook
        - Honksford Brook
  - Whitehead Brook
    - Stirrup Brook
      - Ellen Brook
  - Shaw Brook
- Pennington Brook
  - Hey Brook
    - Westleigh Brook
      - Small Brook
      - Marsh Brook
        - Cunningham Brook
          - Pennington Brook
      - Hall Lee Brook
    - Windy Bank Brook
    - Nan Holes Brook
    - Coffin Lane Brook
    - Borsdane Brook
      - Dog Pool Brook
