= Bedford Hall =

Late-medieval house in Greater Manchester, England

General information
- Address: Bedford, Leigh, Greater Manchester, England
- Coordinates: 53.4861°N 2.4924°W
- Year(s) built: Late-medieval

Technical details
- Material: English bond brick, graduated stone, slate
- Floor count: 2 (with attic)
- Designations

Listed Building – Grade II
- Official name: Bedford Hall
- Designated: 7 November 1966
- Reference no.: 1356220

Bedford Hall is a late-medieval house in Bedford, Leigh, Greater Manchester, England. It was leased to tenants by the Kighleys, absent lords of the manor of Bedford, and has been modified several times over the centuries becoming a farmhouse and now two houses. It was one of a group of timber-framed medieval halls, including Morleys Hall in Astley, located to the north of Chat Moss. It is a Grade II listed building.

In 1291 the hall was in the possession of Adam de Sale who held it from the de Kighleys. In 1303 William de la Doune was accused of demolishing the hall which had two chambers and another for esquires which he said was ruinous and unroofed. With the permission of the Kighleys a new hall with two chambers and a kitchen was built.

The Historic England listing states "It is one of a significant group of medieval halls on the rural hinterland of Leigh including the nearby Sandy Pool Farm, Hopecarr Hall (now demolished), and Peel Hall at Ince, Morley's Hall at Astley and Kirklees Hall at Aspull .... Along with nearby Sandy Pool Farm, Morley's Hall, Peel Hall and Kirklees Hall it survives as one of a significant group of timber-framed medieval halls located on the rural hinterlands of Leigh."

== See also ==
- Listed buildings in Leigh, Greater Manchester
