= Municipal Borough of Leigh =

Former local government area in the UK

Coordinates: 53°30′N 2°31′W

Leigh
- Area
  - 1911: 6,359 acres
  - 1961: 6,359 acres
- Population
  - 1901: 40,001
  - 1971: 46,188
- History
  - Created: 1894
  - Abolished: 1974
  - Succeeded by: Metropolitan Borough of Wigan
- Status: Urban district (until 1899); Municipal borough (after 1899)

The Municipal Borough of Leigh was, from 1899 to 1974, a local government district of the administrative county of Lancashire, England, consisting of the townships of Pennington, Westleigh, Bedford and part of the township of Atherton and named after the ancient ecclesiastical parish. The area contained the market town of Leigh that served as its administrative centre until its dissolution in 1974. The borough council built Leigh Town Hall which was completed in 1907.

In 1875 Leigh Local Board of Health was formed comprising the areas Bedford, Pennington and Westleigh, members of the Leigh Poor Law Union. It was created an urban district in 1894 by the Local Government Act 1894 and was incorporated as a municipal borough in 1899. It was affected by a minor boundary change with Golborne Urban District in 1969 which affected no population.

In 1974 the borough was abolished by the Local Government Act 1972 and its former area transferred to Greater Manchester to be combined with others to form the Metropolitan Borough of Wigan.

From 1894 to 1933, Leigh Rural District located (in two fragments) either side of the district, comprised the civil parishes of Astley, Culcheth, Kenyon and Lowton. The rural district was abolished in 1933 under a County Review Order.

Motto: 'AEQUO PEDE PROPERA' - Means to "Hasten steadily"
