= Annie Jackson =

Annie Jackson may refer to:

- Annie Hurlburt Jackson (1887–1959), American artist
- Annie May Jackson, first female police officer in Canada
- Annie Jackson-Camden, 7th Heaven character

== See also ==
- Anne Jackson (disambiguation)
- Jackson (name)
