= Roby Mill =

Coordinates: 53.558861°N 2.7292419°W

- Village
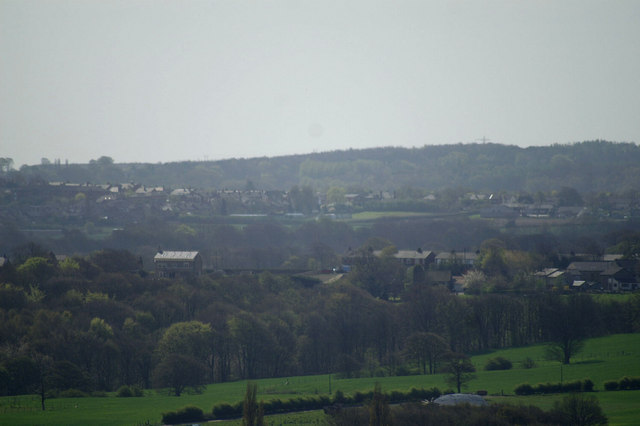
- Roby Mill as seen from Parbold

- Shown within West Lancashire Location within Lancashire
- Population: 405
- OS grid reference: SD5107
  - London: 174 mi (280 km) SE
- Civil parish: Up Holland
- District: West Lancashire
- Shire county: Lancashire
- Region: North West
- Country: England
- Sovereign state: United Kingdom
- Post town: Skelmersdale
- Postcode district: WN8
- Dialling code: 01695
- Police: Lancashire
- Fire: Lancashire
- Ambulance: North West
- UK Parliament: West Lancashire

Roby Mill is a village in the West Lancashire district of Lancashire, England. The estimated population is 405.

== Geography and Politics ==
Roby Mill is located in the West Lancashire district of Lancashire, and the civil parish of Up Holland, formerly part of the unparished area of Skelmersdale. It is located approximately 6.5 miles (10.5 km) east of Ormskirk town centre, the administrative centre for West Lancashire, 2 miles (3.2 km) east of Skelmersdale town centre, 13.7 miles (22.0 km) south of Preston city centre, the administrative centre of Lancashire and 182.2 miles (293.2 km) north-west of London.

It falls under West Lancashire Borough Council and Lancashire County Council, both of which are responsible for the administration of various services in the area. It is located in the Wrightington ward of West Lancashire Borough Council, where it is represented by two Conservative Party councillors and in the Skelmersdale North ward of Lancashire County Council, where it is represented by one Labour Party councillor.

It is in the West Lancashire parliamentary constituency, which has been represented by Labour Party MPs since the 1992 general election, namely Colin Pickthall, Rosie Cooper, and since 2023 Ashley Dalton.

== Transport ==
The B5375 road runs through the village, connecting the town to Appley Bridge approximately 2 miles (3.2 km) to the north, and to Up Holland approximately 1.2 miles (1.9 km) to the south.

Preston Bus operates the 311 service which runs through the village, connecting Ormskirk bus station to Wrightington Hospital.

== Education ==
The village is served by one Church of England primary school.
