= Parsonage Colliery =

Coal mine in England

Coordinates: 53.5004°N 2.5273°W

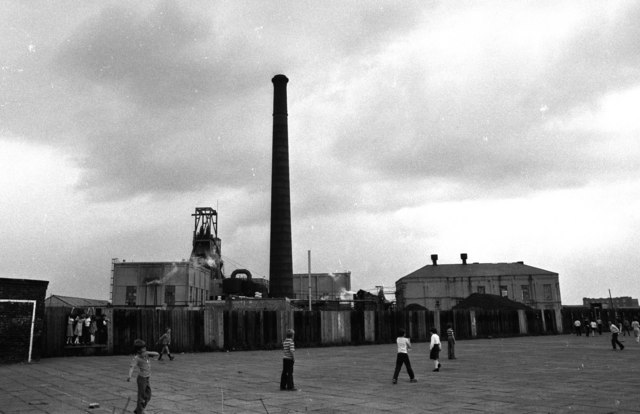
Parsonage Colliery in 1980

Parsonage Colliery was a coal mine operating on the Lancashire Coalfield in Leigh, then in the historic county of Lancashire, England. The colliery, close to the centre of Leigh and the Bolton and Leigh Railway was sunk between 1913 and 1920 by the Wigan Coal and Iron Company and the first coal was wound to the surface in 1921. For many years its shafts to the Arley mine were the deepest in the country. The pit was close to the town centre and large pillars of coal were left under the parish church and the town's large cotton mills.

== History ==
Parsonage's two shafts were sunk to the Arley mine at 999 yards (913 m) and the depth including the sump was 1,008 yards (922 m) yards. They were 21 feet (6.4 m) in diameter and lined with brick. Sinking began in 1913 but was halted for two years in early 1914 because of the war. The colliery's winding houses were made of reinforced concrete and its headgear was 88 feet (27 m) tall with 18 feet (5.5 m) diameter pulley wheels. Markhams of Chesterfield supplied a winding engine with 40 inch diameter cylinders for the downcast shaft and W & J Galloway & Sons supplied the engine for the upcast shaft. Steam power was supplied by 12 Lancashire boilers. Walkers of Wigan supplied the 28 feet (8.5 m) diameter ventilation fan and engine. Ventilation was important; the temperature where the workings reached 4,500 feet (1,400 m) was 118 °F (48 °C).

In 1923 Parsonage Nos. 1 & 2 pits employed 85 underground and 75 surface workers. but by 1933 this had risen to 1,261 underground and 287 on the surface. From 1,044 tons of coal in 1921, output increased to 252,188 tons in 1925. The General Strike of 1926 closed the pit for 31 weeks and 172,787 tons were produced and by 1930 output was 325,000 tons. The coal was produced from four seams providing best quality house coal. It was sorted at the pithead at three sets of screens, one set 70 feet (21 m)long by 7 feet (2.1 m) wide could process 1,250 tons in seven hours.

The colliery became part of the National Coal Board in 1947 and subsequently it was linked underground to Golborne and Bickershaw collieries. It closed in early 1992 and the shaft was filled in with limestone mined in Carnforth, Lancashire then capped with a thick concrete plug. A supermarket was built on the site shortly after. In 2012 the first phase of the Parsonage Retail Park was opened on the site.
