= Higher Folds =

Housing estate in Wigan, Greater Manchester, England

Coordinates: 53.503355°N 2.4834000°W

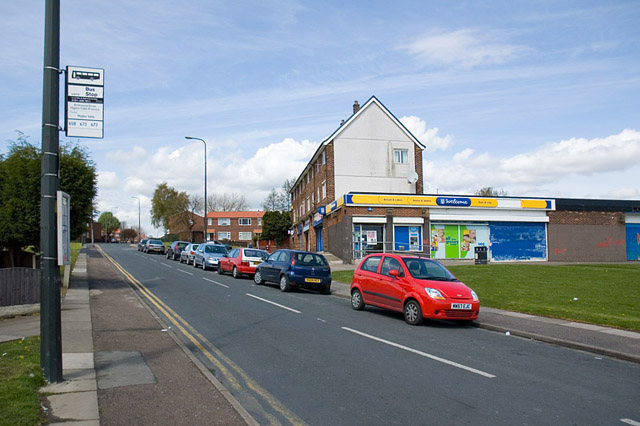
- Shops on Richmond Drive

- Location within Greater Manchester
- Area: 0.455 km^{2} (0.176 sq mi)
- Population: 2,770 (2018 estimate)
  - Density: 6,088/km^{2} (15,770/sq mi)
- Metropolitan borough: Wigan
- Metropolitan county: Greater Manchester
- Region: North West
- Country: England
- Sovereign state: United Kingdom
- Post town: LEIGH
- Postcode district: WN7
- Dialling code: 01942
- Police: Greater Manchester
- Fire: Greater Manchester
- Ambulance: North West

Higher Folds is a housing estate to the north-east of Leigh, in the Wigan district of Greater Manchester, England. It lies about 15 miles west of Manchester. In 2018 it had an estimated population of 2,770. Shaun Keaveny grew up in Higher Folds.

== Amenities ==
Higher Folds did have a church dedicated to St Gabriel, which was demolished and Richmond Park was built on the land. Another church located near the new development state called Walmsley Park, it was demolished in 1978 and what remains is a handrail and stones that lead to Walmsley

== History ==
Higherfolds was a small croft that consisted of farm lands and small industries that were located near Bedford village in the 1800s. This is the only croft under the "folds" naming convention in Bedford that remains.

Higher Folds estate was developed in the 1950s. In 2001 Higher Folds had the highest number of divorced people in England, in 2005 it ranked within the 8% most disadvantaged Super Output Areas in England.
