= Leigh Union workhouse =

Building in Atherton, England

Coordinates: 53°30′28″N 2°31′4″W

Leigh Union workhouse, also known as the Leigh workhouse and after 1930, Atherleigh Hospital, was a workhouse built in 1850 by the Leigh Poor Law Union on Leigh Road, Atherton in the historic county of Lancashire.

== Background ==
The Elizabethan Poor Law made the townships the unit of administration of the poor laws, and each appointed unpaid Overseers of the Poor to collect poor rates. Paupers were given cash or kind as outdoor relief. Workhouses were more common from the end of the 17th century and provided indoor relief. Pauper children, especially orphans, were often apprenticed to local craftsmen to learn a trade and ease the burden on the poor rates.

== Workhouses before 1837 ==
There were several small workhouses in the area of the Poor Law Union dating from the 18th century. The Pennington township had a workhouse in King Street, now Leigh town centre, from about 1739. It had stocks and a whipping post and served “as a prison for evildoers and a place for the unhappy poor”. Rules were strictly enforced and churchgoing was compulsory. In 1777 the churchwardens leased the workhouse to two "speculators", who ran it for a salary of £9 per annum, "five quarters of coal" from each township, 15d (6p) a week for each inmate and the profits from the labours of the poor. The speculators were to find food, drink, washing and accommodation, which encouraged exploitation and harsh conditions. Usually the workhouse had few inmates; there were five in 1792, but numbers increased from the time of the Napoleonic Wars. It was sold in 1822.

Atherton's workhouse was in Hag Fold and lasted until the Leigh Union was created.

Tyldesley had a workhouse after 1798 when the town started to grow rapidly. The governor's salary was £1 per month in 1798 and rose to £1 18s (£1.90) in 1808, the matron's wage was 8s (40p) a month in 1800. Inmates, unless incapacitated, had to work both outside and inside and the profit from their labour offset maintenance costs. The house had hand looms for weaving and some inmates were sent to work in the new cotton factories.

== The Poor Law Union ==
The Poor Law Amendment Act 1834 was passed to reform the way in which relief was given to the poor and resulted in the formation of Poor Law Unions across the country. Leigh Poor Law Union was established on 26 January 1837 in accordance with the Poor Law Amendment Act covering six townships, Astley, Atherton, Bedford, Pennington, Tyldesley with Shakerley and Westleigh of the ancient parish of Leigh plus Culcheth, Lowton, and part of Winwick. The population of the townships was about 26,000.

The Poor Law Union was run by a board of eighteen guardians, assisted by the overseers. A medical officer was appointed “to attend duly and punctually upon all paupers falling sick within the limits of the Union.” The overseers of the old poor law were retained and the new guardians included Richard Hodgkinson, Lord Lilford's agent and James Pownall, the silk manufacturer. The millowner, James Burton represented Tyldesley and was at one time chairman.

The Leigh Poor Law Union in 1837 used existing workhouses in Lowton and Culcheth. After 1840, numbers of inmates in the workhouse rarely exceeded 200 at any given time. The guardians report of 1840 found the inmates employed in cotton weaving and nailing.

The new union workhouse at Atherleigh on Leigh Road in Atherton was completed in 1855. The land was bought from Lord Lilford and cost £640. The red brick workhouse, described as a "fine Gothic building" cost £8,000. After 1930 it was used as a hospital and closed in 1990. It was demolished and the site is occupied by housing.

In 1840 the workhouse diet was adequate, consisting of "Breakfast: milk porridge (1 quart for adults; 3 gills for children 10 to 15 years; 1 pint for children under 10 years) and wheaten bread. Dinner: bacon, potatoes, bread, pea soup. Supper: 1 quart of meal porridge, 1 pint of butter milk. Special meals were provided on Christmas Day, such as in 1853, when the inmates received roast beef and plum pudding."
