= WN postcode area =

Postcode area within the United Kingdom

Wigan
- Postcode area
- Coordinates: 53.534°N 2.637°W
- Country: United Kingdom
- Postcode area: WN
- Postcode area name: Wigan
- Post towns: 3
- Postcode districts: 8
- Postcode sectors: 35
- Postcodes (live): 7,149
- Postcodes (total): 9,152
- Statistics as at May 2020

The WN postcode area, also known as the Wigan postcode area, is a group of eight postcode districts in North West England, within three post towns. These cover most of the Metropolitan Borough of Wigan in Greater Manchester (including Wigan itself and Leigh), plus small parts of West Lancashire (including Skelmersdale) and the Metropolitan Borough of St Helens in Merseyside.

Mail for the WN postcode area is processed at Warrington Mail Centre, along with mail for the CW, L and WA postcode areas.

== Coverage ==
The approximate coverage of the postcode districts:

Postcode district	Post town	Coverage	Local authority area(s)
WN1	WIGAN	Haigh, Ince, Swinley, Wigan	Wigan
WN2	WIGAN	Abram, Aspull, Bamfurlong, Bickershaw, Haigh, Hindley, Hindley Green, Ince, Platt Bridge	Wigan
WN3	WIGAN	Goose Green, Ince, Winstanley, Worsley Mesnes, Hawkley Hall	Wigan
WN4	WIGAN	Ashton-in-Makerfield, Garswood	Wigan, St Helens
WN5	WIGAN	Billinge, Newtown, Higher End, Orrell, Pemberton, Winstanley, Worsley Hall, Marsh Green.	Wigan, St Helens
WN6	WIGAN	Appley Bridge, Beech Hill, Shevington, Springfield, Standish, Wrightington	Wigan, West Lancashire
WN7	LEIGH	Leigh, Hope Carr, Landside, Low Common, Bedford, Westleigh, Pennington, Higher Folds	Wigan
WN8	WIGAN	Dalton, Newburgh, Parbold	West Lancashire
WN8	SKELMERSDALE	Chapel House, Holland Moor, Roby Mill, Skelmersdale, Up Holland	West Lancashire

== Map ==
WN postcode area map, showing postcode districts in red and post towns in grey text, with links to nearby BL, L, M, PR and WA postcode areas.

== See also ==
- Postcode Address File
- List of postcode areas in the United Kingdom
