= Leigh, Greater Manchester =

Town in Greater Manchester, England

Coordinates: 53.4975°N 2.5150°W

Leigh
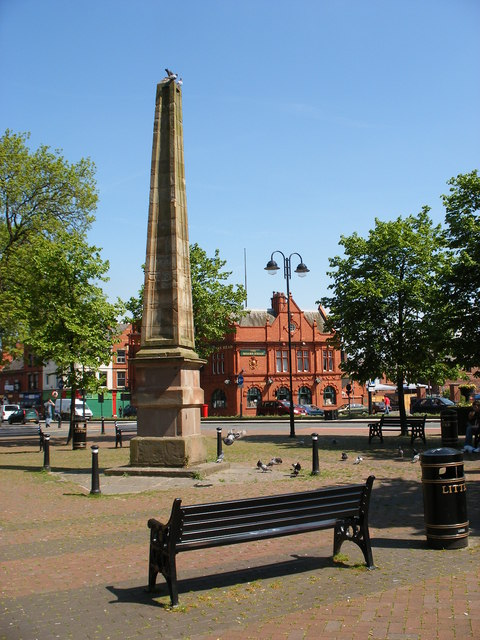
- Obelisk in town centre

- Location within Greater Manchester
- Population: 53,000 (2011)
- OS grid reference: SD655005
  - London: 169 mi (272 km) SSE
- Metropolitan borough: Wigan
- Metropolitan county: Greater Manchester
- Region: North West
- Country: England
- Sovereign state: United Kingdom
- Post town: LEIGH
- Postcode district: WN7
- Dialling code: 01942
- Police: Greater Manchester
- Fire: Greater Manchester
- Ambulance: North West
- UK Parliament: Leigh and Atherton

Leigh is an ancient parish in the Metropolitan Borough of Wigan, in Greater Manchester, England, on low-lying land northwest of Chat Moss. It is situated approximately 6 miles (9.7 km) southeast of Wigan and 11 miles (18 km) west of Manchester city centre. In 2011 it had a population of 53,000.

Within the boundaries of the historic county of Lancashire, Leigh was originally the centre of a large ecclesiastical parish covering six vills or townships. When the three townships of Pennington, Westleigh and Bedford merged in 1875, forming the Leigh Local Board District, Leigh became the official name for the town, although it had been applied to the area of Pennington and Westleigh around the parish church for many centuries. The town became an urban district in 1894 when part of Atherton was added. In 1899 Leigh became a municipal borough. The first town hall was built on King Street and replaced by the present building in 1907.

Originally an agricultural area (noted for dairy farming), domestic spinning and weaving led to a considerable silk industry and, in the 20th century, the cotton industry. Leigh also exploited the underlying coal measures, particularly after the town was connected to the canals and railways. Leigh had an important engineering base. The legacy of Leigh's industrial past can be seen in the remaining red brick mills – some of which are listed buildings– although it is now a mainly residential town, with Edwardian and Victorian terraced housing packed around the town centre. Leigh's present-day economy is based largely on the retail sector.

== History ==
=== Toponymy ===
Leigh is derived from the Old English leah which meant a place at the wood or woodland clearing, a glade and subsequently a pasture or meadow, it was spelt Legh in 1276. Other recorded spellings include Leech, 1264; Leeche, 1268; Leghthe, 1305; Leght, 1417; Lech, 1451; Legh, 16th century. As its name denotes it was a district rich in meadow and pasture land, and the produce of its dairies, the Leigh cheese, was formerly noted for its excellence. Westleigh, the west clearing, was Westeley in 1237, Westlegh in 1238 and Westlay in Legh in 1292. Pennington was recorded as Pininton and Pynynton in 1246 and 1360, Penynton in 1305, Pynyngton in 1351 and 1442 and Penyngton in 1443, the ending tun denotes an enclosure, farmstead or manor in Old English. The ford of Beda, probably through the Pennington Brook gave its name to Bedford which was recorded as Beneford from 1200 to 1221 and Bedeford in 1200 and 1296.

=== Early history ===
The earliest signs of human activity in Leigh are evidenced by a Neolithic stone axe found in Pennington and a bronze spearhead from south of Gas Street. A single Roman coin was found at Butts in Bedford. After the Roman departure from Britain, and into the history of Anglo-Saxon England, nothing was written about Leigh. However, evidence for the presence of Saxons in what was a sparsely populated and isolated part of the country is provided by local township place names that incorporate the Old English suffix leah, such as Leigh, Tyldesley, Shakerley and Astley.

=== Townships ===
In the 12th century the ancient parish of Leigh was made up of six townships, including Pennington, Bedford, Westleigh, Atherton, Astley, and Tyldesley cum Shakerley. Weekly markets were held by the parish church and a cattle fair held twice-yearly.

The land to the south of Atherton includes the feudal barony of Atherleigh, created by Queen Elizabeth, and Bedford manor, which was mentioned in documents in 1202 when it was held by Sir Henry de Kighley whose family held it until the 16th century, but never actually lived there. The Shuttleworths, landowners from the 14th century, were another prominent Bedford family. Richard Shuttleworth married a daughter of the Urmstons from Westleigh and brought part of the Westleigh inheritance to Bedford. This family lived at Shuttleworth House, or Sandypool Farm as it is also known, which is south of the Bridgewater Canal near to the old manor house, Bedford Hall, which survives today as a Grade II listed building. Another prominent Bedford family, the Sales of Hope Carr Hall, had a great deal of influence in Bedford for over 400 years, and owned more land than the Shuttleworths. The family were recusants and secretly kept the "old faith" when Roman Catholicism was subject to civil or criminal penalties. Hope Carr Hall was moated as was nearby Brick House.

The manor house of Westleigh was at Higher Hall and existed in Richard I's time (1189–1199). In 1292 Sigreda, the heiress of the manor, married Richard de Urmston, and the manor passed to the Urmston family and remained there until the last of the male Urmstons died in 1659. It was later abandoned because of mining subsidence and Westleigh Old Hall became the manor by repute. The Ranicars and the Marsh families lived here. Westleigh Old Hall was another Leigh hall that had a moat.

The Pennington family owned Pennington Hall from about 1200 until they were replaced by the Bradshaw or Bradshaighs in 1312. The Bradshaws held the manor until 1703 when John, the last of the male line died. Pennington Hall was rebuilt in 1748 by the then-owner Samuel Hilton and in 1807 sold to the Gaskell family of Thornes, Wakefield, who let it to a succession of tenants. Around 1840 James Pownall, a founder member of the silk manufacturing firm, Bickham and Pownall, was a tenant. Later occupants were Charles Jackson, a cotton manufacturer, Jabez Johnson, and F.W. Bouth founder of Bouth's Mill in 1862, The last resident was the brewer George Shaw. On 3 December 1919 George Shaw & Co Ltd offered the hall and grounds to the people of Leigh. The gift was accepted and opened to the public on 25 August 1920. The hall was converted to a museum and art gallery in 1928 but was demolished in 1963. The grounds are now Pennington Park.

=== Civil War ===
Leigh was divided in its allegiance during the English Civil War, some of the population supporting the Royalists' cause while others supported the Parliamentarians. A battle was fought in the town on 2 December 1642, when a group of Chowbenters, men from neighbouring Atherton, beat back and then routed Cavalier troops under the command of James Stanley, the 7th Earl of Derby. Sir Thomas Tyldesley of Myerscough and Morleys Hall, Astley, was killed on 25 August 1651 at the Battle of Wigan Lane and is buried in the Tyldesley Chapel in Leigh Parish Church. The Earl of Derby passed through Leigh again in 1651, when he spent his last night in the King's Arms, before going on to his execution outside Ye Olde Man & Scythe Inn in Bolton.

=== Industrial Revolution ===
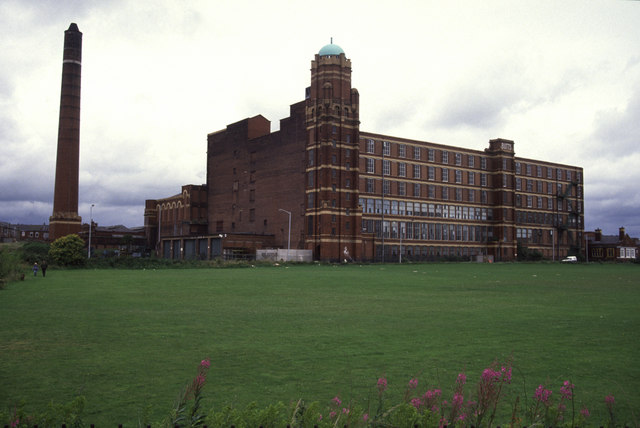
Butts Mill, Leigh

At the end of the 16th century, although agriculture and the dairy industry, particularly the production of Leigh cheese, sometimes known as Leigh Toaster, were important, spinning and weaving began to develop as a cottage industry. Work was supplied from Manchester by agents who brought work weekly often to an inn, and where they collected the finished cloth. At first, the work was done to supplement the income of local farmers and their families. The cloth woven in Leigh was fustian, a sort of rough corduroy, and by the end of the 17th-century middlemen, fustian masters, were dealing directly with weavers and selling the finished cloth in Manchester. It is a tradition in the town that a local man, Thomas Highs, was the inventor of a spinning jenny and the water frame in the 1760s, the latter invention being pirated by Richard Arkwright, who subsequently made a fortune from the patent royalties. These 18th-century improvements to the spinning process meant that handloom weavers were in great demand. but as power looms were introduced in factories in Manchester there was less work for them and there was serious unemployment in the town. In 1827 silk weaving began in Leigh, either as the result of a dispute or a labour shortage in the Middleton silk industry. William Walker was a middleman who opened the first silk mill in Leigh in 1828, and others quickly followed, including James Pownall and Henry Hilton, whose mill survived until 1926. Several cotton mills were built in Leigh after the mid-1830s, and some silk mills were converted to cotton after 1870.

The Leigth Feight took place on 14 August 1839. The chartists had called for a strike at a time when there was social unrest over the high levels of unemployment and high cost of living. A mob of at least 2,000 gathered in Leigh. About 400–500 workers from Chowbent threatened to burn down Hayes Mill. A detachment of troops from Haydock was called out, and special constables sworn in by the local magistrate. The Riot Act was read by Squire Thomas Withington of Culcheth Hall and for a while the mob dispersed but reassembled later. Many were injured in the fighting that took place and arrests were made. Those arrested were severely punished, while others ensured that radicalism continued in Leigh, leading eventually to electoral reform and universal suffrage.

The large multi-storey spinning mills came later, and five survive today. Mill complexes were built at Kirkhall Lane and Firs Lane in Westleigh, and in Pennington and Bedford. Leigh Spinners is a Grade II* listed building. Mather Lane Mill close to the Bridgewater Canal is a Grade II listed building. More than 6,000 people were employed in textiles in Leigh in 1911.

=== Coal mining ===
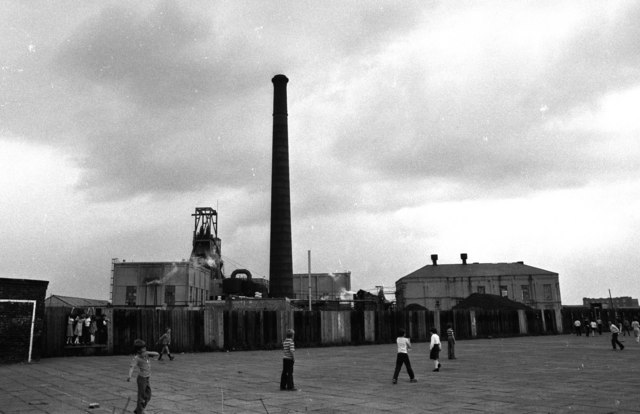
Parsonage Colliery in 1980

There had been drift mines in Westleigh since the 12th century but during the second half of the 19th century it became possible to mine the deeper seams and coal began to be an important industry and coal mining became the largest user of labour after the textile industry in Leigh. Parsonage Colliery, the last pit to be sunk in Leigh, was one of the deepest in the country, going down to over 3,000 ft (900 m). The extent of mining at Parsonage Colliery increased in the 1960s with the driving of the Horizon Tunnel, which accessed previously inaccessible seams around 6 ft (2 m) high that were easy to work. The seams were wet, and a series of pumps was used to remove the water into underground canals before it was pumped into the canal at Leigh. The winding engine at Parsonage was a steam engine, fuelled by methane extracted from the workings, while the neighbouring Bickershaw Colliery had a superior electric system. In 1974, the two pits were linked underground, and all coal was wound at Bickershaw, which had better facilities, while Parsonage was used for supplies. The entire Lancashire Coalfield is closed to deep mining, although several open-cast mines are still in operation elsewhere in the county.

Mining disasters in Leigh included the explosion of firedamp which caused the deaths of 38 miners at Bedford Colliery on 13 August 1886. There were several accidents at Bickershaw Colliery, but the most serious was in 1932, when 19 men were drowned in the sump at the bottom of the shaft after an overwind of the cage.

List of coal mines operating in Leigh
Colliery	Location	Owner	List & reference
Bankfield	Westleigh	J. Speakman	1880
Bedford Colliery	Bedford	J. Speakman & Sons	1880 1908
Bickershaw Colliery	Westleigh	Ackers Whitley & Co	1854 1918
Broadfield	Westleigh	John Speakman and Co.	1854 1869 1880
Hearts o' th' Meadow	Westleigh	Wigan Coal and Iron Co.	1880
Heyfield	Westleigh	Thomas Livesey	1854 1869 1880 1908 1918
Lower Hall	Westleigh	James Diggle	1880, 1908, 1918
Owens	Westleigh	James Diggle	1869
Parsonage Colliery	Westleigh	Wigan Coal and Iron Company	1918
Priestners	Westleigh	Wigan Coal and Iron Company	1880, 1908
Sovereign	Westleigh	Wigan Coal and Iron Company	1908, 1918
Snapes	Westleigh	James Diggle	1869, 1880, 1908
Westleigh	Westleigh	James Diggle and Co.	1854 1869, 1880, 1918
Westleigh Lane	Westleigh	Samuel Banks	1854

=== Manufacturing ===
Other notable industry included the tractor factory of David Brown Limited, which was in Leigh following the acquisition in 1955 of Harrison, McGregor and Guest's Albion range of farm machinery products. Rope-manufacture was another local industry: Mansley's Rope works on Twist Lane made rope by hand, using a rope walk. The factory burnt down in 1912. Anchor Cables had a large works close to the Bridgewater Canal. The company was bought by Callender's Cables, in 1903, later to become British Insulated Callender's Cables (BICC), part of Balfour Beatty. Another major 20th century employer was Sutcliffe Speakman, which made activated carbon and brick-making equipment.

== Governance ==
The coat of arms of the former Leigh Municipal Borough Council

Leigh is covered by four electoral wards, Leigh Central & Higher Folds, Leigh North, Leigh South and Leigh West, of the Metropolitan Borough of Wigan, although Atherton South does include some properties in Leigh. Each ward elects three councillors to the 75-member metropolitan borough council, Wigan's local authority. As of 2009, all nine ward councillors for Leigh, including leader of the council, Lord Smith of Leigh, are members of the Labour Party who control the council.

Historically, Leigh's townships were in the Hundred of West Derby, a judicial division of southwest Lancashire. Pennington, Westleigh and Bedford were three of the six townships or vills that made up the ancient parish of Leigh. The townships existed before the parish.

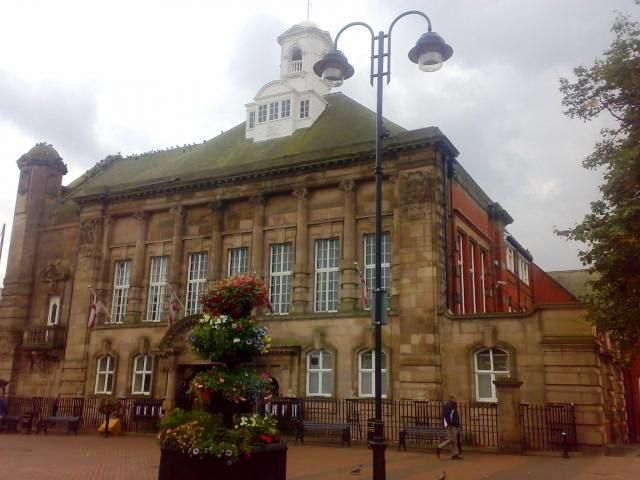
Leigh Town Hall

Under the terms of the Poor Law Amendment Act 1834 the townships formed part of Leigh Poor Law Union, established on 26 January 1837 and responsible for an area covering the whole of the ancient parish and part of Winwick. Workhouses in Pennington, Culcheth, Tyldesley and Lowton were replaced by Leigh Union workhouse at Atherleigh in the 1850s. In 1875 Leigh Local Board of Health was established, covering the areas of the former Bedford, Pennington and Westleigh Local Boards of Health. In 1894 the area of the Local Board, together with part of Atherton township, became Leigh Urban District, which was granted honorific borough status in 1899 becoming the Municipal Borough of Leigh.

In the early twentieth century Leigh saw continued activism for women's suffrage, with local activity by the Women's Social and Political Union, the National Union of Women's Suffrage Societies, the North of England Society for Women's Suffrage, the Leigh Women's Liberal Association and local branches of the Women's Labour League.

In 1969 there was an exchange of very small areas with Golborne Urban District. Following the Local Government Act 1972, the Municipal Borough of Leigh was abolished and its territory included as part of the Metropolitan Borough of Wigan, a local government district of Greater Manchester. In 1998, an area (Lately Common) was further ceded to the Borough of Warrington – one of the few parts of England to have been in three different counties since the mid-20th century: Lancashire, then Greater Manchester, then Cheshire.

Andy Burnham represented the parliamentary seat for Leigh for the Labour Party from 2001 general election. Between 10 June 2009 and the 2010 general election he was Secretary of State at the Department of Health. At the 2010 general election Burnham retained the Leigh seat with 24,295 votes and a majority of 15,011, representing 51.3% of the vote. Burnham was re-elected MP for the Leigh constituency in 2015 with 24,312 votes which was 53.9% of the total vote cast. He stepped down in 2017 to stand as a candidate for the position of Mayor of Greater Manchester. Jo Platt, representing Labour, was elected in 2017 with 26,347 votes which was 56.2% of the total votes cast. Jo Platt was defeated in the 2019 General Election, by James Grundy: the first ever Conservative representative for Leigh. However, when Grundy stood down ahead of the 2024 general election and the incorporation of the seat into the new revised constituency of Leigh and Atherton, Jo Platt subsequently returned to re-represent the town with 19,971 votes, 48.5% of the total vote cast.

== Geography ==
Leigh

Climate chart (precipitation, max. and min. temperature)
J	F	M	A	M	J	J	A	S	O	N	D
70 8 2	70 8 2	50 10 3	63 13 5	51 16 8	58 19 10	54 21 12	69 21 12	63 18 10	88 14 7	82 10 4	79 7 2
- █ Average max. and min. temperatures in °C
- █ Precipitation totals in mm
Imperial conversion
J	F	M	A	M	J	J	A	S	O	N	D
2.8 46 36	2.8 46 36	2 50 37	2.5 55 41	2 61 46	2.3 66 50	2.1 70 54	2.7 70 54	2.5 64 50	3.5 57 45	3.2 50 39	3.1 45 36
- █ Average max. and min. temperatures in °F
- █ Precipitation totals in inches

Leigh is low-lying; land to the south and east, close to Chat Moss, is 50 feet (15 m) above mean sea level. The highest land, to the north and west, rises gently to 125 feet (38 m). Astley and Bedford Mosses are fragments of the raised bog that once covered a large area north of the River Mersey and along with Holcroft and Risley Mosses are part of Manchester Mosses, a European Union designated Special Area of Conservation. The area is in the River Mersey Basin; drained into the Mersey by several streams, including the Westleigh and Pennington Brooks that join others flowing through Bedford to form the Glaze Brook. The southeast of the town has alluvial and peaty soils, but the rest is loam overlaying sandstone, or coal measures in the north. Magnesian limestone occurs in Bedford and neighbouring Astley. Mining subsidence and flooding have caused the formation of "flashes" to the south and west of the town, the largest of which is south of the Leeds and Liverpool Canal in Pennington. Pennington Flash Country Park is a 490-acre (200 ha) country park and nature reserve with a 170-acre (69 ha) flash or lake.

Leigh is crossed by the Bolton to St Helens Road high road, an old packhorse route that became a turnpike road in 1762. The A579 road bypasses the town centre using the line of the Bolton and Leigh Railway. The Bridgewater Canal and the Leigh Branch of the Leeds and Liverpool Canal cross the town west to east, the canals meeting at Leigh Bridge just south of the town centre. In the 1930s the A580 "East Lancashire Road" was built crossing to the south of the town.

== Demography ==
Leigh Compared
2001 Census	Leigh	Wigan MB	GM Urban Area	England
Total population	43,006	301,415	2,240,230	49,138,831
White	98.3%	98.7%	90.3%	90.9%
Asian	0.8%	0.4%	6.2%	4.6%
Black	0.2%	0.2%	1.3%	2.3%
Source: Office for National Statistics

At the time of the United Kingdom Census 2001, according to the Office for National Statistics, the Urban Subdivision of Leigh was part of the Greater Manchester Urban Area and had a total resident population of 43,006, of which 20,990 (48.8%) were male and 22,016 (51.2%) were female, with 18,270 households. The settlement occupied 884 hectares (3.41 sq mi), compared with 858 hectares (3.31 sq mi) in the 1991 census. Its population density was 48.65 people per hectare compared with an average of 40.20 across the Greater Manchester Urban Area. The median age of the population was 37, compared with 36 within the Greater Manchester Urban Area and 37 across England and Wales.

The majority of the population of Leigh were born in England (95.92%); 2.10% were born elsewhere within the United Kingdom, 0.95% within the rest of the European Union, and 1.47% elsewhere in the world.

Data on religious beliefs across the town in the 2001 census show that 85.5% declared themselves to be Christian, 7.6% said they held no religion, and 0.6% reported themselves as Muslim.

Most of Leigh is within the Warrington & Wigan travel to work area (TTWA), whilst part of the eastern side of the town is within the Manchester TTWA. The entire town is within the Manchester larger urban zone.

At the time of the 2001 Census, there were 19,051 people (44.3%) in employment who were resident within Leigh. Of these, 18.36% worked within the wholesale and retail trade, including repair of motor vehicles; 21.60% worked within manufacturing industry; and 11.99% worked within the health and social work sector. 45.16% of households owned a single car or van, with 30.77% owning none. The average car ownership per household was 0.98, compared with 0.93 across the Greater Manchester Urban Area.

=== Population change ===
Population growth in Leigh from 1801 to 2001
Year	1801	1811	1821	1831	1841	1851	1861	1871	1881	1891	
Population	no data	no data	18,372	20,083	28,568	5,206	10,621	no data	no data	28,708	
Year	1901	1911	1921	1931	1939	1951	1961	1971	1981	1991	2001
Population	40,001	44,103	45,532	45,317	45,458	48,728	46,174	no data	42,929	43,150	43,006
Parish 1821–1861 • Urban Sanitary District 1891 • Urban District 1901–1961 • Urban Subdivision 1981–2001

== Economy ==
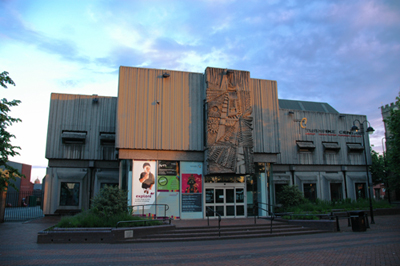
Leigh Library (opened 1971) also houses the Turnpike Gallery and Derby Room

Leigh has a traditional town centre with daily outdoor and indoor markets. Part of the town centre is pedestrianised and there are local independent and multiple retailers. The Spinning Gate Centre in the centre of town has about thirty retail units. A retail park developed on the old Parsonage Colliery site is within walking distance of the town centre.

Opened in 2008, Leigh Sports Village has an 12,000-capacity stadium (anchored by Leigh Leopards and shared with the reserves of Manchester United), an athletics arena for Leigh Harriers, facilities for Leigh East Rugby League Club, a college campus, hotel, leisure retail and business facilities for the community. In 2011, a Morrisons store opened at the sports village. Additionally, Manchester United's main women's team began to play home games at the stadium in 2018.

Another regeneration project, on the site of the former Bickershaw Colliery complex which closed in 1992, has redeveloped the site and canal side with a country park and housing. In 2011, "The Loom" a £50 million retail development opened on the north side of the Bridgewater Canal with a seven-screen cinema, Tesco Extra store, Nando's and Frankie and Benny's.

== Landmarks ==
Major landmarks in Leigh are the red sandstone parish church of St Mary the Virgin and across the civic square, Leigh Town Hall and its associated shops on Market Street. The Grade II listed obelisk that replaced the original market cross is also situated here. Many town centre buildings, including the Boar's Head public house, are in red Ruabon or Accrington bricks, often with gables and terracotta dressings. There are several large multi-storey cotton mills built along the Bridgewater Canal that are a reminder of Leigh's textile industry but most are now underused and deteriorating despite listed building status. Leigh's War Memorial by local architect J. C. Prestwich is at the junction of Church Street and Silk Street and is a Grade II listed structure. St Joseph's Church and St Thomas's Church on opposite sides of Chapel Street are both imposing churches using different materials and styles.

== Transport ==
Historically, Leigh was well connected with local transport infrastructure but, with the closure of the railway in 1969, this is no longer the case. Leigh became, and remains, one of the largest towns in Britain without direct access to the National Rail network. Public transport in the area is co-ordinated by Transport for Greater Manchester.

=== Buses ===
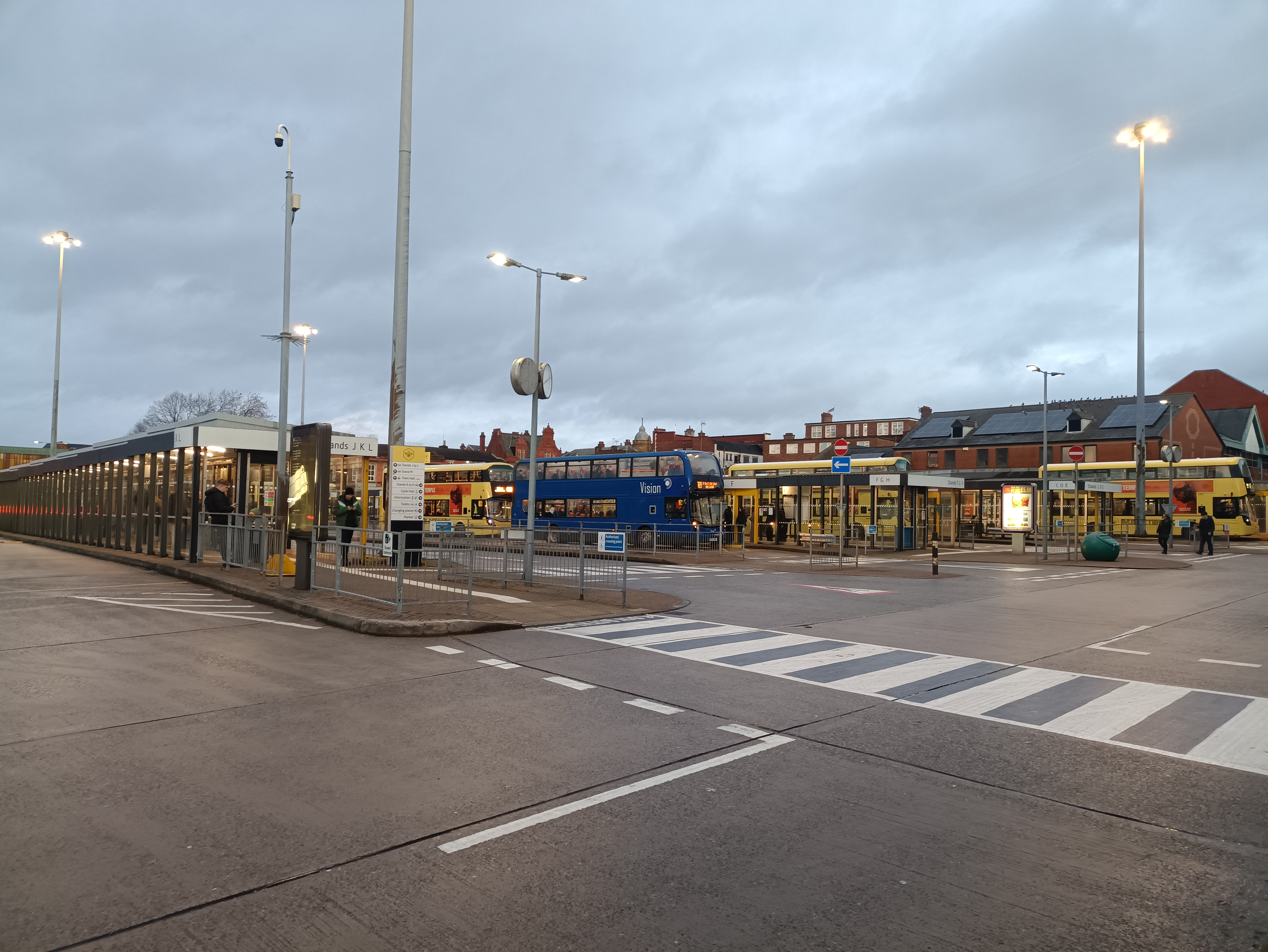
Leigh bus station

There are local bus services operated by Diamond Bus North West and Go North West which are under the Bee Network, with destinations such as the Trafford Centre, Bolton, Wigan, Piccadilly Gardens and Tyldesley. Warrington's Own Buses, Vision Bus and Arriva Merseyside connect Leigh to destinations outside of Greater Manchester, those being Warrington and St. Helens. There had been suggestions to reopen the railway via Tyldesley to Manchester, but a guided busway scheme was chosen for the route; this decision was not universally popular. Construction commenced in 2012 and the Leigh-Salford-Manchester Bus Rapid Transit opened on 3 April 2016.

=== Canals ===
The Bridgewater Canal was extended from Worsley to the middle of Leigh in 1795. In 1819 the fifth Leeds and Liverpool Canal Act was passed for the construction of the Leigh Branch and by 1820 the Leigh branch canal was cut from the Leeds and Liverpool Canal at Poolstock, Wigan to meet the Bridgewater at Leigh Bridge, giving access from Leigh to all parts of Lancashire, Yorkshire and the Midlands.

=== Railways ===
The nearest railway station to Leigh is at Atherton, 3 miles (5 km) to the north; it provides regular services between Wigan and Manchester, operated by Northern. This leaves the bus station as Leigh's only public transport link.

Leigh was the southern terminus of the 7.5-mile-long (12 km) Bolton and Leigh Railway; George Stephenson carried out the survey for the line. It opened between Bolton and William Hulton's coal mines at Chequerbent for freight on 1 August 1828 and to the terminus at the Leeds and Liverpool Canal at Leigh in March 1830. Passengers were carried from 13 June 1831. The first locomotive on the line was an 0-4-0 called the Lancashire Witch. The railway station was at Westleigh. Later the line was extended southwards to Pennington. Atherleigh opened in 1935. The line was closed to passenger traffic on 29 March 1954, and later closed completely.

In 1861, the London and North Western Railway revived powers granted to the Lancashire and Yorkshire Railway to build a railway from Manchester via Eccles and Tyldesley to Wigan with a branch to Kenyon Junction on the Liverpool to Manchester Line via Leigh and Pennington. The station, originally named Bedford Leigh served the town. The railway crossed the town on a viaduct which has since been largely demolished; it closed in May 1969. After the reopening of Mansfield and Corby railway stations, Leigh is now one of the largest towns in Great Britain without a railway station. Numerous colliery lines crossed the town but, with the closure of the collieries, these were no longer required.

=== Trams and trolley buses ===
In 1900, a Bill authorising the South Lancashire Tramways Company to construct over 62 miles (100 km) of tramway in southern Lancashire was given Royal Assent. However, by November 1900 the South Lancashire Electric Traction and Power Company had acquired the shares. The first section of tramway opened on 20 October 1902 between Lowton and Four Lanes Ends via Leigh and Atherton. The company got into financial difficulty and in turn became Lancashire United Tramways later Lancashire United Transport. On 16 December 1933, the last tram service ran from Leigh to Four Lane Ends and the next day trolley buses took over. An Act of 4 August 1920 authorised Leigh Municipal Borough to run buses. A garage built on Windermere Road was soon outgrown and replaced by one on Holden Road. The corporation had a fleet of 70 vehicles during World War II.

== Education ==
Former Leigh Grammar School for Girls

Leigh Grammar School existed in 1655 but its foundation is unclear. The building was next to the churchyard, but the school moved to Manchester Road in 1931. Leigh Girls' Grammar School was established in 1921, but both schools were abolished by the then Secretary of State for Education, Shirley Williams, in the 1976 Education Act. Leigh high schools include Bedford High School, and The Westleigh School. Pupils also attend schools in Atherton, Lowton, Golborne and Astley. Wigan and Leigh College provides post-16 education.

== Religion ==
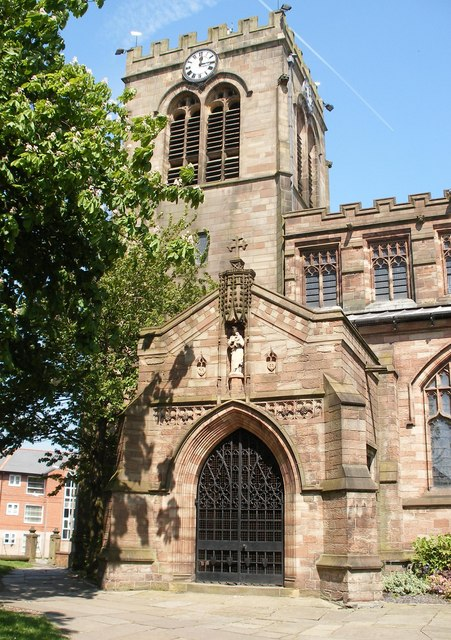
Door of Church of St Mary the Virgin

St Mary the Virgin's Church has been in existence since the 12th century and probably much earlier. It was once known as the Church of St Peter at Westleigh in Leigh, and straddles the boundary between the old townships of Westleigh and Pennington, the nave and churchyard, in Westleigh and the chancel in Pennington. Its early history is connected with the Westleigh and Urmston families. Its dedication changed to St Mary the Virgin in the 14th century. The church tower, said to have been built in 1516, is all that remains of the medieval structure, which was replaced by the present church after becoming unsafe. Paley and Austin of Lancaster designed the present church, the foundation stone was laid in 1871 and the church consecrated in 1873. The church is built in red sandstone it is a Grade II* listed building.

Parish churches have been built in each of the former townships. The first St Thomas's Church in Bedford was consecrated in 1840 and replaced by the present church in 1909. It is built of Accrington red brick with Runcorn red sandstone facings, to designs by J. S. Crowther. Christ Church, Pennington, designed by architect E. H. Shellard, was built in Yorkshire stone and was consecrated in 1854. The site to the south of the canal was a rapidly growing area at this time. It is Grade II listed. Westleigh St Paul, founded in 1847 is on Westleigh Lane. Westleigh St Peter, a Grade II* listed building by Paley and Austin, built in brick with red sandstone dressings, was founded 1881 is on Firs Lane.

The first Catholic chapel was built in Bedford on the corner of Mather Lane and Chapel Street in 1778 and this lasted until it was replaced in 1855 by St Joseph's Church by architect Joseph Hansom. A growing Catholic population in the area led to the building of Our Lady of the Rosary in Plank Lane in 1879, Twelve Apostles in 1879 and Sacred Heart in 1929. Other denominations catered for include Wesleyan, Independent, Primitive, Welsh and United Methodists. There are also Unitarian, Baptist and Jehovah's Witness places of worship in the town.

== Sport ==
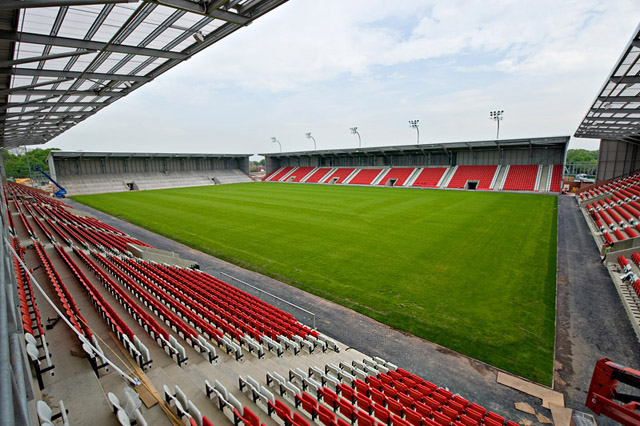
Leigh Sports Village stadium under construction in 2008

Leigh has a professional rugby league team – Leigh Leopards – whose main claim to fame is beating Hull KR 17-16 in the 2023 Challenge Cup final at Wembley Stadium for the third time. The club play in the Super League. Leigh has several amateur clubs, including Leigh East and Leigh Miners Rangers.

The town had a semi-professional football team, Leigh Genesis (formerly Leigh RMI), which ceased operations at a senior level in June 2011. The most successful amateur club is Leigh Athletic, which currently plays in the Manchester Football League.

Leigh also has an athletics club, Leigh Harriers AC, founded in 1909, and a Rugby Union club, Leigh RUFC, based at Round Ash Park, which gained promotion in 2007, to RFU league North 2 (West), and is current holder of the Lancashire Trophy which it won in May 2008 for the third consecutive year. Attached to the club is a crown green bowling section which runs several teams in local bowling leagues. Leigh has two cricket clubs: Leigh Cricket Club play in the ECB Premier League Liverpool Competition, and Westleigh Cricket Club, have two senior and 4 junior teams playing in the Greater Manchester Cricket League.

== Media ==
Local news and television programmes are provided by BBC North West and ITV Granada. Television signals are received from the Winter Hill TV transmitter.

The town is served by both BBC Radio Lancashire and BBC Radio Manchester. Radio M29, a community based station, also serves the area.

Local newspaper is the Leigh Journal which publishes on Thursdays. It is also covered by the regional newspaper the Manchester Evening News.

== Culture ==
Many of Leigh's old halls have been demolished but the sites of Lilford Park, once the grounds of Atherton Hall, a gift to Leigh from Lord Lilford in 1914 and Pennington Park, the grounds of Pennington Hall which was demolished in 1963 after being used as a museum, are open to the public.

Leigh's wealth as an industrial town resulted in many outlets for the entertainment of its population, including theatres, cinemas and public houses. In 1908 the Hippodrome Theatre on Leigh Road was built on the site of Walker's silk mill of 1827, this subsequently became a cinema, first the Odeon, later the Classic. Another theatre, the Theatre Royal, was built on Lord Street which later became the Leigh Casino Club. The Palace Cinema was built in 1913 on Railway Road and the assembly rooms above the Conservative Club, were converted to a cinema known as the Sems in 1908. Brewery Lane is a reminder that there was once a brewery in Bedford belonging to George Shaw & Co. The old Leigh College and Library on Railway Road was built between 1894 and 1896 by the Leigh Literary Society to designs by J. C. Prestwich and J. H. Stephen. The present library was built in 1971 between the parish church and town hall.

Leigh Hackspace was founded as a UK Community interest company in 2015

== Notable people ==
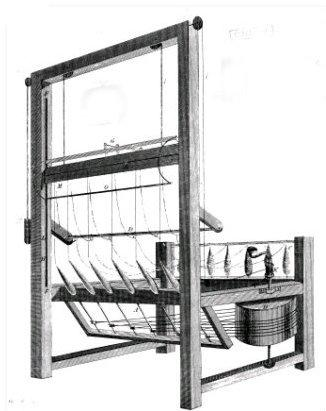
Thomas Highs spinning jenny

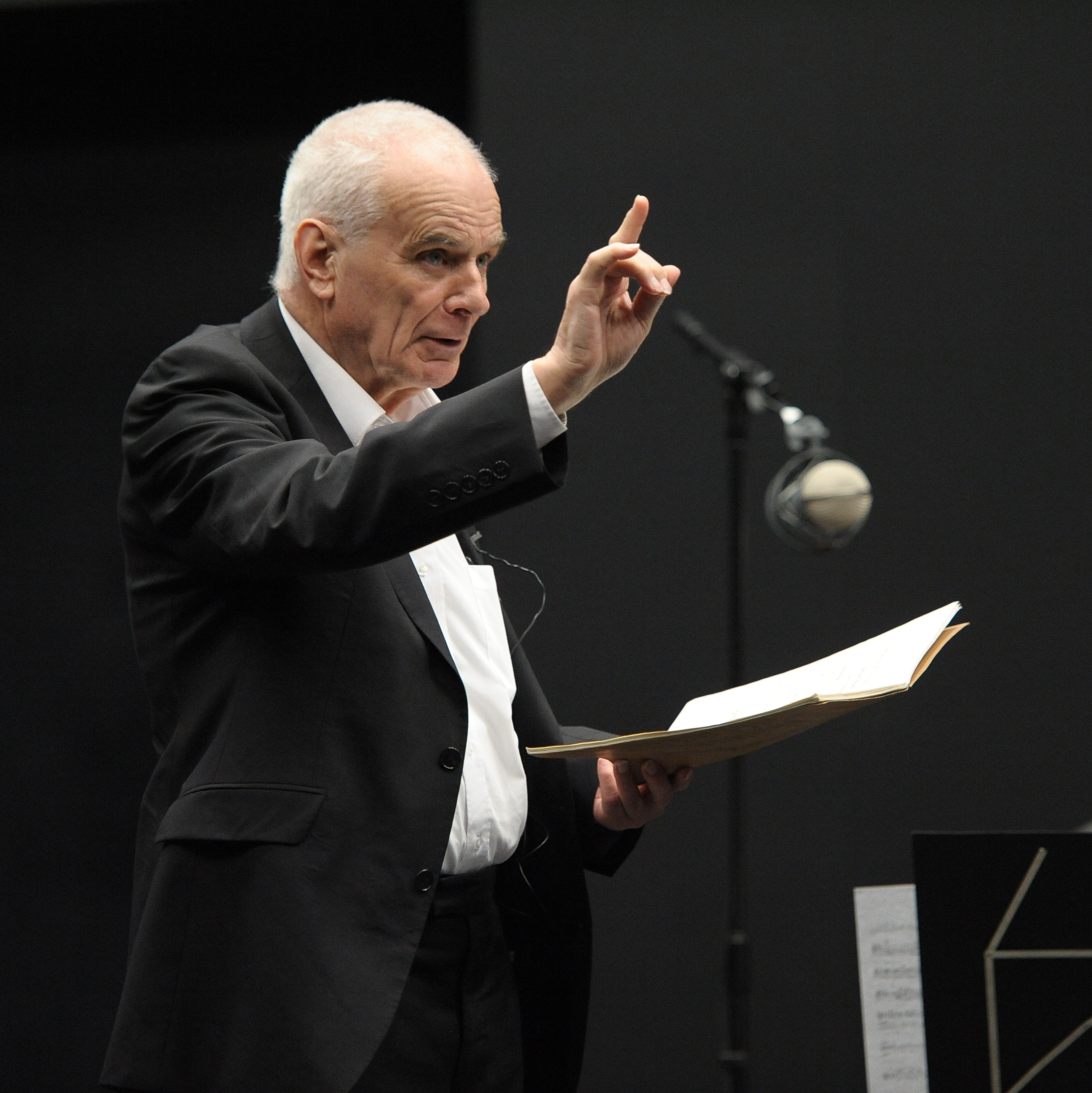
Peter Maxwell Davies

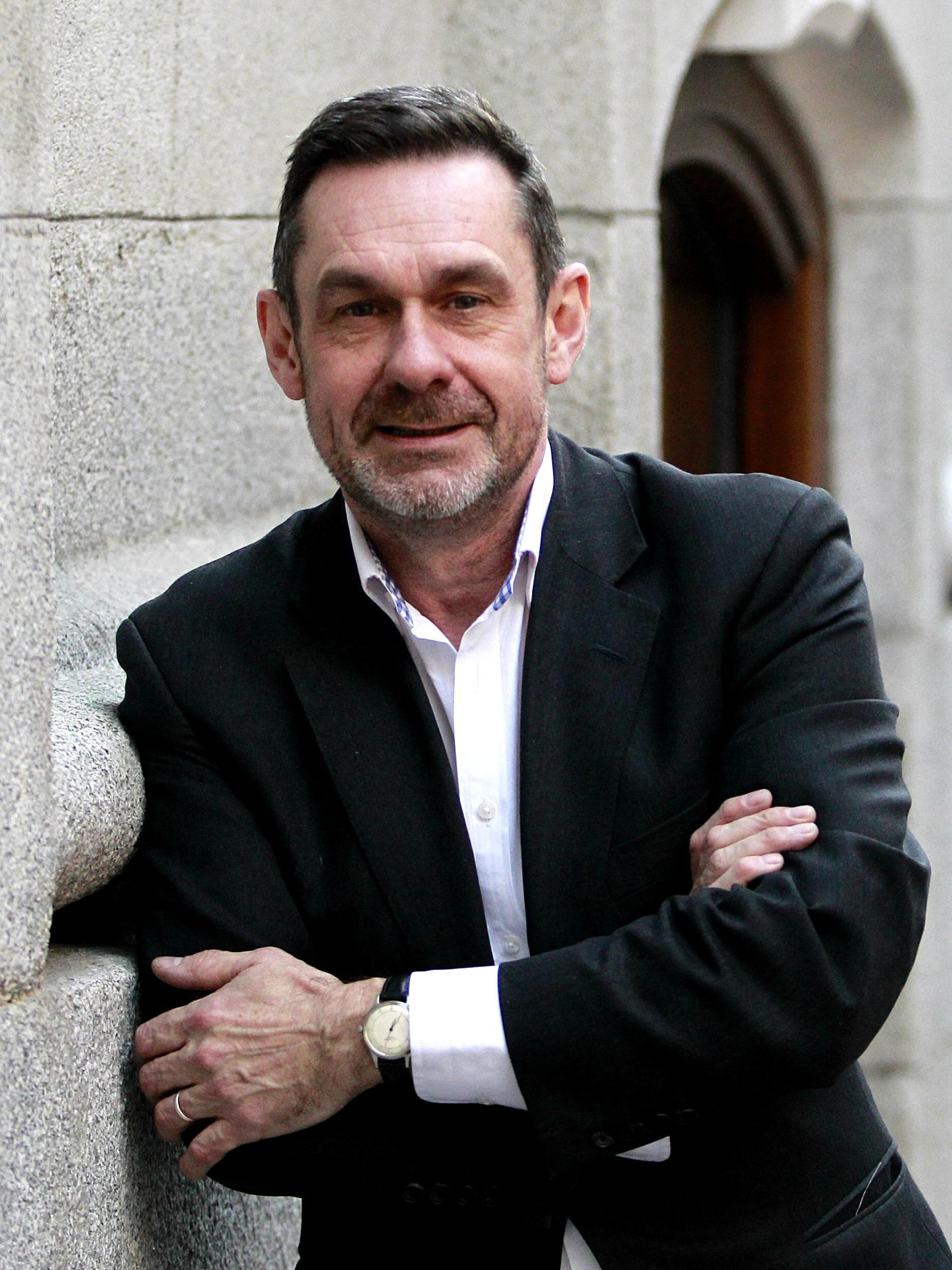
Paul Mason

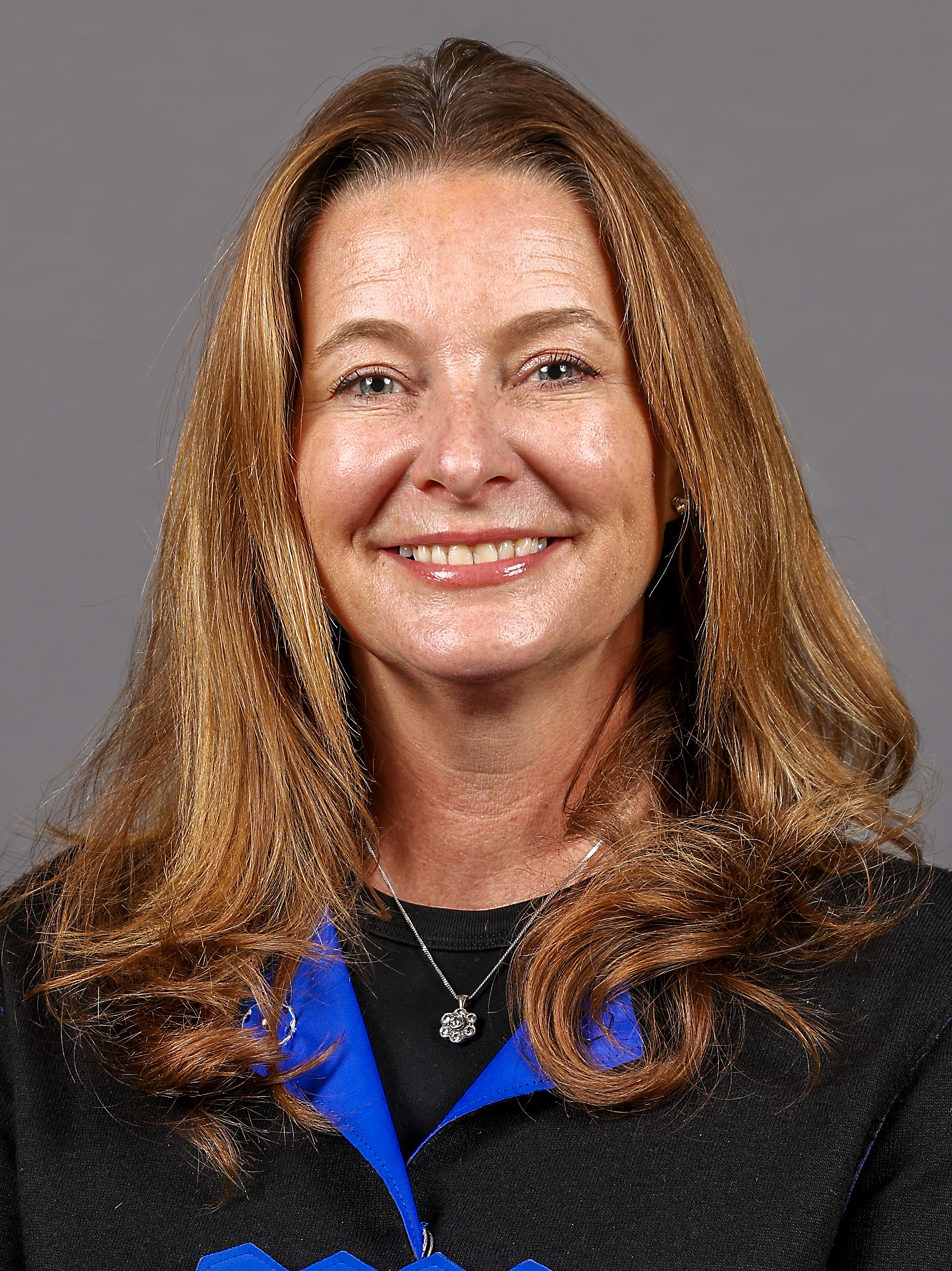
Gillian Keegan

- Thomas Highs (1718–1803), a reed-maker and manufacturer of cotton carding and spinning engines
- Joseph Farington (1747–1821), an English landscape painter and diarist.
- George Farington (1752–1788), an English artist of historical subjects.
- Ann Fletcher Jackson (1833–1903), a New Zealand Quaker evangelist, born in Leigh.
- Charles Albert Berry (1852–1899), English nonconformist divine.
- Mary Pownall (1862-1937), sculptor, daughter of James Pownall the silk maker, born and raised locally.
- Tom Brown (1886–1970), coal miner, politician and MP for Ince, 1942-1964
- Thomas Burke (1890–1969), operatic tenor, born in Leigh and attended St Joseph's School.
- Sir John Lennard-Jones (1894–1954), mathematician and professor of theoretical physics at the University of Bristol, and then of theoretical science at the University of Cambridge.
- Alfred Robert Wilkinson (1896–1940), Victoria Cross recipient; private in the 1/5th Battalion, The Manchester Regiment, during the Battle of the Selle in WWI.
- James Hilton (1900–1954), author of Goodbye, Mr Chips, born in Leigh.
- Kathleen Drew-Baker (1901–1957), phycologist, researched the edible seaweed Porphyra laciniata (nori), which led to a breakthrough for commercial cultivation in Japan.
- George Henry Bolsover (1910–1990), historian, diplomat, and director of the School of Slavonic and East European Studies at the University of London, 1947–1976, was a pupil at Leigh Grammar School.
- Sir Alan R. Battersby (1925–2018), organic chemist, born in Leigh, pupil at Leigh Grammar School.
- Sir Maurice Flanagan (1928–2015), businessman, the founding CEO of Emirates and executive vice-chairman of The Emirates Group.
- Sir Peter Maxwell Davies (1934–2016) was a British composer and conductor
- Lynda Lee-Potter (née Higginson) (1935–2004), journalist was best known as a columnist for the Daily Mail
- Georgie Fame (born 1943), rhythm and blues singer and musician, born Clive Powell in Leigh.
- Phil Gartside (1952–2016), businessman and Chairman of Bolton Wanderers F.C. (1999–2015).
- Pete Shelley (1955–2018), singer, songwriter and guitarist with the Buzzcocks educated locally.
- Paul Mason (born 1960), journalist was born and educated in Leigh.
- Trevor Mann (born 1961), engineer and Chief Operating Officer of Mitsubishi Motors until 2019.
- Tracie Bennett (born 1961), singer and TV actress, she played Sharon Gaskell in Coronation Street
- David Morris (born 1966), politician, MP for Morecambe and Lunesdale 2010-2024, was born in Leigh.
- Lemn Sissay (born 1967), author, broadcaster and poet; Chancellor of the University of Manchester, lived in local children's homes and was schooled locally.
- Gillian Keegan (born 1968), politician, MP for Chichester 2017 to 2024 and Secretary of State for Education from 2022 to 2024
- Lisa Hession (born 1970) unsolved murder victim
- Shaun Keaveny (born 1972), DJ and broadcaster, grew up in Leigh.
- James Grundy (born 1978), politician and MP for Leigh from 2019 to 2024.
- Sarah Jayne Dunn (born 1981), actress, played Mandy Richardson on the Channel 4 soap opera Hollyoaks
- Jessica Hall (born 1981) actress, portrayed Sheila Buxton in the Channel 4 soap opera Hollyoaks.
- Jonathan Jackson (born 2006), Musician, Raised locally, Plays in Heavy Metal band Unharvested (band)

=== Sport ===
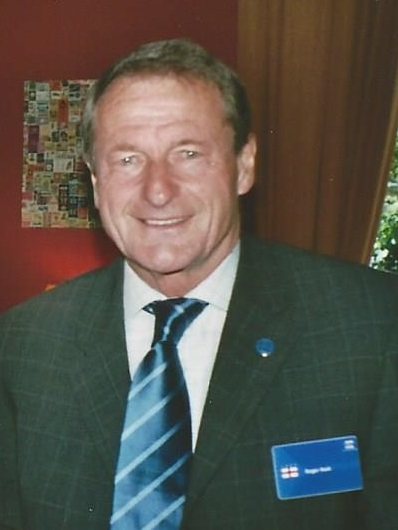
Roger Hunt

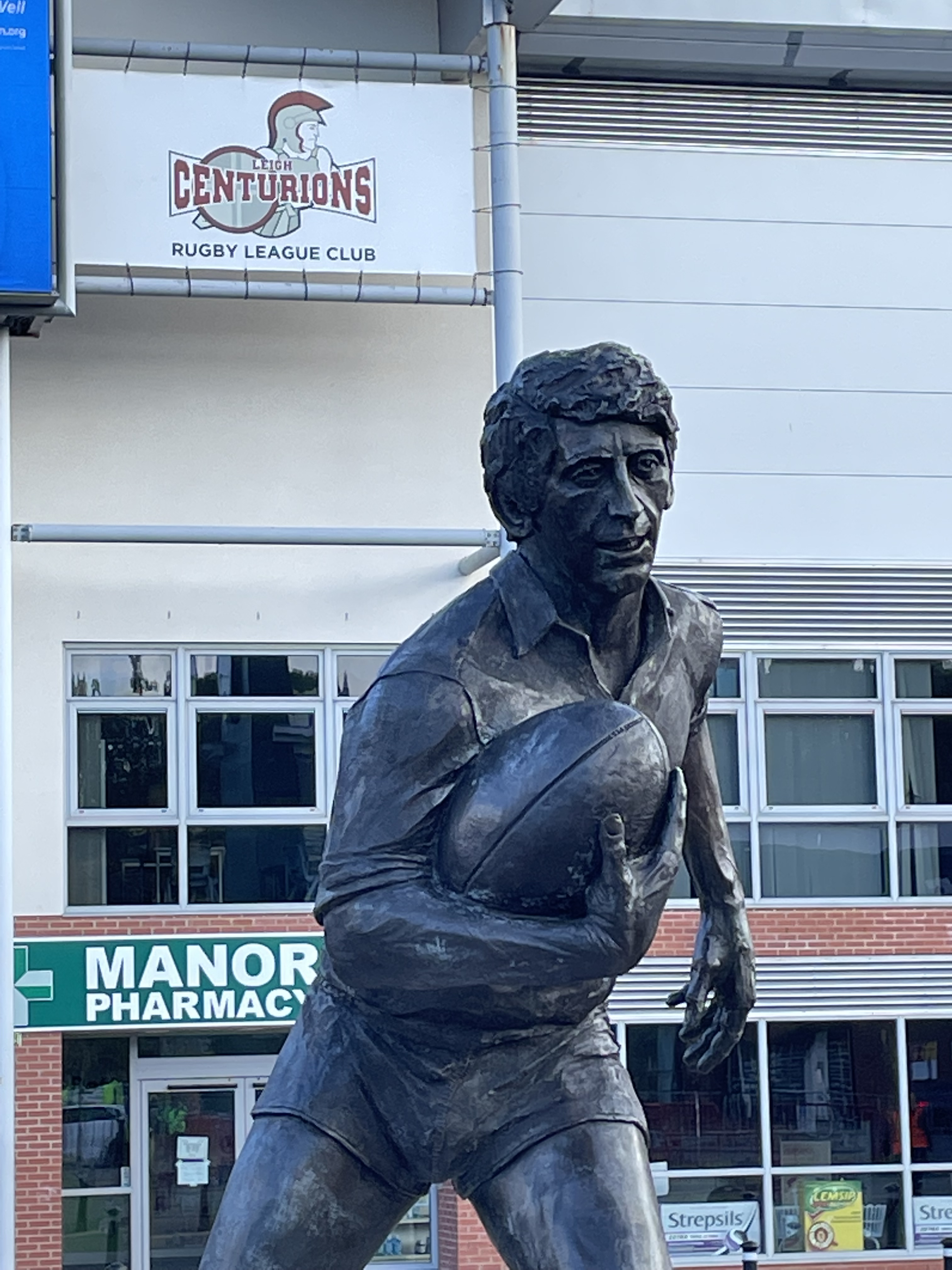
John Woods statue outside the LSV stadium

- Ellis Clarkson (1887–1947), rugby league footballer who played 305 games including 214 for Leigh Leopards
- Joe Cartwright (1890–1949), rugby league footballer who played 348 games for Leigh Leopards
- Joe Darwell (1891–1953), rugby league footballer who played 297 games for Leigh Leopards
- Alick Robinson (1906–1977), footballer who played 373 games including 204 for Burnley & 169 for Bury
- Gerry Helme (1923–1981), rugby league footballer who played 442 games for Warrington Wolves
- Bernard Ganley (1927–2009), rugby league footballer who played 341 games for Oldham R.L.F.C.
- Alan Davies (1933–2009), rugby league footballer who played 536 games including 391 for Oldham R.L.F.C.
- Frank Pitchford (1934–1990), rugby league footballer who played 305 games for Oldham R.L.F.C.
- Mick Martyn (1936–2017), rugby league footballer who played 329 games for Leigh Leopards
- Roger Hunt (1938–2021), footballer, played 530 games including 404 for Liverpool, born and schooled locally.
- Colin Tyrer (born 1943), rugby league footballer, played 437 games including 248 for Wigan Warriors
- Brian Ashton (born 1946), rugby union coach and ex-player; head coach for England and Ireland national teams.
- Thomas Martyn (1946–2016), rugby league footballer, played 445 games including 220 for Warrington Wolves
- David Eckersley (born 1948), rugby league footballer, played 553 games including over 160 for both Leigh Leopards & Widnes Vikings
- Steve Donlan (born 1954), rugby league footballer, played 336 games including 240 for Leigh Leopards
- John Woods (born 1956), rugby league player, played 511 games including 302 for Leigh Leopards and 18 for Great Britain and England. There is a statue of him outside Leigh Sports Village.
- John Pendlebury (born 1961), rugby league footballer, played 385 games including 122 for Wigan Warriors
- Darren Wright (born 1968), rugby league and rugby union footballer who played 345 games for Widnes Vikings
- Tommy Martyn (born 1971), rugby league footballer, played 325 games including 211 for St Helens R.F.C.
- Chris Priest (born 1973), footballer, played 343 games including 155 for Chester City
- Paul Rowley (born 1975), rugby league coach and footballer, played 395 games including for Halifax Panthers & Leigh Leopards
- Stuart Donlan (born 1978), rugby league coach and player, played 387 games including 194 for Leigh Leopards in two contracts
- Sean Penkywicz (born 1982), rugby league footballer, played 420 games including 163 for Halifax Panthers
- Jason Lowe (born 1991), footballer, raised locally, played over 390 games, including 173 for Blackburn Rovers

== See also ==
- Listed buildings in Leigh, Greater Manchester
- List of people from Wigan
- List of mills in Wigan
- List of mining disasters in Lancashire
