= Wigan Coal and Iron Company =

British Mining Company

The Wigan Coal and Iron Company was formed when collieries on the Lancashire Coalfield owned by John Lancaster were acquired by Lord Lindsay, the Earl of Crawford and Balcarres, owner of the Haigh Colliery in 1865. The company owned collieries in Haigh, Aspull, Standish, Westhoughton, Blackrod, Westleigh and St Helens and large furnaces and iron-works in Aspull near Wigan and the Manton Colliery in Nottinghamshire.

== History ==
Collieries belonging to the Wigan Coal and Iron Company in 1896 were the Alexandra, Bawkhouse, Bridge and Meadow Pits in Haigh and Lyndsay in Wigan. The largest, the Alexandra Pit employed more than 650 workers and the Lindsay Pits more than 350. The Crawford, Kirkless, Moor and Woodshaw Pits in Aspull employed over 1,000 workers. Eatock Pits in Westhoughton employed 484 underground and 89 surface workers whilst the Hewlett Pits in Hart Common employed 981 underground and 182 on the surface. Ladies Lane Colliery in Hindley employed 282 underground and 40 surface workers. The Westleigh Pits were Priestners which employed 387 underground and 70 on the surface, Snapes, and Sovereign which had 180 underground workers and 68 on the surface. The King Coal Pit at Blackrod was a pumping pit, retained to drain the colliery workings. In Standish the company owned the Broomfield, Giants Hall, Gidlow, John, Langtree, Robin Hill, Swire and Taylor Pits. The largest of these was the Langtree Pit with more than 540 employees.

Wigan Coal and Iron Company was the biggest colliery owner on the Lancashire Coalfield and in the 1920s employed 9,000 workers. The shafts of Parsonage Colliery in Leigh, sunk by the company between 1913 and 1920, were at the time the deepest in Britain.

The Wigan Coal & Iron Company had an operation on South Quay, Douglas, Isle of Man in the early 20th century, presumably importing coal from Lancashire

The company operated Berkune pit, an iron ore mine near Dalton in Furness, until 1898.

In 1930, the Wigan Coal & Iron Co. Ltd and the Pearson & Knowles Coal & Iron Co. Ltd combined their coal mining operations to establish the Wigan Coal Corporation.

In the same year, the iron and steel activities of Wigan Coal & Iron were conglomerated with Pearson & Knowles, Ryland Bros, and the Partington Steel & Iron Works Ltd, to create the Lancashire Steel Corporation. The corporation was headed by the Earl of Crawford & Balcarres. The separate coal and steel corporations continued until nationalization in the 1940s.

Notes

Bibliography

- Challinor, Raymond (1972), The Lancashire and Cheshire Miners, Frank Graham, ISBN 0-902833-54-5
