= St Joseph's Roman Catholic Church, Leigh =

Church in Leigh, Greater Manchester, England

Coordinates: 53.494°N 2.508°W

St Joseph's Church
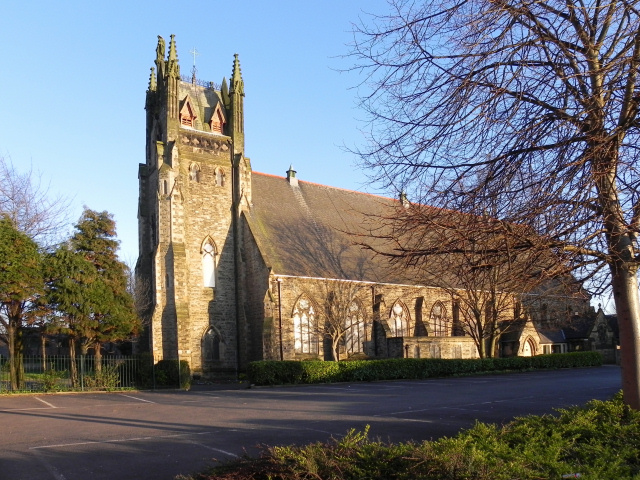
- St Joseph's Church

Religion
- Affiliation: Roman Catholic
- Ecclesiastical or organizational status: Active
- Year consecrated: 1855

Location
- Location: Leigh, Greater Manchester, England
- Interactive map of St Joseph's Church

Architecture
- Architect: Joseph Hansom
- Type: Church
- Style: Gothic Revival
- Completed: 1855, tower 1878
- Materials: Sandstone

St Joseph's Church is an active Roman Catholic church in, Leigh in Greater Manchester, England. It is in the parish of St Edmund Arrowsmith. It has been designated by English Heritage as a Grade II listed building.

== History ==
After the Reformation when the Church of England left the Catholic Church several recussant families in Leigh kept the 'Old Faith'. Mass was heard in secret at Bedford Hall, Hopecarr and Hall House. Ambrose Barlow carried out priestly duties in the parish while living at Morleys Hall in Astley.

Father John Penketh, the first Jesuit priest in Bedford in 1678 was imprisoned in Lancaster. John Shaw built the old chapel from which Chapel Street is named in 1778. One of his successors, Father John Reeve who served from 1828 until 1840, built the school. The brick-built chapel was replaced by St Joseph's Church which opened on 3 May 1855. Father John Middlehurst raised funds for construction of the nave, chancel and tower base and his successor, Father James Fanning completed the tower in 1878. Among the priests to serve the parish was the poet Gerard Manley Hopkins who arrived in 1879.

== Architecture ==
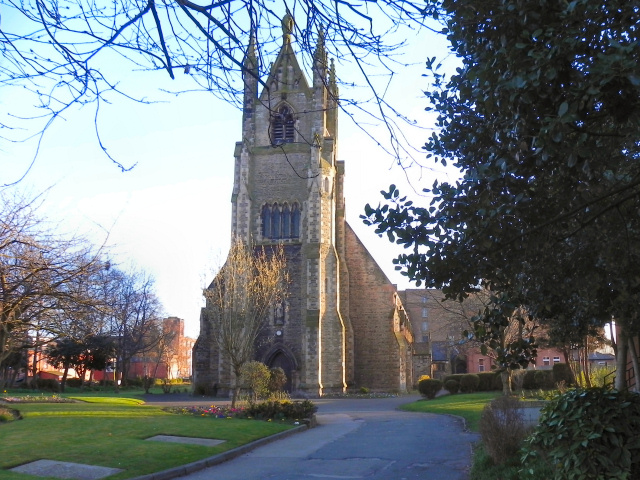
Front of the church

The church was designed in the Gothic Revival style by Joseph Hansom and built in 1855 in hammer-dressed stone with a slate roof with fishscale bands. In plan it has a wide nave, polygonal chancel, chapels on the north and south sides, a sacristy, south porch and west tower.

=== Exterior ===
The north and south elevations have nine bays on a projecting plinth separated by buttresses and three-light windows with Geometrical tracery. The chancel has two and three-light windows. The three-stage tower has angled buttresses with an octagonal stair turret in one corner. Above the arched west door at the second stage is a statue and niche. The third stage has four lancet windows and above them two-light belfry openings below the gables. The gable roof has a statue finial flanked by pinnacles.

=== Interior ===
Nikolaus Pevsner describes the interior as "startling". It is a very wide "preaching box" with an apsidal chancel. Its hammerbeam roof failed and slender cast iron columns with palm capitals were installed with iron arches and braces above them creating an arcade.

== See also ==
- List of churches in Greater Manchester
- Listed buildings in Leigh, Greater Manchester
