= Ann Fletcher Jackson =

New Zealand Quaker evangelist

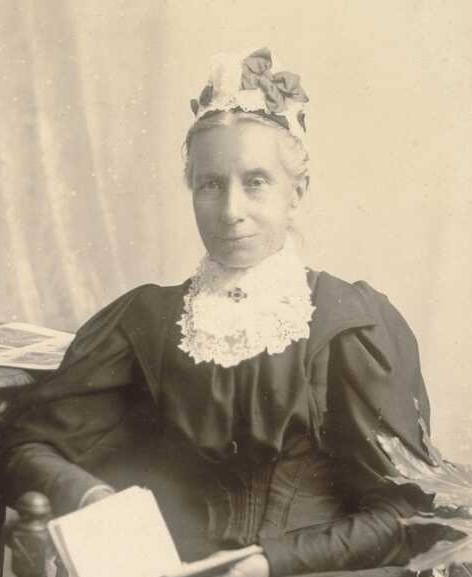
Photograph of Ann Fletcher Jackson in about 1890

Ann Fletcher Jackson (27 February 1833 – 15 October 1903) was a New Zealand Quaker evangelist.

== Biography ==
She was born in Leigh, Lancashire, England, on 27 February 1833.
