= Pennington, Greater Manchester =

Coordinates: 53.4940°N 2.4998°W

Pennington
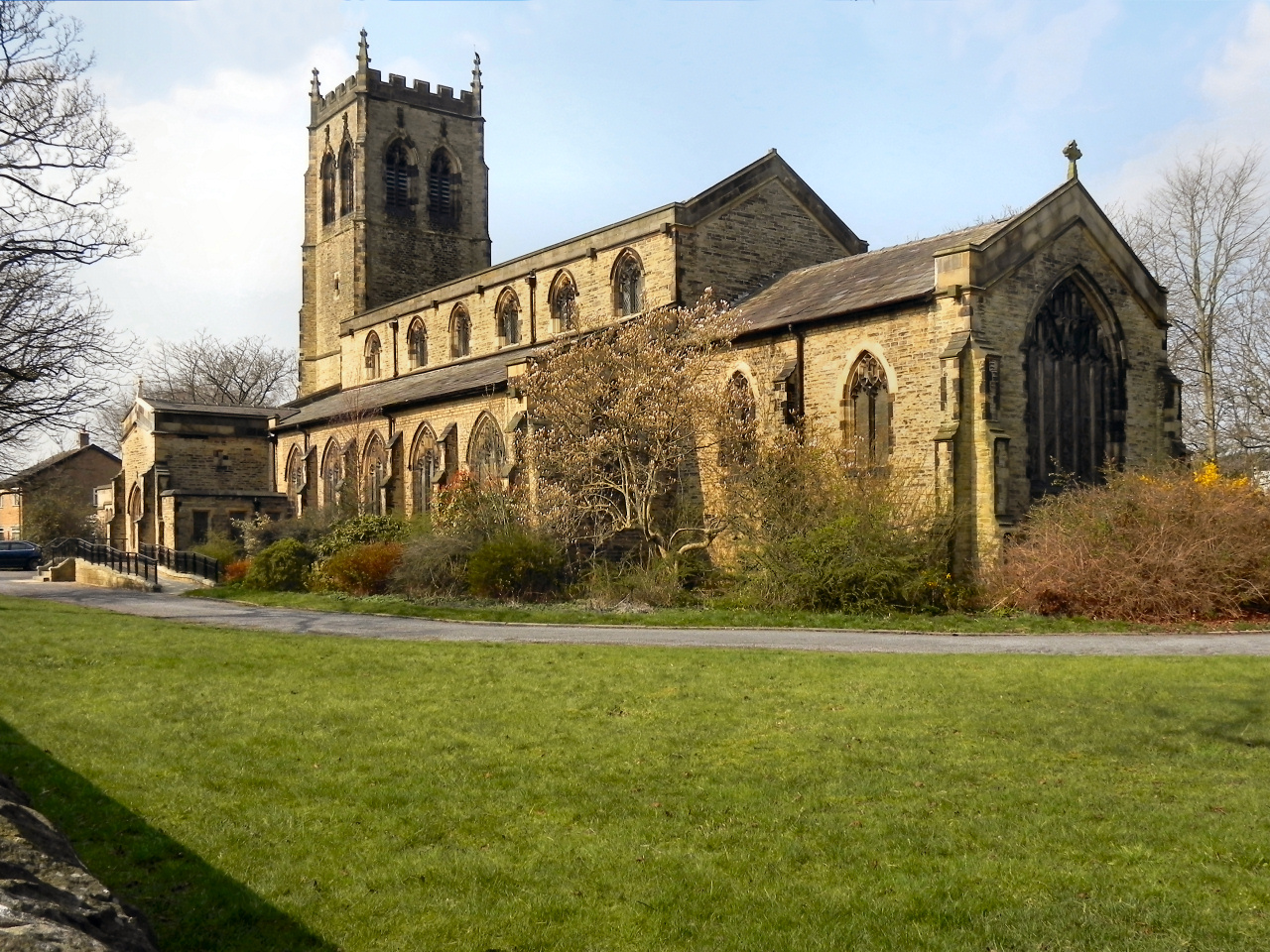
- Christ Church

- Location within Greater Manchester
- Metropolitan borough: Wigan
- Metropolitan county: Greater Manchester
- Region: North West
- Country: England
- Sovereign state: United Kingdom
- Post town: LEIGH
- Postcode district: WN7
- Dialling code: 01942
- Police: Greater Manchester
- Fire: Greater Manchester
- Ambulance: North West

Pennington is a suburb of Leigh, in the Wigan district, in the county of Greater Manchester, England. It was one of six townships in the ancient ecclesiastical parish of Leigh, that with Westleigh and Bedford merged to form the town of Leigh in 1875. The township of Pennington covered most of Leigh's town centre.

== History ==
=== Toponymy ===
Pennington derives either from the Old English meaning "a farmstead or small holding paying a penny rent" or a "settlement associated with a man named Pinna". Pennington has been variously recorded as Pininton in 1246, Pynynton in 1360, Penynton in 1305, Pynyngton in 1351 and 1442, and Penyngton in 1443. In 1663 it was also recorded as Pinington.

=== Manor ===
Historically Pennington comprised one manor surrounded by a small settlement. Land in Pennington was gifted to Cockersand Abbey by Margery de Pennington in the early 13th century. Adam Pennington who took his name from the township was Lord of the manor at the end of the 13th century. In 1312 the Bradshaws became the chief landowners and held the manor until 1703 residing at Pennington Hall. In 1579 there is a record of a water corn mill attached to the manor house, it was destroyed in a fire in 1829. Pennington Hall was rebuilt in 1748 by Samuel Hilton and sold to the Gaskells of Thornes, Wakefield in 1807.

=== Industrial revolution ===
After 1800 the township of Pennington was dominated by the textile industry which developed from handloom weaving which had developed as a cottage industry.

== Governance ==
Pennington
- History
  - Created: Middle Ages
  - Abolished: 1894
  - Succeeded by: Leigh Urban District
- Status: Township

Historically, Pennington formed part of the Hundred of West Derby, a judicial division of southwest Lancashire. It was one of six townships or vills that made up the ancient ecclesiastical parish of Leigh. Pennington was also a chapelry. The townships existed before the parish. Under the terms of the Poor Law Amendment Act 1834 the townships formed part of the Leigh Poor Law Union which was established on 26 January 1837 comprising an area covering the whole of the parish of Leigh and part of Winwick. The workhouses in Pennington, Culcheth, Tyldesley, and Lowton, but they were replaced by Leigh Union workhouse at Atherleigh in the 1850s. The Local Government Act, 1858, was adopted by the township in 1863 and Pennington Local Board of Health was established. In 1866, the legal definition of 'parish' was changed to be the areas used for administering the poor laws, and so Pennington became a civil parish. In 1875 it became part of that of Leigh Local Board of Health. By a Local Government Order in 1894 the civil parish of Pennington merged with Westleigh, Bedford and part of Atherton on 29 September to form Leigh and became part of Leigh Urban District In 1891 the parish had a population of 8325.

== Geography ==
The township of Pennington covered an area of 1,482 acres, much of it below 75 feet above mean sea level, but slightly higher to the north of Pennington Brook, which crosses the township from west to east, The highest point is a little over 100 feet in the south-west near Aspull Common. The township extended into what is now Leigh town centre where the parish church was on the boundary with Westleigh. The geology consists of the pebble beds of the bunter series of the new red sandstone, with an area of alluvium in the low ground by the Pennington Brook.

== Transport ==
The turnpike road from Bolton to St Helens passed through Pennington. The A580 "East Lancashire" Road passes through the south of Pennington and opened in 1934.

The Bridgewater Canal crosses the township for a short distance on the south side of Leigh town centre.

A station, formerly called Bradshaw Leach Station and later renamed Pennington Station, was built on the Bolton, Leigh and Kenyon branch of the London and North Western Railway at the junction with the Tyldesley Loopline of the same railway.

== Education ==
A grammar school was established in Pennington, near the church.
