= St Mary the Virgin's Church, Leigh =

Parish Church of St Mary the Virgin, Leigh
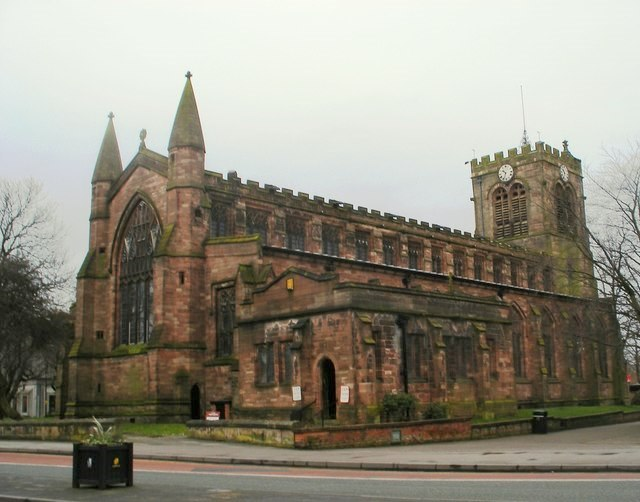
- Parish Church of St Mary the Virgin
- Parish Church of St Mary the Virgin, Leigh
- 53.49830°N 2.51966°W
- OS grid reference: SD 656 003
- Location: St Mary's Way, Leigh, Greater Manchester
- Country: England
- Denomination: Church of England
- Website: Leigh Parish Church Website

History
- Former name: St Peter
- Status: Parish church
- Dedication: Saint Mary the Virgin
- Consecrated: Present building 12 February 1873

Architecture
- Functional status: Active
- Heritage designation: Grade II*
- Designated: 7 November 1966
- Architect(s): Paley and Austin, Paley, Austin and Paley, Austin and Paley
- Architectural type: Church
- Style: Gothic Revival
- Completed: 1873
- Construction cost: £8,738

Specifications
- Capacity: 710
- Materials: red sandstone

Administration
- Province: York
- Diocese: Manchester
- Archdeaconry: Salford
- Deanery: Salford & Leigh
- Parish: Leigh

Clergy
- Vicar: vacant from 27 August 2023

The Parish Church of St Mary the Virgin (grid reference SD656003) is a Church of England parish church in Leigh, Greater Manchester, England. It is a member of the Salford & Leigh deanery in the archdeaconry of Salford, diocese of Manchester. It is recorded in the National Heritage List for England as a designated Grade II* listed building.

Leigh was in the Diocese of Lichfield and Coventry until 1541 when it was transferred to the Diocese of Chester. In 1847 Leigh became the only parish in the Hundred of West Derby to be part of the new Diocese of Manchester. Leigh has had its own deanery since 1933. Before that it was part of the deanery of Eccles and prior to that Warrington.

== History ==
St. Mary's is in the centre of Leigh by the Civic Square, which was originally the market place, next to the library and opposite the town hall. The church was mentioned in documents in the 13th century but the date of its foundation is uncertain. The first church on the site, dedicated to St Peter, was described as the Church of Westleigh in Leigh. Its dedication was changed to St Mary the Virgin at the end of the 14th century. The church straddled the ancient boundary between the townships of Westleigh and Pennington, the nave and churchyard in Westleigh and the chancel in Pennington.

For several hundred years it was the mother church for the six townships, Westleigh, Pennington, Bedford, Astley, Atherton and Tyldesley, that made up the ancient ecclesiastical parish. For baptisms, marriages and funerals the population of the townships had to travel to St Mary's or else churches that lay outside the parish boundaries, such as St Mary's Deane, All Saints' Church in Wigan or St Mary the Virgin Eccles. The first Astley Chapel was built as a chapel of ease and consecrated in 1631. A second chapel of ease dedicated to St John the Baptist at Chowbent was built in 1645 by John Atherton but not consecrated until 1723. A third daughter church, St George's Church, Tyldesley, was consecrated in 1825, St Thomas in Bedford was built in 1840 and Christ Church, Pennington in 1854.

The early history of the church was linked with the Westleigh family who were Lords of the Manor of Westleigh. John de Westleigh was parish priest in the reign of King John (1199–1216). The church was probably rebuilt during the 15th century. The tower dates from about 1500. A chantry chapel dedicated to St Nicholas, known as the Tyldesley Chapel occupied the east end of the north aisle and the Atherton Chapel, dedicated to St Mary the eastern end of the south aisle. The tower was restored twice, once in 1721 and again in 1849. By the late-1860s the church had become unsafe.

In 1871–73 the church, apart from the tower, was rebuilt by the Lancaster architects Paley and Austin at a cost of £8,738 (equivalent to £820,000 in 2025), providing seating for 710 people. James Fraser, Bishop of Manchester reconsecrated the building in February 1873. In 1890, the successors on the Lancaster practice, Paley, Austin and Paley, refitted the chancel, including the provision of an altar and reredos. In 1909–10 the same practice, then known as Austin and Paley, added a choir vestry to the north of the church, and recased the tower.

During the 1871–73 reconstruction the date 1616 was found on a roof beam but it is thought the roof of the St Nicholas or Tyldesley Chapel which was restored and reused dates from about 1500. Sir Thomas Tyldesley was buried here after his death in the Battle of Wigan Lane.

James Irvine, vicar, was so anti "non-conformist" that he refused burial or blessing of those, including children, that had died and required a final resting place.

== Structure ==
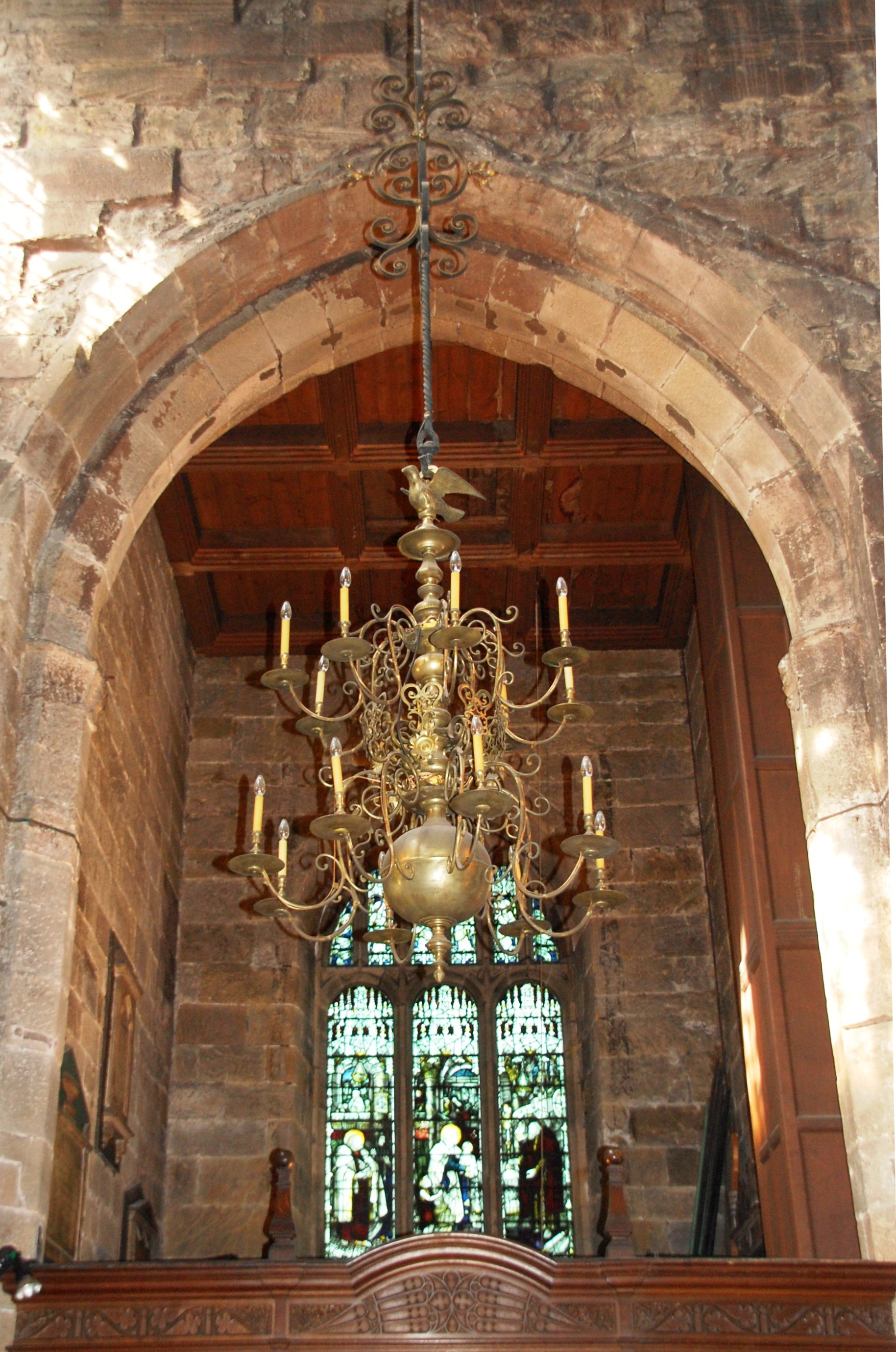
18th century brass candelabra

The church was rebuilt on the foundations of the original church in hammer-dressed sandstone in the Gothic Revival Perpendicular style. (Note: Brandwood et al. comment that this is an early use of the Perpendicular style in the Gothic Revival in such "a very conscious and very demonstrative use of the style", and state that there is "no comparable example in England from about this time".) The church has a six-bay nave and two-bay chancel under a continuous roof with a clerestory and crenellated parapet. The bays have three-light aisle windows with rectilinear tracery and hoodmoulds, the clerestory windows have two-light flat-headed arches. There are octagonal pinnacled piers at the east corners of the chancel, either side of the five-light east window.

The tower, is also castellated retaining the 16th century studded oak west doors beneath an elliptical arch. The tower has weathered diagonal buttresses and a three-light west window. There are two-light belfry openings on all sides below the clock faces. The north vestry dates from 1910 by the same architects. Nikolaus Pevsner describes the six bay interior with octagonal piers as being "impressive in scale". The roofline of the previous church is visible on the wall of the tower inside the church.

== Fittings and furniture ==
The Speakman Window

The tower has a ring of eight bells. Six were cast in 1740 by Abel Rudhall of Gloucester and the treble and second were cast in 1761, also by Rudhall's. These bells replace four bells reputed to have been given by Queen Elizabeth I. Two of the earlier bells were cast in Leigh in 1692 and 1705. In March 2010 the bells were taken down for transportation to Dorset where they were restored at a cost of £30,000.

The north aisle roof is re-used from the old church whilst the nave has a hammer beam roof.

Pevsner describes the reredos and altar designed by Austin and Paley as "extremely handsome" and "gorgeously painted" in gold, red and green by Shrigley and Hunt. Stained glass windows installed between 1887 and 1933 in the Lady chapel, south aisle and several in north aisle are also by Shrigley and Hunt while others including the west window are by Charles Eamer Kempe. The Speakman window is of interest as it depicts scenes from the industries on which Leigh was built, panels include weavers, engineers and colliers.

The organ case of 1910 is by Austin and Paley and from the old church there is a 1777 organ case by Samuel Green of London preserved on the vestry side of the church. The three manual organ was made in 1776–78 by Samuel Green, and repaired between 1807 and 1877 by Vincent of Liverpool. It was rebuilt in 1911 by Harrison & Harrison, using some of the original stops. In 1964 the pedal division was enlarged by the same company. The organ has been granted a Historic Organ Certificate Grade II*. Wooden fittings also saved from the earlier church include an altar table of 1705 by Thomas Naylor in the Lady Chapel and oak canopies from the churchwardens seats of 1686.

Over the nave near the tower is an 18th-century brass chandelier, "a cut above the norm" according to Pevsner, which was retained from the old church and converted to electricity.

== External features ==
The 18th-century boundary wall, gates and gate piers of the churchyard are designated as a Grade II listed building.

== Rectors and Vicars ==
The first parson on a list of rectors that starts in the reign of Richard I in the 12th century is John, Parson of Westleigh (1189–1199) but it is possible there was a church in Leigh at the time of the Norman Conquest.

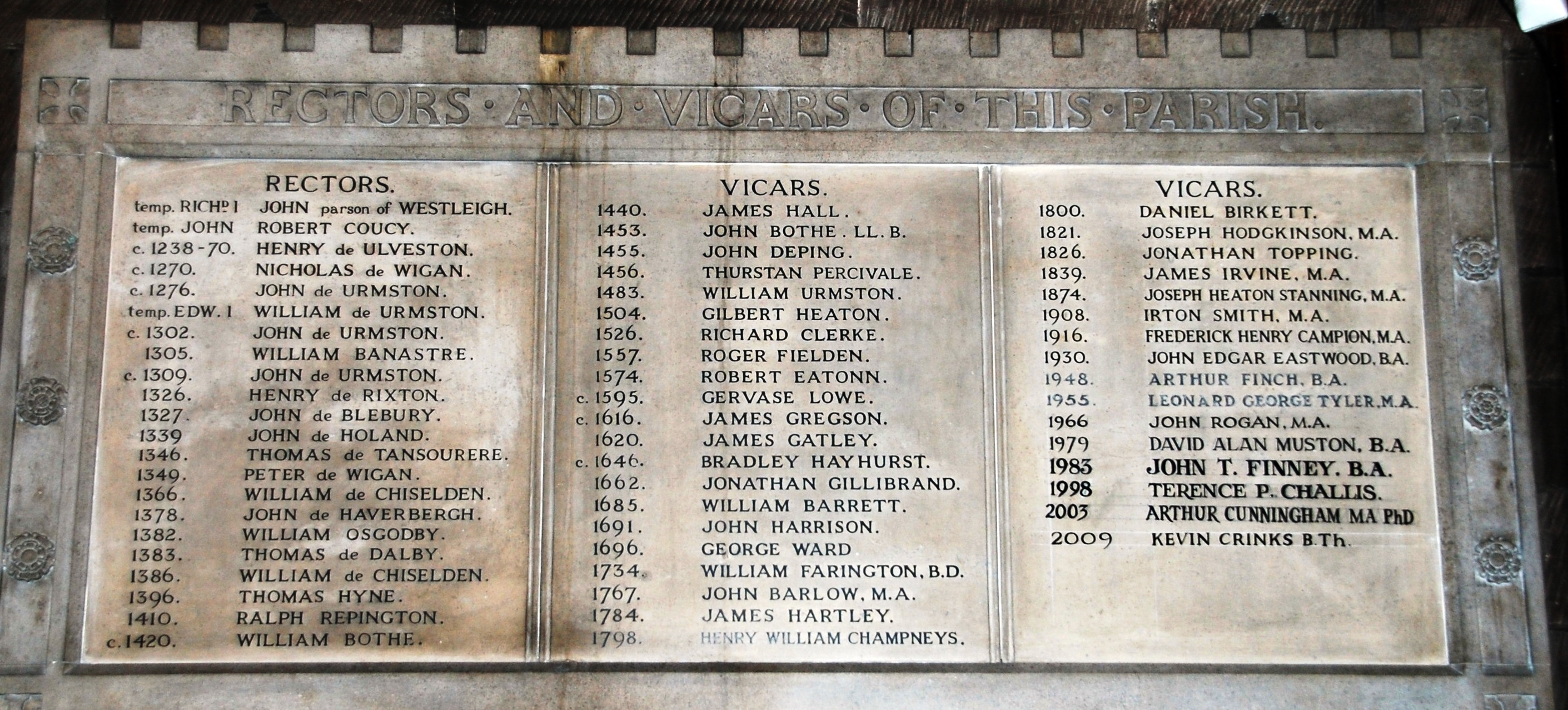
Rectors and Vicars of St Mary's

- Rectors
- temp. Richard I: John, parson of Westleigh
- temp. John: Robert Coucy
- 1240–70: Henry de Ulveston
- 1275: Nicholas de Wigan
- 1276: John de Urmston
- Edw. I: William de Urmston
- 1304: John de Urmston
- 1305: William Banastre
- 1309: John de Urmston
- 1326: Henry de Rixton
- 1327: John de Blebury
- 1339: John de Holand
- 1346: Thomas de Tansouere
- 1349: Peter de Wigan
- 1366: William de Chiselden
- 1378: John de Haverbergh
- 1382: William Osgodby
- 1383: Thomas de Dalby
- 1386: William de Chiselden
- 1396: Thomas Hyne
- 1410: Ralph Repington
- Vicars
- 1440: James Hall
- 1453: John Bothe, LL.B.
- 1455: John Deping
- 1456: Thurstan Percivall
- 1483: William Urmston
- 1504: Gilbert Heaton
- 1526: Richard Clerke
- 1557: Roger Feilden
- 1574: Robert Eaton
- 1595: Gervase Lowe
- 1616: James Gregson
- 1620: James Gatley
- 1646: Bradley Hayhurst
- 1662: Jonathan Gillibrand
- 1685: William Barrett
- 1691: John Harrison
- 1696: George Ward
- 1734: William Farington, B.D.
- 1767: John Barlow, M.A.
- 1784: James Hartley
- 1798: Henry William Champneys
- 1800: Daniel Birkett
- 1821: Joseph Hodgkinson, M.A.
- 1826: Jonathan Topping.
- 1839: James Irvine, M.A.
- 1874: Joseph Heaton Stanning, M.A.
- 1908: Irton Smith, M.A.
- 1916: Frederick Henry Campion, M.A.
- 1930: John Edgar Eastwood, B.A.
- 1948: Arthur Finch, B.A.
- 1955 Leonard George Tyler, M.A.
- 1966: John Rogan, M.A.
- 1979: David Alan Muston, B.A.
- 1983: John T. Finney, B.A.
- 1998: Terence P. Challis
- 2003: Arthur Cunningham. M.A. PhD.
- 2009: Kevin Crinks A.G.

== See also ==
- List of churches in Greater Manchester
- List of ecclesiastical works by Paley and Austin
- List of ecclesiastical works by Austin and Paley (1895–1914)
- Listed buildings in Leigh, Greater Manchester
