= Westleigh, Greater Manchester =

Suburb of Leigh, Greater Manchester, England

Coordinates: 53.507°N 2.532°W

Westleigh
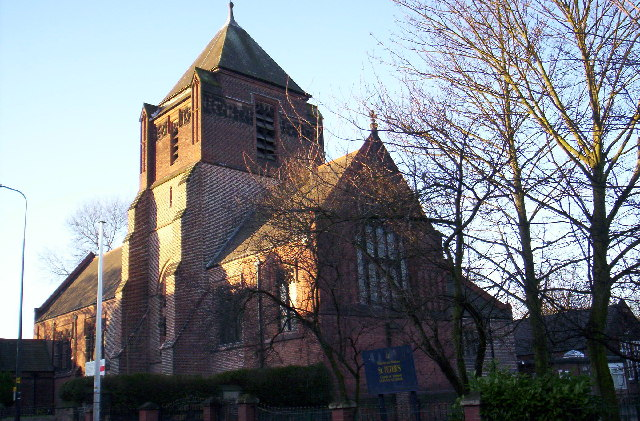
- St Peter's Church

- Location within Greater Manchester
- Metropolitan borough: Wigan
- Metropolitan county: Greater Manchester
- Region: North West
- Country: England
- Sovereign state: United Kingdom
- Post town: LEIGH
- Postcode district: WN7
- Dialling code: 01942
- Police: Greater Manchester
- Fire: Greater Manchester
- Ambulance: North West

Westleigh is a suburb of Leigh, in the Wigan district, in the county of Greater Manchester, England. It was one of three ancient townships, Westleigh, Bedford and Pennington, that merged in 1875 to form the borough of Leigh.

== History ==
=== Toponymy ===
The name Westleigh derives from the Old English and refers to the locality's relative position to Leigh. The name Leigh is derived from leah, meaning originally a "wood" then a "clearing" and finally a "meadow". It was recorded as Westeley in 1237, Westlegh in 1238 and Westlay in Legh in 1292.

=== Manor ===
The early history of Westleigh is closely involved with 'the church of Westley in Leigh', dedicated to St Peter on the Westleigh-Pennington boundary. This church was the centre of a large ecclesiastical parish, and after the Reformation dedicated to St Mary the Virgin, and is now the parish church in Leigh. The earliest recorded Lords of the Manor were the Westleigh family. They were followed by the Urmstons who held the manor for several centuries until the failure of the male line. Daughters of Richard Urmston married into the Heaton, Shuttleworth, and Bradshaw families who sold the manor to the Athertons and Hiltons. The manor eventually came into the Marsh family who made money from the silk and textile industries. The Marshes were benefactors of the township, giving money for the original swimming baths and Marsh Gymnasium as well as bequests to the Parish Church. Westleigh Old Hall was left to Leigh Corporation, the house demolished and the grounds became Marsh playing fields.

=== Industry ===
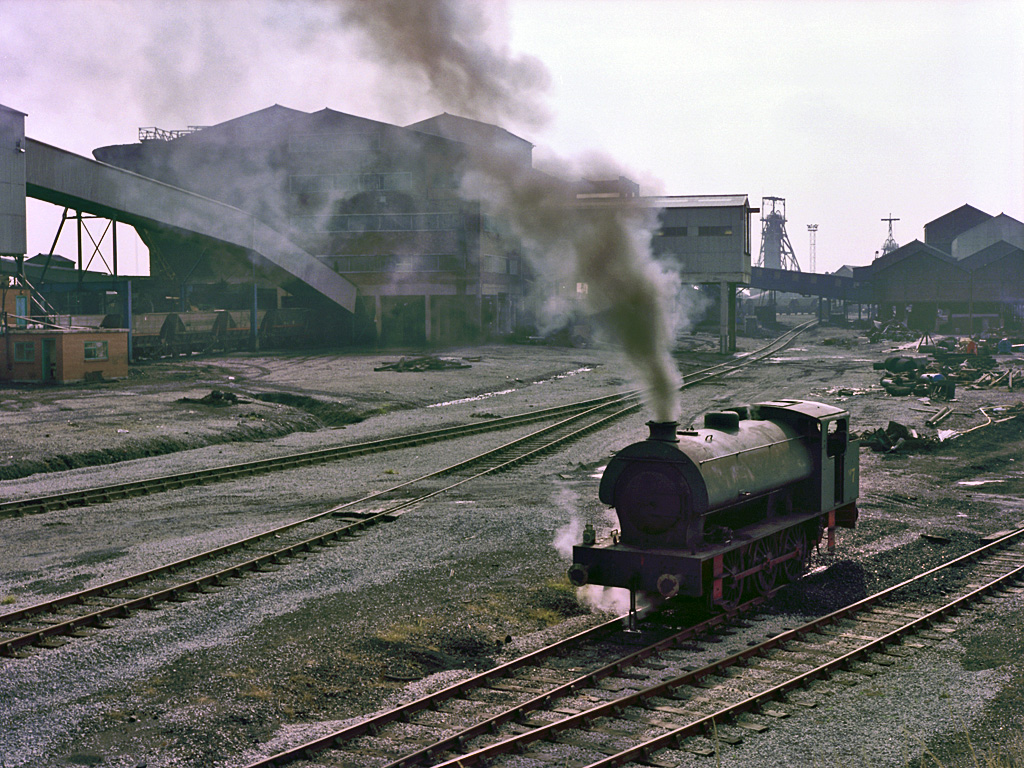
Locomotive at Bickershaw Colliery, Leigh

There were drift mines in Westleigh as early as the 12th century and in Leigh by 1851 there were 17 pits mainly in Westleigh each employing less than 10 colliers. The coal industry developed rapidly after 1870 with the onset of deep mines. In 1872 Ackers and Whitley began to develop the Bickershaw Colliery in neighbouring Pennington, accessed off Plank Lane, Westleigh which by 1970 employed 1,489 men who in that year produced 1,716,479 tons of coal. In 1896 the Westleigh pits of the Wigan Coal and Iron Company included Priestners which employed 387 underground and 70 on the surface, Snapes, and the Sovereign which had 180 underground and 68 on the surface. Parsonage Colliery was sunk by the Wigan Coal and Iron Company between 1913 and 1920 with shafts exceeding 1,000 yards in depth.

The cotton industry which replaced a domestic system of handloom weaving became more important with the building of Kirkhall Lane Mills (Westleigh New Mill) in 1836. Victoria Mills off Kirkhall Lane were built by James and John Hayes between 1856 and 1887 and Firs Mills were built by Tunnicliffe and Hampson.

== Governance ==
Westleigh
- History
  - Created: Middle Ages
  - Abolished: 1875
  - Succeeded by: Leigh Urban District
- Status: Township, civil parish

Westleigh was a township in the ancient ecclesiastical parish of Leigh in the hundred of West Derby in Lancashire. Under the terms of the Poor Law Amendment Act 1834 Westleigh formed part of the Leigh Poor Law Union, which was established on 26 January 1837 and responsible for an area covering the whole of the ancient parish of Leigh and part of Winwick. There were workhouses in Pennington, Culcheth, Tyldesley, and Lowton, but they were replaced by Leigh Union workhouse at Atherleigh in the 1850s. The Local Government Act 1858, and the Public Works (Manufacturing Districts) Act 1863, were adopted by the township in 1863. In 1866 West Leigh became a separate civil parish. In 1875, the district was dissolved and merged into the Leigh Local Board, which became an urban district council under the Local Government Act 1894 and West Leigh parish was abolished on 30 September to form Leigh and was incorporated in the Municipal Borough of Leigh. In 1891 the parish had a population of 10,928.

== Geography ==
Westleigh occupies the north west portion of Leigh, covering 1,882½ statute acres. The ground rises in undulations from 75 feet above sea level in the south to 150 feet in the north and northwest. The Westleigh Brook crosses the township from north to south and joins with the Hey or Pennington Brook, flowing from the west. The geological formation consists of coal measures in the north, under the Permian rocks which outcrop from Westleigh village to Westleigh Heath and Strange Common. To the south east the formation consists of the pebble beds of the new red sandstone series. There are several small flashes, small lakes created in the 20th century by coal mining subsidence and flooding.

== Transport ==
The Wigan and Leigh branch of the Leeds and Liverpool Canal crosses the south of the township from west to east, and the road from Hindley to Atherton (A577) crosses to the north of Westleigh with a branch road to Leigh running south. The Bolton and Leigh Railway line reached Westleigh in March 1830 and was extended across the Leeds and Liverpool Canal to Kenyon Junction on the Liverpool and Manchester Railway. Leigh Station on the Bolton and Leigh Railway at Westleigh was opened to passengers in June 1831. The line of the railway is now the route of the A579 road. The Manchester–Southport line of the London and North Western Railway crossed the northern part of Westleigh.

== Religion ==
The foundation stone of St. Paul's Westleigh, a chapel of ease of Leigh Parish Church, was laid in June 1846 and the church consecrated in October 1847. It is built in the decorated style and stands on land given by Lord Lilford, who also provided the stone used to build it. Westleigh St Paul's became a district chapelry in the parish of Leigh in 1881.

Westleigh St Peter was founded 1881 is on Firs Lane. It is a Grade II* listed building by Paley and Austin, built in brick with red sandstone dressings.

A growing Roman Catholic population in the area led to the building of Our Lady of the Rosary in Plank Lane in 1879, Twelve Apostles in 1879, and Sacred Heart in 1929.
