= List of people from the Metropolitan Borough of Wigan =

This is a list of people from the English village of Wigan and people live in and born in Wigan.

The demonym of Wigan is Wiganers; however, this list may include people from the wider Metropolitan Borough of Wigan—from Ashton-in-Makerfield, Hindley, Ince-in-Makerfield, Atherton, Leigh, Tyldesley, and other areas in the borough. The demonym is also Wiganians. This list is arranged alphabetically by surname:

Table of contents:
A B C D E F G H I J K L M N O P Q R S T U V W X Y Z
See also • References

== A ==
- Andy Ainscow (born 1968), former footballer
- James Anderton (1932–2022), former chief constable of Greater Manchester Police
- Richard Ashcroft (born 1971), lead singer of The Verve, born in Billinge
- Chris Ashton (born 1987), England rugby league and rugby union international, born in Wigan
- Bill Ashurst (1948–2022), rugby league footballer of the 1960s and 1970s for Great Britain, Lancashire, Wigan, Penrith Panthers, Wakefield Trinity, and Runcorn Highfield, born in Wigan

== B ==
- David Banks, (born 1967) indoor/outdoor footballer and manager
- Alan R. Battersby, (1925–2018), organic chemist and Fellow of the Royal Society, and known for his work on the genetic blueprint, structure, and synthetic pathway of Cyanocobalamin.
- Tom Billington (1958–2018), professional wrestler used the ring name Dynamite Kid, one half of tag-team The British Bulldogs with Davey Boy Smith, born in Golborne
- Margery Booth (1906–1952), opera singer and World War II spy, born in Wigan
- Thomas Burke (1890–1969), international operatic tenor; born in Leigh in 1890 and attended St Joseph's School in Leigh; the Leigh Wetherspoon's pub is named after him
- Kay Burley (born 1960), presenter and newsreader on Sky News, born in Beech Hill, Wigan
- James Burton (1784–1868), cotton merchant, built several early cotton mills in Hindsford and Tyldesley, born in Clitheroe

== C ==
- Duncan Cleworth, (born 1957), swimmer, competed in the 1976 Summer Olympics in Montreal, member of Tyldesley Swimming Club.

== D ==
- Percy Dowse (1898–1970), former Mayor of Lower Hutt, New Zealand
- Kathleen Drew-Baker (1901–1957), psychologist, born in Leigh
- Kathryn Drysdale (born 1981), actress, played Louise Brooks in Two Pints of Lager and a Packet of Crisps

== E ==
- Edith Edmonds (1874-1951), artist, used oils and watercolours for still-life and landscape paintings
- Shaun Edwards (born 1966), rugby league player and coach of London Wasps rugby union coach; Wales national rugby union team defence coach
- Greg Ellis (born 1968), actor and voiceover artist
- Edward Entwistle (1815-1909), driver of Stephenson's Rocket

== F ==
- Georgie Fame (born 1943), R&B singer and keyboard player, born in Leigh
- Joseph Farington (1747–1821), watercolour artist, diarist and Royal Academician was born in Leigh where his father was the vicar.
- Andy Farrell (born 1975), former international rugby player of both codes, born and raised in Wigan and current head coach of the Ireland rugby union team
- Brian Finch (1936–2007), Wigan-born script-writer who contributed 151 episodes of Coronation Street over a period of 12 years
- Henry Finch (1633–1704), Presbyterian minister ejected from Church of England, born in Standish
- Phil Fletcher (born 1976), puppeteer
- George Formby (1904–1961), comedian, ukulele player and actor

== G ==
- Joe Gormley, Baron Gormley (1917–1993), former president of the National Union of Mineworkers
- Andy Gregory (born 1961), former Wigan rugby league player, born in Ince in Makerfield, now lives in Ashton in Makerfield.
- Mike Gregory (1964–2007), former Great Britain national rugby league team and Warrington Wolves captain, former Wigan Warriors coach, born in Wigan
- John Grimshaw (1893–1980), recipient of the Victoria Cross, Lieutenant-Colonel in The Lancashire Fusiliers
- David Grindley (born 1972), former 400m runner, team bronze medallist at the 1992 Summer Olympics

== H ==
- Eddie Halliwell (born 1979 or 1980), disc jockey
- Roger Hampson (1925–1996), artist, printmaker and teacher, born in Tyldesley
- Keith Harris (born October 1951), music industry consultant & artist manager, former chair of UK Music's Diversity & Equality Taskforce, grew up in Wigan.
- Thomas Highs (1718–1803), inventor of cotton spinning machinery, born in Leigh
- James Hilton (1900–1954), author, wrote of Goodbye, Mr Chips, born in Leigh
- Arthur John Hope (1875–1960), architect and partner in Bradshaw Gass & Hope, was born and lived in Atherton

== I ==
- James Lawrence Isherwood (1917–1989), prolific impressionist/expressionist painter
- Robert Isherwood (1845-1905), born in Tyldesley, was the local miners' agent and treasurer of the Lancashire and Cheshire Miners' Federation.

== K ==
- Shaun Keaveny (born 1972), radio broadcaster, born in Leigh, once broadcast his BBC 6 Music breakfast show live from Leigh Library
- Thomas Kershaw (1819–1898), pioneer in creating imitation marble, born in Standish
- Roy Kinnear (1934–1988), comedy actor, born in Wigan
- Victoria Knowles (born 1976), author of bestselling ebook The PA

== L ==
- Eric Roberts Laithwaite (1921–1997), engineer, known for his development of the linear induction motor and Maglev rail system
- John Lennard-Jones (1894–1954), mathematician and physicist, born in Leigh and attended Leigh Grammar School, Fellow of the Royal Society.
- Limahl (born 1958), real name Christopher Hamill, pop rock/dance vocalist, lead singer of Kajagoogoo
- James Lindsay, 24th Earl of Crawford (1783–1869), Earl of Balcarres, Army officer and politician, built Haigh Hall
- Luke Lowe (1889–?), Wigan-born football player. He briefly played in the Football League Second Division.

== M ==
- Barry Mason
- Paul Mason (born 1960), journalist and broadcaster, born in Leigh.
- Ian McKellen (born 1939), screen and stage actor, who lived in Wigan for most of his first 12 years.
- Jennifer Moss (1945-2006), actress best known for playing Lucille Hewitt in Coronation Street.
- Ian Murphy (born 1963), artist and art educator

== N ==
- Walter Napier (1875–?), English professional footballer
- Fred Norris (1921–2006) who worked underground at Cleworth Hall Colliery in Tyldesley competed as long-distance runner at the 1952 Helsinki and 1956 Melbourne Olympics.

== O ==
- Sean O’Loughlin (born 1982), former rugby league player and captain for Wigan Warriors and Great Britain
- Edward Ormerod (1834–1894), mining engineer at Gibfield Colliery; invented the Ormerod detaching hook, an important mining safety device

== P ==
- Mary Pownall (1862–1937), sculptor, was the daughter of James Pownall the silk manufacturer. She was born and raised in Leigh.
- James Caldwell Prestwich (1852–1940), architect, born in Atherton, who designed many of Leigh's buildings including the town hall.

== R ==
- Kris Radlinski (born 1976), former rugby league player for Wigan Warriors and Great Britain, and current CEO of the club.
- Frank Randle (1901–1957), comedian, born in Aspull
- Ted Ray (1905–1977), comedian, had a BBC radio show Ray's a Laugh which ran for 12 years, born in Wigan.
- John Roby (1793–1850), folklorist, banker, poet, and writer.

== S ==
- Andy Saunders (born 1974), author and NASA image restorer.
- Pete Shelley (1955–2018), born Peter Campbell McNeish in Leigh, singer, songwriter and guitarist with the Buzzcocks.
- Nigel Short (born 1965), chess grandmaster, grew up in Atherton and attended St Philip's School
- Davey Boy Smith (1962–2002), professional wrestler for the WWF and WCW as The British Bulldog
- Danny Sonner (born 1972), Wigan-born association football player who has represented Northern Ireland national football team
- John Stopford, Baron Stopford of Fallowfield (1888–1961), physician and anatomist, Vice-Chancellor of the University of Manchester

== T ==
- George Taylor (1920–1983), born in Wigan, footballer
- Bryan Talbot (born 1952), comics artist and writer, born in Wigan.
- Georgia Taylor (born 1980), actress best known for playing Toyah Battersby in Coronation Street
- Ella Toone (born 1999), born in Wigan, footballer for England
- Addin Tyldesley (1878–1962), born in Tyldesley, member of the town's swimming and water polo club, competed in the 1908 Summer Olympics in London.
- Elizabeth Tyldesley, (1585–1654) the daughter of Thomas Tyldesley of Morleys Hall, Astley, was a 17th-century abbess at the Poor Clare Convent at Gravelines.
- Thomas Tyldesley (1612–1651), soldier, died in the Battle of Wigan Lane

== W ==
- Charles Walmesley (1722–1797), Roman Catholic Titular Bishop of Rama; born in Langtree
- Dave Whelan (born 1936), businessman nicknamed Mr Wigan, founder of JJB Sports, former owner of both Wigan Athletic and Wigan Warriors
- Katie White (born 1983), member of The Ting Tings, born and brought up in Lowton
- Danny Wilson (born 1960), Wigan-born association football player and manager
- Gerrard Winstanley (1609–1676), Protestant religious reformer, political philosopher and founder of the 17th-century Diggers, born in Wigan.
- James Wood (1672–1759), Presbyterian minister of the first Atherton and Chowbent Chapels, led a force that successfully defended the bridge over the River Ribble at Walton le Dale in the Battle of Preston in 1715.
- Thomas Woodcock (1888–1918), recipient of the Victoria Cross, Lance Corporal in the Irish Guards, born in Wigan
- Caleb Wright (1810–1898), MP for Leigh, 1885-1895, and mill owner who built Barnfield Mills in Tyldesley
- Witness, an English rock band from Wigan

== See also ==
- Hacker T. Dog (from 2009), fictional dog from Wigan
- Wallace and Gromit (from 1989), fictional residents of Wigan
- List of people from Greater Manchester
