= 1936 in architecture =

The year 1936 in architecture involved some significant events.

== Events ==
- May 27 – RMS Queen Mary begins her maiden Atlantic crossing. Interior design, under the direction of E. C. Leach, is by Arthur Joseph Davis and J. C. Whipp of Mewès & Davis (UK) and Benjamin Wistar Morris (USA) with much craftsmanship undertaken by the Bromsgrove Guild of Applied Arts.
- July 20 – At the outbreak of the Spanish Civil War, mobs break into the unfinished church of Sagrada Família in Barcelona, destroying much of architect Antoni Gaudí's workshops, models and drawings and wrecking the crypt where he is buried.
- October – Rose Connor opens her own architectural practice in Pasadena, California.
- October 29 – Construction of Via della Conciliazione in Rome begins.

== Buildings and structures ==
=== Buildings ===
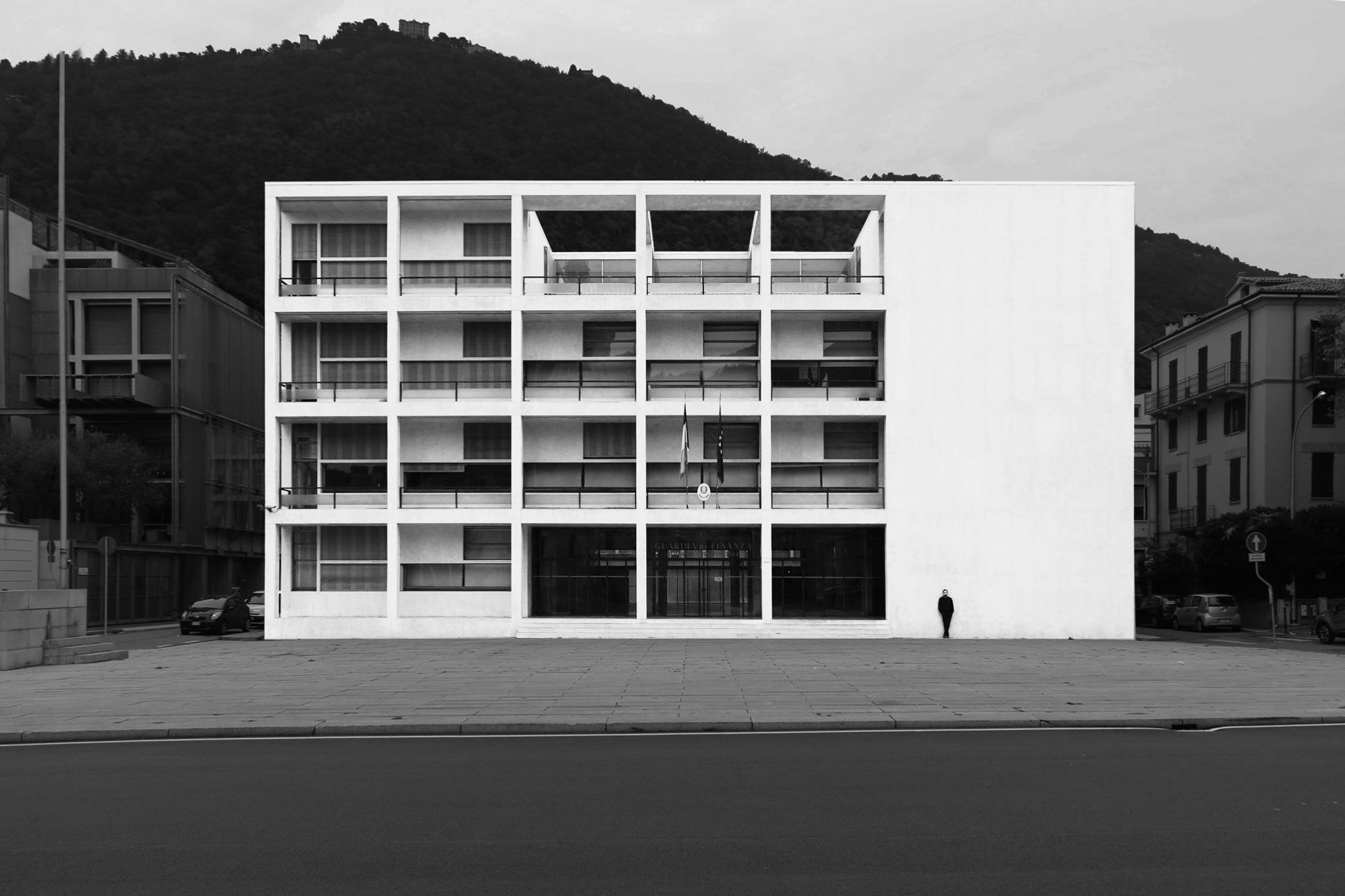
Casa del Fascio (Como), Italy

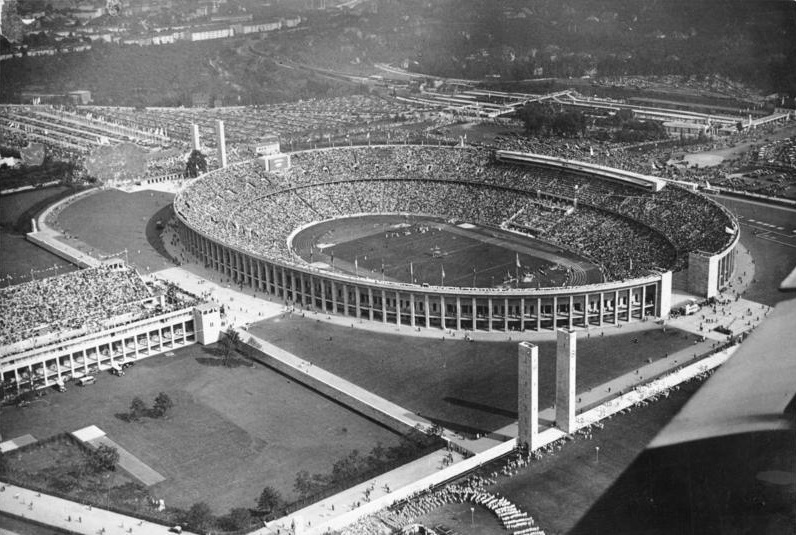
Olympic Stadium (Berlin)

- Johnson Wax Headquarters, Racine, Wisconsin, designed by Frank Lloyd Wright.
- Campana Factory, Batavia, Illinois, designed by Frank D. Chase and Childs & Smith, built.
- Owens-Illinois Glass Company building in Toledo, Ohio, built.
- George Rogers Clark Memorial in Vincennes, Indiana by Frederic Charles Hirons dedicated.
- Lasipalatsi "temporary" office and commercial building in Helsinki, Finland, designed by Viljo Revell, Heimo Riihimäki and Niilo Kokko, built.
- Peter Jones (department store) in London, designed by William Crabtree of Slater, Crabtree and Moberly, completed.
- Casa Bloc (workers' apartments), Barcelona, designed by Josep Lluís Sert, completed.
- Casa del Fascio (Como), designed by Giuseppe Terragni, completed.
- Vytautas the Great War Museum in Kaunas, Lithuania completed.
- Olympic Stadium (Berlin), designed by Werner March, opened.
- Mounts Baths, Northampton, England, designed by James Caldwell Prestwich, built.
- Tilkka military hospital, Helsinki, Finland, designed by Olavi Sortta, completed.
- Florin Court (apartments), London, designed by Guy Morgan and Partners.
- Pullman Court (apartments), London, designed by Frederick Gibberd in 1933, completed.
- 'Beehive' terminal at Gatwick Airport, England, designed by Frank Hoar of Hoar, Marlow & Lovett, opened.
- Airship hangar at Bartolomeu de Gusmão Airport, Rio de Janeiro, Brazil opened.
- Zwickau Hauptbahnhof (railway station), Germany, designed by Otto Falk, opened.
- Campion Hall, Oxford (college), England, designed by Edwin Lutyens, opened.
- Church of St Monica, Bootle, England, designed by F. X. Velarde.
- Kenwood House, Nairobi, Kenya, designed by Ernst May.
- The Laughing Water roadhouse, Cobham, Kent, England, designed by Clough Williams-Ellis, built.
- The Maybury roadhouse, Edinburgh, designed by Paterson & Broom, opened.
- Obelisk of Buenos Aires designed by Alberto Prebisch.
- Canadian National Vimy Memorial, designed by Walter Seymour Allward, dedicated.
- 5 Frug Street, White City (Tel Aviv), Mandatory Palestine, designed by Yehuda Liolka.
- British General Post Office K6 'Jubilee' red telephone box, designed by Giles Gilbert Scott, introduced.
- Cairo Flats (apartments), Melbourne, by Australian modernist architect Best Overend, completed.

== Awards ==
- Olympic gold medal – Hermann Kutschera of Austria for Skistadium.
- Olympic silver medal – Werner March of Germany for National sports field.
- Olympic bronze medal – Hermann Stieglholzer and Herbert Kastinger of Austria for Fighting site in Vienna.
- RIBA Royal Gold Medal – Charles Holden.
- Grand Prix de Rome, architecture: André Remondet for a naval museum.

== Births ==
- March 17 – Juha Leiviskä, Finnish architect
- April 17 – Verma Panton, Jamaican architect (died 2015)
- July 25 – Glenn Murcutt, English-born Australian architect
- October 4 – Christopher Alexander, Viennese-born architect
- December 14 – Frank Williams, American architect (died 2010)

== Deaths ==
- June 29 – Luigi Manini, Italian architect and stage designer also working in Portugal (born 1848)
- September 17 – Edward Hudson, English architectural publisher and patron (born 1854)
- December 17 – Philip Mainwaring Johnston, English architect (born 1865)
