= Ainscow =

Ainscow is an English surname. Notable people with the surname include:

- Alan Ainscow (born 1953), English footballer
- Andy Ainscow (born 1968), English footballer
- Mel Ainscow (born 1943), English academic
