= Ian Murphy =

Ian Murphy may refer to:

- Ian Murphy (writer) (1978–2019), American artist, satirist, and gonzo journalist
- Ian Murphy (soccer) (born 2000), American soccer player
- Ian Murphy (artist) (born 1963), British artist
- Ian Murphy, character in The Beat (1988 film)
- Ian Murphy (athlete), Puerto-Rican discus thrower in the 1938 Central American and Caribbean Games
