= Listed buildings in Leigh, Greater Manchester =

Leigh is a town in the Metropolitan Borough of Wigan, Greater Manchester, England. The town, together with its suburbs of Bedford, Westleigh and Pennington, contains 33 listed buildings that are recorded in the National Heritage List for England. Of these, four are listed at Grade II*, the middle of the three grades, and the others are at Grade II, the lowest grade.

Leigh is an industrial town, its main industry being textiles. The industries were supplied by the Bridgewater Canal and the Leeds and Liverpool Canal which make a junction in the town, and a bridge crossing the Bridgewater Canal is listed. Some textile mills and warehouses have survived and are listed. The other listed buildings include houses, farmhouses and farm buildings, churches and associated structures, public houses, an obelisk, banks, civic buildings, and war memorials.

== Key ==
Grade	Criteria
II*	Particularly important buildings of more than special interest
II	Buildings of national importance and special interest

== Buildings ==
Name and location	Photograph	Date	Notes	Grade
Bedford Hall; 53.48607°N 2.49247°W	—	Late medieval	A farmhouse later converted into two private houses, it is basically timber framed and encased in brick with a roof of stone and slate. The building has two storeys and an H-shaped plan, with a main range and two cross-wings, and a two-storey porch in the angle. The windows are mullioned and transomed, and there are some later additions and modifications.	II
St Mary's Church; 53.49830°N 2.51966°W		1516	The oldest part of the church is the tower, the body being rebuilt in 1869–73 by Paley and Austin in Perpendicular style, and a vestry was added in 1910–11 by Austin and Paley. The church is in sandstone with a lead roof. It consists of a nave and chancel under a continuous roof with a clerestory, north and south aisles, a south porch, a chapel, a chancel with a north vestry, and a west tower. The tower has a west door, a three-light west window, clock faces, and an embattled parapet. At the corners of the chancel are octagonal piers with pinnacles, and along the top of the church is an embattled parapet.	II*
Light Oaks Hall; 53.46615°N 2.49014°W		Early 17th century	Part of the house was demolished in about 1947. The remaining part is in brick with sandstone dressings and a slate roof. It has two storeys, two bays, a small rear wing, and a 20th-century extension at the rear. The upper floor is decorated with brick diapering. The doorway has a chamfered surround and a four-centred arch, and the windows are mullioned with hood moulds.	II*
The George and Dragon; 53.49617°N 2.51907°W		Mid-17th century	The public house has since been altered. It is in brick with a slate roof, and has two storeys and two gabled bays, with applied timber framing to the upper floor. The doorway has a wooden surround, and the windows on the front are sashes with projecting sills and wedge lintels; elsewhere the windows are casements. The gables have bargeboards and finials.	II
Yew Tree Farmhouse; 53.47641°N 2.52669°W	—	c. 1700–1710	The farmhouse, which was altered in the 20th century, is in red brick with a Welsh slate roof. There are two storeys, a double-depth plan, and a front of two gabled bays. The doorway has a fanlight, and in the gables is decorative brickwork in the form of hearts. Most of the windows are casements, and at the rear is a mullioned window.	II
Hawkhurst Farmhouse; 53.47929°N 2.48889°W	—	Early 18th century	A brick farmhouse, the lower storey rendered, with a brick band and a stone-slate roof. There are two storeys, two bays, a later single-bay wing to the left, and a later gabled porch. The windows are casements with stone sills and cambered brick arches. There are external steps in the left wing leading to a doorway on the upper floor. Inside the farmhouse is an inglenook and a bressumer.	II
Barn and shippon, Hawkhurst Farm; 53.47944°N 2.48925°W	—	18th century	The barn and shippon are in brick with a roof partly of slate and partly of metal. The shippon is the older, it has three bays and three doors. To the right is a 19th-century barn with opposed cart entries, tiers of honeycomb vents, and later buttresses.	II
Walls, gates and gate piers, St Mary's Church; 53.49800°N 2.51978°W	—	18th century	The walls enclose the east, south and west sides of the churchyard. They are low stone walls with coping stones that sweep up to the gate piers. The pier on the south side are square with moulded caps and bases. There are also piers on the west and southeast sides that have bold finials, and may be earlier.	II
Former canal warehouse (Waterside Inn); 53.49433°N 2.52171°W		Late 18th century	A pair of adjoining canal warehouses adjacent to the Bridgewater Canal, the later one built in 1894, and subsequently converted into a public house. The earlier warehouse is in stone with a stone-slate roof, two storeys and four bays. It contains segmental-arched loading doors, mullioned windows, and a two-storey canted bay window. The later warehouse is larger and taller, in brick with dentilled eaves and a slate roof with coped gables. It has three storeys and five bays, and contains casement windows with segmental heads, and central loading doors under a gable. At the rear is a large projecting canopy.	II
Hall House Bridge; 53.49160°N 2.48918°W		c. 1795	An accommodation bridge over the Bridgewater Canal, it is in brick with stone dressings, and consists of a single elliptical arch. The bridge has brick voussoirs, a stone band, and stone copings partly replaced in brick.	II
5 Wild's Passage; 53.49423°N 2.51933°W	—	c. 1800	A former weaver's house and workshop, it is in red brick with a stone-slate roof. There are three storeys, a double-depth plan, and two bays. The central doorway has ribbed pilasters and a fanlight, and the windows have projecting stone sills and wedge lintels.	II
1, 3, 5, 7, 9, 11 and 13 Higginson Street; 53.49669°N 2.50813°W	—	c. 1840	A terrace of seven former silk workers' houses in brick with a hipped slate roof. They have two storeys, a single-depth plan, and one bay each, except for No. 1 which has two bays. The doorways have round-headed arches, and the windows, most of which are sashes, have stone sills and lintels.	II
Fairfield Private Hotel; 53.49164°N 2.52210°W	—	c. 1840	Originally a house, later used for other purposes, it is in red brick on a plinth, with a sill band, an eaves cornice, and a hipped Welsh slate roof. There are two storeys with attics, three bays at the front and two at the sides, a two-storey one-bay wing at the right rear, and a kitchen wing in the angle. The central porch has a corniced transom and a fanlight in a keyed archivolt. The windows are sashes; in the outer bays they have architraves and flat heads. The window above the porch has a keyed archivolt, and in the left return is a French window.	II
Christ Church; 53.49130°N 2.52262°W		1850–1854	The church, designed by E. H. Shellard in Gothic Revival style, is in stone with a slate roof. It consists of a nave with a clerestory, north and south aisles, a south porch, a chancel, and a west tower. The tower has three stages, diagonal buttressesm and an embattled parapet with crocketed corner pinnacles.	II
St Joseph's Church; 53.49434°N 2.50875°W		1855	A Roman Catholic church designed by Joseph Hansom in Gothic Revival style, it is in stone with a slate roof. The church consists of a nave, a south porch, a short chancel with a polygonal apse, north and south chapels, a sacristy, and a west tower. The tower has three stages, angle buttresss, a saddleback roof, an octagonal stair turret, a west doorway, a statue in a niche, elaborate corner pinnacles and a statue between them on the west side. The windows contain Geometrical tracery.	II
Obelisk; 53.49779°N 2.51924°W		1859	The obelisk stands on the site of the market cross. It has an 18th-century rusticated pedestal with a base and a moulded cap. The obelisk has a tapering shaft with sunken panels on each face.	II
Holly Bank; 53.50619°N 2.50982°W	—	1873	A house, then a convent, in red brick with blue brick banding, stone dressings, sill bands, and a Welsh slate roof. There are two storeys, four bays, a double-depth plan, and a rear single-bay service wing. The outer bays are gabled with bargeboards. On the ground floor are canted bay windows with shallow parapets, and above are three-light windows with hood moulds and round-headed attic windows. The central bays contain shallow bay windows with hipped roofs, and above are paired windows with pointed heads, and gabled dormers with bargeboards and finials.	II
St Peter's Church, Westleigh; 53.49842°N 2.53762°W		1879–1881	The church, designed by Paley and Austin in Decorated style, is in brick with red sandstone dressings and a slate roof with coped gables. It consists of a nave, a north aisle, a south porch, a chancel, a north vestry and a tower at the crossing. The tower has buttresses, an ashlar frieze, and a pyramidal roof. The porch has an arched doorway and a niche with a statue above.	II*
Mather Lane Mill; 53.49314°N 2.51020°W		1882	The former cotton mill, designed by Bradshaw & Gass, is in red brick. The main block has six storeys and a basement, and sides of ten and six bays, with a partly internal engine house to the north, and a tower to the northeast. To the south are carding sheds with three storeys and a basement. At the corners are panelled pilasters. The tower is also panelled and contains a large lunette, and has a parapet and a pyramidal roof.	II
Former warehouse, Mather Lane; 53.49314°N 2.51020°W		c. 1882	The former warehouse to the Mather Lane Mill is adjacent to the Bridgewater Canal, and is in brick on a moulded plinth, with bands and a parapet. It has two storeys to the road, three to the canal, and eight bays along the road. There are taking-in doors with the parapet raised and shaped above them.	II
Boar's Head public house 53.49817°N 2.51873°W		1900	The public house is in red brick on a projecting plinth, with terracotta dressings, bands, Ionic columns, a coped parapet, and a green slate roof. It is in eclectic Baroque style, and has two storeys and fronts of four and five bays. On the left corner is a lead-covered cupola, and on the right corner is a gable with ball finials and a keyed oculus. Between these is a round-headed doorway with a fanlight and round-headed windows on the ground floor, and canted and bow oriel windows on the upper floor.	II
Stables, Boar's Head public house 53.49817°N 2.51801°W	—	c. 1900	The stables are in red brick with dressings in Accrington brick and slate roofs. They have two storeys and an L-shaped plan. There are various openings, including doorways, windows, vents, a vehicular entrance, and a taking-in door.	II
Yorkshire Bank and Chambers; 53.49625°N 2.51938°W	—	c. 1900	The ground floor of the bank is in red sandstone on a granite plinth, the upper floors are in brick and terracotta, and there is a Westmorland slate roof. There are two storeys with attics, six bays on King Street, five on Downing Street, and beyond that are the two-storey three-bay bank chambers. The doorway to the right has rusticated pilasters, an archivolt with a keystone, and a segmental pediment on foliated consoles. To the left are five windows with Doric columns between. On the upper floor are round-headed windows with triangular piers between, above which is a decorated frieze. In the roof are two dormer windows, one under a gable with a ball finial, and the other under a large shaped gable with a coat of arms and a segmental pediment with ball finials.	II
St Thomas' Church; 53.49508°N 2.50748°W		1902–03	The church was completed and the tower added in 1909–10. It is in red Accrington brick with dressings in Runcorn sandstone and roofs of Coniston slate. The church consists of a nave with a clerestory, north and south aisles, north and south transepts, a chancel with a north vestry and a south chapel, and a northwest tower. The tower, which is 78 feet (24 m) tall, has four stages, corner buttresses, clock faces in diamond surrounds, a decorated cornice with gargoyles, and a richly carved and embattled parapet. The churchyard wall is in red brick with sandstone copings, and it contains an arched lychgate, also in brick and sandstone and with a slate roof.	II
Town Hall; 53.49735°N 2.51918°W		1904–1907	The town hall is in sandstone, it has a hipped slate roof, and is in Edwardian Baroque style. The building has a U-shaped plan, it is in two and three storeys, and has a main front of eight bays on Market Place, and seven bays along Market Street. The symmetrical main front has giant pilasters, a modillioned cornice, and a central porch with a semicircular dentilled pediment on blocked columns. There are more blocked columns on the upper floor, and on the roof is a belvedere and a cupola. On the corner is an octagonal turret, and along Market Street are shops on the ground floor, the end bays are gabled, and there are three oriel windows.	II
Butts Mill; 53.49092°N 2.50272°W		1905	A cotton spinning mill by Stott and Sons in red brick and terracotta with an internal structure of steel frames and concrete floors. It consists of a six-storey rectangular block with a corner stair tower, and a hoist tower in the centre of the south side. The stair tower has Arts and Crafts details, clasping buttresses, and at the top is a scalloped terracotta parapet and a copper dome with a finial. The hoist tower has the name of the mill in white tiling. The lower three storeys of the main block have continuous glazing, and on the upper floors windows and brick panels alternate.	II
Chatham House; 53.50696°N 2.51813°W		c. 1905	The building is in red brick, partly roughcast, with sandstone dressings and a hipped Welsh slate roof with red ridge tiles. There are two storeys and a symmetrical front. The central bay projects and has a coped gable. On the ground floor is a five-light mullioned and transomed window, and above are windows with keystones. In the outer bays are canted bay windows, and above these are windows forming half-dormers under segmental heads.	II
Alder Mill office and gate 53.49258°N 2.49913°W		1907	The office wing of the mill, which has been demolished, is by Abraham Henthorn Stott Junior. It is in red brick on a plinth of blue brick, with bands in yellow brick and dressings in yellow terracotta. There is one storey and sides of eight and four bays. On the corner is a tower containing a doorway with a fanlight and an archivolt, and surmounted by a copper dome. Most of the windows have segmental heads with keystones and above them is a cornice and a parapet sweeping between posts. On the front are blind mullioned windows above the cornice. At the entrance are elaborate cast iron gates and piers with moulded Art Nouveau decoration.	II
Fire station 53.49968°N 2.51991°W		1907	The fire station and the house to the left are in red brick with terracotta dressings and have Welsh slate roofs. The house has two storeys and two bays, the fire station is taller with two storeys and five bays, and there is a four-storey tower at the rear. The house has a two-storey bay window on the left, and a canopy above the door and a single-storey bay window to the right. On the ground floor of the fire station are five segmental arched openings, above are two shaped gables, and on the left is a semi-octagonal oriel window rising to form an embattled turret. The tower has a modillioned cornice and a parapet with rounded corner turrets.	II
National Westminster Bank; 53.49667°N 2.51929°W		1908	The bank, originally Parr's Bank, is in Portland stone on a plinth with a slate roof. It is on a corner site, and has three storeys with attics, three bays on Railway Road, eight bays on Market Street, and a canted bay on the corner. In the corner bay is a doorway with an architrave, a keystone and a segmental pediment. At the top of the building is an entablature with a pulvinated frieze, a modillioned cornice, and a coped parapet. Other features include a rusticated ground floor, first floor casement windows with open segmental pediments, and oculi.	II
Leigh Mill; 53.49289°N 2.49302°W		1913	A double cotton spinning mill by Bradshaw Gass & Hope, with the west block added in 1923. There are two blocks with an internal metal frame, in red brick with yellow brick banding, and a dentilled attic sill cornice. Each block has six storeys and sides of ten and seven bays, each with a corner tower, the southeast tower also with a slate cupola. There are also offices of two and three storeys, engine houses and a boiler house. Between the block is a tall chimney with a cap.	II*
Westleigh war memorial 53.49829°N 2.53772°W		1919	The war memorial is in the churchyard of St Peter's Church. The memorial is in stone and consists of a stepped stone plinth and a tapering square shaft on which is the standing figure of a soldier in battledress with a bowed head. On the plinth is an inscription and the names of those lost in the First World War.	II
War memorial, Silk Street; 53.49774°N 2.51628°W		1922	The war memorial stands in the centre of a square, it is in Portland stone, and consists of a cenotaph with a plinth on a stepped stylobate. On two sides are bronze plaques in architraves with wreaths above, and flanked by engaged columns with fluted shafts and palm-leaf capitals. Above this are an inscribed frieze, a dentilled cornice and a stylised coffin. On the sides are carved swords and bronze pikes.	II
