= Neulichterfelde =

Neulichterfelde is a planned and highly controversial residential neighborhood in the Berlin district of Steglitz-Zehlendorf, Germany, located on a former U.S. military training ground (Parks Range) in West Berlin.

== Background ==
The history of Neulichterfelde is marked by a varied use of the site where the new urban quarter is to be developed. Originally, the area consisted of agricultural land acquired in 1928 by the German Reichsbahn to build a railway repair facility—a project that was never realized. During World War II, the site housed a Reichsbahn labor camp as well as a prisoner-of-war camp that formed part of the Stalag III-D complex. After the war, the area remained unused for a long time until it came into focus for urban development in the 2010s. As part of a master planning process starting in 2013, the site was identified as a potential location for a sustainable residential neighborhood. The site's historical burden due to its Nazi-era past sparked intense debates about how to integrate remembrance culture into the new development

== Planning status ==
Planning for the Neulichterfelde urban quarter began as early as 2012 and culminated, after twelve years of intensive coordination, workshops, and public participation, in the adoption of the zoning plan by the Steglitz-Zehlendorf district council in March 2024. This clears the way for the implementation of one of Berlin's largest housing projects. Approximately 2,500 residential units are planned on about 39 hectares of the total 96-hectare former military training area "Parks Range." Of these, around 1,900 will be apartment buildings and about 600 will be terraced and semi-detached houses. Around 540 units are designated as social housing. The neighborhood will also include a primary school, several daycare centers, a youth recreation center, a sports field with a gymnasium, and local retail services. The economic scale of the project is significant: the investment volume amounts to several hundred million euros, although exact figures have not yet been publicly disclosed. Critics argue that the financing partly relies on external funds whose stability cannot be guaranteed. There is also ongoing debate about whether high-end condominiums can be successfully marketed in close proximity to socially disadvantaged areas. The Groth Group, as the project developer, is working with partners in the fields of energy, mobility, and education to create a sustainable and interconnected neighborhood. Construction is scheduled to begin in the coming months, starting with site clearance and infrastructure development. The building process will take place in several phases. The current status in Neulichterfelde shows that the project is now in the phase of site clearance and infrastructure development. Since October 2024, preparatory measures such as tree felling and construction site setup have been underway. These works are expected to last about 1.5 years and include the installation of water, electricity, and telecommunications lines as well as the construction of roads and pathways. However, there have been delays: an ant nest was discovered on Construction Site II in September 2025 and, due to species protection regulations, cannot be relocated in 2025. As a result, clearing of this section and the start of above-ground construction there will be postponed. Visually, the area is currently characterized by construction logistics, the dismantling of old structures, and initial earthworks. The rental apartments in the first construction phase are to be built near the Lichterfelde Süd station, followed by the town square with residential and commercial buildings. Above-ground construction is expected to begin in mid-2026.

== Criticism ==
Critics from politics, business, and civil society have voiced opposition to the project, with some questioning its fundamental viability. In addition to fundamental socio-political concerns—raised, for example, by the Left Party—economically oriented observers have particularly criticized the unsecured financing. The financial estimates cited for the project are considered significantly underestimated; the endeavor is said to be feasible only through external funds, whose stability is deemed uncertain given volatile markets. Furthermore, it is considered unlikely that enough private buyers would opt for high-end apartments located in close proximity to a social hotspot. As a result, the development is expected to primarily attract investment properties, which critics say could lead to further social segregation in the long term. Financial involvement by the State of Berlin is therefore seen as not only socially questionable but also economically risky
