= John Brown (British Army soldier) =

British espionage agent

- Born: John Henry Owen Brown c. October 1908; Wandsworth, London, England
- Died: 15 September 1965 (aged 56); Dorset, England
- Military career
- Allegiance: United Kingdom
- Branch: British Army
- Rank: Company quartermaster sergeant
- Nickname: Busty
- Service number: No. 1445560
- Unit: Royal Artillery
- Conflicts: Second World War

John Henry Owen Brown DCM (c. October 1908 – 15 September 1965) was a Quartermaster Sergeant in the Royal Artillery in the British Army, who served in France at the beginning of the Second World War. He was one of Britain's most successful espionage agents as a prisoner of war following his capture by German forces, and, following the war's conclusion, acted as a prosecution witness in trials for treason.

== Early life ==
John Henry Owen Brown was born the youngest of four siblings into a working class family in Tooting, South London. Following primary education at Small Wood Road School, John won a place to Battersea Grammar School. He did well here and subsequently passed the Cambridge University entrance exam.

Here he found a gulf between his working class background and those of the more privileged scholars but this did not hold him back and he succeeded.

In the late 1930s, Brown worked as an office manager at Truman's Brewery in East London where he was also active in the British Union of Fascists who knew him as 'Teddy' Brown.

== Military service ==
Prior to the outbreak of WWII John spent the weekends with the Territorial Army (United Kingdom) 57th (East Surrey) Anti-Tank Regiment (226th Battery). His fellow gunners christened him 'Busty' because of his 6'2" muscular stature and likeness to the American musician 'Busty' Brown.

His potential was soon recognised and he was promoted from gunner to battery quartermaster sergeant.

== Prisoner of war ==
He was captured at Dunkirk on 29 May 1940 and remained a prisoner of war until 1945. He volunteered to serve at the Blechhammer POW camp in Upper Silesia, and that he had been a member of the British Union of Fascists before the war helped him ingratiate himself with the Germans and strike up a relationship with the camp commandant.

In his posthumously published memoir, Brown claimed that before he left England he had been sent on a special course for spies operating in enemy hands but this was not true. In reality he was initiated as an MI9 POW coded letter-writer by Captain Julius Green, a Jewish-Glaswegian POW who was, for a period, the Blechhammer camp's dentist. Green gave Brown the codes and the means to pass intelligence back to London through MI9's Escape and Evasion Network. In summer 1942 a special camp was established to separate potential collaborators from other British POWs, Stalag III-D near Berlin. This in turn was divided into Special Detachment 999 (an officers' camp) and Special Detachment 517 (for other ranks). Both were presented by the Germans as "holiday camps" away from the poor rations, hard work and cold of normal camps, but the camp security was run by the Abwehr.

Brown was one of the prisoners sent to Freigegeben (Open Prison) Stalag III-D for an initial examination. A former member of the British Union of Fascists, he had developed a good relationship with the Germans, which he exploited to run a very efficient blackmarket operation among the conscripted foreign workers, using some of the profits to buy "luxury" items such as extra food, medicine for the camp hospital and even musical instruments for the camp band. Brown also had a hidden radio so was aware of the course of the war.

At Stalag III-D Brown quickly realised something was wrong, and after his visit he returned to Blechhammer. T

Brown decided to return to Stalag III-D as soon as possible; not only were the conditions better, he was suspicious of what were the Germans planning. After a carefully orchestrated row with the senior British NCOs at Blechhammer he persuaded the Commandant, Rittmeister Prinz Von Hohenlohe, to transfer him back to Stalag III-D. He arrived on 12 June 1943 where he was selected by Major Heimpel of the Gestapo to be senior British NCO of Special Detachment 517 based at Genshagen, in the Teltow-Fläming district of Berlin.

During this time, while being distrusted by the British POWs, he was reporting to MI9 by coded letters, giving guidance on targets for bomber attacks. More particularly he was engaged in subverting the German proposal to form a British Free Corps to fight for Germany. His cohorts included opera singer Margery Booth, a fellow British spy, who on one occasion whilst entertaining the camp inmates sang before Hitler just after Brown had hidden secret documents in her dress; Hitler subsequently sent her red roses wrapped in a Swastika flag. Brown was instrumental in identifying the British traitor John Amery, and both Brown and Booth had contact with William Joyce (Lord Haw-Haw), and were recruited by Joyce as a broadcaster on the German Concordia radio service; both later identified him post war, and were witnesses at his trial. By his own account, Brown had known Joyce in the 1930s through meeting him socially at the BUF headquarters in Chelsea.

At one point Brown was confronted by Major Heimpel with a statement from a traitor giving details of Brown's espionage activities, but Brown blamed it on some of the Jewish inmates, saying they were out to destroy the idea of a British Free Corps. The Germans believed him, but Heimpel still believed that he was a secret agent, and when the British Free Corps were disbanded Himmler ordered Brown's arrest.

As the Allied forces entered Germany, Brown and a friend managed to kill an SS Colonel, steal his car and make contact with US Army forces. However, once back with British forces he found himself facing a charge of aiding the enemy. Word of his secret work for the Allies soon came from London, and he was awarded the Distinguished Conduct Medal in recognition of his achievements. After the war he was the chief prosecution witness at 20 treason trials.

== Later life ==
He wrote of his wartime exploits in a book, In Durance Vile (Hale 1981), concluding "...I was only able to do what I did because of my Christian belief which sustained me in my durance vile through not only the danger, but the hopeless dreariness of prisoner-of-war life". Brown's story is recounted from the perspective of Reg Beattie, one of the members of his team, in the book about Reg's POW diary entitled "Captive Plans".

After working as a businessman in Newcastle, he moved to Dorset, where he died in September 1965 at the age of 56. He was survived by his wife, Nancy.

== General references ==
- Weale, Adrian (2001). Patriot Traitors: Roger Casement, John Amery and the Real Meaning of Treason. Viking. pp. 174–175. ISBN 0-670-88498-7.
- Brown, John; John Borrie (1981). In Durance Vile. Hale. ISBN 0-7091-8980-X.
- Beattie, Reg; Trevor Beattie (2011). Captive Plans. Brighton: L M N O P Books. ISBN 978-0-9569563-0-9. Archived from the original on 2 April 2012.
- Sean Murphy. Letting the Side Down: British Traitors of the Second World War, PP122–3. London: The History Press Ltd, 2005. ISBN 0-7509-4176-6
- Weale, Adrian (2002). Renegades: Hitler's Englishmen. Pimlico (Rev. ed.). London: Pimlico. ISBN 978-0-7126-6764-7.
