= Waterside Inn =

Waterside Inn may refer to:

- Waterside Inn, Leigh, a public house in Greater Manchester, England
- The Waterside Inn, a restaurant in Berkshire, England
