= Waterside Inn, Leigh =

Listed pub in Greater Manchester, England

Waterside Inn
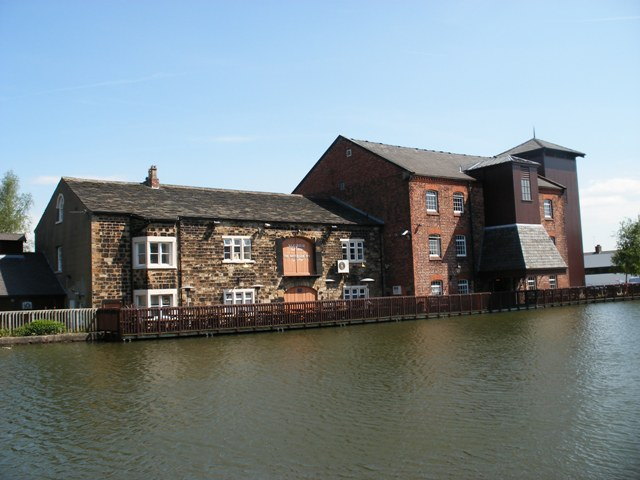
- The pub in 2008

- Location within Greater Manchester

General information
- Type: Public house; originally a canal warehouse
- Location: Canal Street, Leigh, Greater Manchester, England
- Coordinates: 53.4943°N 2.5216°W
- Year built: Late 18th century
- Opening: 2024 (as a pub)
- Renovated: Late 19th century (added)
- Closed: 2020 (as a pub)
- Owner: Greene King

Design and construction
- Designations

Listed Building – Grade II
- Official name: Former canal warehouse
- Designated: 27 July 1987
- Reference no.: 1068479

Website
- thewatersideleigh.co.uk

The Waterside Inn (officially listed as Former canal warehouse) is a Grade II listed public house on Canal Street in Leigh, a town within the Metropolitan Borough of Wigan, Greater Manchester, England. The building was originally constructed in the late 18th century as a canal warehouse, with a brick extension added in the late 19th century, and was still used for warehousing when it was listed in 1987. It became part of the Leigh Bridge conservation area in 1989 and was subsequently converted for use as a pub.

== History ==
The building was constructed in the late 18th century, according to its official listing, and was originally a canal warehouse, with a brick extension added in the late 19th century. The 1893 and 1939 Ordnance Survey maps show the building without a designation or attributed name.

On 27 July 1987, the former canal warehouse was designated a Grade II listed building, at which time it was described as being in use for warehousing. In December 1989, the site was included within the newly designated Leigh Bridge conservation area. The building was converted to a public house at a later date.

In October 2020, the pub closed after its operators announced that reopening would not be viable during the COVID-19 pandemic and cited other contributing factors, though it subsequently reopened in April 2024. As of May 2026, the pub's freehold was owned by Greene King.

== Architecture ==
The earlier warehouse is an 18th‑century, two‑storey structure built in stone, with four bays. It includes loading doors in the third bay at the front and rear, stone‑framed windows in the central bays, and a two‑storey canted window in the first bay. A chimney rises along the roof line.

The later warehouse, added in the 19th century, is a larger brick‑built block with three storeys and five bays. Each floor has four casement windows with arched brick heads, and the central bay contains loading doors set within blue‑brick surrounds and topped by a small gable. The eaves have decorative brickwork, the gable ends are finished with coping stones, and the rear elevation includes a projecting canopy above the loading doors.

== See also ==
- Listed buildings in Leigh, Greater Manchester
- Listed pubs in Greater Manchester
