= Margery Booth =

Opera singer and spy

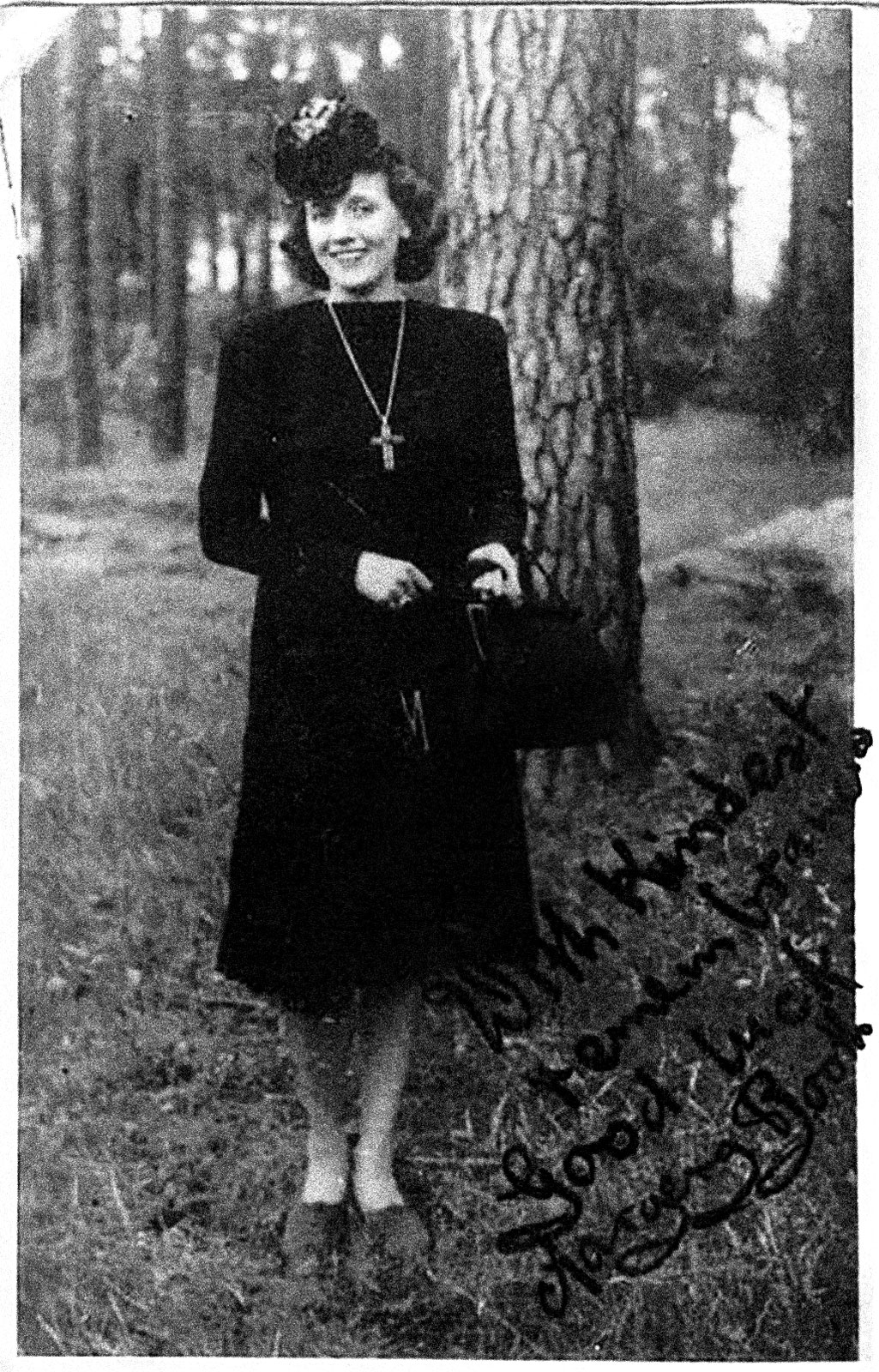
- Margery Booth in an undated autographed photo
- Born: Margery Myers Booth; 25 January 1906; Wigan, Lancashire, England
- Died: 11 April 1952 (aged 46); New York, U.S.
- Other name: Margery Kallus

Margery Myers Strohm (née Booth; 25 January 1906 – 11 April 1952), also known as Margery Kallus, was a British opera singer, who having married a German and emigrated to Germany, became a British spy during World War II, meeting Adolf Hitler and singing at a British prisoner of war camp.

== Life ==
Margery Myers Booth was born on 25 January 1906 at 53 Hodges Street, Wigan, Lancashire, the daughter of Levi Booth’s first marriage to Florence (née Tetley) Booth. His second wife, Ada (née Sidebotham), was also a local opera singer. After her parents' divorce in 1920 the family later moved to Southport. Booth trained in Bolton with R. Evans, in Knightsbridge with Eileen D'Orme, and then the Guildhall School of Music, where she won a scholarship in 1925, then the Opera Scholarship and Liza Lehmann Prize. She made her professional debut at the Queen's Hall, Wigan, on 4 October 1935. She then moved back to London to continue her career in Covent Garden London in 1936, but her marriage to Dr Egon Strohm, from a brewing family in the Black Forest, took her to Germany.

Her career blossomed with performances at Bayreuth and with the Berlin State Opera, but she also made irregular appearances at Covent Garden. She starred as Madalene in 1936, as Flosshilde in Götterdämmerung, as the Shepherd boy in a recording of Tosca with Hildegard Ranczak, but was most famous for her portrayal as Carmen.

At the outbreak of World War II the Nazis mistakenly trusted her, sending her to Freigegeben (Open Prison) Stalag III-D, a camp for potential recruits to the British Free Corps. There she worked with British agent and prisoner John Brown to obtain details of traitors. On one occasion she sang before Hitler just after a British officer had hidden secret documents in her dress; Hitler subsequently sent her red roses wrapped in a Swastika flag.

In early 1944, she was arrested by the Gestapo as a suspected spy, and although tortured, did not reveal any information. On release she made her way west, and was liberated in Germany by the advancing US Army. After the war, information she provided was used to convict both Lord Haw Haw and John Amery, both of whom were hanged for treason. She then returned to London, but was rejected as she was wrongly thought to have been a Nazi sympathizer.

== Death ==
Emigrating again to New York, she was reportedly diagnosed with terminal breast cancer, which claimed her life in New York on 11 April 1952, aged 46.

== Legacy ==
In 2014, a feature movie was made about her entitled Margery Booth: The Spy in the Eagle's Nest and starring Anna Friel as Booth, Stephen Fry as Hermann Göring, Susan George as Booth's mother Ada, and Patrick Bergin as Standartenführer Kümmel.
