= George and Dragon, Leigh =

Listed pub in Greater Manchester, England

George and Dragon
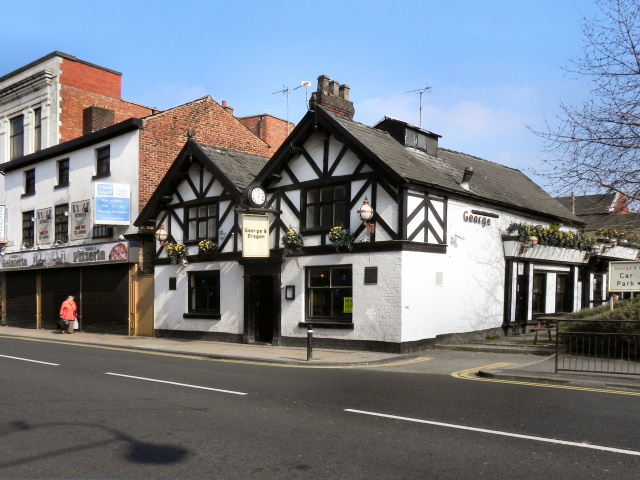
- The pub in 2011

- Location within Greater Manchester

General information
- Type: Public house
- Location: 7 King Street, Leigh, Greater Manchester, England
- Coordinates: 53.4961°N 2.5190°W
- Year built: Mid-17th century
- Renovated: 19th and 20th century (altered); 2012 (refurbished)
- Owner: Amber Taverns

Design and construction
- Designations

Listed Building – Grade II
- Official name: The George and Dragon
- Designated: 18 October 1991
- Reference no.: 1261842

Website
- Official website

The George and Dragon is a Grade II listed public house on King Street in Leigh, a town within the Metropolitan Borough of Wigan, Greater Manchester, England. Built in the mid-17th century, it was later altered in the 19th and 20th centuries, although the nature of those works was not recorded. The pub underwent a major refurbishment in March 2012, and its freehold was owned by Amber Taverns as of April 2026.

== History ==
The building was constructed in the mid-17th century, according to its official listing, and later saw changes in the 19th and 20th centuries, although the nature of those works was not recorded. Some of the ceiling beams now visible in the bar area are modern, which may reflect part of those alterations. The 1893 and 1939 Ordnance Survey maps mark the building with no designation or attributed name, while the 1907 edition records it as an inn.

On 18 October 1991, the George and Dragon was designated a Grade II listed building. In March 2012, the pub underwent a major refurbishment that lasted around eight weeks. As of April 2026, the pub's freehold was owned by Amber Taverns.

== Architecture ==
The building is painted brick with a slate roof and two storeys. Its front has two gables and two first‑floor windows, and the structure extends back with a short wing on the left side. The main entrance sits slightly right of centre in a framed wooden surround, with wide four‑pane windows on either side. The upper front wall has decorative boarding, and the windows here are three‑part casements with a horizontal bar. The gables have shaped bargeboards with small finials. A brick chimney rises from the middle of the roof, and a small lantern stands on the right‑hand ridge.

At the rear, the left gable retains part of an old brick moulding. On the left side, the gabled wing is lit by an early three‑light window beneath a brick moulding, with traces of another moulding at ground level to the right. Both side walls show an uneven joint near the King Street elevation, suggesting the front was rebuilt at some point.

Inside, some of the ceiling beams visible in the bar area appear to be modern. Other parts of the interior are thought to contain a substantial amount of 17th‑century material that is now hidden from view.

== See also ==
- Listed buildings in Leigh, Greater Manchester
- Listed pubs in Greater Manchester
