= Atherton Urban District =

Former local government district in Lancashire, England

Coordinates: 53°31′N 2°30′W

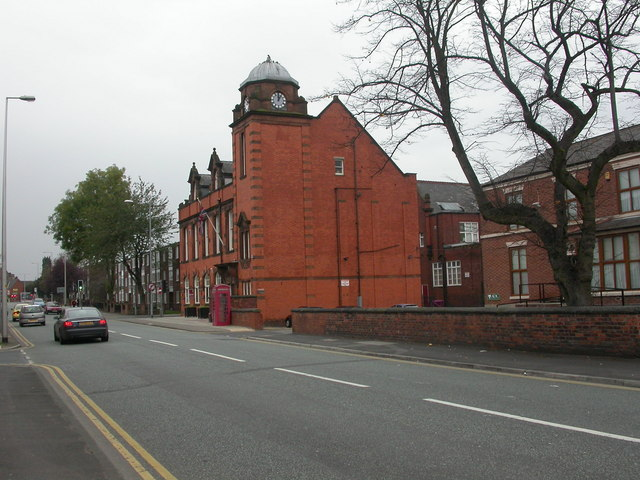
- Atherton Town Hall
- History
  - Created: 1894
  - Abolished: 1974
  - Succeeded by: Metropolitan Borough of Wigan
- Status: Urban district
  - HQ: Atherton Town Hall

Atherton was, from 1863 to 1974, a local government district in Lancashire, England.

== History ==
The township of Atherton historically lay in the large ecclesiastical parish of Leigh and Leigh Poor Law Union formed in 1837.

In 1863 Atherton Local Government District was created when the township adopted the Local Government Act 1858. A local board was formed to govern the town. The Local Government Act 1894 added part of the township to Leigh Urban District and reconstituted the rest of the township as an urban district, with Atherton Urban District Council replacing the local board. The urban district council consisted of fifteen members, elected from five wards—Central, North, East, South, and West. In 1974 Atherton Urban District was abolished by the Local Government Act 1972 and its former area transferred to Greater Manchester to form part of the Metropolitan Borough of Wigan.
