= Mounts Baths =

Swimming baths in Northampton, UK

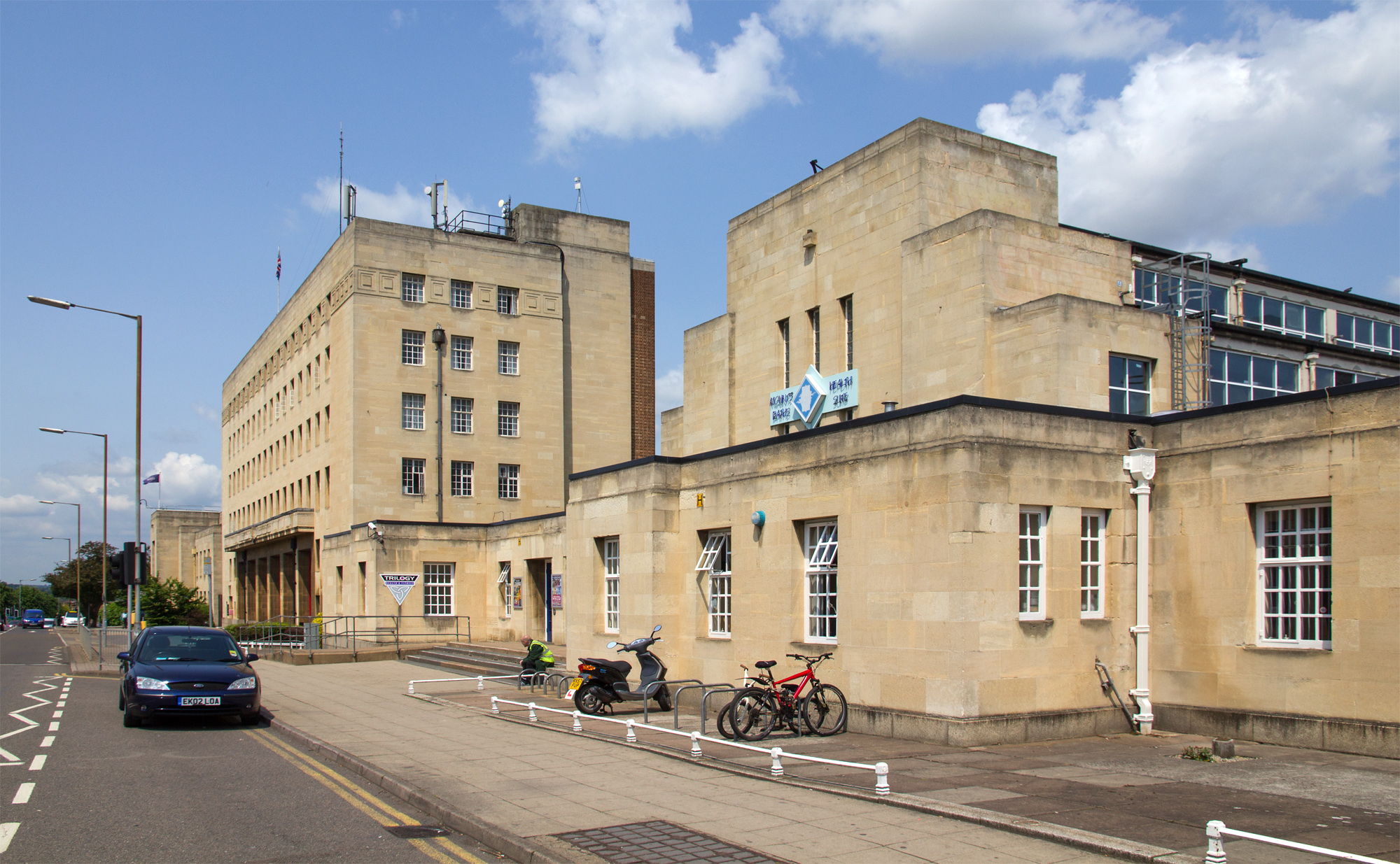
- Civic centre on Upper Mounts. Mounts Baths is on the right; the fire station is on its left.
- Interactive map of the Mounts Baths area

General information
- Architectural style: Art Deco
- Location: Northampton grid reference SP 757 610, Mounts Baths, Upper Mounts; Northampton NN1 3DN, United Kingdom
- Coordinates: 52°14′30″N 0°53′36″W
- Opened: 1936

Design and construction
- Architecture firm: J. C. Prestwich & Sons
- Civil engineer: Sir Alexander Gibb & Partners
- Other designers

Listed Building – Grade II
- Official name: Mounts Baths
- Designated: 28 January 2013
- Reference no.: 1410055

Website
- https://www.trilogyleisure.co.uk/centres/mounts-baths-leisure-centre/

Mounts Baths is a public swimming baths in Northampton, England, built 1935—1936. It is notable for its Art Deco style.

It is a Grade II listed building, listed on 28 January 2013. It is regarded by Historic England as "a particularly good example of a Modern Movement swimming pool", noting "especially the Art Deco hot rooms" of its Victorian-style Turkish bath, one of the last such baths still open in the British Isles.

== History ==
Mounts Baths was built as part of a civic centre located on the site of a recently demolished prison. The civic centre also included a fire station with accommodation, and a police station and courts.

The committee overseeing the construction was chaired by Councillor W. J. Bassett-Lowke. He was interested in Modernism; the interior of his home, 78 Derngate, was remodelled in Art Deco style. A competition to design the baths was won by J. C. Prestwich & Sons of Leigh, Lancashire. It was built by A. Glenn & Son of Northampton; Sir Alexander Gibb & Partners were the engineers. Construction began in 1935, and the building was opened in October 1936.

=== Architecture ===
The front of the building is faced with ashlared Bath stone. There are large tiered windows, in reinforced concrete frames, on the sides of the pool hall, and these are supported by eight parabolic arches of reinforced concrete. Historic England comments that the interior "resembles a cathedral nave flooded with light from the tiered clerestory".

The dado around the pool hall is clad in stone-coloured faience, and the pool is clad in blue faience tiles. Doorways on the sides of the hall are framed with Vitrolite panels. Ivory and black ceramic tiles are used in other parts of the building.

There was provision for an open-air pool, which was never built. In the 1970s a single-storey extension was added for a teaching pool.
