= Boar's Head, Leigh =

Listed pub in Greater Manchester, England

Boar's Head
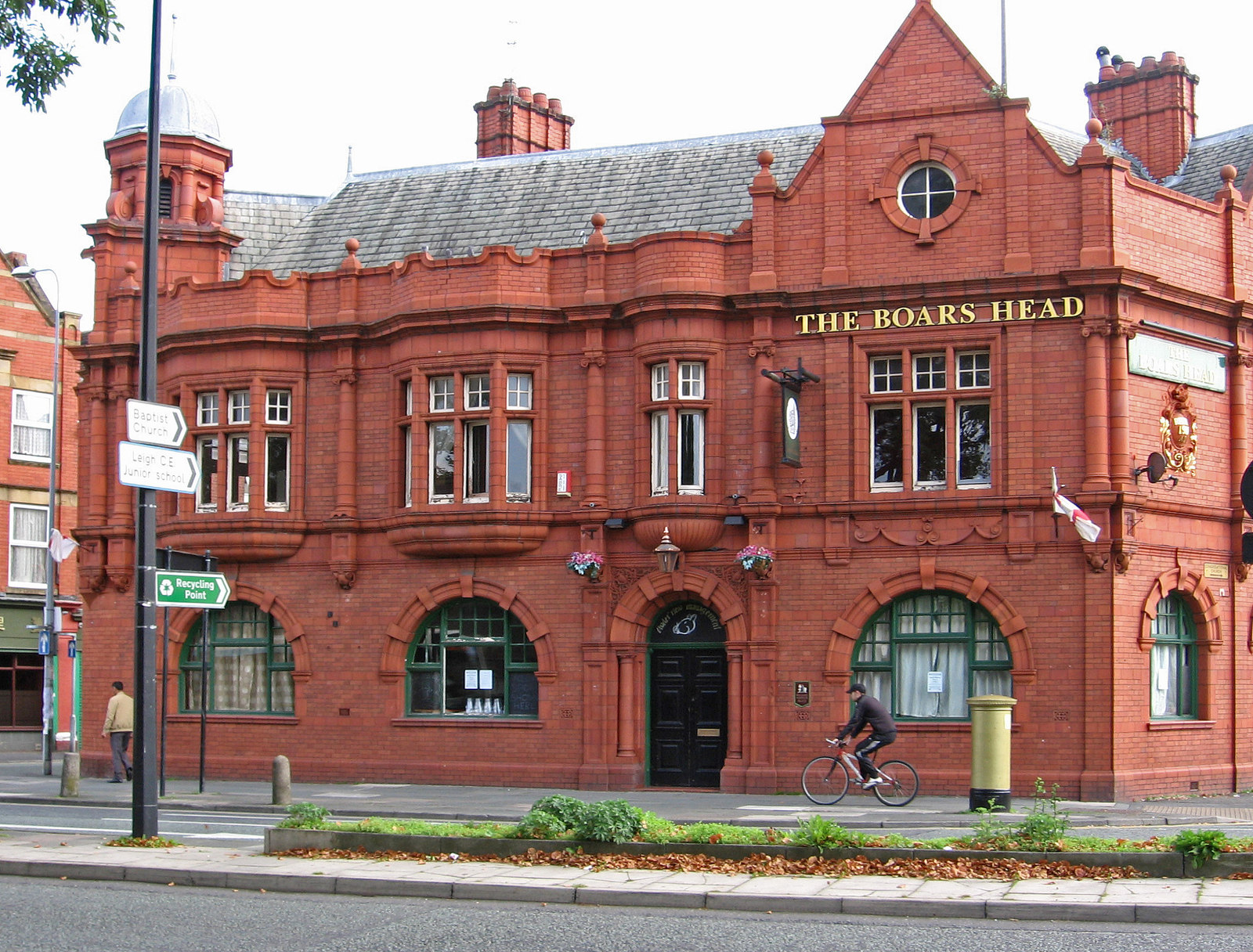
- The pub in 2014

- Location within Greater Manchester
- Alternative names: Boars Head

General information
- Type: Public house
- Architectural style: Eclectic Baroque
- Location: 2 Market Place, Leigh, Greater Manchester, England
- Coordinates: 53.4982°N 2.5186°W
- Year built: 1900; 126 years ago
- Client: Leigh Brewery
- Owner: Benant Developments Ltd.

Design and construction
- Architect: Christopher Simpson
- Designations

Listed Building – Grade II
- Official name: Boar's Head public house
- Designated: 9 July 1975
- Reference no.: 1163139

Listed Building – Grade II
- Official name: Stables at the Boar's Head public house
- Designated: 15 January 1996
- Reference no.: 1246069

The Boar's Head is a Grade II listed public house on Market Place in Leigh, a town within the Metropolitan Borough of Wigan, Greater Manchester, England. Built in 1900 to designs by local architect Christopher Simpson for the Leigh Brewery, it replaced an earlier pub on the same site and incorporates a former stable block that is also listed at Grade II. The building retains notable historic features, and its interior is recognised by the Campaign for Real Ale (CAMRA) with a one‑star rating for its "special national historic importance".

== History ==
According to a 1904 report in Building News, the Boar's Head Hotel was rebuilt in 1900 on a site fronting Market Place, the new structure being designed by the local architect Christopher Simpson for the Leigh Brewery. Around this time the earlier buildings on the site, including the previous Boar's Head public house, a furniture store and a porcelain goods shop, were demolished, and the present building was erected, incorporating stables and bearing a decorative cartouche inscribed "Rebuilt 1900 AD". The original Market Place pub, known to residents as the "Pig's Face", was built in the 18th century and was also used for the court leet of the Lords Lilford, the Powys family who held the manor of Leigh. The 1907 Ordnance Survey map marks the building as a hotel with no attributed name, while the 1928 and 1939 editions show it as a public house.

In the 1970s, Walkers Brewery sought to dispose of the pub, but residents and the Leigh People's Paper alerted councillors to the plan, and it remained open. On 9 July 1975, the Boar's Head was designated a Grade II listed building. The interior is recognised by the Campaign for Real Ale (CAMRA) with a one‑star rating, indicating its status as of "special national historic importance".

In 2012 a post box next to the Boar's Head was painted gold in honour of local Paralympic champion Heather Frederiksen, who won gold in the 100 m backstroke at the London Games. As of April 2026, the pub's freehold is owned by Benant Developments Ltd. The Boar's Head stands opposite the Grade II*-listed parish church of St Mary's.

== Architecture ==
=== Exterior ===
The building is constructed of red brick with terracotta detailing and has a green slate roof. It has two storeys and a front arranged in several bays. The design mixes Baroque influences, with features such as a raised base, horizontal bands between the floors, and a parapet along the roofline.

The ground floor has large arched windows with decorative stonework, while the main entrance sits in the third bay and is framed by columns, a fanlight and patterned panels. On the first floor, the windows project outward in angled and curved forms with terracotta framing. The left-hand corner is marked by a small octagonal dome supported by columns and scrolls, balanced on the right by a gable with ball finials and a round window. The side elevations follow the same treatment. On the Church Street side, the central gable carries a carving of a boar's head. Tall grouped chimneys rise above the roof. The building originally accommodated the brewery's head offices.

=== Interior ===
The interior has been altered over time, and some changes have affected its historic character, but a number of early features remain. The main entrance opens into a wide tiled corridor, with the rooms on the right being the best preserved; these include fixed seating with bell‑pushes and original timber and cast‑iron fireplaces. To the left is a bar‑hall area, where a green tiled dado continues up the staircase and along the passage towards the rear. The present bar counter dates from 2015, although part of the original bar‑back survives.

== Associated stables ==
The former stable block, built around 1900 to serve the pub, is also Grade II listed. It is an L‑shaped red‑brick building with two storeys, later adapted for other uses. The long range faces the street, with a shorter wing set at right angles. A ramp in the courtyard gives access to the upper floor, and several of the original openings survive, though some have been altered or blocked. The rear wing has a wide ground‑floor entrance and a first‑floor loading doorway.

== See also ==
- Listed buildings in Leigh, Greater Manchester
- Listed pubs in Greater Manchester
