= Atherton Town Hall =

Municipal building in Atherton, Greater Manchester, England

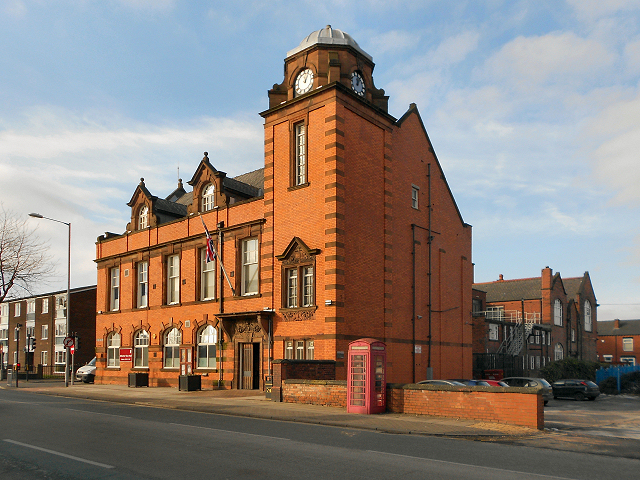
- Atherton Town Hall

- Shown in Greater Manchester
- 53.5258°N 2.4872°W
- Location: Bolton Road, Atherton

History
- Built: 1900

Site notes
- Architect: James Caldwell Prestwich
- Architectural style: Baroque style

Atherton Town Hall is a municipal building in Bolton Road, Atherton, Greater Manchester, England. The town hall, which was the headquarters of Atherton Urban District Council, is now in use as a community hub and as a public library.

== History ==
After significant industrial growth in the mid-19th century, largely associated with the coal mining industry, in 1863, a local board of health was formed which established its offices in Bolton Road. Atherton became an urban district in 1894 and, in this context, civic leaders decided to demolish the existing offices and build a new structure on the same site.

Construction started on the new building in 1898. It was designed by James Caldwell Prestwich in the Baroque style, built in red brick with stone dressings and was completed in 1900. The design involved an asymmetrical main frontage with six bays facing onto Bolton Road; the left-hand section of five bays featured round headed windows in the first four bays and a doorway with a richly carved rectangular tympanum flanked by brackets supporting a stone canopy in the fifth bay. There were casement windows on the first floor. The right-hand bay contained a clock tower with an octagonal cupola, containing an hour-striking clock by Potts of Leeds. A Carnegie library, designed by Bradshaw Gass & Hope, was built on a site just to the north of the town hall and was opened by Lord Lilford on 24 May 1905.

The building remained the headquarters of Atherton Urban District Council for much of the 20th century but ceased to be the local seat of government after the enlarged Wigan Metropolitan Borough Council was formed in 1974. An extensive programme of refurbishment works costing £1 million was completed in November 2018. The works included the creation of a community hub where residents could meet with council officers, as well as the conversion of part of the municipal space for library use so that the Carnegie Library could be sold by Wigan Council.
