= 2015 in architecture =

The year 2015 in architecture involved some significant architectural events and new buildings.

== Events ==
- July – The Japanese government announces it is abandoning the original plans for a new National Olympic Stadium (Tokyo) for the 2020 Summer Olympics based on a design by Zaha Hadid.
- November 4–6 – The eighth annual World Architecture Festival is held in Singapore.

=== World heritage ===
- 5 July – The Speicherstadt and Kontorhausviertel in Hamburg (including Chilehaus, an exceptional example of Brick Expressionism), are listed as a World Heritage Site.

== Buildings and structures ==
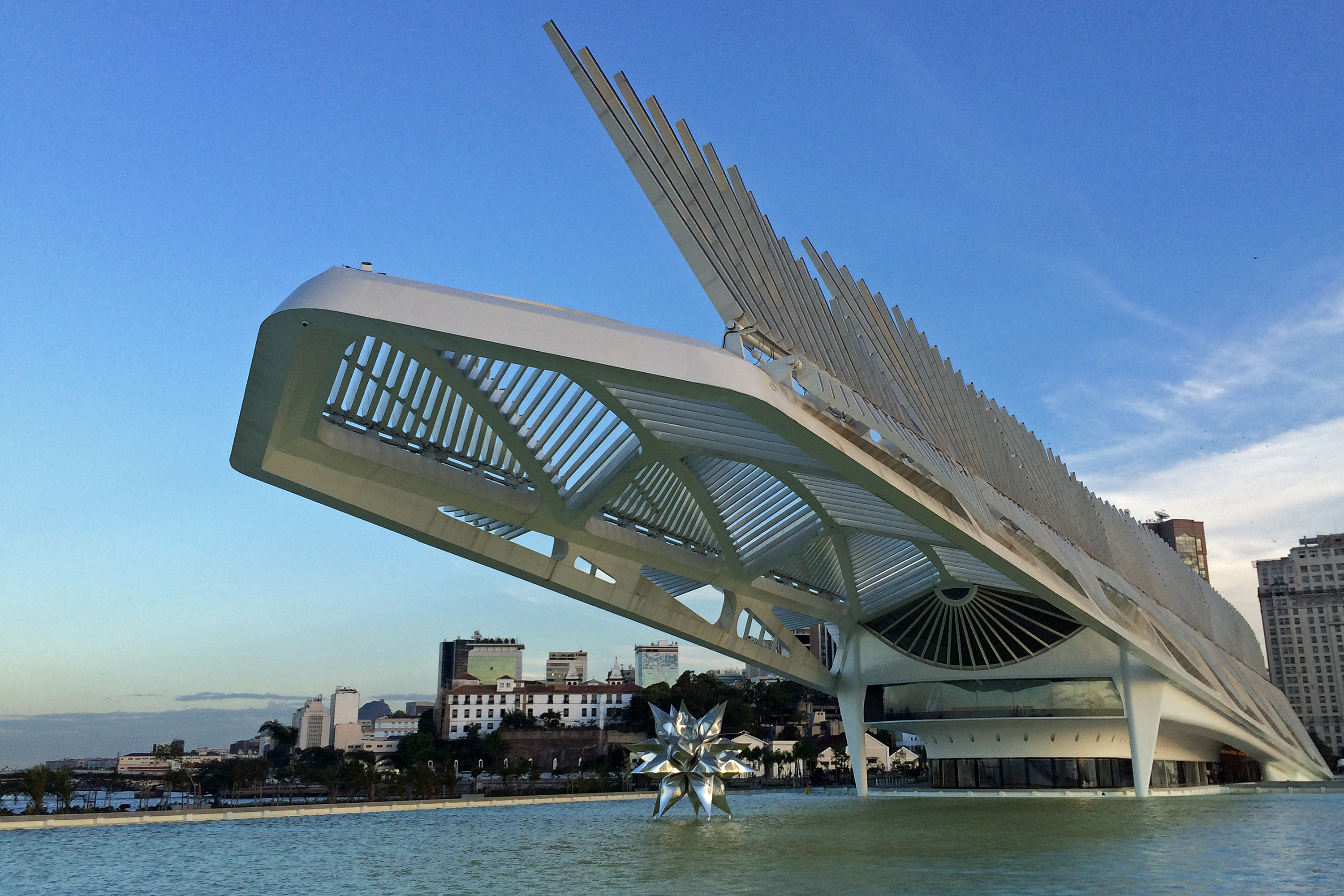
The Museum of Tomorrow in Rio de Janeiro, Brazil

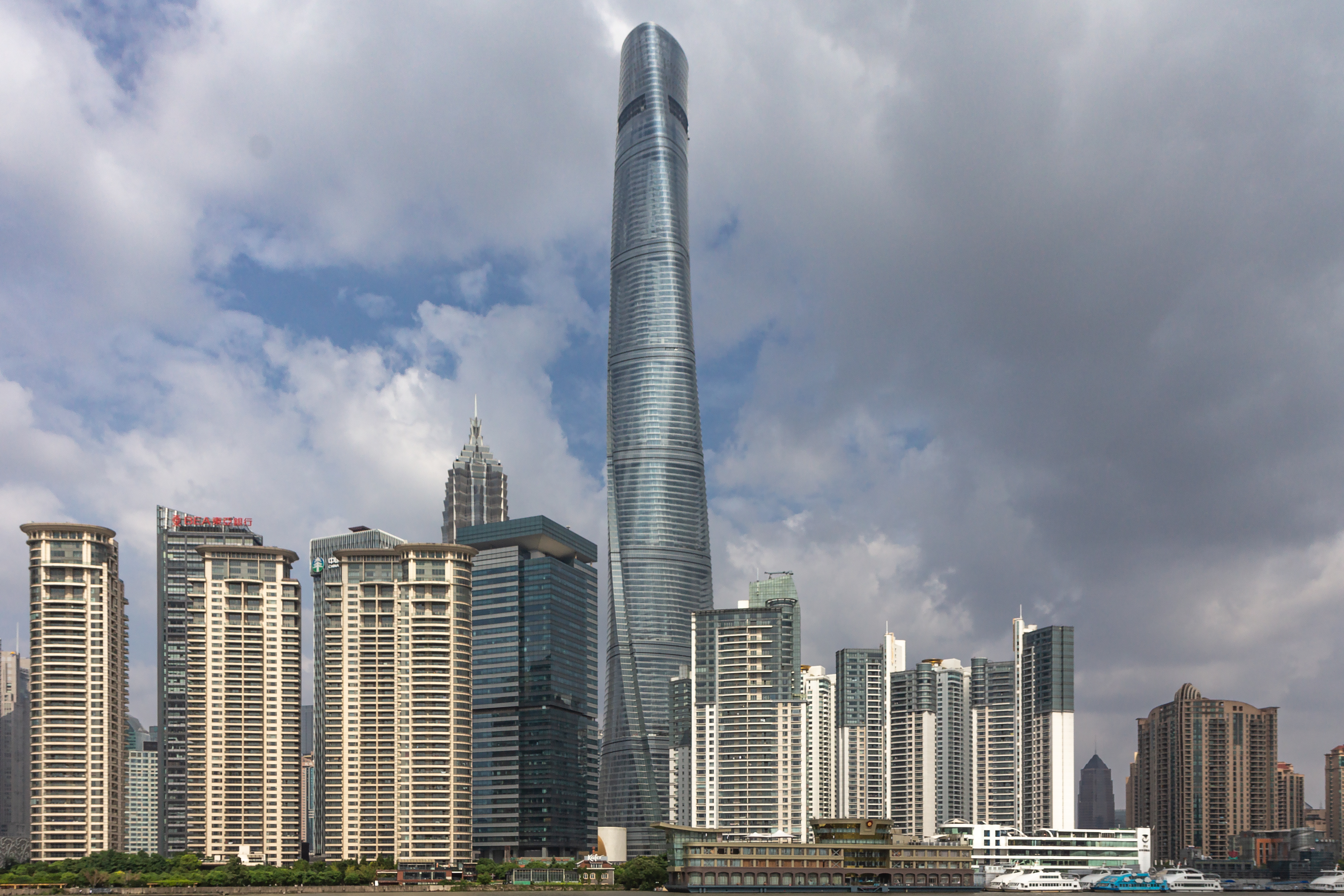
Shanghai Tower, China

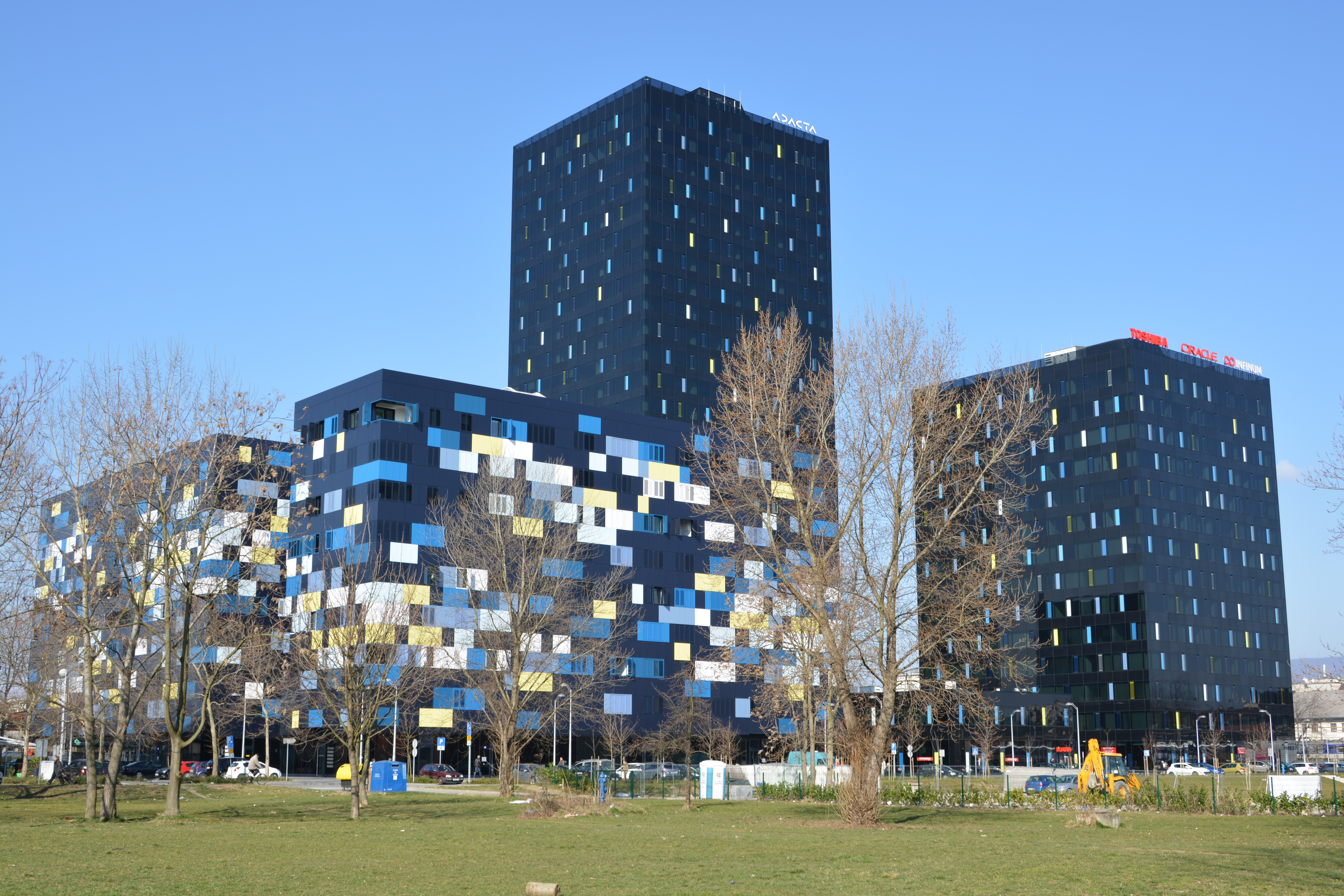
Strojarska Business Center in Zagreb, Croatia

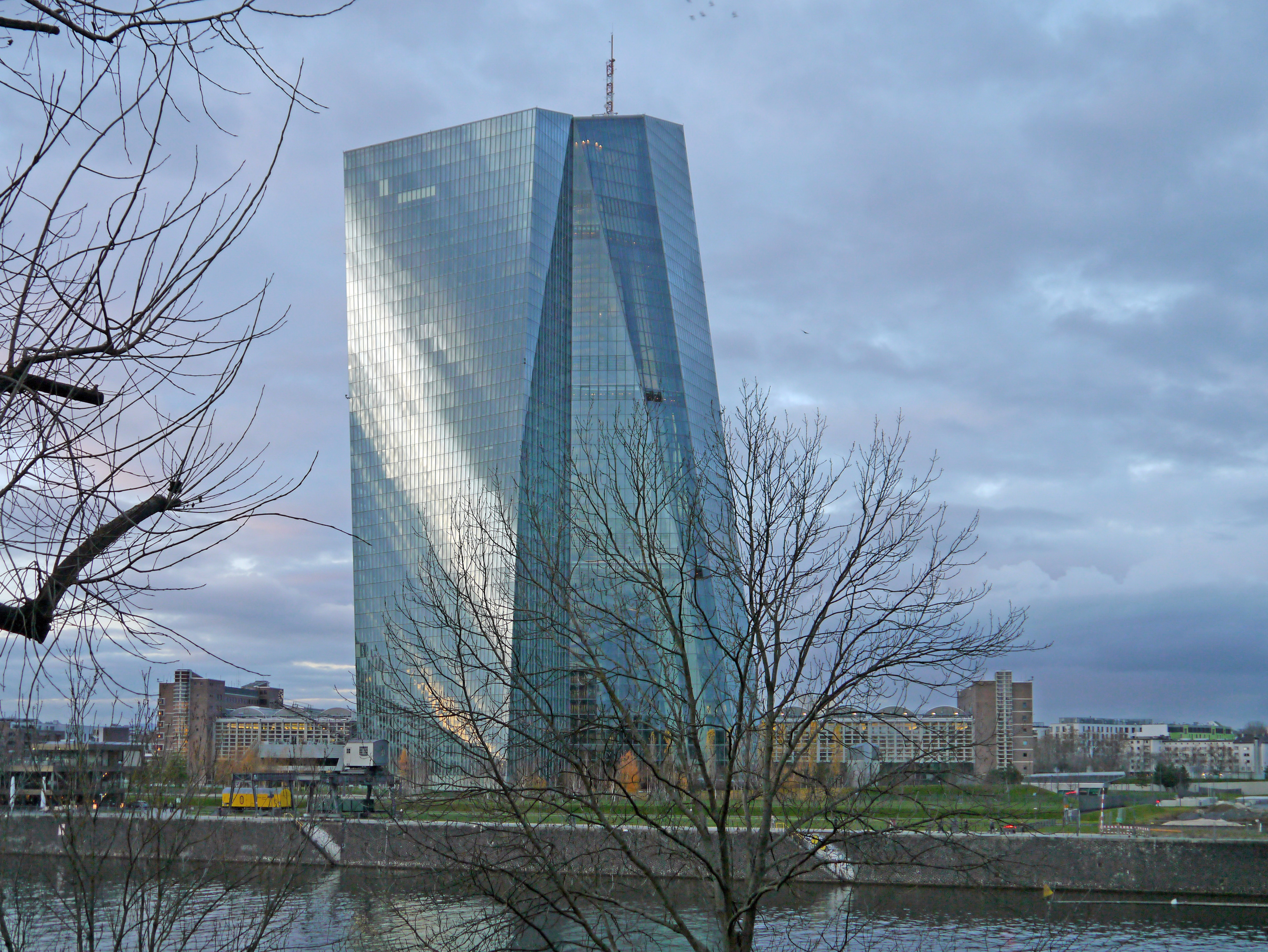
The European Central Bank HQ in Frankfurt, Germany

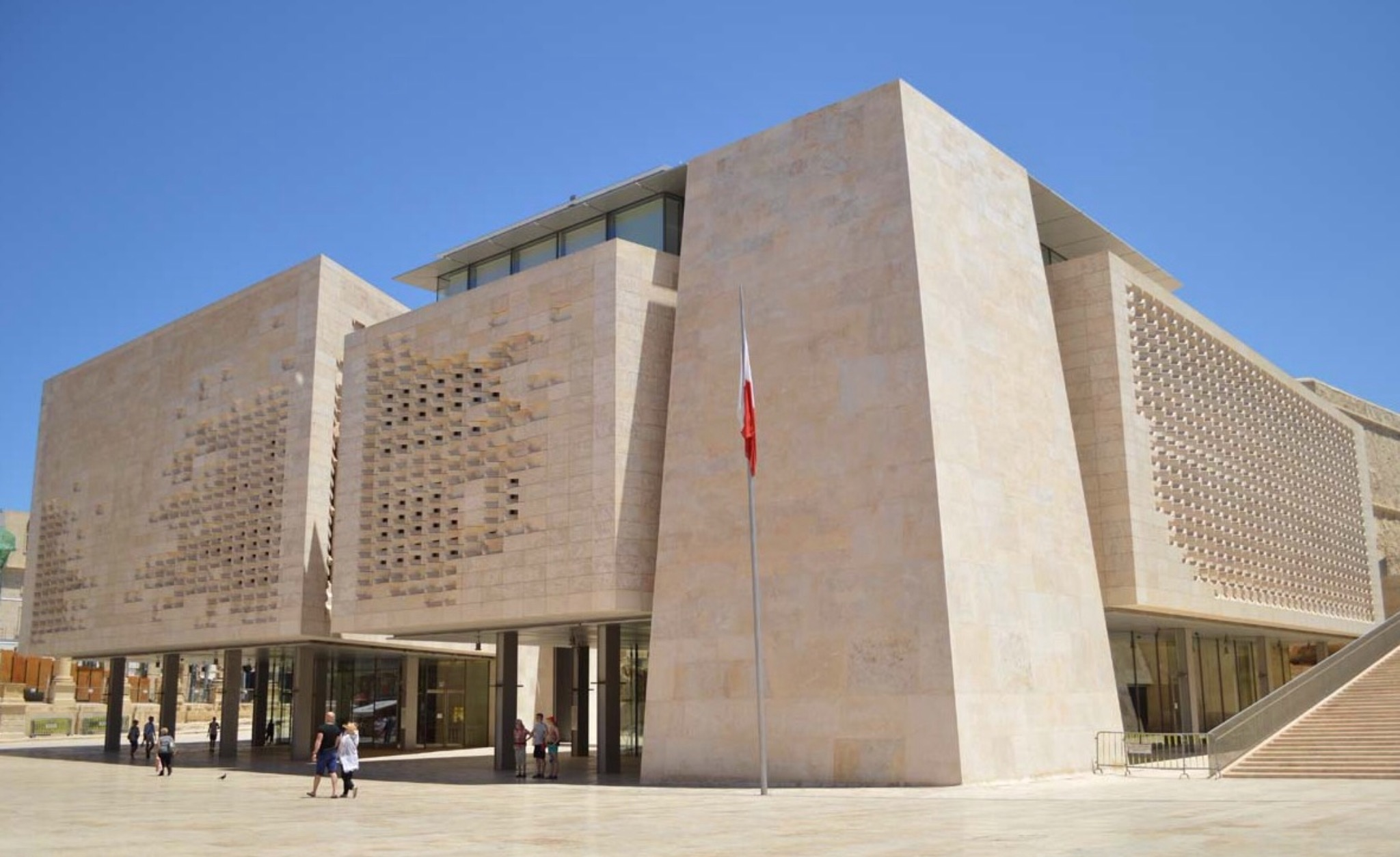
Parliament House in Valletta, Malta

=== Buildings completed/opened ===
Antarctica

- March – Comandante Ferraz Antarctic Station, designed by Estúdio 41, scheduled to commence operation.

Australia

- January 21 – Brooke Street Pier, Hobart, Tasmania.
- MPavilion (pop-up structure), Melbourne, designed by Amanda Levete's AL A.

Brazil

- December 17 – Museum of Tomorrow in Rio de Janeiro, designed by Santiago Calatrava, is opened.

China

- September 6 – Shanghai Tower in Shanghai, the tallest building in China and the second-tallest in the world (2015–present), is completed.
- Shimao Cross-Strait Plaza in Xiamen, designed by Gensler, is topped out.

Croatia

- Strojarska Business Center in Zagreb is completed. The main building, Building B, which has 25 floors and is 315 feet tall is the tallest residential building in Croatia.

France

- January 14 – Philharmonie de Paris, designed by Jean Nouvel, opened.

Germany

- March 18 – European Central Bank HQ in Frankfurt.
- May 9 – Propsteikirche, Leipzig, designed by Schulz und Schulz, consecrated.
- October 23 – German Football Museum in Dortmund opened.

Indonesia

- Gama Tower in Jakarta, the tallest building in Indonesia (2015–present), is topped off.

Italy

- Australian Pavilion for Venice Biennale of Architecture 2016, designed by Denton Corker Marshall, built.

Malta

- May 4 – Parliament House, Valletta, designed by Renzo Piano.

Netherlands

- Nov 19 - Arnhem Centraal Railway Station, Arnhem, designed by UNStudio. Construction started in 2006.

Peru

- UTEC (Universidad de Ingeniería y Tecnología), Lima, designed by Grafton Architects with Shell Arquitectos.

Poland

- National Forum of Music in Wrocław.

Russia

- Federation Tower, in Moscow, the tallest building in Europe, projected for completion.

Singapore

- March 10 – Learning Hub at Nanyang Technological University, designed by Thomas Heatherwick, opened.
- November 24 – National Gallery Singapore, designed by Studio Milou Architecture, projected for opening.

United Kingdom

- January – Darbishire Place social housing for the Peabody Trust in London, designed by Niall McLaughlin Architects.
- February 14 – Extension to Whitworth Art Gallery in Manchester, England, designed by McInnes Usher McKnight Architects (MUMA).
- May 21 – HOME, an arts venue in Manchester, designed by Mecanoo.
- May 26 – Investcorp Building at Middle East Centre, St Antony's College, Oxford, designed by Zaha Hadid.
- June – Trafalgar Place housing development in south London by dRMM Architects completed.
- August – City of Glasgow College, Riverside Campus, designed by Michael Laird Architects and Reiach and Hall Architects, opens to students.
- September 30 – Christchurch Bridge, Reading, England, designed by Design Engine Architects, completed.
- October 8 – Newport Street Gallery in south London, a conversion of 1913 theatrical workshops into a free public art gallery by Caruso St John architects.
- October – New building for the University of Oxford's Ruskin School of Art in Bullingdon Road by Spratley Studios.
- November 30 – Blavatnik School of Government in the University of Oxford, England, designed by Herzog & de Meuron, begins to function.
- Clergy Court (new cloister) at Blackburn Cathedral in the north of England, designed by Purcell, projected for completion.

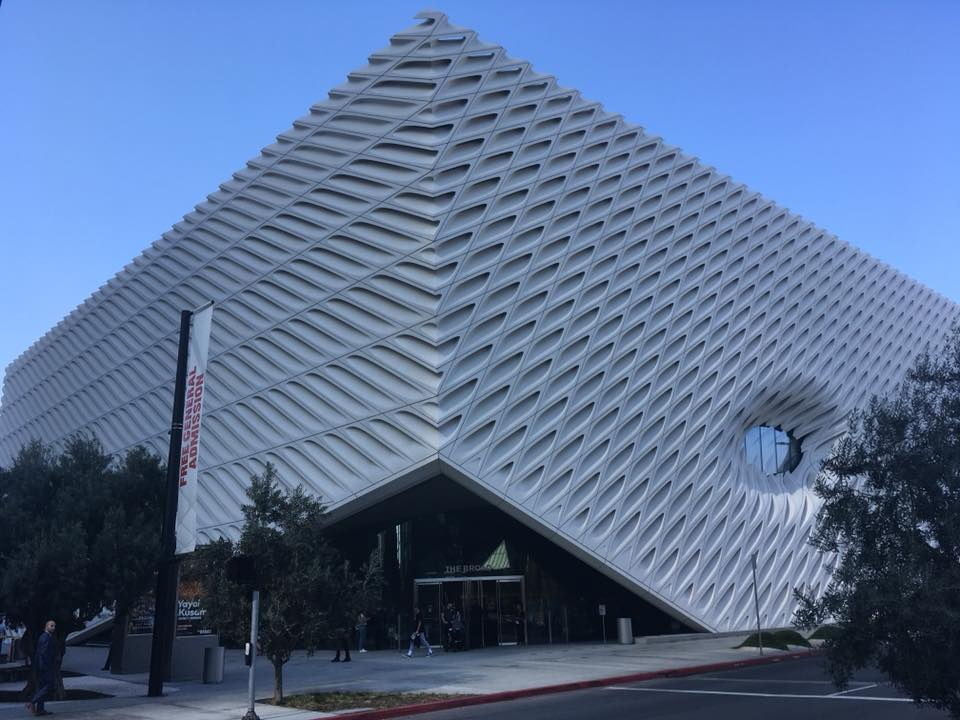
The Broad museum in Downtown Los Angeles, USA

- Outhouse, a house in the Forest of Dean, by Loyn & Co architects.
- A House for Essex, Wrabness, designed by Charles Holland of FAT with Grayson Perry.

United States

- May 1 – New Whitney Museum of American Art in the Meatpacking District, Manhattan, designed by Renzo Piano.
- September 20 – The Broad (contemporary art museum) in Downtown Los Angeles, designed by Diller Scofidio + Renfro.
- December 23 – 432 Park Avenue, the tallest residential building in the world (2015–2020) is completed.

Zimbabwe

- January – Tokwe Mukorsi Dam, Masvingo.

== Awards ==
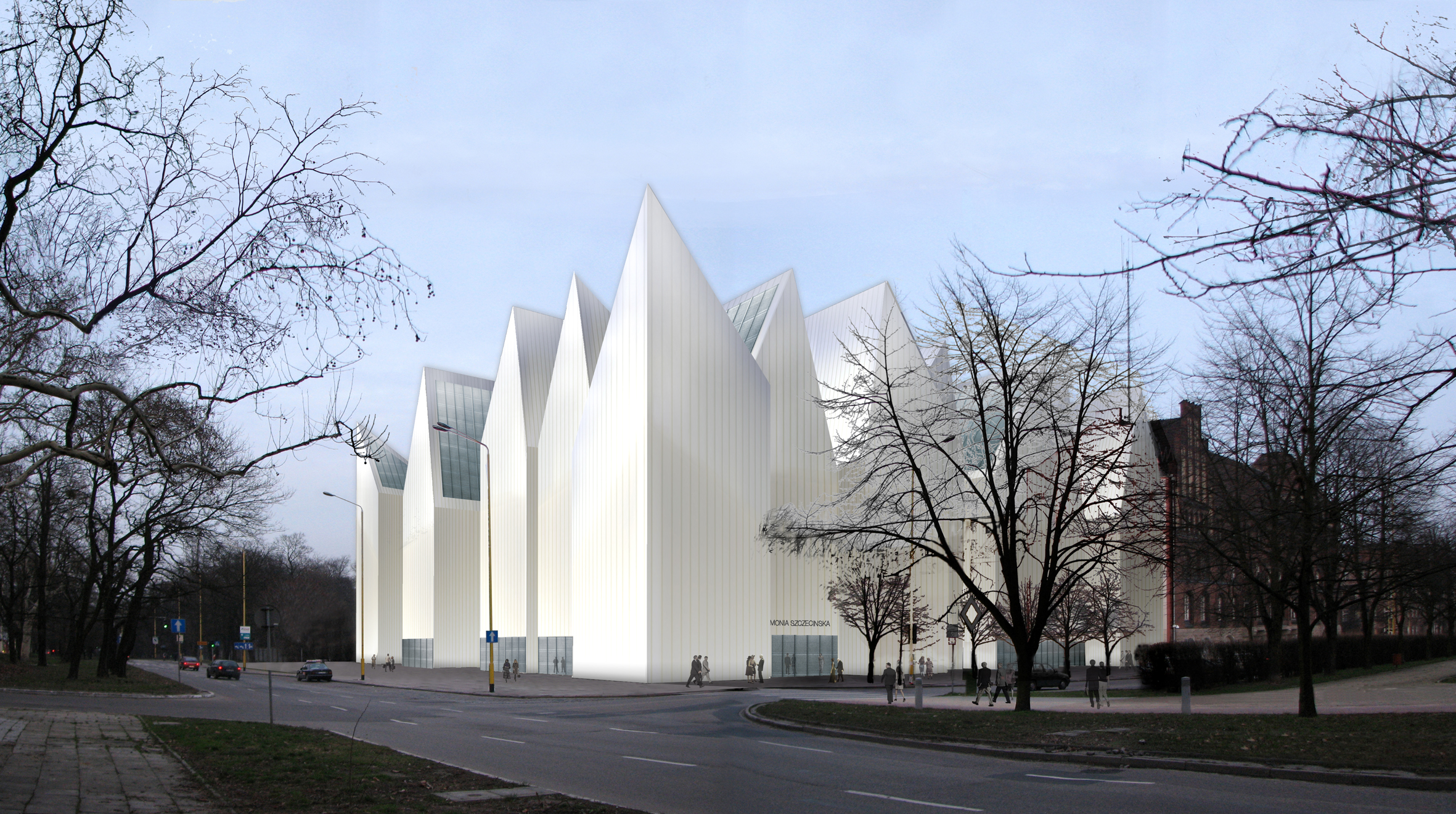
Szczecin Philharmonic, by Barozzi Veiga

- AIA Gold Medal – Moshe Safdie
- Architecture Firm Award AIA – Ehrlich Architects
- Carbuncle Cup – 20 Fenchurch Street ('The Walkie-Talkie')
- Driehaus Architecture Prize for New Classical Architecture – David M. Schwarz, United States
- Emporis Skyscraper Award – Shanghai Tower designed by Jun Xia
- European Union Prize for Contemporary Architecture (Mies van der Rohe Prize) – Szczecin Philharmonic Hall, by Barozzi Veiga
- Lawrence Israel Prize – Tony Chi
- Praemium Imperiale Architecture Laureate – Dominique Perrault
- Pritzker Architecture Prize – Frei Otto, Germany (posthumous)
- RAIA Gold Medal – Peter Stutchbury
- RIBA Royal Gold Medal – O'Donnell & Tuomey, Ireland
- RIBA Stirling Prize – Allford Hall Monaghan Morris for Burntwood School
- Thomas Jefferson Medal in Architecture – Herman Hertzberger
- Twenty-five Year Award by AIA – Skidmore, Owings & Merrill LLP for Broadgate Exchange House

== Exhibitions ==
- April 24 – August 2 – "Drawing Ambience: Alvin Boyarsky and the Architectural Association" at the RISD Museum in Providence, Rhode Island.
- May 1 until October 31 – Expo 2015 held in Milan, Italy.

== Deaths ==
- January 16 – Sir Ian Athfield, 74, New Zealand architect
- January 18 – Verma Panton, 78, Jamaican architect
- February 9 – Jon Jerde, 75, American architect
- March 9 – Frei Otto, 89, German architect and structural engineer
- March 12 – Michael Graves, 80, American architect
- April 28 – Einar Thorsteinn, 73. Icelandic architect
- March 19 – Carlos Mijares Bracho, 84, Mexican architect
- May 11 – Derek Walker, 85, English architect and urban planner
- May 16 – Charles Correa, 84, Indian architect
- May 31 – Françoise-Hélène Jourda, 60, French architect
- June 12 – James Gowan, 92, Scottish-born architect
- June 26 – Donald Wexler, 89, American architect
- June 28 – Robert C. Broward, 89, American architect
- November 7 – Pancho Guedes, 90, Portuguese architect and artist
- December 11 – Ken Woolley, 82, Australian architect
- December 19 – Stephen Jelicich, 92, Croatian born New Zealand architect

== See also ==
- Timeline of architecture
