= St Peter's Church, Westleigh, Greater Manchester =

Coordinates: 53.4984°N 2.5376°W

St Peter's Church, Westleigh
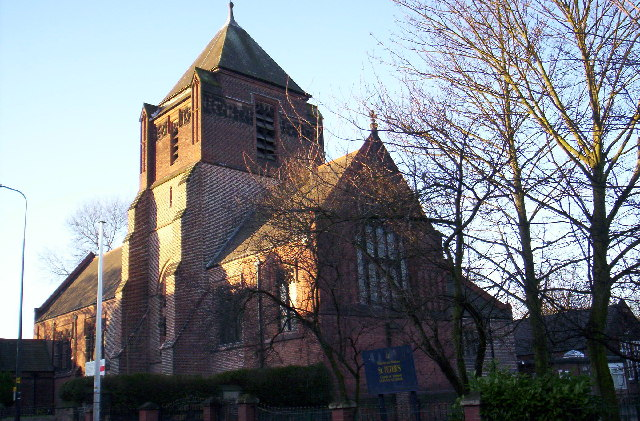
- St Peter's Church, Westleigh, from the southeast

- Location in Greater Manchester
- OS grid reference: SD 644,003
- Location: Firs Lane, Westleigh, Leigh, Greater Manchester
- Country: England
- Denomination: Anglican
- Website: St Peter Westleigh

History
- Status: Parish church
- Dedication: Saint Peter
- Consecrated: 1881

Architecture
- Functional status: Active
- Heritage designation: Grade II*
- Designated: 27 July 1987
- Architect: Paley and Austin
- Architectural type: Church
- Style: Gothic Revival
- Groundbreaking: 1879
- Completed: 1881
- Construction cost: £7,000

Specifications
- Materials: Brick with sandstone dressings, Slate roof

Administration
- Province: York
- Diocese: Manchester
- Archdeaconry: Salford
- Deanery: Leigh
- Parish: St Peter Westleigh

Clergy
- Vicar: Revd J M Cooper

St Peter's Church is in Firs Lane, Westleigh, a district of Leigh, Greater Manchester, England. It is an active Anglican parish church in the deanery of Leigh, the archdeaconry of Salford, and the diocese of Manchester. The church is recorded in the National Heritage List for England as a designated Grade II* listed building. It was designed by the Lancaster architects Paley and Austin. The architectural historians Pollard and Pevsner describe it as "one of their most radical and thrilling churches".

== History ==
Building of the church started in 1879 and it was completed and consecrated in 1881. It cost £7,000 (equivalent to £740,000 as of 2025), and provided seating for 460 people.

== Architecture ==
The church is constructed in red brick with Runcorn sandstone dressings. It has a slate roof. Its plan consists of a three-bay nave with a north aisle and a south porch, a two-bay chancel with a north vestry, and a central tower. Along the sides of the church are two-light flat-headed windows with Decorated tracery. The porch is gabled and has a niche for a statue above the doorway. The tower has buttresses, a three-light transomed window, and flat-headed bell openings. At the top of the tower is a parapet with an ashlar frieze below it, and a pyramidal roof. The east and west windows have five and four transomed lights respectively.

Inside the church the arcade between the nave and north aisle is carried on circular sandstone columns with moulded capitals. The stone reredos contains four niches with statues. The alabaster pulpit is large and elaborate; it was formerly in Manchester Cathedral. The stained glass in the east window dates from 1949 and is by Abbott and Company of Lancaster. The font incorporates polygonal shafts of green marble.

== See also ==
- Grade II* listed buildings in Greater Manchester
- List of ecclesiastical works by Paley and Austin
- Listed buildings in Leigh, Greater Manchester
