= Light Oaks Hall =

Listed building in Glazebury, Greater Manchester, England

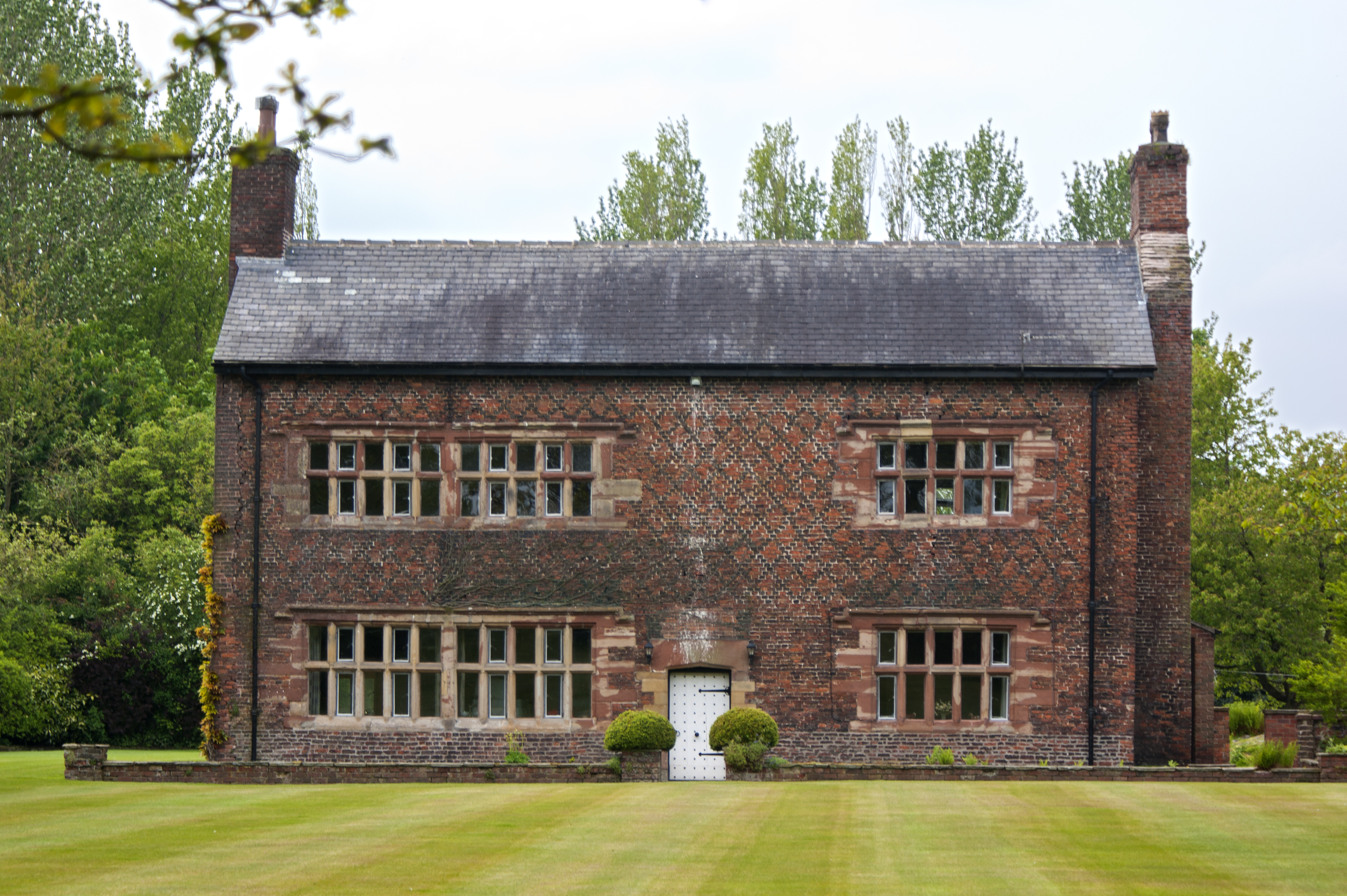
- Light Oaks Hall in 2012

- Location within Greater Manchester

General information
- Architectural style: Vernacular
- Location: Light Oaks Road, Glazebury, Greater Manchester, England
- Coordinates: 53.4661°N 2.4901°W
- Year built: Early 17th century
- Renovated: 20th century (extended)

Listed Building – Grade II*
- Official name: Light Oaks Hall
- Designated: 7 November 1966
- Reference no.: 1068483

Light Oaks Hall is a Grade II* listed building on Light Oaks Road, east of Glazebury, a village in the Metropolitan Borough of Wigan, Greater Manchester, England. Historically part of Lancashire, it is an example of early 17th-century domestic vernacular architecture and is now a private residence.

== History ==
The hall dates from the early 17th century, and an interior panel bears the date 1657, which may indicate a phase of construction or refurbishment. Light Oaks Hall was built as a gentry house and originally formed part of a larger residence, of which only two bays and two storeys survive. In the 20th century the left gable was rebuilt, and the rear of the building was also extended.

On 7 November 1966, Light Oaks Hall was designated a Grade II* listed building for its architectural and historic significance.

In February 2024, two related applications were submitted to Wigan Council for development within the grounds of Light Oaks Hall. The applications sought planning permission and listed building consent for a scheme that included the demolition of an existing storage barn, the construction of two semi-detached dwellings, and the conversion of an outbuilding into a garage and store, together with associated landscaping and access works.

In November 2024, an application for listed building consent was submitted proposing gates and pillars up to 1.8 metres (5 ft 11 in) in height, a new driveway and turning head with vehicle access from Light Oaks Road to the hall's courtyard, and the removal of the existing courtyard brick wall. The application was refused in May 2025. In its decision notice, the council stated that the development, because of its scale, siting and design, and the loss of a boundary wall, would overly domesticate the hall's rural and agricultural setting and would harm its character, setting, and the appearance of the wider complex. Light Oaks Hall is currently in use as a private residence and is not open to the public.

== Architecture ==
The building is constructed of brick with stone dressings and a slate roof. The surviving structure comprises two bays of what was originally a three-bay house. The windows include, in bay 1, a 10-light double-chamfered stone-mullioned window with a king mullion on each floor, and in bay 2, similar five-light mullioned windows. All windows are fitted with hood moulds. The doorway retains its original studded door, set within a heavy chamfered surround and topped by an obtuse-angled lintel. The first floor is decorated with a lozenge pattern in black brick headers.

A projecting chimney stack stands on the right gable end. Inside, the entrance opens directly into the house-part, which contains 17th-century oak panelling, including three armorial panels and a fourth panel combining arms with the date 1657. The room also has three heavy ovolo-moulded beams with stepped stops.

The architectural historian Pevsner described the east elevation as "spectacular," noting its arrangement of large mullioned-and-transomed windows and suggesting that the house was originally much larger than the surviving portion.

== Location and setting ==
The hall faces east, overlooking a lawned front garden. As of 2021, its former outbuildings lay to the north, including a barn that had already been converted. Among these was an altered single-storey structure dating from the 19th century, understood to have served as a shant, or agricultural worker's dwelling. At that time, this building was the subject of proposals for conversion into a single-bed apartment. A modern storage shed was also present, which was included in planning applications proposing its demolition and replacement with new dwellings.

== See also ==
- Grade II* listed buildings in Greater Manchester
- Listed buildings in Leigh, Greater Manchester
