= Herbert Kastinger =

Austrian architect

Olympic medal record

Art competitions
Bronze medal – third place	1936 Berlin	Architectural design

Herbert Kastinger (July 1, 1900 – August 5, 1937) was an Austrian architect. In 1936 he won a bronze medal together with Hermann Stiegholzer in the art competitions of the Olympic Games for their "Kampfstätte in Wien" ("Sporting Centre in Vienna").
