= Luke Lowe =

English footballer

Personal information
- Date of birth: 1889
- Place of birth: Wigan, England
- Position: Outside forward

Senior career*
| Years | Team | Apps | (Gls) |
| 19xx–1911 | Eccles Borough | | |
| 1911–1912 | Burnley | 1 | (0) |
| 1912–19xx | Accrington Stanley | | |
- * Club domestic league appearances and goals

Luke Lowe (1889–?) was an English professional footballer who played as an outside forward. He played for Eccles Borough before moving to Football League Second Division side Burnley in December 1911. He played his only senior match for Burnley on 16 December 1911 in the 1–1 draw away at Huddersfield Town. Lowe left Burnley in February 1912 and subsequently signed for Lancashire Combination outfit Accrington Stanley.
