= Leigh Town Hall =

Municipal building in Leigh, Greater Manchester, England

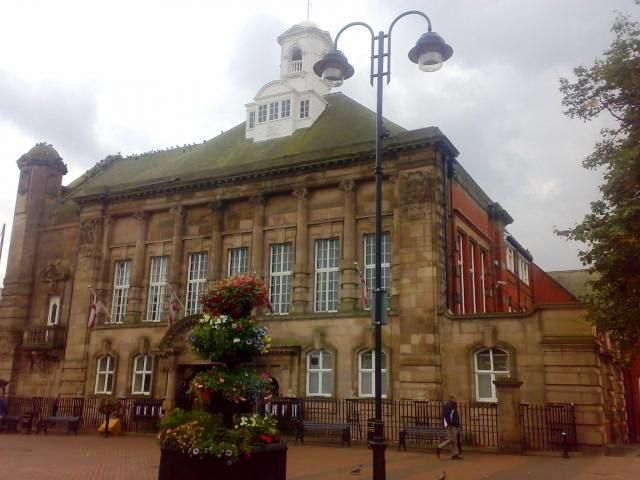
- Leigh Town Hall

- Shown in Greater Manchester
- 53.497°N 2.519°W
- Location: Market Street, Leigh

History
- Built: 1907

Site notes
- Architect: J.C. Prestwich
- Architectural style: Edwardian Baroque style

Listed Building – Grade II
- Designated: 27 July 1987
- Reference no.: 1163007

Leigh Town Hall is a municipal building in Leigh, Greater Manchester, England. It stands in Civic Square at the junction with Market Street, facing Leigh parish church. It was built in 1907 and granted grade II listed building status in 1987.

== History ==
The current building was commissioned to replace an earlier town hall in King Street which had been used as a police station until it was acquired by the council in 1875.

The new building was designed for Leigh Borough Council by J.C. Prestwich, who had an architectural practice in the town, in the Edwardian Baroque style. Work began in 1904 and, after construction works costing £60,000 had been completed, the building was opened in 1907. Nikolaus Pevsner described the building as "An exceptionally good building, expressive yet not showy".

On 18 May 1938 King George VI and Queen Elizabeth visited the town hall and talked to a local soldier, Private Alfred Wilkinson, who had been awarded the Victoria Cross in the First World War.

The town hall was the headquarters of the Municipal Borough of Leigh but it ceased to be the local seat of government when the Metropolitan Borough of Wigan was formed in 1974.

After launching an appeal, the council secured a grant of £1.3 million from the National Lottery Heritage Fund so allowing its contractor, Walter Carefoot and Sons, to start work in 2019 refurbishing the town hall and establishing a new home for the borough's archives as well as a new public searchroom on the ground floor. Three empty shops are also being converted to create new archives and museum exhibition space under the title "Revealing Wigan Archives".

== Architecture ==
The town hall, designed in the Edwardian Baroque style, has two main facades, its main entrance faces the Civic Square, with a walk of fame, "Believe Square", featuring local stars, and another lined with nine shops faces Market Street. Roughly U-shaped in plan, the building is three storeys high with basements and an attic. It is built in Darley Dale sandstone ashlar under a steeply pitched Westmorland green slate roof with a belvedere and ornamental cupola. The three-storey main facade has eight bays of which bays two to eight are symmetrical demarcated by flat pilasters extending from ground level to the roof cornice and from first-floor level, blocked columns with Ionic capitals. The ground floor is solid and plain with an elaborate entrance porch which has paired, blocked columns with Ionic capitals supporting a semi-circular pediment bearing the borough's sculptured coat of arms. The first bay has a glazed door with a pediment above and balcony with a stone balustrade to a first-floor committee room. The balcony is supported on scrolled brackets with acanthus leaves and a carved figure. To the left of the first bay is an octagonal corner turret rising from a carved base surmounted by a dome.

The Market Street elevation is symmetrical with seven bays of which the end bays have gables and oriel windows at first floor level and a round window on the second floor. There is a smaller bow window in the central bay.

Inside is a large entrance hall with scagliola columns and an imperial staircase which accesses the council chamber and mayor's parlour on the first floor. The council chamber has stained glass windows representing some of the town's industries and there are coats of arms on the staircase windows all by H. Gustave Hiller.

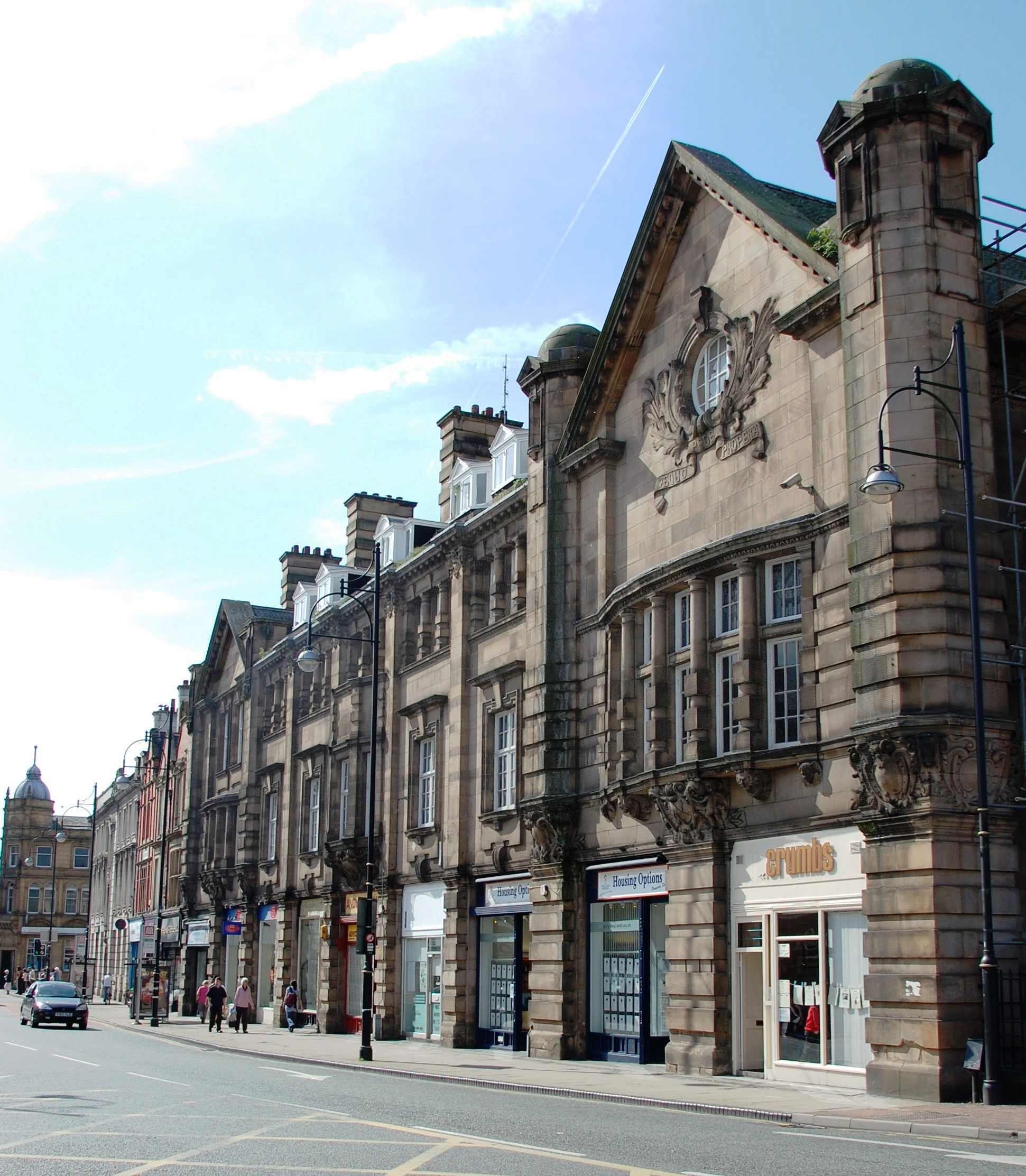
Market Street facade

== See also ==
- Listed buildings in Leigh, Greater Manchester
