= Walter Napier =

English footballer

Personal information
- Full name: Walter Henry Napier
- Date of birth: 1875
- Place of birth: Wigan, England
- Position: Goalkeeper

Senior career*
Years	Team	Apps	(Gls)
1895	Burnley	1	(0)
- * Club domestic league appearances and goals

Walter Henry Napier (born 1875, date of death unknown) was an English professional footballer who played as a goalkeeper. He signed for Football League First Division side Burnley in May 1895. He played his only senior match for the club on 2 September 1895 in the 1–5 defeat away at West Bromwich Albion and left the club shortly afterwards.
