= Hermann Stiegholzer =

Austrian architect

Olympic medal record

Art competitions
| Bronze medal – third place | 1936 Berlin | Architectural design |

Hermann Stiegholzer (July 12, 1894 – October 21, 1982) was an Austrian architect. In 1936 he won a bronze medal together with Herbert Kastinger in the art competitions of the Olympic Games for his "Kampfstätte in Wien" ("Sporting Centre in Vienna").
