= Canal warehouse =

Commercial building associated with canals

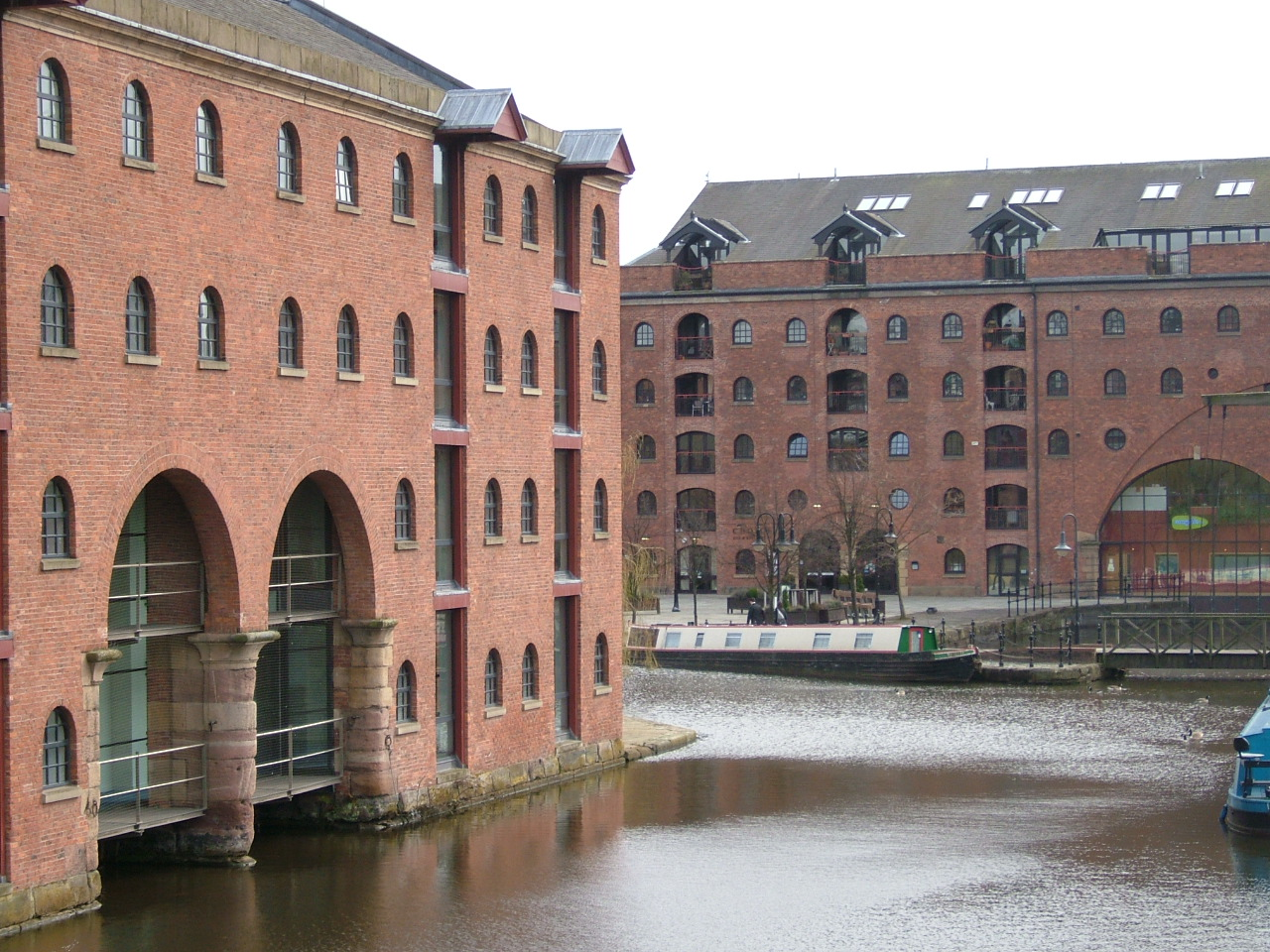
Merchants' and Middle Warehouse, Castlefield

A canal warehouse is a commercial building principally associated with the expansions of canals from 1761 to 1896. This type of warehouse derived from coastal predecessors, had unique features: it had internal water filled canal arms that entered the building, it was multistorey with canal access at one level and road and even rail egress at another, and has a hoist system powered by a water wheel or at later stages steam. Canal warehouses were transhipment warehouses, holding goods until they could be shipped out to their next recipient. The first true canal warehouse was the Dukes Warehouse, at the Bridgewater Canal Basin in Castlefield, Manchester built in 1761. It has been demolished, but two later warehouses at Castlefield have been restored. The later Portland Basin warehouse, was built in 1834 by the architect, David Bellhouse. It has three shipping arms, and continued to be used as a storage warehouse after its serving canal became disused.

David Bellhouse was responsible for designing the first railway warehouse at Liverpool Road railway station in 1830, and the features of the canal warehouse were incorporated into a transhipment warehouse for this new form of transport.

The last canal warehouse was the Great Northern Railway Company Warehouse massive warehouse off Deansgate in Manchester. This was built in 1896 over the Manchester and Salford Junction Canal, it had road access on two levels, rail lines entering on two levels and a transhipment floor of 26,730 m^{2}.

== See also ==
- Canal house

== Bibliography ==
- Nevell, Mike; Walker, John (2001), Portland Basin and the archaeology of the Canal Warehouse, Tameside Metropolitan Borough with University of Manchester Archaeological Unit, ISBN 1-871324-25-4
- Parkinson-Bailey, John J. (2000). Manchester: an architectural history. Manchester University Press. ISBN 0-7190-5606-3.
