= Ian Murphy (artist) =

British artist

- Born: 1963/03/09; Wigan, UK
- Education: Sheffield Hallam University
- Occupations: Artist; Art educator
- Notable work: The "Hutong" series and "Wuruhen Mis"
- Website: www.ianmurphyartist.com

Ian Murphy (born 1963) is a British fine artist and art educator. He has been an artist in residence at educational institutions in England and around the world.

== Personal life and education ==
Murphy attended Cardinal Newman CR High School in Wigan, England. He graduated from Sheffield Hallam University in 1985 with a BA (Hons) in Fine Art, Painting and Printmaking.

== Artwork ==
Murphy primarily works with drawing, painting and mixed media, taking inspiration from locations around the world that he has visited, with a focus on architecture. He uses a limited, neutral palette. Exhibitions have included: Drumcroon, Wigan (1991), Parsons Walk, Wigan (1991), Crewe and Alsager College (2003) and Heseltine Gallery, Banbury (2003, 2007, 2009, 2012).

== Artist in residence ==
In the 1980s and 1990s, he was a member of the Artists in Wigan Schools Scheme. Established by Rod Taylor in 1984, the scheme placed an artist, with their own studio space, into every school in Wigan, and from there they would work on their own art, exhibit and teach. The studio space Murphy used from 1986 to 1987 at the Tyldesley County Primary (TCP) School subsequently became the 'Murphy Room', a permanent gallery space for artists to display their work. He was also AiR at Drumcroon, Wigan Education Art Centre from 1990 to 1991.

Since the 1990s, Murphy has delivered artist in residence courses around the UK and internationally, including Dubai, Singapore, Hong Kong and Thailand.
