= Verma Panton =

Jamaican architect (1936–2015)

- Born: Verma Wevlyn Panton; 17 April 1936; St. Elizabeth, Colony of Jamaica, British Empire
- Died: 18 January 2015 (aged 78); Jamaica
- Occupation: architect
- Years active: 1964–2015
- Known for: First female architect of the Anglo-Caribbean and Jamaica

Verma Wevlyn Panton (17 April 1936 – 18 January 2015) was a Jamaican architect, the first female architect of the Anglo-Caribbean.

== Biography ==
Panton was born 17 April 1936 in St. Elizabeth, Jamaica to Laura Louise (née Walker) and Vernon George Panton. Verma has two sisters: Faith (Baba) Panton and Sheila C Panton and one brother Cedrick Landale Leroy Panton. Faith died of cancer on October 31, 1991 in a nursing home in Santa Monica, CA USA. Faith and Sheila were never married and had no children. Verma has two nephews: Cedric Vernon Panton and Corrado L Panton, and one niece Brenda Panton. She attended elementary school at Claremont Primary School and then went to both Carvalho’s High School and Ardenne High School in Jamaica. Having completed her secondary education, she worked from 1956 to 1958 as an Assistant Land Surveyor in the Survey Department, when she won a government scholarship to further her education. Panton attended McGill University School of Architecture in Montreal, Quebec, Canada graduating as the first female architect in Jamaica as well as in the West Indies.

Returning to Jamaica in 1964, Panton became a Project Architect for the Ministry of Education until 1968, when she joined as an Associate Partner with the firm of McMorris, Sibley, Robinson (MSR). In 1974, she chaired the committee to organize the Pan American Federation of Architects Conference. Panton left MSR in 1982 and became a Partner and the Director of the Landmark Development Company, where she remained for the next two years, leaving in 1984 to open her own practice. She was one of the founding members of the Jamaican Architects Registration Board which was formed in 1987 and served in various capacities of leadership.

Panton received numerous awards for her work, including Honourable Mention in two Low Income Housing Design Competitions: the 1967 event sponsored by Wood Preservation Co. Ltd. and the 1973 event sponsored by Redimix Concrete Ltd. In 1985, she was honoured with a Certificate of Recognition for Pioneer Woman in Architecture and Outstanding Achievement in the Field of Architecture. The Jamaican Institute of Architects recognized her 20 years of service in 1987.

Panton died on 18 January 2015 in Jamaica.

== Works ==
- Gordon Town Community Center
- Workers Bank Building, Constant Spring, Jamaica
- Botany Building at the University of the West Indies, Mona, Jamaica
- Desmond Mair Insurance Building on Knutsford Blvd., Kingston, Jamaica
- Restoration of the Old Half Way Tree Courthouse

== Sources ==
- Sleeman, Elizabeth (2001). The International Who's Who of Women 2002. London, England: Psychology Press. ISBN 978-1-85743-122-3.
