= Andy Ainscow =

English footballer (born 1968)

Personal information
- Full name: Andrew Paul Ainscow
- Date of birth: 1 October 1968 (age 58)
- Place of birth: Orrell, Lancashire, England
- Position: Forward

Senior career*
Years	Team	Apps	(Gls)
1987–1989	Wigan Athletic	22	(4)
1989–1990	Rotherham United	1	(0)
1990–?	Garswood United	?	(?)
- Altrincham
- Rhyl

International career
1986	England Youth	1	(0)
- * Club domestic league appearances and goals

Andrew Paul Ainscow (born 1 October 1968) is an English former football striker. He played in the Football League for Wigan Athletic and Rotherham United.

A product of the youth system at Wigan Athletic. England Youth International gained 3 caps against Brazil, Hungary and France - scoring 1 goal against France. Ainscow made his Wigan Athletic debut against Doncaster Rovers, scoring the winner on debut in a 2–1 victory at Springfield Park. He made 22 Football League appearances for the club, scoring four goals. During his first regular run of matches he sustained a serious broken leg in a league match away at Gillingham, eventually returning to Wigan's first team after six operations and nearly 2 seasons out. After leaving the club he made a single appearance for Rotherham United before dropping out of the league in 1990 due to being forced to retire because of ongoing issues with his previous broken leg. He then went to play one season in Australia for Sorrento AFC in Western Australia. Returned to UK to sign for Garswood United.

In 2013 Ainscow was listed as the under-15s coach for Wigan Athletic L.F.C, before becoming the open-age team manager.
