= James Caldwell Prestwich =

British architect (1852–1940)

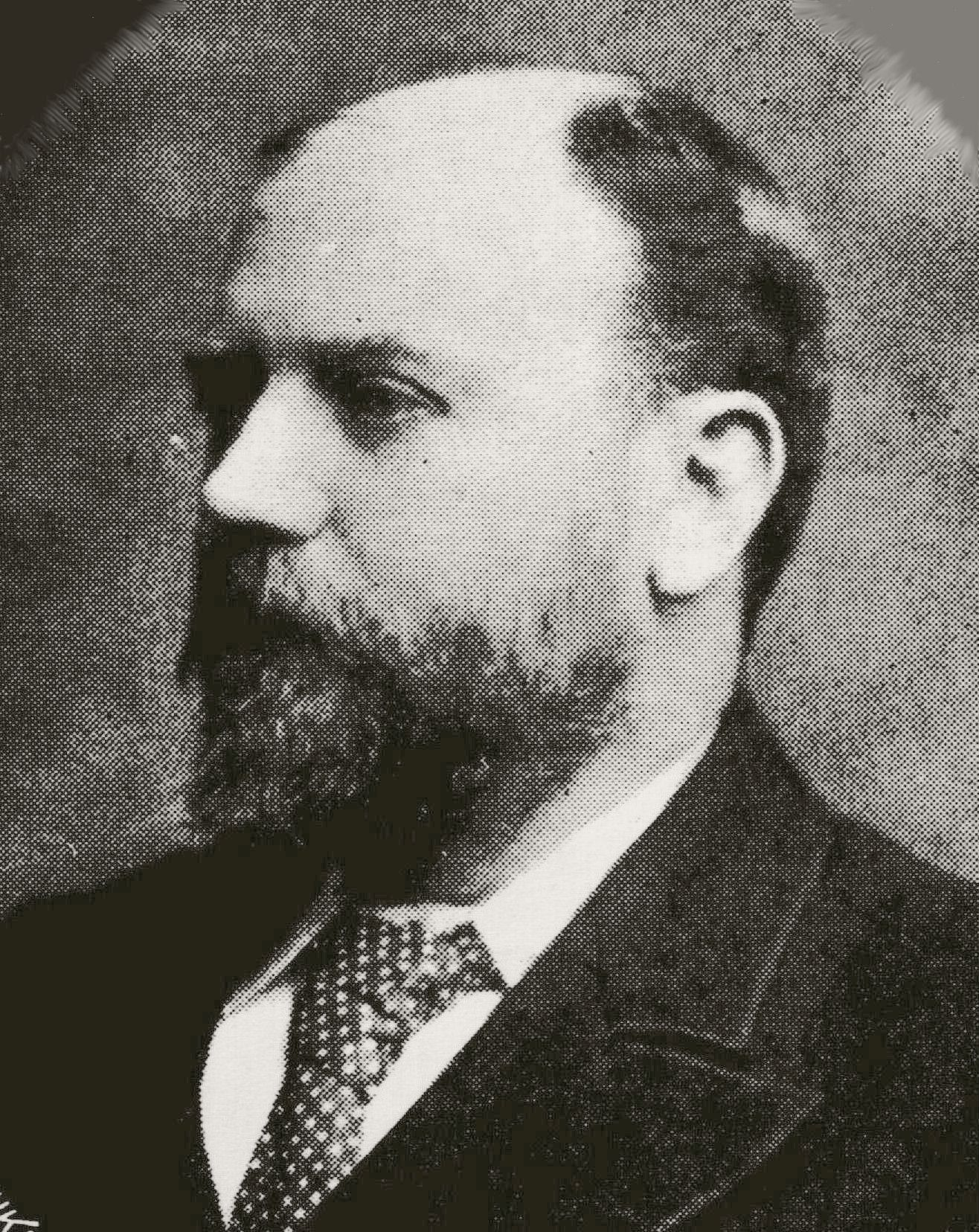
- Prestwich in 1901
- Born: 1852; Atherton, Lancashire, (Note: Now part of Greater Manchester) England
- Died: 1940 (aged 87–88)
- Occupation: Architect
- Children: 2, including Ernest

James Caldwell Prestwich (1852–1940) was an English architect.

== Background ==
Prestwich was born in Atherton, Lancashire, and educated at Leigh and Nantwich Grammar Schools.

== Career ==
Prestwich trained to be an architect in London and returned to Leigh in 1875 to start an architectural practice which he worked in until 1930 and which was continued by his son. He produced many buildings in Leigh and Nicholas Pevsner remarked that "Any building of any merit (in Leigh) which is not a church or a mill is almost certainly by the local firm of J.C. Prestwich & Sons, capable – sometimes very capable – in a number of styles." J. C. Prestwich & Sons included Prestwich and two of his sons: Harold Oswald Prestwich and Ernest Prestwich.

== Works ==
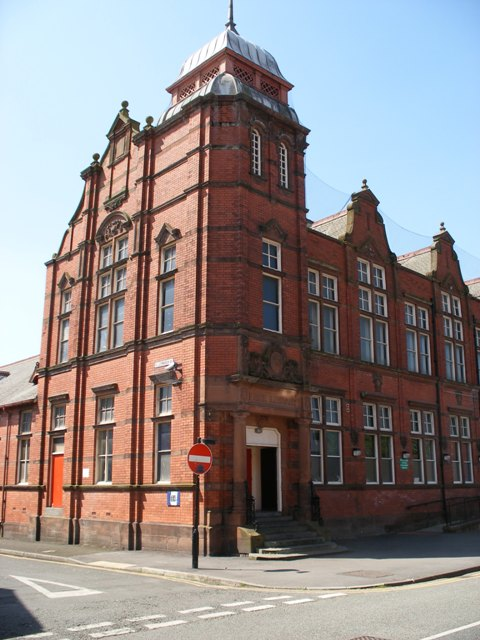
The old Leigh Technical College in redbrick designed by J. C. Prestwich

Several of Prestwich's buildings survive including the Central Buildings on Bradshawgate which were built for the Leigh Friendly Co-operative Society, Leigh Cenotaph, Leigh Technical School and Library on Railway Road, Leigh Town Hall, Leigh Infirmary, and numerous shops, public houses, business premises, and houses in Pennington. Other buildings have been demolished including Leigh Public Baths and Leigh Union workhouse hospital. Prestwich designed other public buildings including Tyldesley Library and Atherton Town Hall. Further afield, he designed public baths in Ashton-in-Makerfield, Northampton, and Stockport, as well as schools in Atherton, Southport, Birkdale, and Hindley.

== Institutions ==
Prestwich was a fellow of the Manchester Society of Architects and practised until 1930. His son Harold joined the practice in 1908.
