= Stalag III-D =

- Berlin
- Memorial plaque

Site information
- Type: Prisoner-of-war camp
- Controlled by: Nazi Germany

Location
- Germany, 1937
- Location within Germany
- Coordinates: 52.4106°N 13.3210°E

Site history
- In use: 1940–1945
- Battles/wars: World War II

Garrison information
- Occupants: Belgian, British, French, Yugoslav, Soviet, Polish, American, Italian, Czechoslovak prisoners of war

Stalag III-D was a World War II German Army prisoner-of-war camp located in Berlin.

== Camp history ==
The camp was established on 14 August 1940 on the corner of Landweg and Osdorfer Straße in Berlin-Lichterfelde. The commandant and camp administration offices (Kommandantur) were later located at Belle-Alliance-Straße 106-107, in Kreuzberg. With prisoners from Belgium, Cyprus, Other countries under the Common Wealth, United Kingdom, France, Yugoslavia, Soviet Union, Poland, United States, Italy and Czechoslovakia, the camp's maximum capacity was 58,000 men. Prisoners were mostly allocated to sub-camps (Zweiglager) and work details (Arbeitskommando) in and around the city. Their medical needs were provided by Reserve Lazarett ("Reserve Hospital") 119 at Neukölln and RL 128 at Berlin-Biesdorf.

== Sub-camps ==
Prisoners of Stalag III-D were also housed in a number of sub-camps (Zweiglager), designated Stalag III-D/Z:

- Falkensee
- Groß Schulzendorf, Zossen
- Wutzetz, Friesack (closed late 1943)
- Damm I, Friesack
- Damm II, Friesack (closed late 1943)
- Wustrau I, Neuruppin (closed late 1943)
- Wustrau II, Neuruppin
- Zietenhorst, near Wustrau (closed late 1943)
- Kirchhain/Niederlausitz (transferred from Stalag III-B late 1944)

Two further sub-camps; Stalag III-D/999 in Zehlendorf West, Berlin, and Stalag III-D/517 at Genshagen, Ludwigsfelde, were created in May–June 1943 as "Holiday Camps", offering better living conditions, and a steady diet of propaganda, in an attempt to persuade prisoners into joining the British Free Corps. The Germans particularly sought out former members and sympathizers of the British Union of Fascists, but the attempt was largely a failure with the unit never numbering more than about 30 men at any time. A small number of men from these camps also joined the staff of the Ministry of Propaganda, working for radio stations and magazines. A similar camp at Friesack, designated Stalag XX-A (301), was established to recruit Irishmen serving in the British Army.

== See also ==
- List of prisoner-of-war camps in Germany
