= Peelwood Colliery =

Coal mine in England

Coordinates: 53.5272°N 2.4646°W

Peelwood Colliery was a coal mine operating on the Manchester Coalfield after 1883 in Shakerley, Tyldesley, Greater Manchester, then in the historic county of Lancashire, England.

Shaft sinking at Peelwood began in 1878 and the colliery opened in 1883. The colliery, owned by the Tyldesley Coal Company, was situated to the east of Shakerley Lane on the south side of the Lancashire and Yorkshire Railway's Manchester to Southport line and where the company had a siding. A fault caused the company to sink another shaft, the Daisy Pit, to win coal from seams close to the surface.

The colliery's two 13 feet diameter shafts north of the Wharton Hall Fault accessed the Trencherbone at 335 yards and Black and White mines at 170 yards. Coal was extracted by room and pillar working in the Black and White mine and longwall mining in the Trencherbone. Coal was wound at both shafts.

In 1896 the colliery employed 262 underground and 104 surface workers. By the time the pit closed, coal had been got from the Three Feet, Four Feet, Cannel, Plodder, Haigh Yard and Arley mines. In 1923 the colliery had 319 underground and 72 surface workers and produced gas, household and steam coal. The pit closed in 1929.

The colliery was linked to the company's other pits, Combermere and Cleworth Hall, by a mineral railway which had exchange sidings with the Tyldesley Loopline. After 1888 an exchange siding was constructed next to the Lancashire and Yorkshire Railway's line from Manchester to Wigan, providing access for the company's coal traffic.

== See also ==
- List of Collieries in Astley and Tyldesley
- Glossary of coal mining terminology
