= Astley and Tyldesley Collieries =

English coal company

The Astley and Tyldesley Collieries Company formed in 1900 owned coal mines on the Lancashire Coalfield south of the railway in Astley and Tyldesley, then in the historic county of Lancashire, England. The company became part of Manchester Collieries in 1929 and some of its collieries were nationalised in 1947.

== Geology ==
The company's collieries were on a part of the Manchester Coalfield whose coal seams were laid down in the Carboniferous period, where some easily accessible seams were worked on a small scale before the Industrial Revolution, and extensively from the mid-19th century until the middle of the 20th century. The Coal Measures lie above a bed of Millstone Grit and are interspersed with sandstones, mudstones, shales, and fireclays. The most productive seams are in the lower two thirds of the Middle Coal Measures where coal is mined from seams between the Worsley Four Foot and Arley mines. (Note: In this part of Lancashire a coal seam is referred to as a mine and the coal mine as a colliery or pit.) The Coal Measures generally dip towards the south and west. Numerous small faults affect the coalfield.

== History ==
In the 1840s, John Darlington leased the mineral rights of land belonging to Astley Hall and sank a pit, Astley Colliery, which subsequently became the site of Gin Pit Colliery. It was near other old shafts on Meanley's Farm. Coal had been mined in Astley before this date, on an old enclosure map North Lane was titled the "Coal Road" and later was known as "North Coal Pit Lane".

In 1847 Darlington's company was known as Astley and Bedford Collieries, which had offices at Bedford Lodge in Bedford, Leigh. Gin Pit's name suggests it, or its predecessor, had horse driven winding gear and was on the site of even older coal workings. The colliery site was isolated from roads resulting in Darlington building a narrow gauge tramway worked by horses to transport coal from his pit to a basin on the Bridgewater Canal at Marsland Green. In 1851 Darlington attempted to sell his colliery, tramroad, cranes and tipplers on the canal to the Bridgewater Trustees but the operation was eventually sold to Samuel Jackson, a salt merchant and owner of Bedford Colliery or Milner's Pit which he had bought from W. E. Milner around the same time. Jackson's lease was for coal from the Worsley Four Foot mine and he was required to sink two shafts 14 feet in diameter with no workings under Astley Hall.

A lease of 1857 committed the company to paying the lessors of Astley Hall a minimum annual rent of £1,000 and royalties for the Bin mine of £70 "per foot thick per Cheshire acre", for the Crombouke £95, the Brassey £70, and the Six Foot £95. The lease expired in 1896. By the time the Astley Hall estate was sold in 1889, Astley and Tyldesley Collieries had paid a total of £90,526 for these mines and the Worsley Four Foot mine. The deeper mines, the Seven Feet and the Trencherbone, were not included in the 1857 lease. These coal seams produced steam coal, household coal and coal for Tyldesley's gasworks. About 500 tons of coal per day was raised from the older pits. The Bedford Colliery closed in 1864 and the company concentrated its operations closer to Gin Pit.

== Deep pits ==
The London and North Western Railway (LNWR) opened a line from Eccles to Wigan via Tyldesley and the Tyldesley Loopline via Leigh to Kenyon Junction in 1864, providing the impetus for the rapid exploitation of coal reserves to the south of the railway line. Jackson's Astley and Tyldesley Coal and Salt Company sank two shafts at St Georges Colliery, commonly known as Back o' t' Church, to the south of Tyldesley Station. In 1866, Nook Colliery No 1 Pit, south of Darlington's original Gin Pit was sunk. The company also sank a pit at Cross Hillock south of the Leigh to Manchester road in near Higher Green Lane but flooding caused it to close by 1887. The deep collieries replaced the older pits in the area. A new shaft was sunk at Gin Pit in 1872 and a second shaft a year later at Nook Pit. St George's No 3 pit was sunk in 1883 and by 1899 Nook No 3 was in operation.

In about 1888 it was discovered that miners employed by George Green's Tyldesley Coal Company had exceeded the boundaries of the company's lease and extracted coal south of Well Street which belonged to Astley and Tyldesley Collieries. Lengthy litigation followed resulting in a £3,000 fine for Green's company.

The company was a major employer in the area. In 1896 Nook Pit employed 480 men below ground and 125 workers on the surface. Household and manufacturing coal was produced from the Binn and Crumbouke mines. Gin Pit was smaller employing 240 underground workers and 55 on the surface. Gas coal, household and steam coal was mined from the Crumbouke and Six Foot mines. There were 629 underground workers and 137 surface workers at St Georges colliery producing gas coal, household and steam coal from the Brassey, Crumbouke, Six Feet, Seven Feet and Trencherbone mines. The surface workers included women who sorted coal on the screens at the pit brow.

In 1900 the company became the Astley and Tyldesley Collieries Company, and in 1914 Nook No 4 Pit was sunk. Nook became the largest colliery on the Manchester Coalfield. Jackson's Sidings were built by the LNWR and extended to Gin and Nook Pits and, on the early tramroad, a locomotive replaced the horses. The company built its own standard gauge mineral railway which exchanged traffic with the LNWR at Jackson's Sidings southwest of Tyldesley Station.

Coal was wound to the surface at St George's Colliery, Nook and Gin Pit. Coal for Tyldesley was sold from the landsale yard at St George's and there were smaller yards at Nook and Gin Pit but considerable quantities of coal were sent elsewhere by rail from Jackson's Sidings and by barge from Marsland Green to Partington on the Manchester Ship Canal. There was a brickworks at Nook Colliery and sheds and facilities for servicing the industrial locomotives at Gin Pit. Gin Pit had a sawmill and supplied pit props to neighbouring collieries.

As a result of poor economic conditions, Astley and Tyldesley Collieries merged with other local colliery companies in 1929, becoming part of Manchester Collieries, whose Western Division consisted of John Speakman's Bedford Colliery, Fletcher, Burrows and Company of Atherton and Astley and Tyldesley Collieries.

On nationalisation in 1947 the coal pits belonging to Manchester Collieries became part of the No 1 Manchester Area of the National Coal Board's (NCB) North Western Division. In 1961, the area became the NCB's East Lancashire Area. Gin Pit closed in 1955 and Nook Pit closed in August 1965.

== Locomotives ==
The earliest locomotives that worked on the colliery railway system were a narrow gauge engine that worked the tramway to the Bridgewater Canal possibly named "Gordon" and "Tyldesley", a 6-coupled Manning Wardle saddle tank locomotive, bought in 1868 and renamed "Jackson" in 1872. A 2-2-0 tender locomotive "Lady Cornwall" was sold to George Peace in 1874 by the Lancashire and Yorkshire Railway's works at Miles Platting at a cost of £150 and was later rebuilt as tank engine. In 1875 Manning Wardle supplied "Maden", a 6-coupled tank engine and "Astley" another 6-coupled tank locomotive was bought from Sharp Stewart in 1886. The second "Tyldesley", another 6-coupled tank engine was bought in 1894 from Peckett with "Jackson" taken in part exchange.

The company bought three 0-6-0 side tank locomotives from Lowca Engineering in Whitehaven, "T.B. Wood" in 1897, "James Lord" in 1903 and "George Peace" in 1906. Two unique 0-8-0 side tank locomotives, "Maden" in 1910 and "Emanuell Clegg" in 1924 were built by Naysmith Wilson at Patricroft.

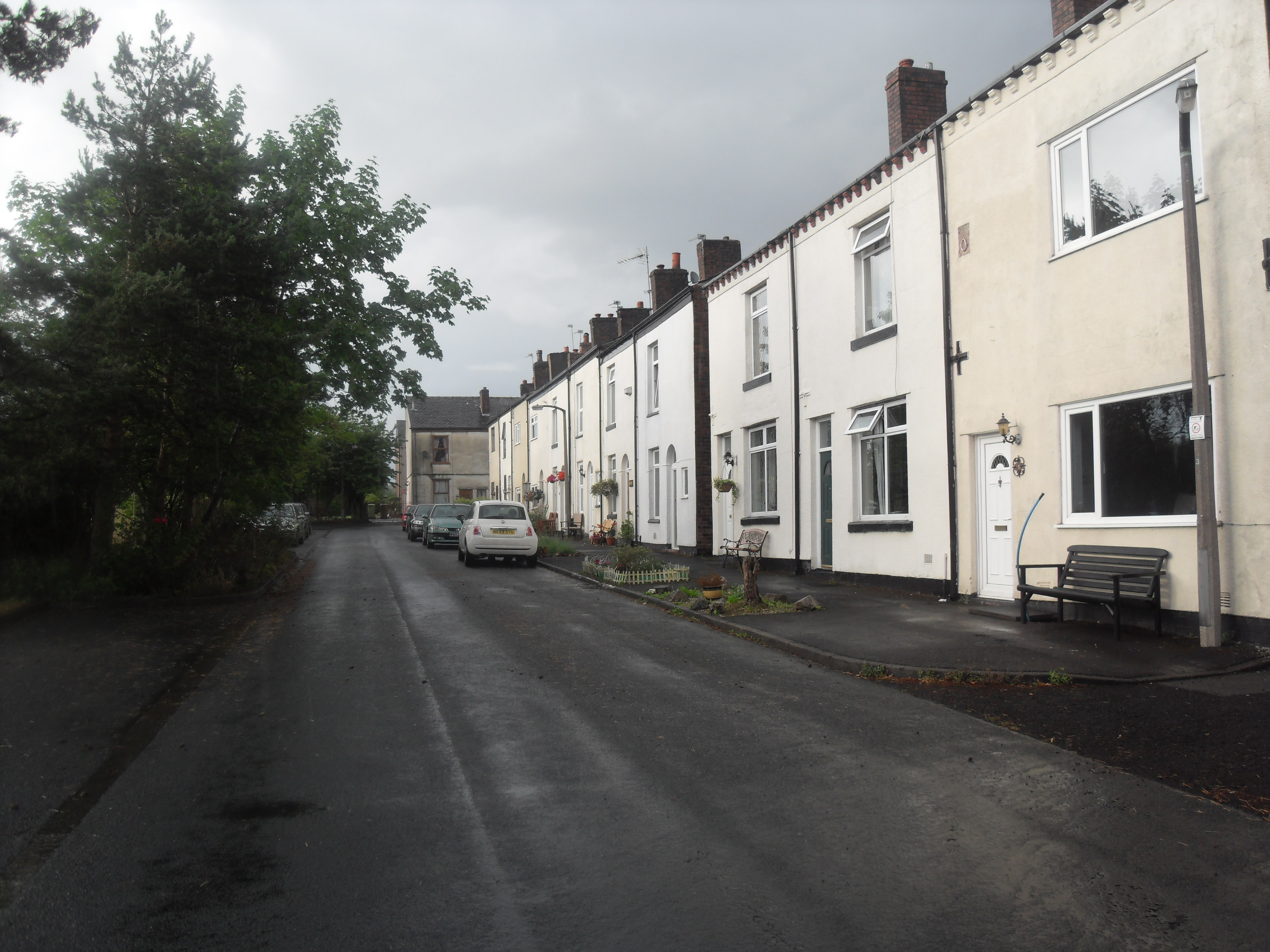
Lord Street, Gin Pit village

== Gin Pit village ==
Gin Pit Colliery was isolated from both Astley and Tyldesley centres. The company built the terraced houses of Gin Pit village to accommodate the workers. Some of the workforce had migrated from Staffordshire. The village streets, Peace Street, Maden Street and Lord Street, are named from former company directors as were the colliery locomotives. The first houses were built around 1874 and more added by 1909. The Astley and Tyldesley Miners' Welfare Club was built by the Miners Union and remains in the village as a social and sports club.

== See also ==
- List of Collieries in Astley and Tyldesley
