= Great Boys Colliery =

Coal mine in England

Coordinates: 53.516°N 2.440°W

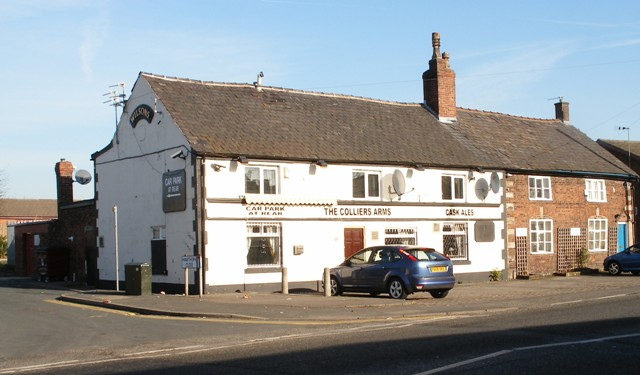
The Colliers Arms

Great Boys Colliery was a coal mine operating on the Manchester Coalfield in the second half of the 19th century in Tyldesley, then in the historic county of Lancashire, England. It was sunk on Great Boys farm, which in 1778 was described as a "messuage with eight Cheshire acres of land" on the north side of Sale Lane west of the Colliers Arms public house. It was owned by William Atkin and sold in 1855 to mineowners, John Fletcher of Bolton and Samuel Scowcroft. By 1869 their partnership was dissolved and the company became John Fletcher and Sons in 1877. Shafts were sunk for a colliery on Pear Tree Farm on the corner of Mort Lane and Sale Lane which appear in the 1867 Mines Lists and became part of Great Boys Colliery. Fletcher and Schofield were granted permission to construct a mineral railway to join the London and North Western Railway's Tyldesley Loopline in 1868 but there is no evidence that it was built. The colliery closed before 1885. The colliery accessed the Brassey mine (coal seam) at about 170 yards and the Six Foot mine at 182 yards. The deeper coal seams were accessed by New Lester Colliery.

The offices and lamproom for the pit occupied the building that is now the Colliers Arms public house, on Sale Lane.

== Disaster ==
On 6 March 1877 eight men died in an explosion of firedamp at the colliery. A further 100 men and boys who were in the mine were burned but survived the explosion.

== See also ==
- List of Collieries in Astley and Tyldesley
- Glossary of coal mining terminology
- List of mining disasters in Lancashire
