= Linnyshaw Colliery =

Coordinates: 53.525°N 2.376°W

Linnyshaw Colliery or Berryfield was a coal mine originally owned by the Bridgewater Trustees operating after 1860 on the Manchester Coalfield in Walkden, Greater Manchester, then in the historic county of Lancashire, England.

== History ==
Linnyshaw Colliery was the first of the Bridgewater Collieries' pits to have shafts exclusively sunk to access the deeper seams of the coalfield. It was sunk to 300 yards and accessed the Binn, Crombouke, Brassey and Seven Foot mines. Ventilation was initially by furnace at the bottom of the No. 2 upcast shaft. This was replaced by a fan made by Walker Brothers of Wigan.

The colliery was operational until 1921 when Sandhole Colliery took over its remaining coal reserves. Pumping water continued until 1936 when the site was finally cleared.
