= New Manchester =

Isolated mining community

Coordinates: 53.5142°N 2.4192°W

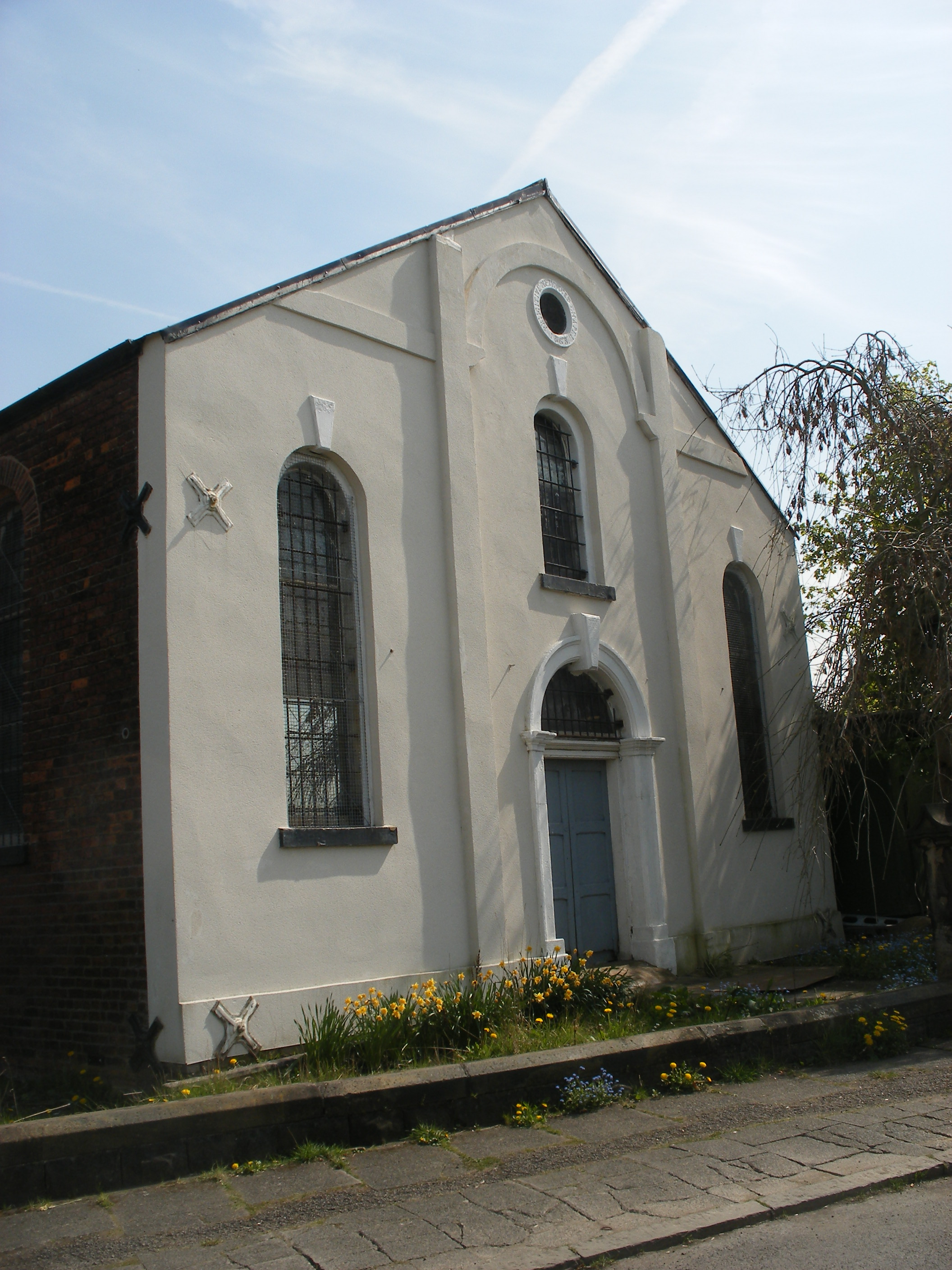
Chapel at New Manchester

New Manchester or The City was an isolated mining community on the Manchester Coalfield north of Mosley Common in the Tyldesley township, England. It lies west of a boundary stone at Ellenbrook which marks the ancient boundary of the Hundreds of Salford and West Derby, the boundary of Eccles and Leigh ecclesiastical parishes, Tyldesley, Worsley and Little Hulton townships and the metropolitan districts of Wigan and Salford. The route of the Roman road from Manchester to Wigan and the Tyldesley Loopline passed south of the village. The Lancashire and Yorkshire Railway's Manchester to Southport line passed to the north.

== History ==
Coal was mined in New Manchester where the coal seams of the Manchester Coalfield outcrop and are not far below the surface. The community was in existence by 1803 in houses provided by the Duke of Bridgewater who owned the mining rights. The men who came to work in the pits named the streets after places in their hometown, Manchester, Shude Hill, Gatley Row and City Road, the only road into the village.

In the 1830s Shude Hill Pit had a steam winding engine. City Pit and Gatley Pit were in operation by 1838 linked to the Worsley Navigable Levels and a horse-drawn tramroad to Mathers Fold. The tramway was extended to link several pits to Bridgewater Canal at Boothstown Basin. These pits worked the Brassey mine (coal seam) at 262 feet and the Rams mine at 360 feet, employed 64 workers in 1852, and were closed in 1877. The area has been opencasted.

== See also ==
- List of Collieries in Astley and Tyldesley
