= Tyldesley Coal Company =

British coal mining company

Tyldesley Coal Company was a coal mining company formed in 1870 in Tyldesley, on the Manchester Coalfield in the historic county of Lancashire, England that had its origins in Yew Tree Colliery, the location for a mining disaster that killed 25 men and boys in 1858.

== History ==
Yew Tree Farm covered about 18 Cheshire acres on the north side of Sale Lane to the east of Tyldesley. In 1845 George Green of Wharton Hall, Little Hulton, and his brother William, leased it and sank a shaft to prospect for coal. This became Yew Tree Colliery. By about 1851 George Green had built a tramroad to link the colliery to the Bridgewater Canal east of Astley Green. At the Tyldesley end, the tramway was worked by cable down the steep slope of the Tyldesley Banks and horse-drawn wagons completed the journey. The tramway was out of use by 1913 when the tipping plant and sidings by the canal were sold to the Clifton and Kersley Coal Company to be used by its colliery at Astley Green.

In 1860 John Holland, a railway contractor from Ireland, joined the company and the Tyldesley Coal Company was formed in 1870. The London and North Western Railway (LNWR) built a line from Eccles to Wigan via Tyldesley and the Tyldesley Loopline via Leigh to Kenyon Junction in 1864 providing the impetus for the exploitation of coal seams in Tyldesley and Greens Sidings were constructed for the company to the east of Tyldesley Station.

After the arrival of the railway the company expanded rapidly. It opened Shakerley Colliery near Shakerley Little Common in 1867, which had the first iron headgear in the country but finished operating in 1878. (A different pit belonging to William Ramsden was also named Shakerley Colliery.) Combermere Colliery in Shakerley opened in 1878 and lasted until 1893. The company built a brickworks at Combermere and the railway to it operated until the mid-1930s.

Cleworth Hall Colliery was sunk under the Cleworth Hall estate to the east of Yew Tree in 1874. In the early 1890s the shafts at Yew Tree were deepened. Cleworth Hall colliery was modernised before the 1914 and the Arley pit shaft equipped with steel headgear and a washery and coal preparation plant built. The company's coal output in 1871 was 25.825 tons and its highest output was in 1907 at 419.471 tons. In 1920 it was 267.848 tons.

In about 1888 miners employed by the Tyldesley Coal Company exceeded the boundaries of the lease and extracted coal south of Well Street which was discovered when colliers of neighbouring Astley and Tyldesley Collieries broke through and found the coal gone. Lengthy litigation followed resulting in a £3,000 fine for Green's company.

The colliery's railway expanded at the same time as the pits were developed. The line to Combermere Colliery was extended to Peelwood Colliery, which opened in 1882 next to the Lancashire and Yorkshire Railway's Manchester to Southport line and where the company had a siding. A fault caused the company to sink another shaft, the Daisy Pit, to win coal from seams close to the surface.

In 1896 Cleworth Hall employed 304 men underground and 46 surface workers. Gas coal, household and manufacturing coal was mined from the Black and White, Six-Foot and Trencherbone, mines. (Note: In this part of Lancashire a coal seam is referred to as a mine and the coal mine as a colliery or pit.)The Yew Tree Colliery was smaller with 118 below ground and 23 above. Steam, household and manufacturing coal were mined from the Seven Foot mine. In 1923 only Cleworth Hall and Peelwood, which together employed over 1,400 workers, were operating. Peelwood closed in 1928. In 1933 Cleworth Hall mined the Trencherbone, Haigh Yard, Cannel, Three Feet, Four Feet and Arley coal seams and employed over 900 workers.

The company remained independent until it became part of the National Coal Board's (NCB) North Western Division on nationalisation in January 1947 when 760 men were employed underground and 258 on the surface. In 1961 the area became the NCB's East Lancashire Area. The area mined by this company, Shakerley Collieries and James Roscoe's New Lester Colliery was opencasted after the Second World War, removing all traces of the industry.

== Disaster ==
The worst mining disaster in Tyldesley occurred at Yew Tree Colliery on 11 December 1858. An explosion of firedamp caused by a safety lamp cost 25 lives, the youngest 11 and the oldest 35 years of age. Some of the victims are buried in the churchyard at St George's Church.

== Locomotives ==
The locomotives owned by the Tyldesley Coal Company had to pass under the Manchester Road bridge which had restricted headroom and were built to a reduced loading gauge. Its first locomotive was a 4-coupled saddle tank locomotive from the Haigh Foundry in Wigan. It was delivered in 1867 and named Tyldesley. Beatrice, another 4-coupled saddle tank, was bought from Vulcan Foundry in Newton le Willows in 1877, the same year that Jessie was delivered from Walker Brothers in Wigan. In 1897 Victoria, another 4-coupled locomotive, was bought from the Vulcan Foundry and the first 6-coupled engine, Louisa, was built by the Hunslet Engine Company in Leeds in 1902.

== See also ==
- List of Collieries in Astley and Tyldesley
