= Nelson Pit =

Former Coal Mine in Greater Manchester

Coordinates: 53.5223°N 2.4643°W

Nelson Pit was a coal mine operating on the Manchester Coalfield from the 1830s or 1840s in Shakerley, Tyldesley, Greater Manchester, then in the historic county of Lancashire, England.

Originally named Shakerley Colliery, the pit was sunk on land leased from Ellis Fletcher and worked by Nathan Eckersley in 1851. In 1861 the colliery passed to William Ramsden who owned Messhing Trees Colliery half a mile to the south. A shaft was sunk to 840 feet and the pit produced house coal from the Trencherbone mine. The colliery was renamed after 1880. The shaft was deepened to the Arley mine at 1486 feet. Nelson Pit closed in 1938. Shakerley Colliery and Messhing Trees were owned by William Ramsden's Shakerley Collieries.

The colliery was isolated from the main roads and railway and access to it was via a toll road, Shakerley Lane, connecting it to the Bolton to Leigh turnpike which continued to charge tolls until 1948. After the opening of the Tyldesley Loopline in 1864, William Ramsden built a mineral railway to link his collieries to the main line east of the Tyldesley Coal Company's sidings.

The colliery was the scene of a disaster on 2 October 1883; six men died when the cage rope broke.

The colliery was sold to Manchester Collieries in 1935 and abandoned in October 1938.

== See also ==
- List of collieries in Astley and Tyldesley
- List of mining disasters in Lancashire
- Glossary of coal mining terminology
