= List of collieries in Astley and Tyldesley =

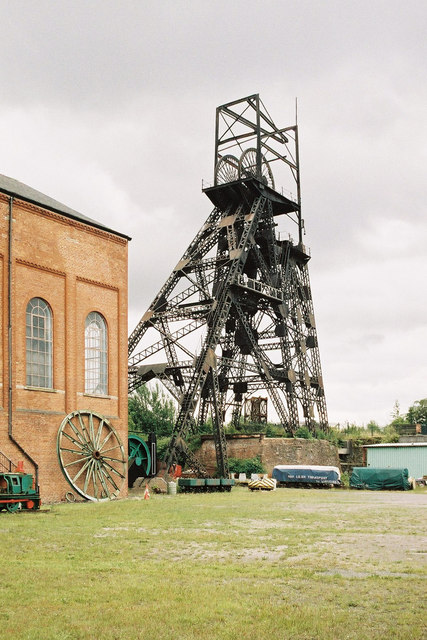
Astley Green Colliery headgear

Astley and Tyldesley are situated on the Manchester Coalfield, historically in Lancashire, now in Greater Manchester, England.

== Geology ==
The underlying geology of Astley and Tyldesley comprises the sandstones, shales and coal seams of the Middle Coal Measures laid down during the Carboniferous period more than 300 million years ago and which outcrop from Shakerley to New Manchester where coal was mined from seams between the Worsley Four Foot and Arley mines. (Note: In this part of Lancashire a coal seam is referred to as a mine and the coal mine as a colliery or pit.) The seams generally dip towards the south and west and are affected by small faults. The Upper Coal Measures are not worked in this part of the coalfield. To the south of Astley the Coal Measures dip beneath the Permo-Triassic New Red Sandstone.

== History ==
Coal was got in Tyldesley in 1429 when a dispute over "seacole" was recorded. It was used in the smithies of the Shakerley nailers. Some of the earliest small coal pits belonged to Francis Egerton, 3rd Duke of Bridgewater, and his successors the Bridgewater Trustees, and were situated at the east of the township near Chaddock Lane, and north at New Manchester where the coal seams outcropped. Other colliery companies operating in the area included Tyldesley Coal Company whose pits were north of Manchester Road as were those of the Shakerley Collieries. Astley and Tyldesley Collieries had coal mines at Gin Pit to the south of the railway. The last pit to open was Astley Green Colliery by the Bridgewater Canal in Astley Green.

Some of these companies joined with others to form Manchester Collieries in 1929 as a response to the decline in coal mining and better survive the difficult economic conditions of the time. Several collieries survived until after nationalisation in 1947. The last colliery to close was Astley Green in 1970.

== Collieries ==
| Colliery | Locality | Owner | Notes | Refs |
|---|---|---|---|---|
| Astley Green Colliery; 53.495°N 2.447°W | Astley Green | Clifton and Kersley Coal Company | Astley Green Colliery was sunk by a subsidiary of the Clifton and Kersley Coal Company immediately to the north of the Bridgewater Canal to exploit the deep coal seams under Chat Moss where the exposed coalfield dips under the Permian strata. Shaft sinking started in 1908 and the pit opened in 1912. The colliery was absorbed into Manchester Collieries in 1929 and nationalised in 1947. The pit closed in 1970 and is now the site of Astley Green Colliery Museum. | |
| Chaddock Pit; 53.502°N 2.428°W | Tyldesley, south of Chaddock Lane | Bridgewater Trustees | Chaddock Pit had two shafts, an engine pit for pumping and a winding shaft. It was sunk around 1820 and was operating in 1837 when it was the biggest coal mine in the Tyldesley township. It was connected to the Bridgewater Canal at Boothstown basin by an underground level. In 1840 the Chaddock Pits employed 54 colliers, 55 boys, 35 girls and 19 boatmen. The mines worked from the Chaddock Level were closed by 1842. The extent of the navigable level in the Chaddock Pit was 814 yards to the west and 1,178 yards to the east in the four Foot mine. | |
| Cleworth Hall Colliery; 53.5169°N 2.4532°W | Tyldesley, north of Manchester Road | Tyldesley Coal Company | The two original shafts at Cleworth Hall were sunk in 1874. The Crombouke mine was reached at 71 yards, the Rams mine at 115 yards and the Black and White at 220 yards. As reserves from these seams were worked out, a third shaft was sunk to the Trencherbone mine accessing several other seams. At the bottom of No.2 shaft was a furnace, this was the upcast ventilation shaft for the pit. The colliery was owned by the Tyldesley Coal Company until it was nationalised in 1947. | |
| Combermere Colliery; 53.524°N 2.453°W | Tyldesley, Combermere Lane | Tyldesley Coal Company | Combermere Colliery had two shafts to the Rams and Black and White mines. Coal production ceased in 1893 but the pit continued to produce fireclay to supply brickworks that were built on the site. | |
| Cross Hillock Pit; 53.499°N 2.460°W | Astley | Astley and Tyldesley Collieries | Cross Hillock Pit was sunk by Astley and Tyldesley Collieries south-east of the junction of Manchester Road and Higher Green Lane. It was liable to flooding and closed by 1887. | |
| Ellenbrook | New Manchester | Bridgewater Trustees | The Ellenbrook Pit had two shafts for winding coal from the Worsley Four Foot mine and was operational by 1870. | |
| Gatley | New Manchester | Thomas Fletcher. | Gatley Pit's two shafts were sunk to the Worsley Four Foot mine between 1840 and 1850. | |
| Gin Pit Colliery; 53.5034°N 2.4695°W | Tyldesley, Gin Pit | Astley and Tyldesley Salt Company | The modern colliery was sunk in 1866 in an area where coal had previously been mined. Gin Pit worked the Crombouke and Six Foot mines. When they were worked out the Brassey mine was developed. The colliery closed in 1958. | |
| Great Boys Colliery | Tyldesley, north of Sale Lane | William Atkin 1854, Thomas Fletcher and Sons | Great Boys colliery was situated on the north side of Sale Lane in Tyldesley west of the Colliers Arms public house. It was begun by William Atkin and sold in 1855 to John Fletcher and Samuel Scowcroft. The company had become John Fletcher and Sons in 1877. Shafts were sunk on Pear Tree Farm, near Mort Lane and these became part of Great Boys Colliery which closed before 1885. The colliery accessed the Brassey mine at about 170 yards and the Six Feet mine at 182 yards. | |
| Henfold Pit, west of Chaddock Lane | Tyldesley | Bridgewater Trustees | The Henfold Pit under the Chaddock Hall estate was sunk to the Worsley Four Foot mine around 1820 and was connected by an underground level to the Chaddock Pit and the Worsley Navigable Levels at Ingles Pit in Worsley. A tunnel eastwards connected it to the Queen Anne Pit near Chaddock Lane. The mines worked from the Chaddock Level were closed by 1842. The extent the branch of the navigable level at the pit was 1,914 yards. | |
| Mosley Common Colliery; 53.508°N 2.417°W | Mosley Common | Bridgewater Trustees | In 1862 work began at Mosley Common to access the deeper seams earlier mining had not reached. Five shafts were sunk. In 1923 the Mosley Common, Nos 1, 2 and 5 pits employed 1,338 underground and 198 surface workers while Nos 3 and 4 pits employed 951 underground and 143 above ground. Mosley Common was one of the country's largest and most modern pits after refurbishment and development work in the 1960s when it employed 3000 workers. The colliery closed in 1968 though its coal reserves had not been exhausted. The site was cleared by 1974. | |
| Nelson Pit originally Shakerley Colliery (Ramsdens); 53.522°N 2.465°W | Shakerley, east of Lancaster Avenue | Shakerley Collieries | Shakerley Colliery was sunk in the late 1830s north of Shakerley Hall on land owned by Ellis Fletcher. It was renamed Nelson Pit in the early 1880s. The colliery was sold to Manchester Collieries in 1935 and closed in 1938. | |
| New Lester Colliery; 53.519°N 2.436°W | Tyldesley, Mort Lane | James Roscoe | New Lester Colliery was owned by James Roscoe and two shafts were sunk in about 1865 on the east side of Mort Lane. James Roscoe and Sons was formed in 1892 and operated until 1938 when Peel Collieries took ove. New Lester shafts accessed the Arley mine (seam), the Yard mine, the Four foot, Cannel, Plodder and Three Quarters mines. In 1939 the colliery employed 499 men underground and 169 surface workers. The colliery was closed by 1947. | |
| Nook Colliery; 53.5073°N 2.4694°W | Tyldesley, Gin Pit | Astley and Tyldesley Coal and Salt Company | Nook's first shaft was sunk to the Rams mine in 1866 by the Astley and Tyldesley Coal and Salt Company. The colliery expanded and eventually had five shafts and became one of the largest pits on the coalfield. No.2 upcast shaft was sunk in 1873 and deepened to the Arley mine. No.3 shaft was sunk the Trencherbone mine through water bearing rock in 1899. No.4 shaft, sunk in 1913, intersected every workable coal seam. The colliery became part of Manchester Collieries in 1929 and the National Coal Board in 1947. | |
| Pear Tree | Tyldesley | Tyldesley Coal Company | Shafts were sunk on Pear Tree Farm, near Mort Lane and these became part of Great Boys Colliery which closed before 1885. | |
| Peel | Tyldesley, accessed from Little Hulton | Thomas Grundy | Thomas Grundy sank Peel Colliery in the north of the township near the border with Little Hulton. | |
| Peelwood Colliery; 53.5272°N 2.4646°W | Tyldesley, off Engine Lane, Shakerley | Tyldesley Coal Company | Peelwood began producing coal in 1883. The colliery had two shafts accessing the Trencherbone and Seven Feet mines. | |
| Queen Anne Pit | Tyldesley Chaddock Lane | Bridgewater Trustees | The Queen Anne Pit was sunk by 1820 to the Worsley Four Foot mine. It was connected by underground levels to Chaddock Pit and Ingles Pit. A tunnel linked the pit with Henfold Pit to the west. The mines worked from the Chaddock Level were closed by 1842. The extent of the navigable levels was 902 yards to the west and 506 yards to the east. | |
| Shakerley Colliery (Greens) | Shakerley Common | Tyldesley Coal Company | The first Shakerley Colliery was sunk in 1867 and operating in 1878. The colliery on Shakerley Common had a single shaft which was sunk to the Rams mine at 300 feet by George Green. It became part of the Tyldesley Coal Company in 1870. It had the first iron headgear in the country but closed by 1886. | |
| St George's Colliery (Back o't' Church); 53.5119°N 2.4726°W | Tyldesley, south of railway line | Astley and Tyldesley Coal and Salt Company | St George's Colliery, Back o't' Church, opened in 1866 south of Tyldesley Station. Its two shafts were sunk by Astley and Tyldesley Coal and Salt Company to the Rams mine. It was linked to Gin Pit Colliery for ventilation. A third shaft to the Trencherbone mine was sunk in 1884 and was deepened to the Arley mine. The colliery worked the Seven Foot mine until 1929 when it became part of Manchester Collieries and ceased coal production in 1941 but was retained for ventilation until 1964. | |
| Wellington Colliery originally Messhing Trees | Tyldesley | William Ramsden | Wellington Pit, originally named Messhing Trees, was sunk by William Ramsden and became part of Ramsden's Shakerley Collieries. The colliery worked the Trencherbone mine at 360 yards and was ventilated by furnace in 1895. Coal to make gas and household coal was produced in 1896 from the Arley, Hell hole, Trencherbone and Yard mines. The colliery lasted until 1935 when the company was taken over by Manchester Collieries and closed. | |
| Yew Tree Colliery | Tyldesley, north of Manchester Road | Tyldesley Coal Company | Yew Tree Colliery dates from around 1850 but sinking started several years earlier. It was situated north of Manchester Road and had two shafts sunk to the Six Feet mine and deepened to the Seven feet. Yew Tree closed in 1910. | |

== See also ==
- List of Collieries in Astley and Tyldesley
- Glossary of coal mining terminology
- List of mining disasters in Lancashire
