= Shakerley Collieries =

English coal mining company

Ramsden's Shakerley Collieries was a coal mining company operating the Nelson and Wellington Pits from the mid 19th century in Shakerley, Tyldesley in the historic county of Lancashire, England.

== History ==
Coal had been dug in Shakerley since the 15th century when a dispute over "seacole" was recorded in 1429. Coal was used in the smithies of the nailers who plied their trade in Shakerley. There was a colliery between Higher Oak and Common Fold in Shakerley in 1798. John Hope of Chaddock Hall left it to his son, John, and his son-in-law, Thomas Smith. In 1836 Jacob Fletcher of Peel Hall Little Hulton bought the Shakerley estates and acquired "514 acres of land, and the valuable mines of coal and stone lying under the same; the estates abounded with thriving young timber; the mines of coal were inexhaustible, of excellent quality, and being in a manufacturing district found a ready sale".

Shakerley Colliery, which was later renamed the Nelson Pit was sunk in the 1830s or 1840s on land leased from Ellis Fletcher on the Manchester Coalfield in Shakerley. It was worked by Nathan Eckersley and in 1861 passed to his nephew William Ramsden who owned the nearby Messhing Trees Colliery which is named on the 1869 mines list. Some time after 1880 Messhing Trees was renamed the Wellington Pit. The Nelson Pit relied on road transport and a cobblestone toll road was built linking it to the Bolton to Leigh turnpike road near Green Hall, Atherton north of Shakerley. Shakerley Lane remained a toll road until 1949 but is now a bridleway. In 1869 when Ramsden was sinking a shaft at the Nelson Pit he got into financial difficulties and disappeared after setting out to go the bank at Bolton. Ramsden's wife had to keep the collieries working and pay wages and had to approach George Green of Yew Tree Colliery for help. Ramsden returned some weeks later arriving at one of his collieries having walked from Liverpool after returning from Ireland.

In 1896 the Shakerley Collieries employed 442 underground workers and 87 surface workers in their pits. In 1933 the company employed 330 underground and 115 workers who produced 90,000 tons of coal annually from the Plodder, Cannel, Arley, Smith and Yard mines. Ramsden's Collieries joined Manchester Collieries in 1935. The Wellington Pit was abandoned in the same year and the Nelson Pit closed in 1938.

== Disasters ==
Disasters at the Shakerley pits included the death of six men when the cage rope broke at the Nelson Pit on 2 October 1883. Then on 1 October 1895 five men including the colliery manager and undermanager died at the Wellington Pit after an explosion of firedamp possibly caused by a safety lamp.

== Locomotives ==
After the London and North Western Railway built the Tyldesley Loopline in 1864, Ramsden built a colliery railway to join the mainline railway at Ramsden's Sidings east of Tyldesley Station and Tyldesley Coal Company's Green's Sidings. In 1874 an 0-4-0ST locomotive Shakerley was bought from Manning Wardle and in 1887 Edith an 0-6-0T locomotive was bought from Hunslets. Shakerley was sold in 1901 and replaced by a new locomotive from Hunslets, identical to Edith which was also named Shakerley.

== See also ==
- List of mining disasters in Lancashire

== See also ==
- List of Collieries in Astley and Tyldesley
