= Chaddock Hall =

Ancient hall in Greater Manchester, England

Coordinates: 53.505°N 2.436°W

Chaddock Hall was an ancient hall on Chaddock Lane in Tyldesley, Greater Manchester, England. It was designated a Grade II listed building in 1966. It was gutted in an arson attack in 2014 but was later rebuilt by Redwaters.

== History ==
In the Middle Ages Chaddock was a hamlet, its hall surrounded by a few houses at the eastern extremity of Tyldesley. Its name was recorded as Chaidok in 1332 and Cheidocke in 1586, the last component most probably means oak. A family of yeoman farmers with the same name occupied the estate for many centuries.

Henry and Adam were recorded in 1332 and Thomas de Chaydok a free tenant, in 1350. In the 12th and 13th centuries, the Chaddocks, like their neighbours, had a reputation for lawlessness. Archers from Chaddock fought at Crécy in 1346 and at the Battle of Agincourt in 1415. In 1360, William Chaddock was described as an archer on foot, "potens de corpore et bonis". (Note: fit for active service in body and equipment) Hugh Chaddock was a foot-archer drawing daily pay for service from 22 July to 21 October 1391. In 1547, the sons of Hugh Chaddock were summoned for stealing Sir Robert Worsley's tame red deer. Thomas Chaddock graduated from Brasenose College, Oxford in 1692 and was vicar of Eccles in 1721. His only daughter Grace and her husband James Markland sold the estate to Samuel Clowes of Manchester.

In 1782, the Duke of Bridgewater leased land at Chaddock and it was subsequently bought by Robert Haldane Bradshaw for the Bridgewater estates in 1810. The estate then covered 50 Cheshire acres, included were a pew at Leigh Parish Church, two at Astley Chapel and a smithy at Stirrup Brook. Chaddock Pit on the estate was the largest coal mine in Tyldesley in the 1830s, it was probably sunk in the 18th century. The hall is owned by Peel Group. The derelict hall was gutted by fire in a suspected arson attack in December 2014 but was restored by Redwaters following guidance from Historic England.

== Architecture ==
Chaddock Hall was a brick and timber-framed hall that has been rendered. It is of two-storeys on a T-shaped plan with an 18th-century range under a slate roof. A datestone at the rear is inscribed "T.C. 1698" (Thomas Chaydock) and a lead rainwater-head is dated "S.C. 1780".
