= New Manchester (disambiguation) =

New Manchester may refer to:

- New Manchester, a community in England
- New Manchester, West Virginia, a community in the United States
- New Manchester, a former community in the U.S. state of Georgia that is now part of Sweetwater Creek State Park
