= Wellington Pit =

Coordinates: 53.5171°N 2.4601°W

Wellington Colliery was a coal mine operating on the Manchester Coalfield before 1869 in Tyldesley, Greater Manchester, then in the historic county of Lancashire, England.

Originally named Messhing Trees, the colliery was sunk by William Ramsden and, with Nelson Pit, formed Ramsden's Shakerley Collieries. The colliery worked the Trencherbone mine at 360 yards and was ventilated by furnace in 1895. Coal to make gas and household coal was produced in 1896 from the Arley, Hell hole, Trencherbone and Yard mines. Shakerley Collieries' combined workforce for the two pits was 422 underground and 87 surface workers.

The colliery lasted until 1935 when the company was taken over by Manchester Collieries and closed the same year.

== See also ==
- List of Collieries in Astley and Tyldesley
- Glossary of coal mining terminology
