= Astley Green Colliery =

Coal mine in Greater Manchester, England

Coordinates: 53.495°N 2.447°W

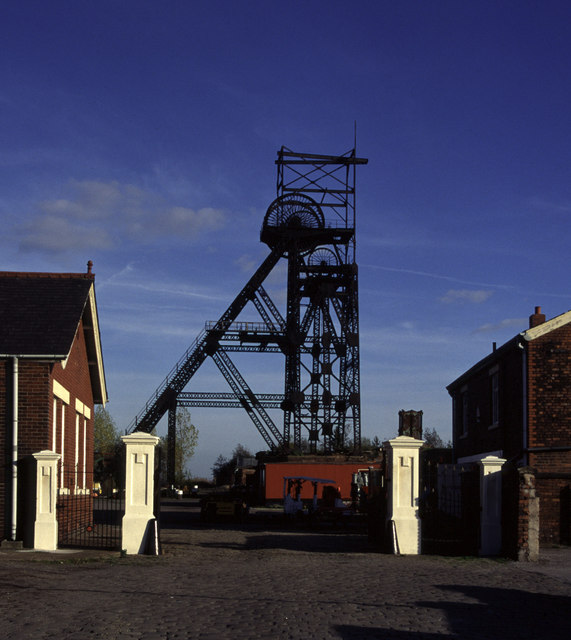
Astley Green Colliery

Astley Green Colliery was a coal mine in Astley, Greater Manchester, then in the historic county of Lancashire, England. It was the last colliery to be sunk in Astley. Sinking commenced in 1908 by the Pilkington Colliery Company, a subsidiary of the Clifton and Kersley Coal Company, at the southern edge of the Manchester Coalfield, working the Middle Coal Measures where they dipped under the Permian age rocks under Chat Moss. The colliery was north of the Bridgewater Canal. In 1929 it became part of Manchester Collieries, and in 1947 was nationalised and integrated into the National Coal Board. It closed in 1970, and is now Astley Green Colliery Museum.

== Geology ==
Astley Green is the southernmost colliery on the Manchester Coalfield. It accessed the coal seams of the Middle Coal Measures laid down over 300 million years ago in the Carboniferous Period and overlain by Permo-Triassic rocks. A 100-foot (30 m) layer of alluvial deposits consisting of clay, sand, gravel and marl overlay the rock. The coal seams dipped at 1 to 4.5 towards the south. The Worsley Four Foot mine was reached at a depth of 722 feet (220 m) and the Arley mine at 3360 feet (1020 m). (Note: In this part of Lancashire a coal seam is referred to as a mine and the coal mine as a colliery or pit.)

== History ==
The Clifton and Kearsley Company's coal reserves were becoming depleted in the Irwell Valley at a time when demand for coal on the Lancashire Coalfield was at its highest and in 1907 its subsidiary company sank a 24-inch (610 mm) bore hole at Astley Green, north of the Bridgewater Canal to investigate untapped reserves of the concealed coalfield. The company acquired the mineral rights for 700 acres (280 ha) of land accessing an estimated 140 million tons of coal under Chat Moss stretching beyond the Liverpool and Manchester Railway and where the coal seams dip at 1 in 4.5 towards the south. Shaft sinking commenced in 1908 and proved difficult because of water and quicksand. The company contracted Haniel and Lueg of Düsseldorf-Düsseltal to sink the shaft. The Worsley Four Foot mine was reached in April 1910 and more water-bearing rock was anticipated before the Arley mine was reached. No 1 pit was sunk to 890 yards primarily to win coal from the Trencherbone mine and No 2 pit was 833 yards deep. The shaft was 23 feet in diameter. The Crombouke and Rams mines were intersected by the sinkings. Firedamp was a problem in the new workings and ventilation was a problem. The headgear of No.1 pit survives, it is made from wrought iron lattice girders with riveted plates at the joints and one small and two large wheels mounted at the top. It is nearly 30 metres (98 ft) high and was built by Head Wrightson of Stockton-on-Tees and completed by 1912. In 1912 a twin tandem compound 3300 horsepower winding engine built by Yates and Thom of Blackburn, the largest ever used on the Lancashire Coalfield, was installed at No 1 pit. The company built a smaller cross compound winding engine for No 2 pit, installed in 1919.

In 1923 the colliery employed 1524 men underground and 436 surface workers; which increased to 1631 underground and 492 surface workers by 1933. At Nationalisation in 1947 the colliery employed 1375 below and 561 above ground. The surface workers included women, known as pit brow lasses, who sorted coal on the screens. Women were employed at Astley Green until the mid-1950s.

== Transport ==
By about 1851, George Green had built a horse-drawn tramway linking Yew Tree Colliery to the Bridgewater Canal east of Astley Green. The tramway was out of use by 1913, when its sidings and tipping plant were sold to the Clifton and Kersley Coal Company to be used by the new colliery. A mineral line and exchange sidings to connect with the Liverpool and Manchester Railway east of Astley Station a mile and a half to the south was built across Chat Moss using similar construction methods to the earlier railway, tree trunks and branches overlain with pit waste, to provide a foundation for the rails. An 0-4-0 saddletank, "Astley", from Pecketts of Bristol was bought in 1908 and used on the construction of the line as was "Winnie", a contractor's 0-4-0 tank engine hired from Thomas Mitchell and Sons of Bury. When production began in 1912, 0-4-0 locomotive "Outwood" was transferred from the company's Outwood Colliery and in 1914 an 0-6-0 saddletank "Astley Green", built in 1880, was bought from a Darlington firm. A new locomotive, "Edward", a six-coupled saddletank was bought from Hawthorn Leslie in 1916. "Black Diamond" and "Newtown" were transferred from other Clifton and Kersley pits in the 1920s. After 1929 the Astley Green was on Manchester Collieries' Central Railway system based on Walkden Yard.

A narrow gauge railway has been created at the site of Astley Pit Museum and is one of the attractions for visitors.

== Incident ==
There was a mining accident at the colliery on 6 June 1939, when there was an explosion of firedamp. Men had been fighting an underground fire over a mile from the pit bottom. Despite the efforts of the mines rescue teams from Boothstown Mines Rescue Station, who were driven back by further explosions, five men including the manager died.

== See also ==
- List of collieries in Astley and Tyldesley
- Glossary of coal mining terminology
