= Tyldesley Loopline =

The Tyldesley Loopline was part of the London and North Western Railway's Manchester and Wigan Railway line from Eccles to the junction west of Tyldesley station and its continuance south west via Bedford Leigh to Kenyon Junction on the Liverpool and Manchester Railway. The line opened on 1 September 1864 with stations at Worsley, Ellenbrook, Tyldesley, Leigh and Pennington before joining the Liverpool and Manchester Railway at Kenyon Junction.

== Construction ==
The London and North Western Railway Bill received royal assent in July 1861 and the first sod was cut at Worsley by the Earl of Ellesmere in the September. During construction, a Roman road was uncovered at Worsley. The railway was just over 16 miles long with 88 bridges, a sandstone cutting at Parr Brow, Tyldesley and a 22-arch viaduct which took the railway through Leigh and over the Bridgewater Canal. The work was expected to have been completed by May 1863 but lasted until the summer of 1864.

== Development ==
Stations between Tyldesley and Wigan at Chowbent, Hindley Green and Platt Bridge opened on the same day. A branch line leaving the Tyldesley to Eccles line at Roe Green Junction with stations at Walkden, Little Hulton and Plodder Lane was authorised in 1865 and opened in 1870. The line was extended to Great Moor Street in Bolton in 1874. Monton Green station between Eccles station and Worsley station opened in 1877 to serve new housing. In 1876 Bedford Leigh was renamed Leigh & Bedford and in 1914 was again renamed to Leigh. Chowbent was renamed Howe Bridge in 1901.

Stations on the line became part of the London Midland and Scottish Railway in 1923, and the London Midland Region of British Railways on nationalisation in 1948.

== Collieries ==
Coal, and the many collieries that were being developed in the area, was the chief motivation for building a railway in the area and the railway's supporters included many local colliery owners and industrialists. These included the Earl of Ellesmere owner of the Bridgewater Collieries, the Fletchers of Fletcher, Burrows and Company and millowner Caleb Wright. Collieries linked to the railway include Astley and Tyldesley Collieries' St George's, Nook and Gin Pit Collieries which were connected at Jackson's sidings, Bedford Colliery in Leigh was connected at Speakman's sidings on the Pennington branch and the Shakerley, Yew Tree and Cleworth Hall Collieries belonging to the Tyldesley Coal Company had a connection at Green's Sidings to the east of Tyldesley station and Ramsden's Shakerley Collieries had its own sidings. Mosley Common Colliery was connected at Ellenbrook and mines connected to the Bridgewater Collieries system including Sandhole Colliery joined the line between Roe Green and Worsley at Sanderson's Sidings.

== Closure ==
The Tyldesley Loopline closed following the Beeching cuts on 5 May 1969 and Leigh, Tyldesley, Monton Green and Worsley stations were closed. The former trackbed which passes through the Metropolitan Borough of Wigan area was reserved in the Unitary Development Plan in case the rail route could be reinstated. A guided bus route running along the former trackbed to Ellenbrook was proposed but was not universally popular. Salford City Council used the railway trackbed outside the Wigan boundary for recreational purposes turning it into a rail trail. The Leigh-Salford-Manchester Bus Rapid Transit opened in April 2016. Its 4.5-mile guided busway section from Leigh via Tyldesley to Ellenbrook operates along the old rail alignment. Of Transport for Greater Manchester’s (TfGM) £122m overall spending on the bus route to Manchester Central Hospitals via the city centre, £68m was spent on the guided busway track and associated infrastructure.
