= Leigh-Salford-Manchester Bus Rapid Transit =

Bus rapid transit service in Greater Manchester

Leigh-Salford-Manchester BRT
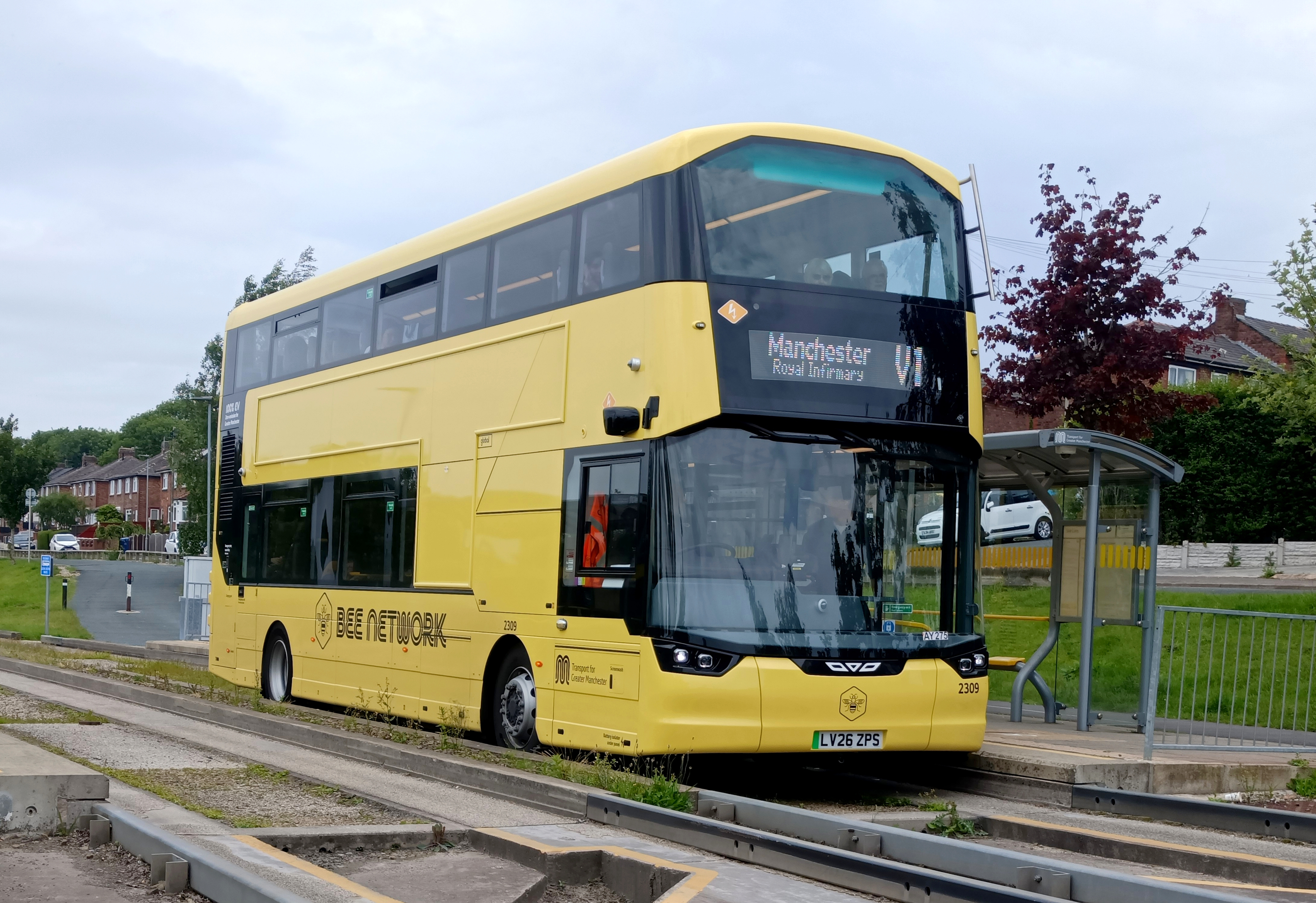
- A route V1 bus heading to Manchester Royal Infirmary at the Sale Lane stop on the guided busway section in June 2026.

Overview
- Owner: Transport for Greater Manchester
- Locale: Leigh; Atherton; Ellenbrook; Salford; Manchester
- Transit type: Guided busway and Bus rapid transit
- Annual ridership: 2.6 million (2023/24)
- Website: TfGM - V1/V2/V4 services

Operation
- Began operation: 3 April 2016
- Operator: Go North West (under the Bee Network)

Technical
- System length: 22 km (13.7 mi)

The Leigh-Salford-Manchester Bus rapid transit service in Greater Manchester, England provides transport connections between Leigh, Atherton, Tyldesley, Ellenbrook and Manchester city centre via Salford. The guided busway and bus rapid transit (BRT) scheme promoted by Transport for Greater Manchester (TfGM) opened on 3 April 2016. Built by Balfour Beatty at a total cost of £122 million to improve links from former Manchester Coalfield towns into Manchester city centre, the busway proposal encountered much opposition and a public inquiry in 2002 before construction finally started in 2013. A branch route from Atherton, and an extension to the Manchester Royal Infirmary have been added to the planned original scheme.

From Leigh, the V1 limited-stop bus service joins seven kilometres of guided busway to Ellenbrook, six kilometres of bus lanes on the East Lancashire Road and sections of reserved bus lanes through Salford and Manchester city centres. The V2 service from Atherton to Manchester joins the guided busway at Tyldesley. Stops on the guided busway section have level-boarding from platforms equipped with passenger information display screens. Both services run via the University of Manchester and Manchester Metropolitan University before terminating at Manchester Royal Infirmary.

From 24 September 2023, all services along the Bus Rapid Transit route were integrated into the first tranche of the 'Bee Network', an overall bus franchising scheme intended as a component of an eventual integrated transport network for the whole of Greater Manchester. Consequently, the Rapid Transit bus operation has been transferred to Go North West, the vehicles have been repainted with the yellow 'Bee Network' branding, and day tickets are valid for all bus journeys across the Network.

== Background ==
Leigh, one of the largest towns in Britain without a railway station after the closure of the Tyldesley Loopline in 1969, suffered from poor transport connections to neighbouring towns. A guided busway running over a kerbed concrete track was proposed, reusing the former railway trackbed from Leigh to Ellenbrook to improve access to Manchester city centre from Leigh, Tyldesley and Ellenbrook and regenerate areas of the former Manchester Coalfield.

There was considerable opposition to the proposals; variously arguing that the costs were unjustifiable, that buslane construction on the A580 East Lancashire Road would seriously disrupt traffic and that the permanent loss of a traffic lane to a buslane would reduce capacity for general traffic. In addition, rail campaign groups opposed the loss of a rail alignment to a busway.

== Route ==
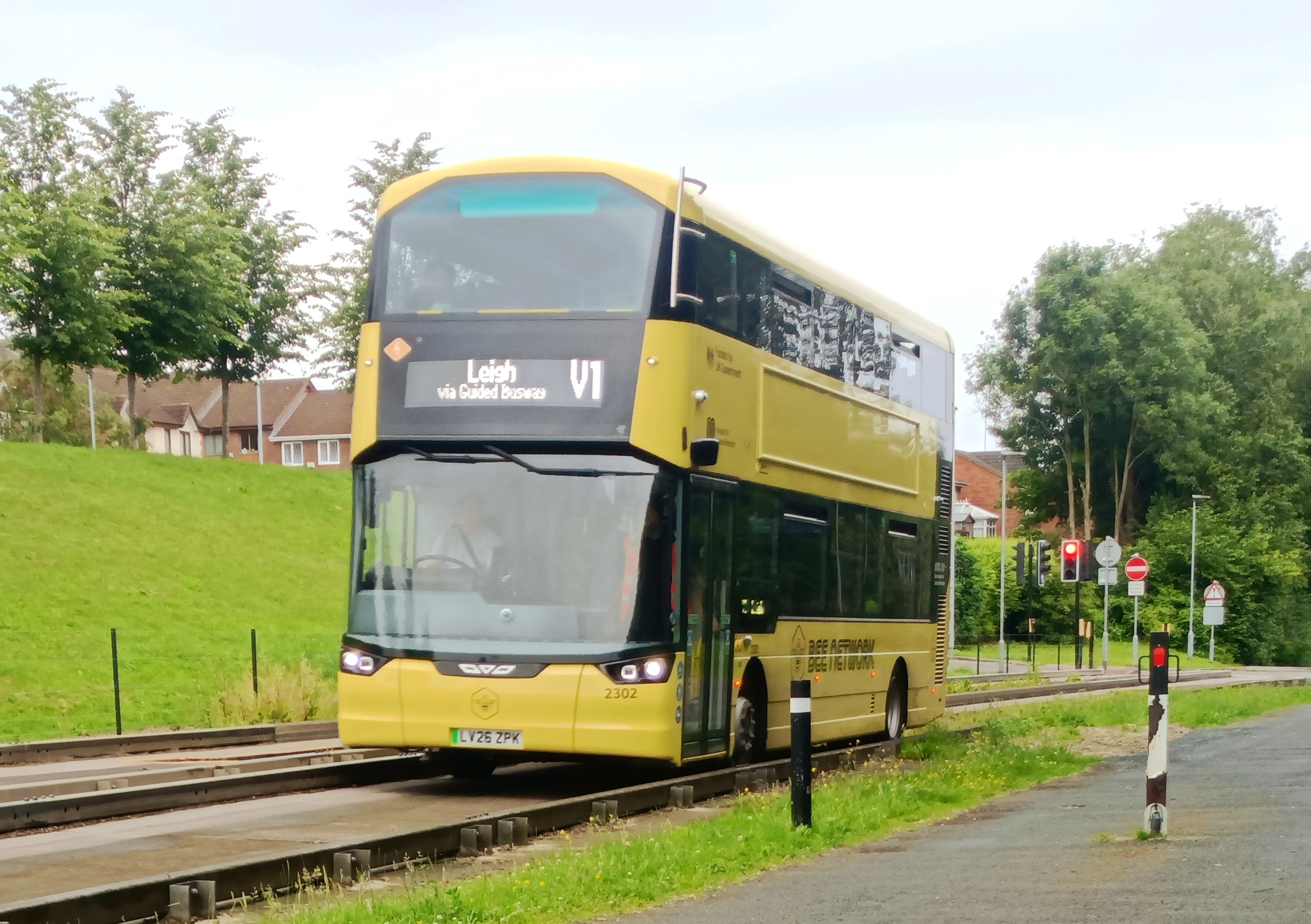
Bus on the guided busway

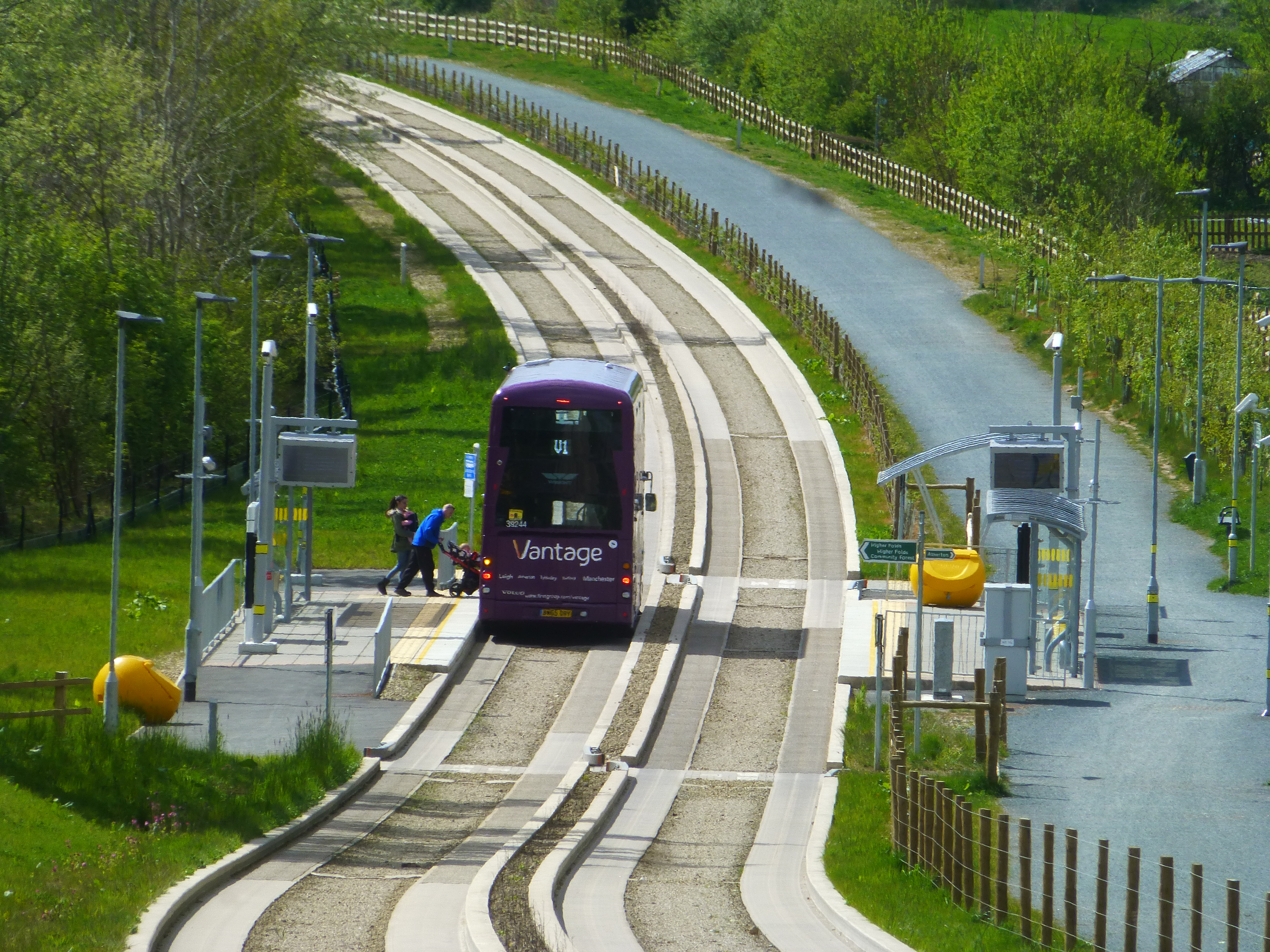
Cooling Lane stop on guided section and multi-user path

The BRT route begins at Leigh bus station, and joins the guided section at East Bond Street. It proceeds through Leigh and along the converted rail alignment via Tyldesley to Newearth Road in Ellenbrook. An improved bus route from Atherton joins the route at Astley Street, Tyldesley. From Ellenbrook the route continues via bus lanes alongside the A580 East Lancashire Road, serving Worsley and Swinton before joining the A6 at Irlams o' th' Height. All stops along the A580 bus lanes are bus bays so that conventional stopping services can be overtaken by limited-stop expresses. The service passes the University of Salford/Salford Crescent railway station and the route then runs along Chapel Street on bus lanes to Salford Central station, passing through a bus-gate before continuing through Manchester city centre and along buslanes on Oxford Road to Manchester Metropolitan University, Manchester University and the Central Manchester Hospitals.

The guided section has stops at East Bond Street, Holden Road in Leigh and Cooling Lane between Higher Folds and Squires Lane in Tyldesley, Astley Street, Hough Lane and Sale Lane in Tyldesley and Newearth Road in Ellenbrook. The multi-user path for walkers, horse riders and cyclists alongside the guided section provides access for emergency vehicles and maintenance. For cyclists the path from Tyldesley to Ellenbrook is part of the National Cycle Network Route 55.

The route from Leigh to Central Manchester Hospitals has 36 stops and the connecting route from Tyldesley to Atherton has five. Park and ride facilities are provided at East Bond Street, Astley Street and Wardley (accessed from the A580, where the road passes under the M60 motorway).

== Services ==
Service V1 operates from Leigh and V2 from Atherton; with additional V4 services from Ellenbrook in the weekday morning peak period that do not use the guided section of the route. Timetabled journey times are 60 minutes from Leigh and Atherton to Albert Square, Manchester at peak periods; 51 minutes daytime off-peak and 40 minutes in evenings, overnight and early mornings. In peak periods, the services from the Wardley, A580 Park and Ride take 31 minutes into Albert Square. In daytime operation from Monday to Saturday at least eight buses per hour run in each direction on the guided section, four on the Leigh to Tyldesley section and four from Atherton joining the Tyldesley to Ellenbrook section.

From 1 September 2024, V1 services have run round the clock and every day of the week, with night-time services at hourly frequencies. Two additional V1 services run from Leigh into Manchester in the weekday morning peak; three additional services return to Leigh in the weekday evening peak. Four V4 services run into Manchester in the morning peak, starting from Ellenbrook. More additional journeys were added to the V1 route in September 2025, up to 15 buses per hour now run between Leigh and Manchester Royal Infirmary in the weekday morning peak.

From September 2026, Transport for Greater Manchester plan on withdrawing some overnight trips on the V1 route but retaining the 24-hour service on Thursday to Saturday nights. More peak-time journeys are also planned to support housing development at Mosley Common.

=== Operation ===
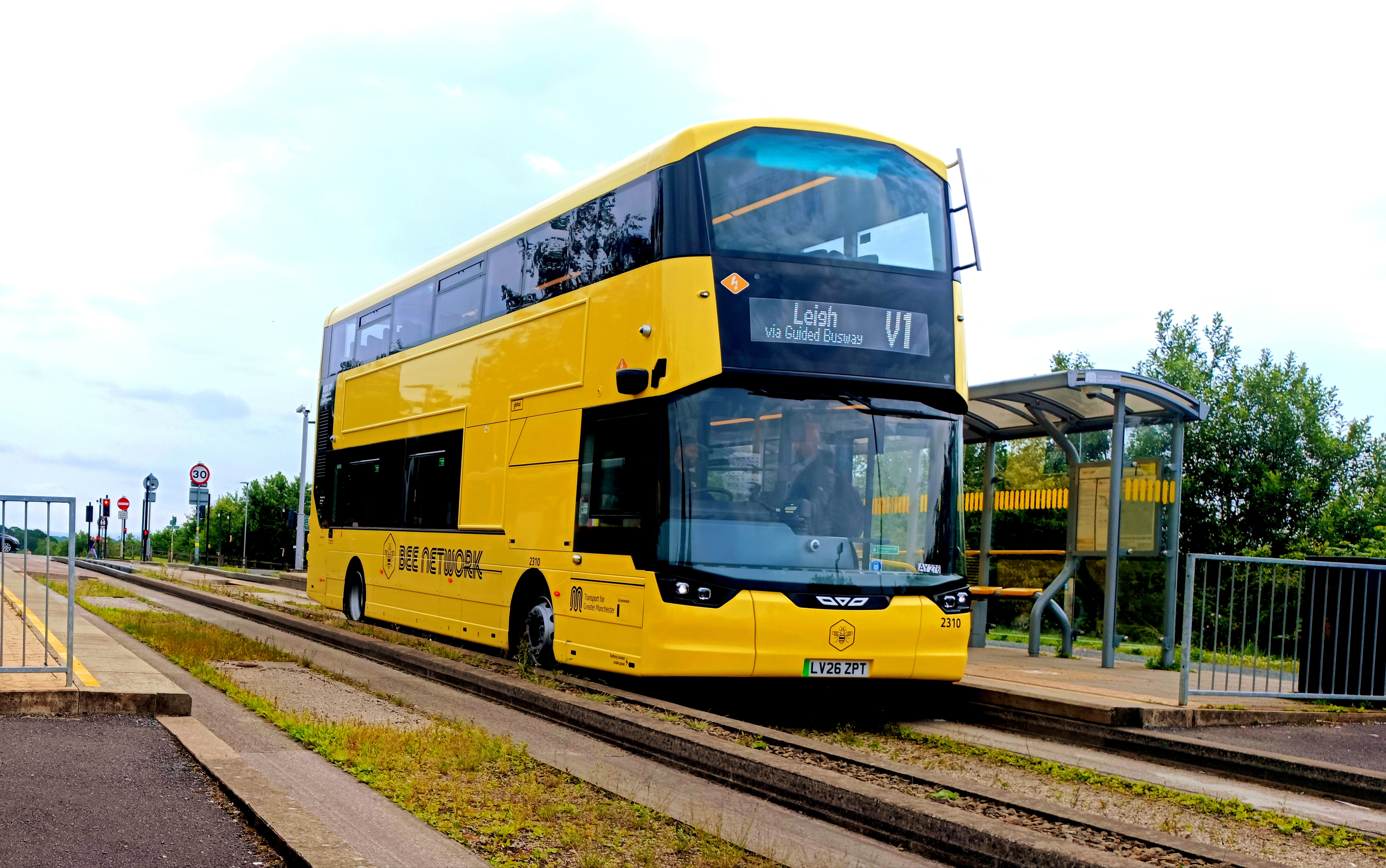
V1 bus in Bee Network branding at the Sale Lane bus stop

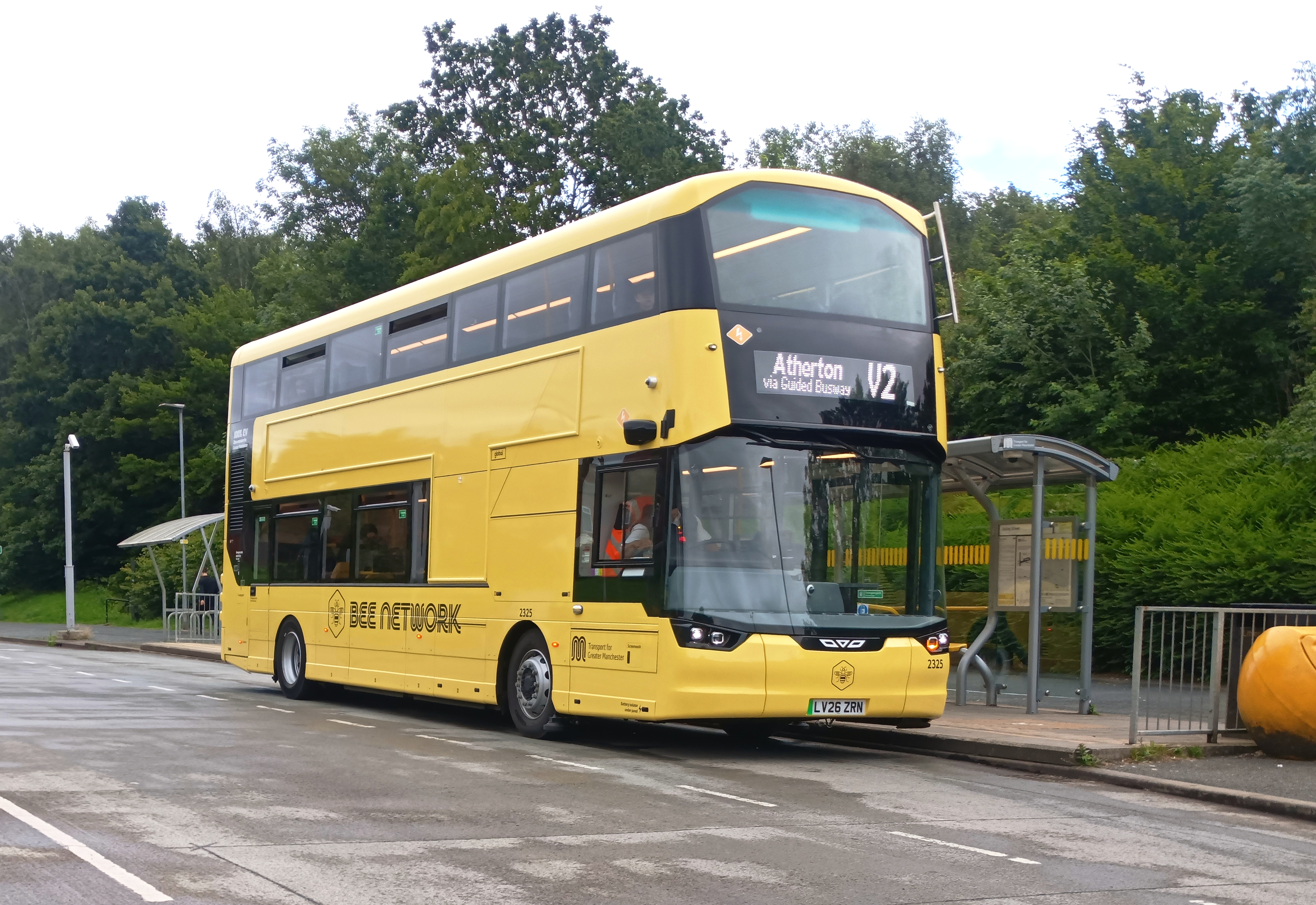
V2 bus in Bee Network branding at Asley Street bus stop

After light-controlled junctions along the East Lancashire Road were upgraded with SCOOT adaptive signalling in July 2016, TfGM reported that October that general road traffic journey times on this section had returned to pre-construction levels in the morning peak while accommodating significant additional traffic.

In the first six months of operation, more than 900,000 passenger journeys were made. A survey of users published in October 2016 revealed that 20% of passengers had switched from using their cars for the same journey, and nearly all respondents would recommend the service. More than a quarter of busway users walked or travelled more than a kilometre to reach the busway. By the third year of operation, it was being estimated that 580,000 car trips per year along the BRT route had transferred to bus ridership.

The service attracted about 28,000 passengers per week when it started in April 2016 rising to 45,000 by the autumn and 55,000 in the run up to Christmas 2016. In the first year more than 2.1 million passengers were carried; increasing to approximately 2.6 million in the second, and 3 million in the third. By December 2017, weekly ridership had increased to 62,000. This further increased to a record 71,626 weekly passengers in December 2019.

BRT services were curtailed and patronage sharply reduced in 2020 and 2021 during the COVID-19 pandemic; but have since recovered to a total annual ridership of 2.6 million in the financial year 2023/24, and continue to increase.

=== Buses ===
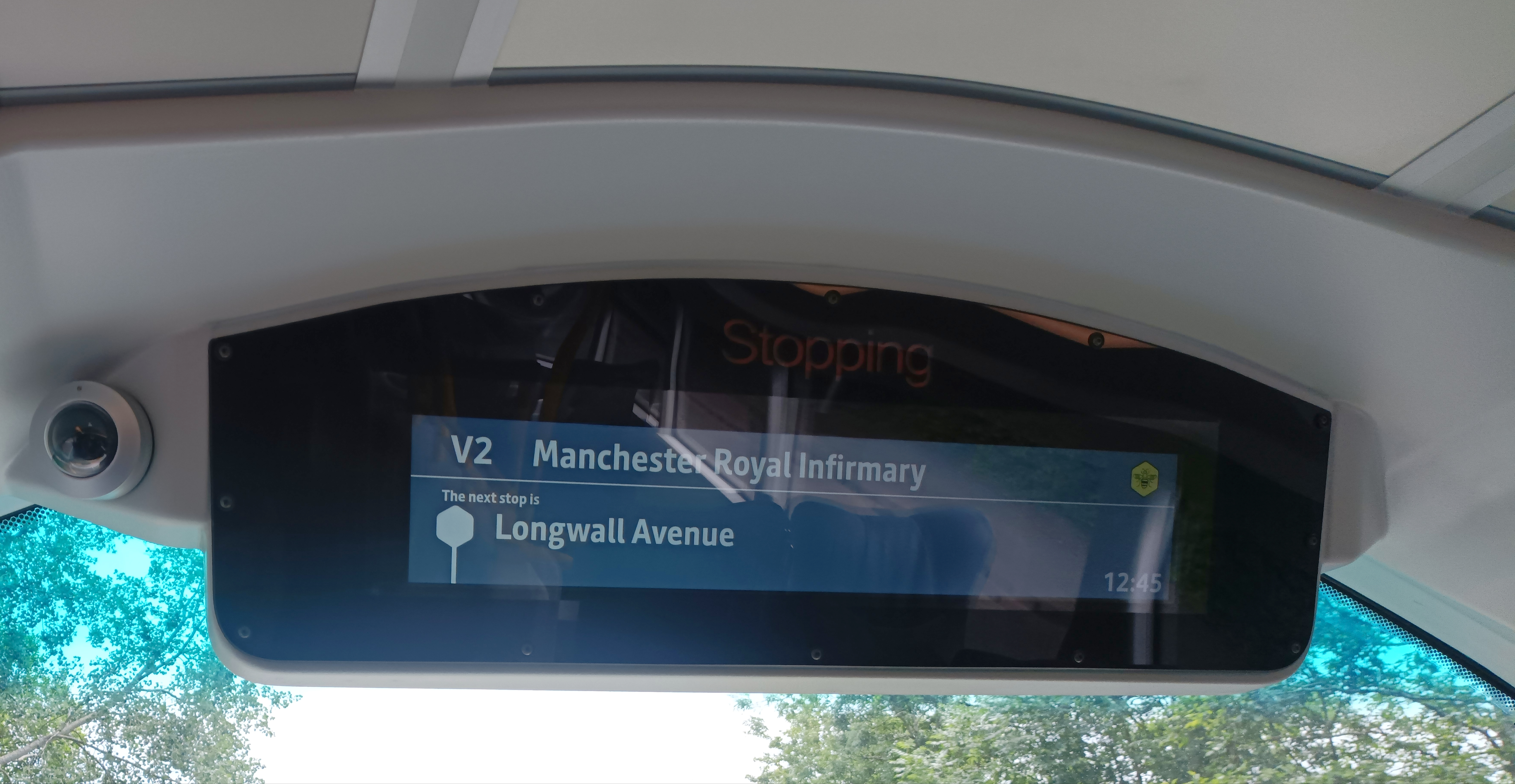
Audio-visual bus stop announcement system showing the upcoming bus stop

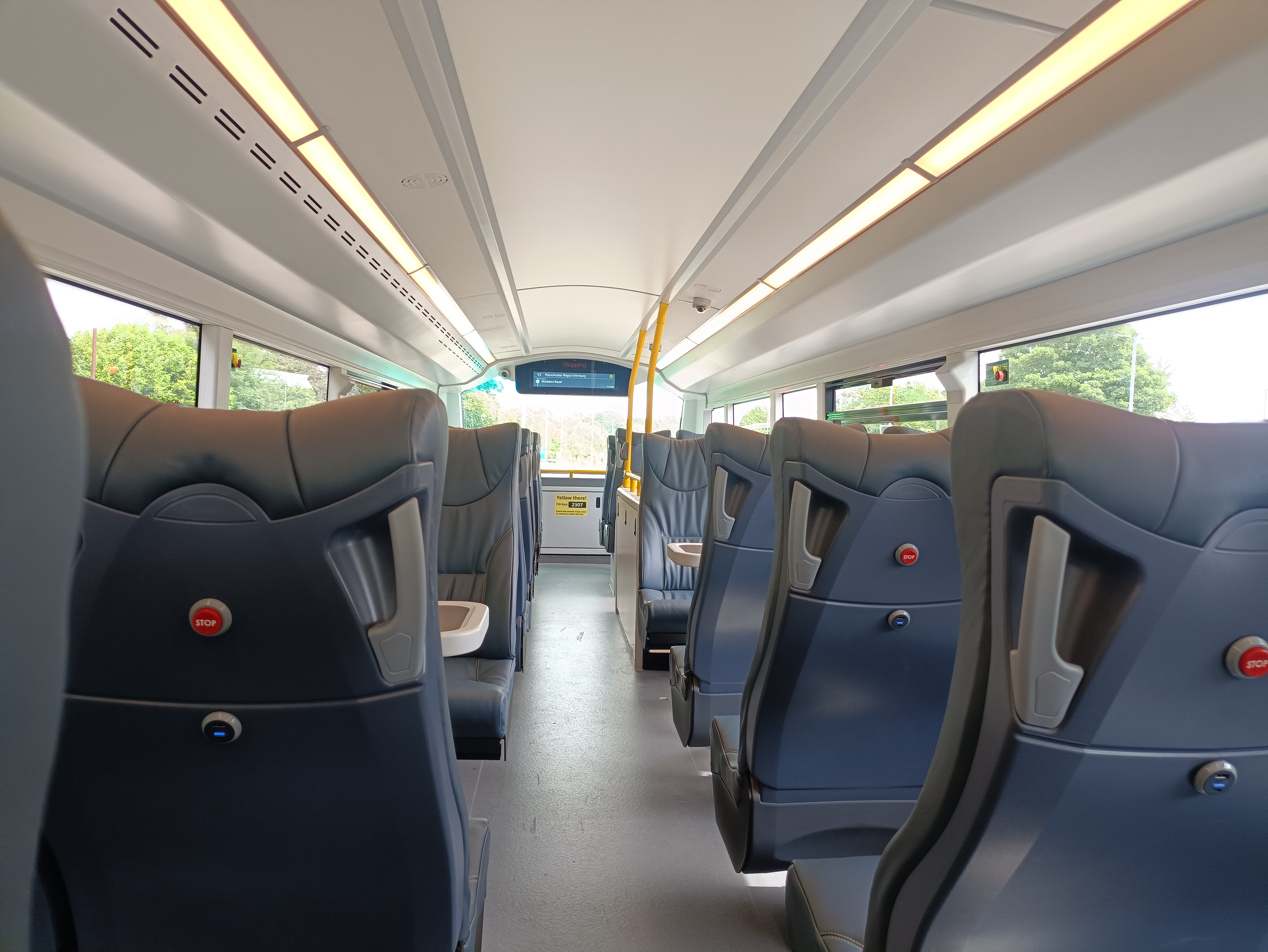
Interior of Go North West Vantage Wright StreetDeck Electroliner for guided busway routes

Services were initially operated by 20 Wright Gemini 3 bodied Volvo B5LH hybrid double-decker buses in purple-livery. These were equipped with CCTV and next stop audio and visual announcements, USB charging points and free Wi-Fi. Five more buses were purchased in January 2017 to provide extra capacity at busy times and facilitate the extended service to Central Manchester Hospitals. Further buses entered service in September 2018 to operate the V4 service from Ellenbrook, as standard vehicles not adapted for busway running.

In February 2019, TfGM were successful in bidding for funding support in buying an additional 10 electric buses for busway operation, to enter service in March 2020. These are Alexander Dennis Enviro400 MMC double-deckers with BYD Company battery power. TfGM intend that eventually all Vantage services will be operated by electric buses; to be purchased and owned by TfGM themselves, rather than by the service operator. Five of the existing fleet of Volvo B5LH buses were transferred to other services in Greater Manchester; and so total busway-equipped fleet increased to 30, allowing extra daytime frequency on V1 services from Leigh.

In 2023, under Tranche 1 of the Bee Network, the existing fleet passed from First Greater Manchester to Go North West. Under Go North West, a fleet of MCV EvoSeti bodied Volvo B5LH, originally from Go Ahead London and having the centre doors removed, were added on the BRT routes to expand the fleet. These buses, along with the original fleet have gradually been repainted to Bee Network yellow. To enhance the frequency of the services, in 2025, a fleet of Wright Eclipse Gemini 2 bodied Volvo B9TL from Go-Ahead London were added the fleet. All existing buses currently used on the service are being replaced with 43 new Wright StreetDeck Electroliners during 2026.

=== Stops, signalling and ticketing ===
Stops along the guided busway section provide level-boarding from platforms and are equipped with passenger information display screens. The guided busway crosses local roads on level, light-controlled junctions at which busway services have priority.

== Awards ==
The scheme won the Transport Policy, Planning and Implementation award at the Chartered Institute of Logistics and Transport North West Awards and the award for sustainability at the 10th annual North West Construction Awards in 2016. The launch of the Vantage service won the Transport Project of the Year category and the Leigh to Ellenbrook Guided Busway section was the winner in the Construction and Engineering category at the National and the North of England Transport Awards in December 2016. Greater Manchester's Bus Priority Package won the National Transport Award for improvements to bus services in October 2017.

== History ==
=== Planning ===
A long legal process preceded the busway's construction, including a public inquiry in 2002. The decision of the public inquiry was delayed because of great crested newts occupying a site on the route. The Department for Transport granted powers to build the busway in 2005 and it was projected to be built by 2009 but preliminary work only started in 2012. Powers to build it are set out in the Greater Manchester (Leigh Busway) Order 2005 in the Transport and Works Act. The Greater Manchester Passenger Transport Executive estimated in 2005 that the busway would generate around 2 million passenger trips per annum. After the public inquiry, a branch bus route from Atherton to Tyldesley and an extension from Manchester city centre to the Manchester Royal Infirmary were added to the scheme.

=== Construction ===
Site clearance for the dedicated busway section between Leigh and Ellenbrook took place between November 2012 and March 2013. TfGM spent £122 million on bus priority investment of which the guided busway track and infrastructure cost £68 million and the rest was spent upgrading associated local roads, bus lanes and junctions. The Greater Manchester Transport Fund provided most of the funding and the Department for Transport contributed £32.5 million.

=== Integration with other services ===
From 24 September 2023, the busway became part of the Bee Network, a London-style integrated transport system.

In July 2024, the Greater Manchester Combined Authority published its 'Draft GM Rapid Transit Strategy' proposing priority schemes for expansion of rapid transit of all forms across Greater Manchester, up to the year 2040. This states that "The Leigh–Salford–Manchester Busway is another clear example of our successful approach to rapid transit in action, carrying over two and a half million journeys per year and removing the need for around half a million car journeys"; and proposes this as a model that might be considered for other parts of the Greater Manchester conurbation, especially for serving Manchester Airport and the proposed growth area of the 'Atom Valley' between Bury and Rochdale. The Strategy proposes that, as BRT demand is expected to continue to grow, so frequencies along this busway should be increased; and also that an additional stop should be provided on the guided section to serve new residential developments in Mosley Common south of Tyldesley.

== See also ==
- Free buses in Greater Manchester
