= St George's Colliery =

Coal mine in England

Coordinates: 53.5119°N 2.4726°W

St George's Colliery, Back o't' Church, was a coal mine operating on the Manchester Coalfield after 1866 in Tyldesley, Greater Manchester, then in the historic county of Lancashire, England. It was owned by Sir Edmund Buckley. The colliery was situated to the south of Tyldesley Station on the Tyldesley Loopline and named after St George's Church.

The colliery's two shafts were sunk to the Rams mine commencing in 1866 by Astley and Tyldesley Coal and Salt Company to exploit the Middle Coal Measures of the Manchester Coalfield. The colliery was linked to Gin Pit Colliery for ventilation. A third shaft to the Trencherbone mine was sunk in 1884 and was deepened to the Arley mine. The colliery worked the Seven Foot until 1929.

The colliery became part of Manchester Collieries in 1929 ceased coal production in 1941 but retained for ventilation purposes until 1964.

== See also ==
- List of Collieries in Astley and Tyldesley
- Glossary of coal mining terminology
