= Shakerley Colliery (Greens) =

Coal mine in England

Coordinates: 53.5182°N 2.4694°W

Shakerley Colliery was a coal mine on the Manchester Coalfield near Shakerley, Tyldesley, Greater Manchester, then in the historic county of Lancashire, England. It was sunk in 1867 and was operating in 1878. The colliery on Shakerley Common had a single shaft which was sunk to the Rams mine at 300 feet by George Green to exploit the Middle Coal Measures of the Lancashire Coalfield and became part of the Tyldesley Coal Company in 1870. It had the first iron headgear in the country but closed by 1886.

== See also ==
- List of Collieries in Astley and Tyldesley
- Glossary of coal mining terminology
