= Bridgewater Collieries =

Bridgewater Collieries originated from the coal mines on the Manchester Coalfield in Worsley in the historic county of Lancashire owned by Francis Egerton, 3rd Duke of Bridgewater in the second half of the 18th century. After the Duke's death in 1803 his estate was managed by the Bridgewater Trustees until the 3rd Earl of Ellesmere inherited the estates in 1903. Bridgewater Collieries was formed in 1921 by the 4th Earl. The company merged with other prominent mining companies to form Manchester Collieries in 1929.

== History ==
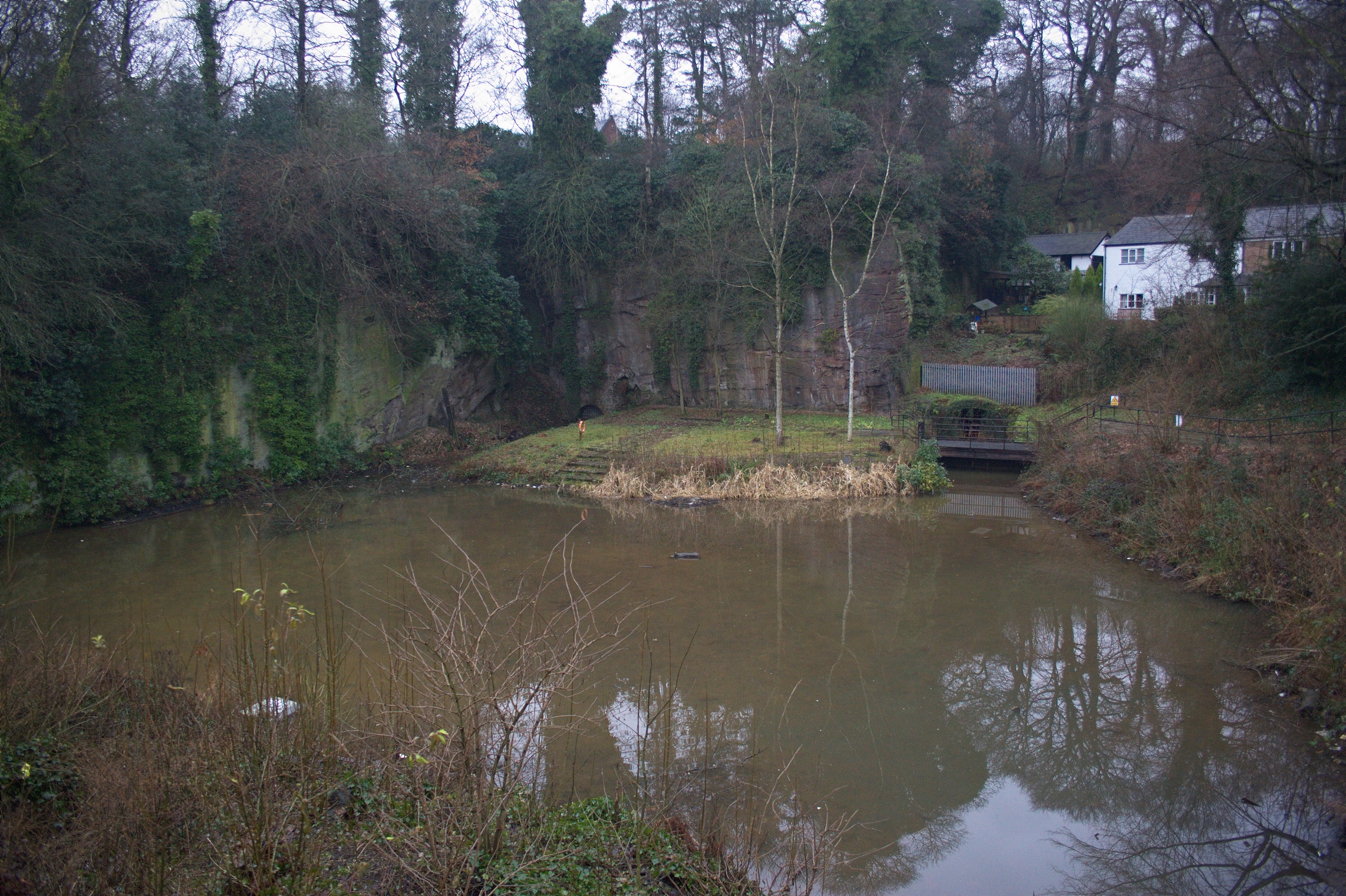
Worsley Delph, the entrance to the Duke of Bridgewater's underground mines

Small scale coal mining had been carried on since the Middle Ages where coal seams outcropped in Worsley and the surrounding area. John Edgerton, the first Duke of Bridgewater, bought the Worsley estate in 1630. After inheriting the estate in 1748 the third Duke was keen to exploit the resources under his largely agricultural estate but the coal mines he inherited were small and particularly wet as water percolated through porous sandstone above the coal. The problem was solved by driving an underground level intersecting the coal seams northwards towards Walkden from the Bridgewater Canal into the rock face of an old quarry at the Delph. This level served two purposes, it drained the coal workings and provided a means of transporting coal out of the mines. The Worsley Navigable Levels developed into an extensive system of underground canals branching from the original level. The mine workings were also accessed by several shafts sunk along the main drainage level providing access for colliers and materials. These included Wood Pit, Ingles Pit and Kempnough Pit in Worsley and Edge Fold Pits and Mangnall's Pit in Walkden. Workshops were built at Walkden. The underground levels were driven as far as Farnworth, Linnyshaw, and westwards towards Chaddock Pit in Tyldesley.

=== Bridgewater Trustees ===
In order to acquire the mineral rights, in 1810 Robert Haldane Bradshaw, Superintendent of the Bridgewater Trustees bought the Chaddock estate in Tyldesley and the Booths estate in Boothstown which extended to 50 Cheshire acres (43 ha). He also bought the Garrett Hall estate in Tyldesley in 1829. The Duke had sunk the Queen Anne and Chaddock Pits in the 18th century and by about 1820 they were linked to the Bridgewater Canal at Boothstown Basin by an underground level. In 1838 Chaddock Pit was the biggest colliery in Tyldesley and was still working in 1848.

By 1830 over 300 shallow pits had been sunk including some at Wardley near the Preston to Manchester road, most were short-lived. Abbot's Fold pit worked the Worsley Four Foot mine and was linked by an underground level to Ingles pit at Worsley and possibly had a tramway to the canal. To the north Mather's Field pit worked the Bin mine and coal was wound by a steam engine. In the 1830 the Burgess Land pit was sunk to the Bin mine north of Ellenbrook, it employed 35 "men and boys" in 1852 and was linked to the canal by a tramroad. Shude Hill pit had a steam winding engine. The City and Gatley pits at New Manchester north of Mosley Common were sunk in the 1840s and linked to the navigable levels and a horse-drawn tramroad to Mathers Fold. These pits worked the Brassey mine at 262 feet and the Rams mine at 360 feet and employed 64 workers in 1852. An explosion of firedamp in 1838 and a roof fall in 1843 caused two deaths. The Bridgewater Trustees began sinking deep shafts closer to the Ellenbrook in 1862 and the pits became known as Mosley Common Colliery. The area has been opencasted.

During the 1860s deep pits were sunk at Sandhole and Linnyshaw Collieries.

== See also ==
- List of Collieries in Astley and Tyldesley
- Glossary of coal mining terminology
