= Nook Colliery =

Coal mine in England

Coordinates: 53.5073°N 2.4694°W

Nook Colliery was a coal mine operating on the Manchester Coalfield after 1866 in Tyldesley, Greater Manchester, then in the historic county of Lancashire, England.

The colliery's first shaft was sunk to the Rams mine at 455 yards in 1866 by Astley and Tyldesley Coal and Salt Company to exploit the Middle Coal Measures of the Manchester Coalfield. The colliery expanded and eventually had five shafts and became one of the largest pits on the coalfield. No.2 upcast shaft was sunk in 1873 and deepened to the Arley mine, a hot mine where temperatures reached 100 Fahrenheit, at 935 yards. No.3 shaft was sunk to 707 yards to the Trencherbone mine through water-bearing rock in 1899. No.4 shaft, sunk in 1913, intersected every workable coal seam. The colliery had two horizontal winding engines.

The colliery became part of Manchester Collieries in 1929 and the National Coal Board in 1947. In 1954, 1000 men were employed producing 440,000 tons of coal per annum. After closure most colliery buildings were demolished and the site landscaped. The pithead bath house built by the Miner's Welfare Committee in the 1930s survived and was converted to other uses. The pit was the subject of a painting by local artist, Roger Hampson.

== See also ==
- List of Collieries in Astley and Tyldesley
- Glossary of coal mining terminology
