= Cleworth Hall Colliery =

Coal mine in Greater Manchester, England

Coordinates: 53.5169°N 2.4532°W

Cleworth Hall Colliery was a coal mine operating on the Manchester Coalfield after 1874 in Tyldesley, Greater Manchester, then in the historic county of Lancashire, England.

== Geology ==
Cleworth Hall Colliery exploited the Middle Coal Measures of the Lancashire Coalfield which were laid down in the Carboniferous period and where coal is mined from seams between the Worsley Four Foot and Arley mines. (Note: In this part of Lancashire a coal seam is referred to as a mine and the coal mine as a colliery or pit.) The seams generally dip towards the south and west and are affected by small faults. The Upper Coal Measures are not worked in this part of the coalfield.

== History ==
Cleworth Hall, the largest and longest lasting of the collieries owned by the Tyldesley Coal Company was sunk under the Cleworth Hall estate to the east of Yew Tree Colliery in 1874. The two original shafts were sunk to the Rams and Black and White mines. The Crombouke mine at a depth of 71 yards was worked until 1890 when its coal was exhausted. No.2 shaft was deepened to the Trencherbone mine and a third shaft was sunk in the early 1890s. The pits were originally ventilated by furnace at No.2 shaft. Cleworth Hall colliery was modernised before 1914 and the shaft to the Arley mine equipped with steel headgear and a washery and coal preparation plant were built near the pit head.

In 1896 Cleworth Hall employed 304 men underground and 46 surface workers. Gas coal, household and manufacturing coal were mined from the Black and White, Six-Foot and Trencherbone, mines.

== See also ==
- List of collieries in Astley and Tyldesley
- Glossary of coal mining terminology
