= Combermere Colliery =

Coordinates: 53.5244°N 2.4532°W

Combermere Colliery was a coal mine operating on the Manchester Coalfield after 1867 in Shakerley, Tyldesley, Greater Manchester, then in the historic county of Lancashire, England.

Combermere Colliery's two shafts, one for ventilation, were sunk to the Rams mine at 315 feet and the black and White mine at 600 feet by the Tyldesley Coal Company and opened in 1867. The colliery had a short life and closed in 1893. The company built a brickworks using fireclay from the mine at Combermere and the railway to it operated until the mid-1930s.

== See also ==
- List of Collieries in Astley and Tyldesley
- Glossary of coal mining terminology
