= Shakerley =

Suburb of Tyldesley, Greater Manchester, England

Coordinates: 53.5277°N 2.4608°W

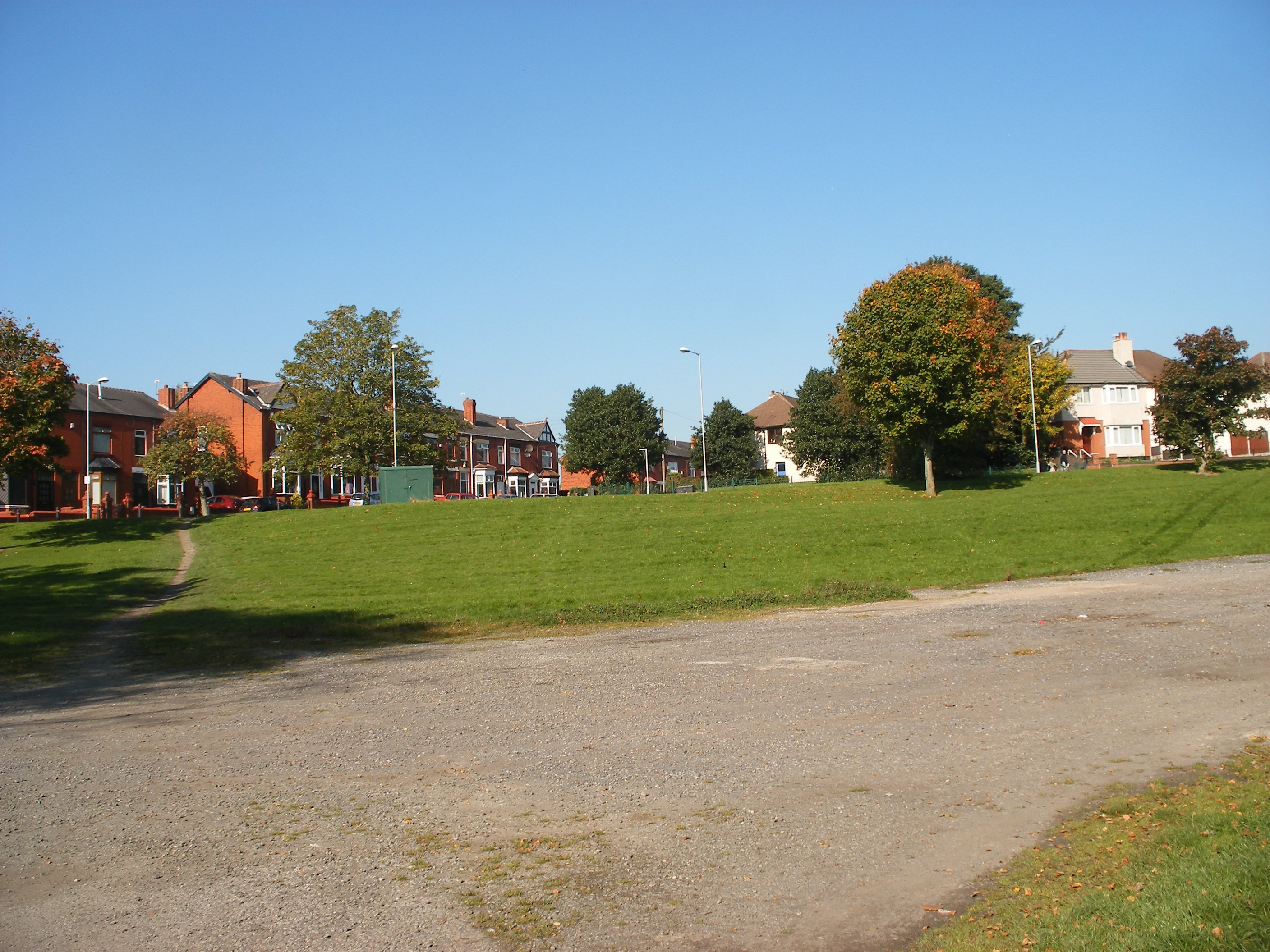
- Houses in Shakerley

- Location within Greater Manchester
- OS grid reference: SD695035
  - London: 170 mi (274 km) SE
- Metropolitan borough: Wigan
- Metropolitan county: Greater Manchester
- Region: North West
- Country: England
- Sovereign state: United Kingdom
- Post town: MANCHESTER
- Postcode district: M29
- Dialling code: 01942
- Police: Greater Manchester
- Fire: Greater Manchester
- Ambulance: North West
- UK Parliament: Leigh

Shakerley is a suburb of Tyldesley in the Metropolitan Borough of Wigan, Greater Manchester, England. It was anciently a hamlet in the northwest of the township of Tyldesley cum Shakerley, in the ancient parish of Leigh. The boundary between Shakerley and Hindsford is the Hindsford Brook. It remains the boundary between Tyldesley and Atherton. Hyndforth Bridge across the brook, was rebuilt in stone in 1629.

== History ==
=== Toponymy ===
Shakerley is derived from the Old English sceacere and leah meaning the robbers woodland glade or clearing. It was recorded as Shakerlee in 1210. The ending "ley" denotes the area was once cleared of forest. Two old house names, "Higher Oak" and "Lower Oak", refer to the oak forest that once covered the area. Hindsford Brook, once the Goderic Brook, was named after a Saxon saint.

=== Early history ===
An ancient Roman road from Mamucium to Coccium (Manchester to Wigan) passed through the hamlet.

Shakerley was home to the Shakerley family who lived at Shakerley Old Hall, close to the Shakerley Brook and the old Roman road between Manchester and Wigan. It was not a manor house but a manor by reputation. Hugh Tyldesley endowed Cockersand Abbey with the hamlet of Shakerley in the early 13th century and the Shakerley family paid rent to the canons of the abbey and also paid dues to the Tyldesleys. The Shakerleys finally left the Old Hall in about 1520 and the family migrated to Cheshire. The last of the Shakerleys to live at Shakerley Old Hall, Hugh, was buried in Leigh and the hall became a farmhouse.

In 1646 the Royalist Geoffrey Shakerley was ordered to pay a fine and sequestration of his lands for his support of King Charles I. They included Shakerley Old Hall, land and the corn mill, and five nail smithies at Shakerley. In 1667 Shakerley Old Hall was a magnificent home containing the hall, cellars, brewhouse, buttery, dairy, dining room, parlour and various chambers. By 1742 it was home to a succession of tenant farmers.

The corn mill was mentioned in 1656 and Henry Hindley, miller at Shakerley died in 1697. In 1785 the mill was let to Joseph Adkin. By 1811 it had been converted into a carding and spinning shed. After that it was converted to cottages which lasted into the 20th century. The first inn to be recorded in the township was "Mather's Inn" in 1696 and the innkeeper was William Mather.

The Shakerley family, absent landlords, finally relinquished their tenure of the hamlet when it was auctioned in 1836. The sale included farms and land totalling 514 statute acres with "valuable mines of coal and stone lying under the same". The estate was bought by Jacob Fletcher of Peel Hall, Little Hulton.

=== Industry ===
Coal was got in Shakerley in the early 15th century. An armed dispute between the Shakerleys and the Tyldesleys over the digging of "seacole" was recorded in 1429. In 1748 Shakerley the most populous and industrialised part of the township of Tyldesley cum Shakerley. There was a colliery in Shakerley in 1798 owned by John Hope of Chaddock Hall. It was bought in 1836 by Jacob Fletcher when he acquired the Shakerley estate. In 1853 the owner was Nathan Fletcher. Shakerley Collieries included the Wellington and Nelson Pits. Nelson Pit was close to the Old Toll Bar. The pits became part of Manchester Collieries in 1934. Nelson Pit was closed in 1939. As the colliery was isolated from the road through Tyldesley a cobblestone road known as the Old Toll Bar Road was made across Shakerley to near Green Hall in Atherton. Shakerley Lane was a toll road until 1949 when the toll house was demolished.

Disasters at the Shakerley pits included the death of six men when the cage rope broke at the Nelson Pit on 2 October 1883. Then on 1 October 1895 five men including the colliery manager and undermanager died at Shakerley Colliery after an explosion of firedamp. The Tyldesley Coal Company had collieries at Combermere and Peelwood. A brickworks was built at Combermere after the pit closed.

There are several references to nailers in Shakerley. In 1846 the Shakerleys owned five nail smithies. James Astley was a nailor who died in 1681. There were nailers in Shakerley in between 1820 and 1840 but the rise of other industries meant nail making became extinct in Shakerley soon after. Crow Bank was a farm near the Hindsford Brook, Thomas and Henry Kniveton were tenant farmers who also sold gunpowder and explosives from a magazine in their fields to the local colliery owners.

=== Break up of the estate ===
The Shakerley estate was broken up in 1951. The farms, Old Shams on Shakerley Lane, Greenfield, Eckersley Fold and Common Fold were sold and Tyldesley Urban District Council acquired Shakerley Common in addition to land for housing. Over the next thirty years most of Shakerley was developed for council housing.

== Geography ==
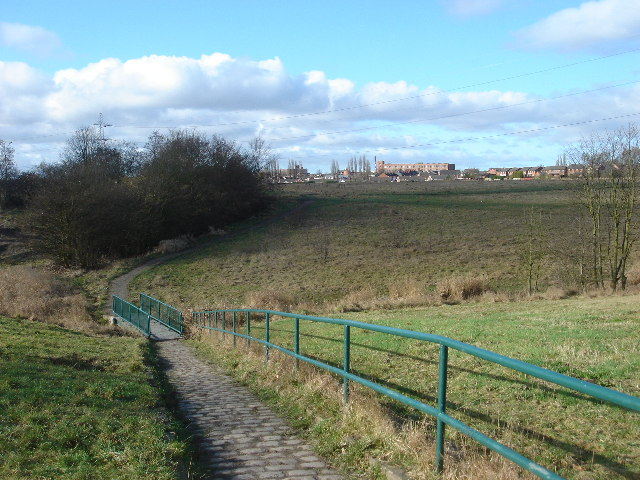
Footbridge on path between Shakerley and Atherton

Shakerley is the north western portion of the old township of Tyldesley cum Shakerley. The Hindsford Brook flowing north to south is the ancient boundary between Shakerley and Atherton. Shakerley Brook flows east to west across the hamlet meeting the Hindsford Brook at Hindsford Bridge on the Tyldesley-Atherton boundary. The area between these brooks is mostly flat and the underlying rocks are the coal measures of the Manchester Coalfield.

== Economy ==
Shakerley is predominantly residential and mostly social housing. The Shakerley estate is amongst the 7% most deprived neighbourhoods nationally.

== Transport ==
There is only one road into Shakerley, accessed from the A577 on the border with Hindsford. The old toll road, Shakerley Lane has been closed to traffic and is now a bridleway and footpath. Buses operated by Diamond Bus North West operate services into Shakerley. The Lancashire and Yorkshire Railway's line from Manchester to Southport passes through the north of Shakerley and Atherton Station is the nearest station.

== Religion ==
In 1558 a nailor, Jeffrey Hurst, instigated religious dissent in Shakerley. He had been influenced by his brother-in-law George Marsh of Deane. Travelling preachers held religious meetings and preached in Hurst's house. When Mary I ascended the throne in 1553 and the Marian Persecutions began, Hurst persisted preaching the Protestant faith, he refused to attend mass and for safety fled into Yorkshire. He returned after his father died but a warrant was issued for his arrest. Thomas Leyland of Morleys Hall in Astley, accompanied by his chaplain, Ralph Parkinson rode to Shakerley and searched Hurst's mother's house but did not find him. Leyland apologised for entering her property but found nothing except Latin grammars and a small Tyndale Bible. Hurst's mother and brother had to guarantee that the "heretic" would appear before him at Morleys. This he did after three weeks and was sent to be tried at Lancaster Castle. In November 1558, Mary I died saving Hurst from the martyrdom that his brother-in-law suffered at the stake at Chester in 1555.

John Wesley visited Shakerley four times, in May 1748, October 1749, April 1751 and June 1752. Religious dissent again took hold in Shakerley and in 1770 a house had been authorised for meetings.

== Education ==
Thomas Higginson, son of a Shakerley nailor, was sent to Cambridge University where he graduated with a BA in 1648. Another Shakerley man was a graduate of Brasenose College, Oxford in 1671, he was John Battersby who became vicar of Astley Chapel and died in 1690.

From the early 1970s there was a primary school in Shakerley but it closed in 2007.
