= St Mary the Virgin's Church, Ellenbrook =

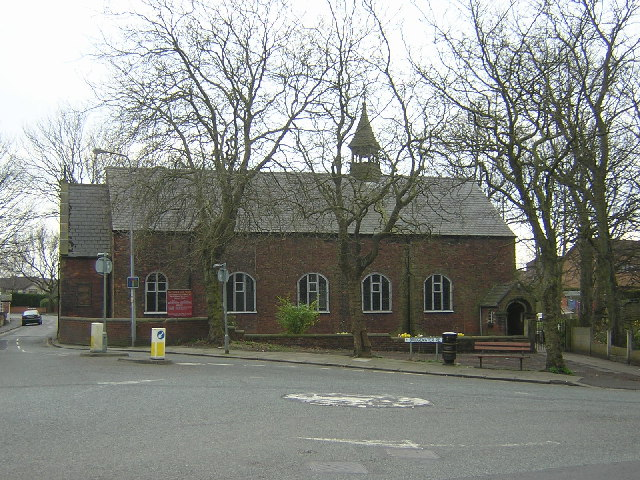
- St Mary the Virgin's Church, Ellenbrook
- 53.5102°N 2.4135°W
- OS grid reference: SD 72646 01571
- Location: Ellenbrook, Greater Manchester
- Country: England
- Denomination: Anglican

History
- Founded: 13th century
- Consecrated: 1725 present church

Architecture
- Functional status: Active

Specifications
- Materials: Brick

St Mary the Virgin's Church or Ellenbrook Chapel is an active Anglican church in Ellenbrook, Worsley, Greater Manchester, England.

The church is part of a team ministry with St Mark's Church, Worsley and St Andrew, Boothstown. It is in the Eccles deanery, the archdeaconry of Salford and the diocese of Manchester. The church was granted Grade II listed status in 1966.

== History ==
The original Ellenbrook Chapel was founded by the lords of the manor of Worsley. Sometime between 1272 and 1295 the Rector of Eccles granted a licence to Richard de Worsley to have chantry in his chapel at Worsley. The next mention of a chapel was in 1549 when Sir Richard Brereton complained of the theft of a chalice from his chapel. Dame Dorothy Legh left the interest of £50 for its maintenance in 1638. The Bishop of Chester made an order as to its endowment in 1677. The dissident Lord Willoughby locked out the curate in charge in about 1693 and put in a Nonconformist preacher, but was defeated by the bishop.

A replacement church was built on the same site in 1725.

== Architecture ==
The church in Flemish bond brick has a slate roof and was subsequently extended at the east end. It has a five-bay nave with plain, segment-headed window openings and the chancel has a three-lancet east window. The south aisle and bell cote were added in the 19th century and its vestry dates from the 20th century. The gabled porch on the north side has a Norman-style arched entrance. The roof is supported by king post trusses.
