= Ellenbrook, Greater Manchester =

Coordinates: 53.511°N 2.412°W

Ellenbrook
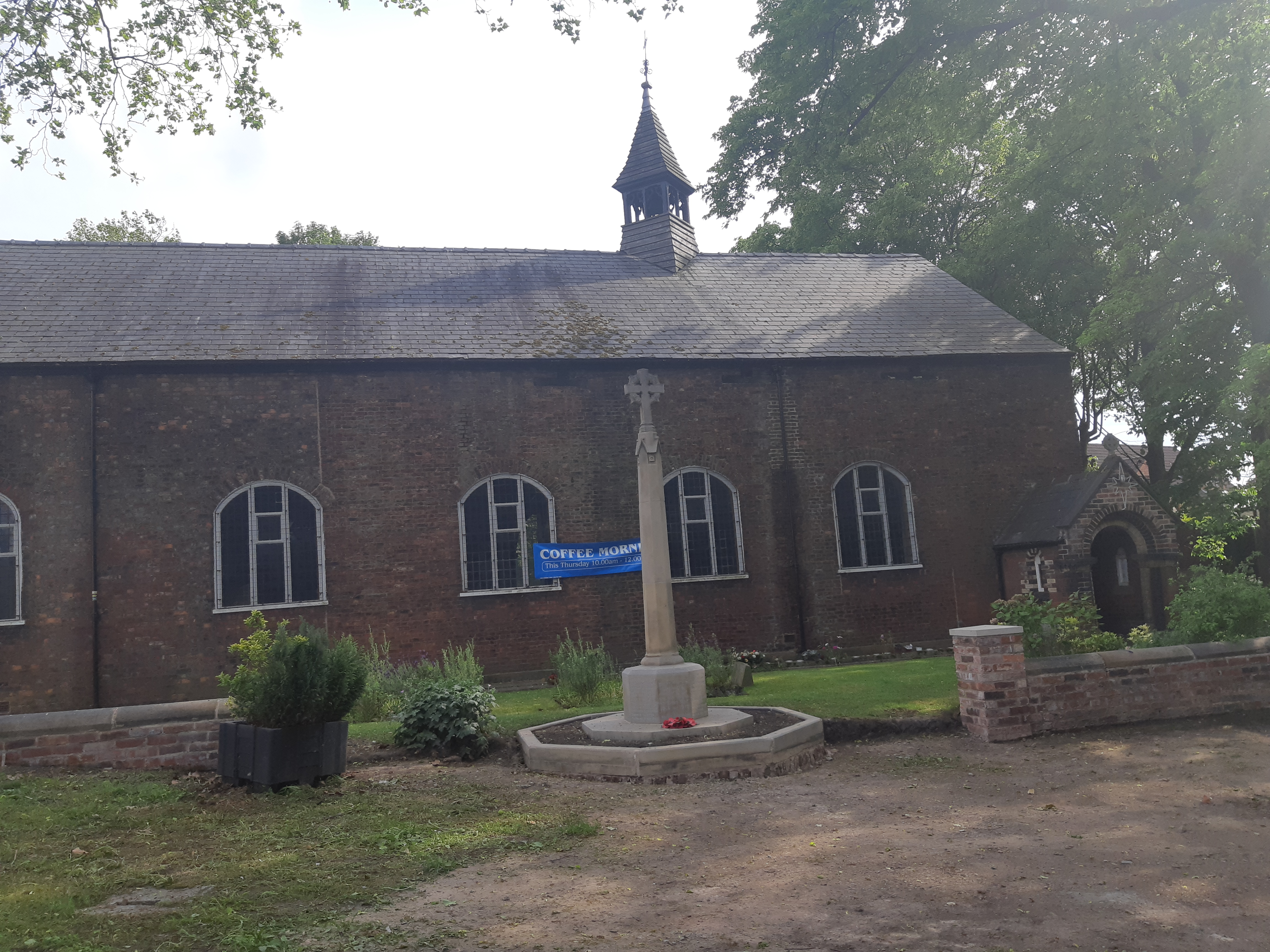
- Ellenbrook Chapel of St Mary the Virgin

- Location within Greater Manchester
- OS grid reference: SD726016
- Metropolitan borough: City of Salford
- Metropolitan county: Greater Manchester
- Region: North West
- Country: England
- Sovereign state: United Kingdom
- Post town: MANCHESTER
- Postcode district: M28
- Dialling code: 0161
- Police: Greater Manchester
- Fire: Greater Manchester
- Ambulance: North West
- UK Parliament: Worsley and Eccles South

Ellenbrook is a suburb of Worsley, in the City of Salford in Greater Manchester, England. Ellenbrook is 6.8 miles (10.9 km) west of Manchester, 5 miles (8.0 km) west of Salford and 4.6 miles (7.4 km) south of Bolton. Historically a part of Lancashire, it is close to Astley, Mosley Common and Walkden, by the East Lancashire Road.

== History ==
=== Toponymy ===
The origin of the first element of the name is unknown, but the second element is certainly from Old English broc, a brook or stream. Ellenbrook is situated by the Ellen Brook which becomes the Stirrup Brook in Boothstown.

An ancient stone marked the boundary between the Hundreds of Salford and West Derby, the boundary of Eccles and Leigh ecclesiastical parishes, Tyldesley, Worsley and Little Hulton townships and the metropolitan districts of Wigan and Salford.

=== Church ===
Historically Ellenbrook was a chapelry in the parish of Eccles. Though its exact origins are uncertain between 1272 and 1295 the Rector of Eccles granted a licence to Richard de Worsley to have a chantry chapel provided 6d (2½p) was paid annually as oblations. It was an outlying chapel within the parish of Eccles, the nearest churches being at Eccles, Leigh and Deane in Bolton.

The old chapel was demolished and St. Mary's Church was rebuilt in brick in 1725 and was restored in the 1860s, funded by the 2nd Earl of Ellesmere who died before restoration was complete. The chapel's organ, a memorial to the Earl, dates from this time. The church is built in the Norman style and is a Grade II Listed building.

=== Industrial Revolution ===
The Duke of Bridgewater owned small shallow collieries at Crookes Meadow, Grundy Common and Clays before 1770. Common, Swiney Lane and Millhough were shafts opened between 1810 and 1820. In the 1830s a horse-drawn tramway connected Bridgewater Collieries' pits north of Ellenbrook at New Manchester with the Bridgewater Canal at Boothstown canal basin. In 1861 the London and North Western Railway revived powers granted to the Lancashire and Yorkshire Railway to build a railway from Eccles to Wigan through Ellenbrook railway station which was north of the new Mosley Common Colliery which had extensive sidings at Ellenbrook.

== Governance ==
From the 11th century, the chapelry of Ellenbrook was part of the township of Worsley in the ancient ecclesiastical parish Eccles in the hundred of Salford, and county of Lancashire.

Ellenbrook is represented in the UK parliament by Barbara Keeley, Labour MP for Worsley & Eccles South.

Boothstown and Ellenbrook ward of Salford City Council is represented by three Conservative councillors: Les Turner, Darren Ward and Bob Clarke.

== Transport ==
Ellenbrook had a station on the former Tyldesley Loopline which ran between Eccles and Leigh. The trackbed is now occupied by the Leigh-Salford-Manchester Bus Rapid Transit, from Leigh to Manchester. The rest of the trackbed to Eccles is a greenway.

== Education and community ==
Ellenbrook Community Primary School 130396 is in the suburb. Since its most recent Ofsted inspection from May 2023, the school has been given the Outstanding rating.

The area has a church, public houses (the Boundary Stone and the Woodside), a Co-operative Food shop, takeaways, a pharmacy and a doctors' surgery.
