= Yew Tree Colliery =

Coal mine in the Manchester Coalfield, England

Coordinates: 53.515°N 2.443°W

Yew Tree Colliery was a coal mine operating on the Manchester Coalfield after 1845 in Tyldesley, Greater Manchester, then in the historic county of Lancashire, England.

In 1845 George Green of Wharton Hall, Little Hulton, and his brother leased land at Yew Tree Farm and sank a shaft to prospect for coal. This became Yew Tree Colliery. Before 1851 Green built a tramroad to link the colliery to the Bridgewater Canal east of Astley Green. At the Tyldesley end, the tramway was worked by cable down the steep slope of the Tyldesley Banks and horse-drawn wagons completed the journey. By 1858 the shaft was 250 feet (76 m) deep and the workings extended under the parish church.

After 1870 the colliery was part of the Tyldesley Coal Company. The colliery had two shafts, one for ventilation, sunk to the Rams mine at 600 feet (183 m). The shafts were deepened in the early 1890s to access the Black and White mine.

An explosion of firedamp, ignited by a safety lamp, in 1858 cost the lives of 25 men and boys. This was the worst mining disaster to occur in Tyldesley.

== See also ==
- List of Collieries in Astley and Tyldesley
- Glossary of coal mining terminology
- List of mining disasters in Lancashire
