= New Lester Colliery =

Coal mine in England

Coordinates: 53.519°N 2.436°W

New Lester Colliery was a coal mine operating on the Manchester Coalfield from the second half of the 19th century to the first half of the 20th century in Tyldesley, then in the historic county of Lancashire, England. It was owned by James Roscoe and two shafts were sunk in about 1865 on the east side of Mort Lane on the road to Little Hulton where Roscoe had sunk the Peel Hall and New Watergate pits.

At first the colliery was not linked to a railway and coal had to be moved using horses and carts until the London and North Western Railway built the Little Hulton mineral branch line in 1874. The Little Hulton mine was connected to the Lancashire and Yorkshire Railway's Manchester to Southport Line in 1888 at Peel Hall sidings and a private line built to New Lester.

James Roscoe and Sons was formed in 1892 remaining in operation until 1938 when Peel Collieries took over. New Lester's shafts were deepened to access the Arley mine in the early 1890s where 'Arley slack', poor quality coal for industrial use was mined. The colliery also won coal from the Yard mine which was known here as the Denner Main, the Four foot, Cannel, Plodder and Three Quarters mines. In 1939 the colliery employed 499 men underground and 169 surface workers and three years later 15 men underground and 13 on the surface. The colliery was completely closed by 1947. The area of these coal workings was opencasted after the Second World War.

== Locomotives ==
Roscoe's company bought Lord Kenyon, a six coupled saddle tank from the Hunslet Engine Company in 1884. In 1900 another Hunslet saddletank, Mary, in 1907 King Edward VII and in 1914 King George V were bought from Hunslets. They resembled the Manchester Ship Canal Company locomotives and could negotiate sharp curves.

== See also ==
- List of Collieries in Astley and Tyldesley
- Glossary of coal mining terminology
