= Sandhole Colliery =

Coordinates: 53.517°N 2.374°W

Sandhole Colliery (or Bridgewater Colliery) was a coal mine originally owned by the Bridgewater Trustees operating on the Manchester Coalfield in Walkden, Greater Manchester, then in the historic county of Lancashire, England. The colliery closed in 1962.

== History ==
The Bridgewater Trustees began sinking two 12-foot (3.7 m) diameter shafts for the Bridgewater Colliery in 1865. The winding house contained two engines built by Naysmyth, Wilson & Company. The engines survived until 1962 when the colliery closed. Two further shafts were sunk soon after, one of which was sunk to the Doe mine at 432 yards (395 m) for ventilation and emergency use. No 3 shaft was 14 feet 6 inches (4.42 m) in diameter and sunk to 330 yards (300 m). This shaft was deepened to 565 yards (517 m) in 1943.
