= Worsley Navigable Levels =

Coal mines in Greater Manchester

Coordinates: 53°30′2.2″N 2°22′52.2″W

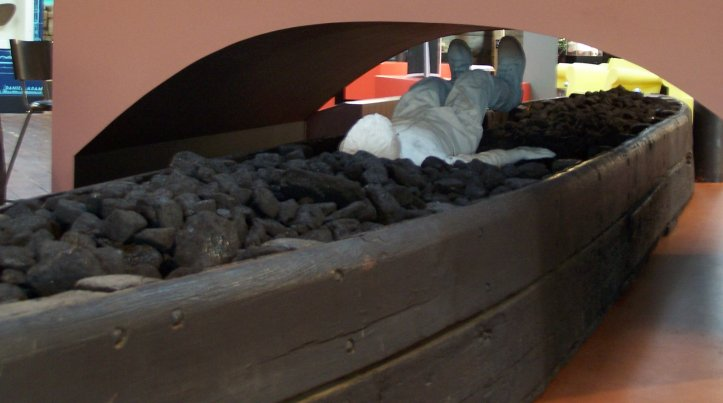
Starvationer at Ellesmere Port Canal Museum with a demonstration of the process of legging to push the boat through the tunnels

The Worsley Navigable Levels are an extensive series of coal mines in Worsley in the City of Salford in Greater Manchester, England. They were worked largely by the use of underground canals (the navigable levels) and boats called starvationers.

== In the beginning ==
Coal extraction was known in the area from as early as 1376 but large-scale development was left until the tenure of Francis Egerton, 3rd Duke of Bridgewater.

The first drainage sough was cut into the Earl of Bridgewater's estates in Worsley on the Manchester Coalfield in 1729 under the auspices of John Massey, the mines agent of Scroop Egerton, the 4th Earl and 1st Duke of Bridgewater. This sough was sited to provide drainage for as many mine works as possible in order to make its construction economic. The sough was 1,100 yards (1,000 m) long with 600 yards (550 m) underground. Water in the coal measures worked above the sough drained into it and deeper coal seams benefited because water needed to be lifted only to the sough not to the surface. This solution to the water drainage problem was successful and extensions of 450 yards (410 m) proceeded to allow other coal seams to be drained.

== The new duke ==
The dukedom passed to Scroop Egerton's fourth son John on Scroop's death in 1745 and subsequently, when John died in 1748, to Scroop's fifth son Francis, the 3rd Duke of Bridgewater. Francis Egerton gained full control of his estates in 1757 when he was 21 and hired John Gilbert as factor for his estates. It was clear to Francis Egerton and John Gilbert that the Duke of Bridgewater's coalmines would need to be much more efficient and productive in order to meet the rise in demand for coal in Manchester. One part of their plan was to dig a canal, the Bridgewater Canal, from Worsley to Salford on the River Irwell. This idea would improve the transport of coal but not the efficiency of mining. They then had the idea of extending the canal at Worsley underground to produce a navigable level within the coal measures for both drainage and coal transport. A consequence of this decision was that the water from the coalmines proved sufficient to keep the canal in water.

== The Bridgewater Canal and the Navigable Level ==
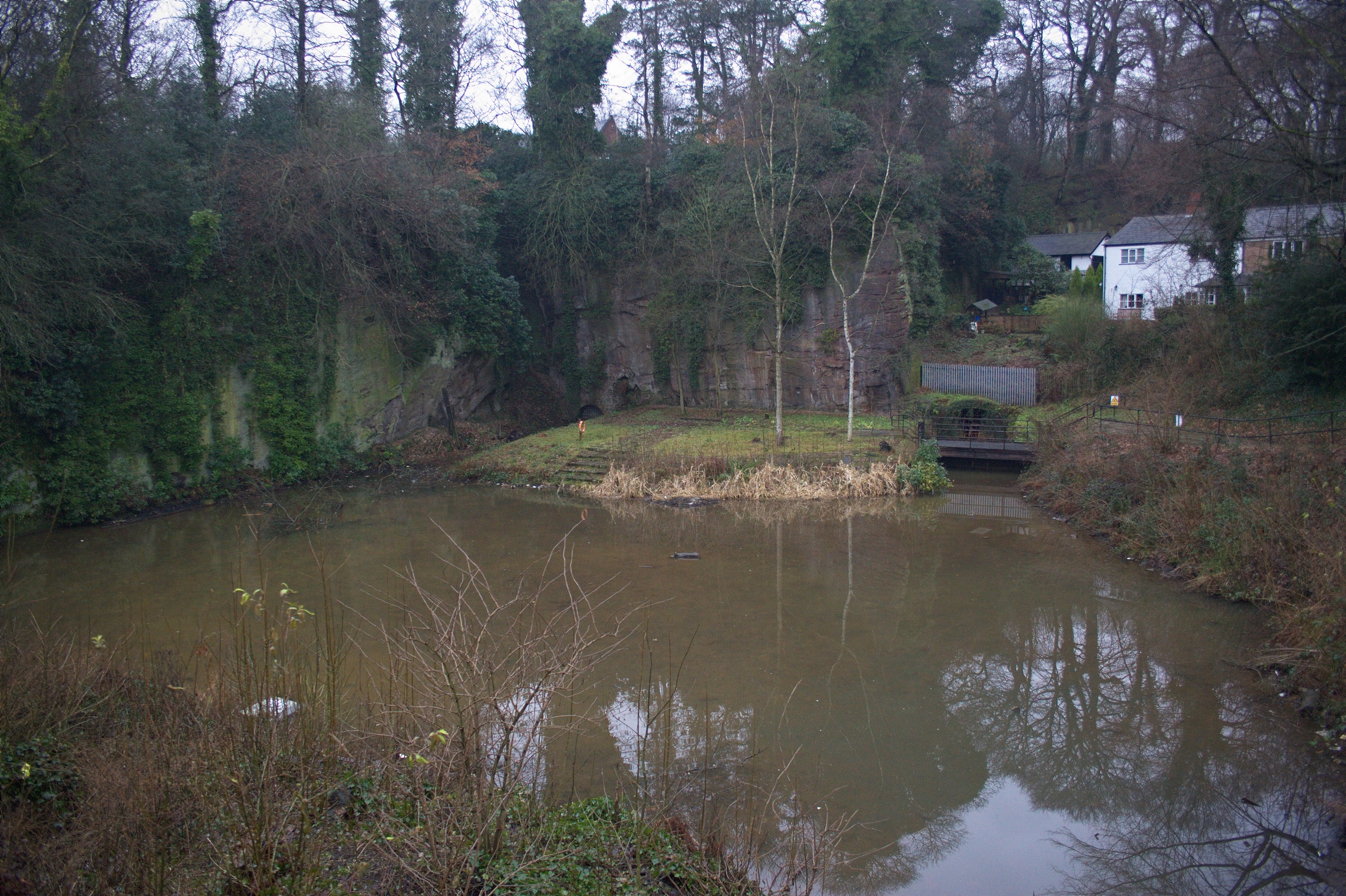
Worsley Delph, the entrance to the Duke of Bridgewater's underground mines

The act of Parliament allowing the building of the Bridgewater Canal – the Bridgewater Canal Act 1758 (32 Geo. 2. c. 2 Pr.) – was passed in 1759. The construction of the canal had already started when James Brindley became involved. Brindley took charge of the canal's construction. Several changes were made to the canal's course under Brindley's control and the canal was completed in 1764. Before and during the construction of the Bridgewater Canal the navigable level was begun and tunnelling progressed. A tunnel 8 feet (2.4 m) high was cut northwards into the rock from the canal level at Worsley providing 4 feet (1.2 m) of headroom and 4 feet (1.2 m) of water. The first workable seam (the Worsley Four Foot mine) was reached in 1761, 770 yards (700 m) from the tunnel's portal. The tunnel was not straight; it changed course in order to avoid trespassing under the land of neighbouring landlords. As new coal seams were intercepted branch levels into the seams were dug and extended as the coals were mined. The branch level along the Four Feet seam itself reached a length of 1.75 miles (2.8 km). Mine shafts were sunk and coal mined ahead of the intended line of the main navigable level, which was continually lengthened for many years reaching a length of 4 miles (6.4 km). In order to ease the congestion resulting from the large number of boats using the level a second entrance tunnel was dug, 500 yards (460 m) long, and a one-way system introduced.

== The Upper Navigable Level ==
In 1773 an upper navigable level was created by widening the original drainage sough with a finished length of 1.75 miles (2.8 km) and draining into the main navigable level. A sloped branch was driven from the upper level to the surface at a gradient of 1 in 4 to allow boats to be drawn up and lowered down. This incline was later continued downwards to the main level. Further navigable levels were dug below the main level to serve deeper seams; these were 57 yards (52 m) and 83 yards (76 m) deeper.

== The Underground Incline ==
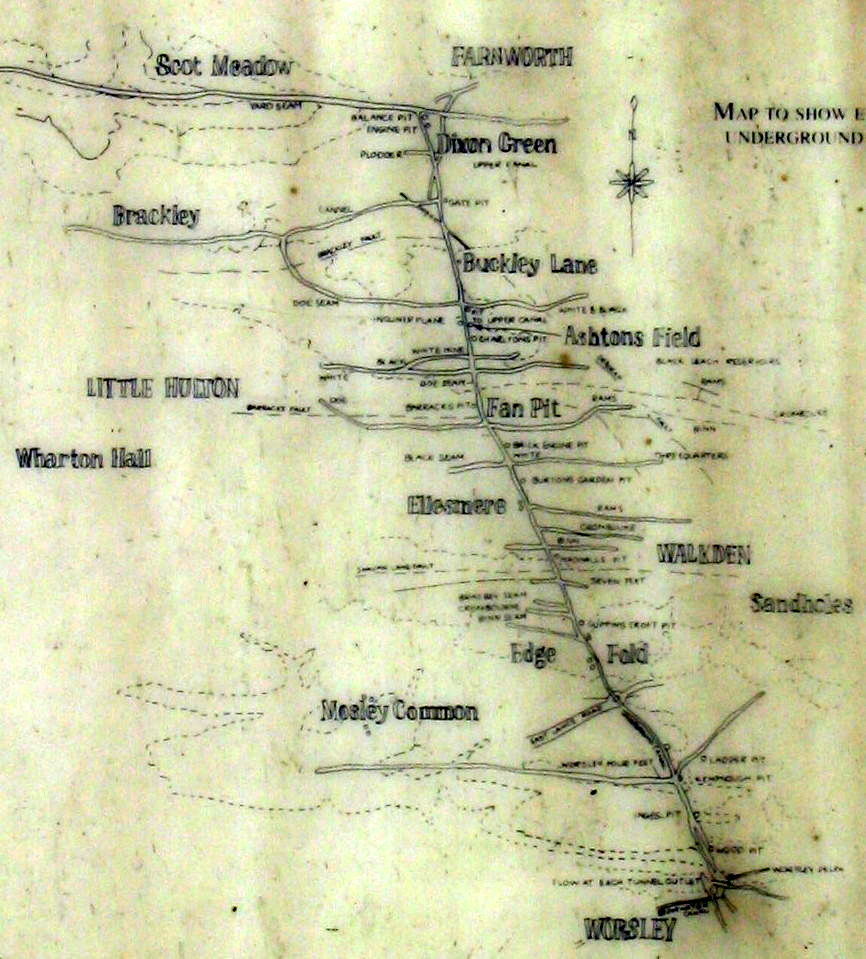
Signboard at Worsley, Salford, UK, showing the extent of the canal tunnels serving the Duke of Bridgewater's coal mines

Coals were moved between levels using vertical shafts until 1797, when an underground canal inclined plane started in 1795 was completed. It was 453 feet (138 m) long and raised boats 106 feet 6 inches (32.46 m) . There were two locks at the upper level from which two railway tracks descended to the lower main level. Boats entered the upper locks and were seated on wagons. The water was drained from the locks and the boats would descend the incline counterbalanced by a second empty boat ascending the parallel railway line. This incline worked until 1822 and the levels were used for coal transport until 1887, by which time the total length of navigable levels was 46 miles (74 km). The navigable levels continued to be used for drainage with regular inspections by boat until final closure in 1968.

== Bibliography ==
In 1812 the Duke of Bridgewater's heir, Francis Egerton, 8th Earl of Bridgewater, wrote a 47-page book on the underground canals entitled "Description du Plan Incliné Souterrain".

== See also ==
- Canals of Great Britain
- History of the British canal system
- List of canal tunnels in Great Britain
- Tub boat
