= Acre (Cheshire) =

Unit of area

A Cheshire acre is a unit of area historically used in the English county of Cheshire.

One Cheshire acre amounts to 10,240 square yards, or 92,160 square feet whereas a standard acre amounts to 4,840 square yards or 43,560 square feet; Thus a Cheshire acre is about 2.12 times larger than a standard acre.

Whereas a one-acre area ten times as long as wide would have dimensions of 66 by 660 feet (20 m × 201 m), the Cheshire acre of that shape would have dimensions of 96 by 960 feet (29 m × 293 m).
