= Manchester Coalfield =

Coal mining region in north-west England

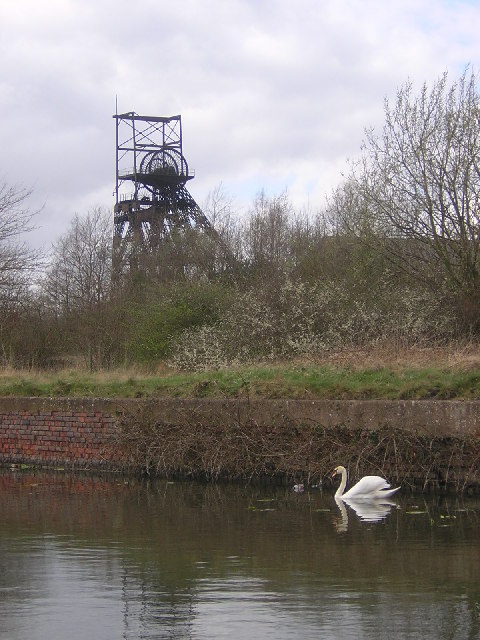
The pithead of Astley Green Colliery

The Manchester Coalfield is part of the South Lancashire Coalfield, the coal seams of which were laid down in the Carboniferous Period. Some easily accessible seams were worked on a small scale from the Middle Ages, and extensively from the beginning of the Industrial Revolution in the early 19th century until the last quarter of the 20th century. The Coal Measures lie above a bed of Millstone Grit and are interspersed with sandstones, mudstones, shales, and fireclays. The Lower Coal Measures occupy the high ground of the West Pennine Moors above Bolton and are not worked in the Manchester Coalfield. The most productive of the coal measures are the lower two thirds of the Middle Coal Measures where coal is mined from seams between the Worsley Four Foot and Arley mines. The deepest and most productive collieries were to the south of the coalfield. The coalfield is affected by the northwest to southeast aligned Pendleton Fault along the Irwell Valley and the Rossendale Valley anticline. The Coal Measures generally dip towards the south and west. Numerous other smaller faults affect the coalfield. The Upper Coal Measures are not worked in the Manchester Coalfield.

The early coal pits were dug to the shallow seams where they outcropped, particularly in the Irwell Valley and in Atherton. The early collieries were adits or bell pits exploiting the Worsley Four Foot Mine. Deeper mines were sunk when steam engines were developed to pump water from the shafts. Most collieries to the east of the Pendleton Fault had closed before 1929. A group of independent companies formed Manchester Collieries in 1929, to work the reserves of the coalfield.

== Coal seams of the West Manchester Coalfield ==
In this part of Lancashire a coal seam is referred to as a mine and the coal mine is a colliery or pit. The beds of coal in the Coal Measures are separated by layers of gritstones, sandstones, shales and mudstones of varying thicknesses. The mines were frequently named after their thickness – Yard, Three Quarters – or given local names in the areas in which they were first worked.

Seam	Alternative names	Description
Worsley Four Foot mine	Pendleton Four Foot, Parker mine in central Manchester	As the shallowest coal seam west of the Pendleton Fault, it was exploited from the early days of mining from bell pits and was accessed at the Delph at Worsley by the Worsley Navigable Levels. It is from 3 feet (0.91 m) to 4 feet (1.2 m) in thickness and was used as steam coal. The mine was wet due to the permeable sandstone above it. It was worked westwards from Worsley to Bedford Colliery. This coal seam is known as the Parker mine in the central coalfield under Manchester where a series of coal seams, the Bradford Group, was worked above it.
Bin mine	Top Five Quarters (Radcliffe)	The Bin Mine has a maximum height of 3 feet 9 inches (1.14 m); its coal was mainly used by industry. Above the Bin mine the sandstones contain a layer of ironstone.
Crombouke Mine	Crumbouke, Shuttle (Pendlebury), Albert (Pendleton), Top Yard (Radcliffe) Roger mine (central Manchester)	The Crombouke is a seam from 2 feet 6 inches to 4 feet 6 inches of good quality coal in the west and corresponds to the Roger mine in central Manchester. The Crombouke mine at Worsley thins out and is known as the Albert at Pendleton, The Crombouke mine at Pendleton is found below the Albert.
Brassey mine	Brassey Bottoms, Little (Newtown)	The Brassey mine is thickest around Tyldesley at 4 feet (1.2 m) thick.
Rams mine	Seven Foot (Walkden), Six Foot (Tyldesley)	The Rams mine has a minimum thickness of 4 feet (1.2 m) and average thickness of 6 feet (1.8 m) west of the fault. To the east it is up to 9 feet (2.7 m) in thickness. The high quality coal was mined to considerable depths under Pendlebury and Salford. At Atherton it formed good quality steam coal.
Black and White mine	Seven Foot (Tyldesley), Gingham mine (Black mine), Ten Foot (White mine) in (Bolton and Little Lever, east of fault), Great mine in Atherton	The Black and White mine is a double seam with 7 feet 5 inches (2.26 m) of workable coal. Top coal is the White mine and bottom coal is the Black mine. It outcrops at the south east corner of Hulton Park and in Little Hulton and across Gibfield and Chowbent in Atherton where it was mined in shallow ladder pits or drifts. The seam measured 7 feet 10 inches (2.39 m) in Atherton town centre.
Doe mine	Dow, Yard (Tyldesley)	The Doe mine has two coals separated by a dirt parting. At Newtown the seam was liable to spontaneous combustion. The lower coals of this mine were worked around Tyldesley as the Yard mine, near Bolton the top coal was worked as the Bancroft mine. The seam outcrops on either side of the River Irwell at Clifton where the seam was worked at the Ladyshore Colliery.
Five Quarters mine	Yard (Atherton)	This seam was worked extensively east of the Irwell Valley Fault around Radcliffe. The seam was split by a dirt band and the coal was used as steam and household coal.
Hell Hole mine	Victoria, Foor Foot (Atherton)	This coal seam varies in thickness between 2 feet 6 inches (0.76 m) and 4 feet (1.2 m) and the coal was used for coking and gas making and household use.
Trencherbone mine		The Trencherbone mine was extensively worked throughout the coalfield and reputedly produced the best coal. It outcropped at Stoneclough in the Irwell Valley. It had a thickness of 3 feet (0.91 m) to 4 feet (1.2 m) at Astley and Tyldesley and up to 8 feet (2.4 m) elsewhere. The seam outcropped between Schofield Lane and Bag Lane in Atherton.
Cannel mine	King and Cannel	The Cannel mine was on average less than one foot thick. Cannel coal burns easily with a bright light and leaves little ash. This was the lowest coal seam worked east of the Irwell Valley. Cannel was used to make coal gas.
Sapling mine		The Sapling mine is thickest in the west but reduces to 9 inches. The coal is poor quality but where mined was used for industrial steam raising.
Plodder mine	Ravine (Atherton)	The Plodder mine contains seams of fireclay and shales. The coal seam was 2 feet 8 inches but thicker at Newtown. It was contaminated with iron pyrites. At Sandhole Colliery the seam was liable to spontaneously combust. It was poor quality but used as steam coal.
Yard mine	Haigh Yard	The Haigh Yard seam had a height of 5 feet (1.5 m) at Tyldesley. The coal seam was divided by a dirt parting of sandstone.
Half Yard mine	Bone	This is a thin seam of coking coal with a maximum height of 20 inches.
Three Quarters mine	Smith	The Three Quarters mine had a maximum height of 2 feet (0.61 m) and was worked, where the thickness of the seam allowed, to produce coking coal. It was worked at Chew Moor, Deane Moor and Farnworth.
Arley mine	Dogshaw (Bury), Daubhill (Bolton)	The Arley mine is the deepest of the seams of the Middle Coal Measures. It outcropped at Red Moss near Blackrod where it was 2 feet (0.61 m) thick, and at Chew Moor, Westhoughton and Daubhill, Bolton. Its average thickness was 3 feet (0.91 m) to 4 feet (1.2 m). It produced excellent quality coal for coking, house and steam coal. The Arley mine was worked throughout the coalfield and around Tyldesley was a hot mine.

== Central Manchester Coalfield ==
The eastern part of the coalfield under Manchester is isolated from the rest. The sequence of coal seams corresponds more closely with that of the Oldham Coalfield than the rest of the Manchester Coalfield. Workable seams are close to the surface and coal from the deep Roger mine was considered to be of the highest quality. The Upper Coal Measures above the Worsley Four Foot mine, known as the Parker mine, are worked in this part of the coalfield and known as the Bradford Group, above which is the Ardwick Group.

The coal seams of the Bradford Group are the Two Foot, Doctor, New, Yard, Bradford Foor Foot, Three Quarters and Charlotte mines, the Charlotte being closest to the surface. The Openshaw mine above the Charlotte was worked for fireclay. Below the Bradford Group and the Parker mine are the Top, Middle and Deep mines and 60 feet (18 m) below them, the Roger mine. The Top, Middle and Deep mines correspond to the Major, Bland and Ashton Great mines in the Oldham Coalfield. The Crumbouke mine in the western coalfield is the Roger mine in central Manchester.

== See also ==
- List of collieries in Astley and Tyldesley
