= Manchester Collieries =

British coal mining company

Manchester Collieries was a coal mining company with headquarters in Walkden formed from a group of independent companies operating on the Manchester Coalfield in 1929. The Mining Industry Act 1926 attempted to stem the post-war decline in coal mining and encourage independent companies to merge in order to modernise and better survive the economic conditions of the day. Robert Burrows of the Atherton company Fletcher Burrows proposed a merger of several independent companies operating to the west of Manchester. The merger was agreed and took place in March 1929.

== Constituent companies ==
The constituent companies of Manchester Collieries in 1929 were Fletcher, Burrows and Company who owned the Howe Bridge, Gibfield and Chanters Collieries in Atherton, Andrew Knowles and Sons, the Clifton and Kersley Coal Company, John Speakman and Sons owners of Bedford Colliery in Leigh, Bridgewater Collieries who operated pits in Little Hulton, Walkden and Mosley Common and the Astley and Tyldesley Collieries Company who had pits in Astley and Tyldesley.

Not all the companies in the area joined the new company. The Tyldesley Coal Company remained independent until nationalisation in 1947 but other companies were acquired in the 1930s after the government introduced quotas in the Coal Mines Act 1930. Ramsden's Shakerley Collieries was taken over in 1935; its Wellington Pit closed the same year and the Nelson three years later. Bradford Colliery, in Bradford, Manchester, owned by a subsidiary of Fine Cotton Spinners, was acquired in 1935. The West Leigh Colliery Company and the Coppull Coal Company were bought before 1939.

Up to 1929 most coal was cut by hewers, men using picks and shovels, but Manchester Collieries began a programme of mechanisation increasing its production of machine-cut coal from 17% to 98% in 16 years. The movement of coal underground was also mechanised, and pit ponies were no longer used for underground haulage after 1932.

Mining was a dangerous industry but Manchester Collieries aimed to make the job as safe as possible, and training was a major priority. Some entrants attended local technical colleges and after 1942 some were sent to university. The company was considered to be a generous employer; workers at its pits were on average 1s 6d per shift better off than miners working for other employers, and it built pithead baths and canteens at its pits.

== Central railways ==
The collieries were linked by an extensive system of mineral lines linked to workshops at Walkden Yard. The collieries were linked to mainline railways at Ellenbrook and Sandersons Sidings on the Tyldesley Loopline, at Astley Green sidings on the Liverpool and Manchester Railway, at Walkden Low Level on the line to Bolton, at Walkden High Level on the Manchester and Wigan Railway and at Linnyshaw Moss on the Manchester to Bolton Line. There were canal tips at Boothstown and Worsley on the Bridgewater Canal.

== Nationalisation ==
At Nationalisation in 1947 Manchester Collieries employed 14,868 workers on the Lancashire Coalfield. Some of the surface workers were women, known as pit brow lasses, who sorted coal on the screens at the pit head. As coal reserves were exhausted, the older collieries closed.

| Colliery | Location | Underground workers | Surface workers |
|---|---|---|---|
| Astley Green Colliery | Astley | 1,375 | 561 |
| Nook Colliery | Tyldesley | 1,365 | 355 |
| Gin Pit Colliery | Tyldesley | 362 | 158 |
| Bedford Colliery | Leigh | 704 | 252 |
| Chanters Colliery | Hindsford | 945 | 429 |
| Gibfield Colliery | Atherton | 530 | 178 |
| Howe Bridge Colliery | Howe Bridge | 312 | 136 |
| Mosley Common Colliery No. 1 & No. 2 | Mosley Common | 978 | 406 |
| Mosley Common Colliery No. 4 | Mosley Common | 853 | 221 |
| Newtown Colliery | Clifton | 570 | 240 |
| Brackley Colliery | Little Hulton | 761 | 271 |
| Sandhole Colliery | Walkden | 725 | 335 |
| Pendlebury Colliery (Wheatsheaf) | Pendlebury | 659 | 274 |
| Bradford Colliery | Bradford, Manchester | 690 | 223 |
