= Howe Bridge Colliery =

Coordinates: 53.5153°N 2.5134°W

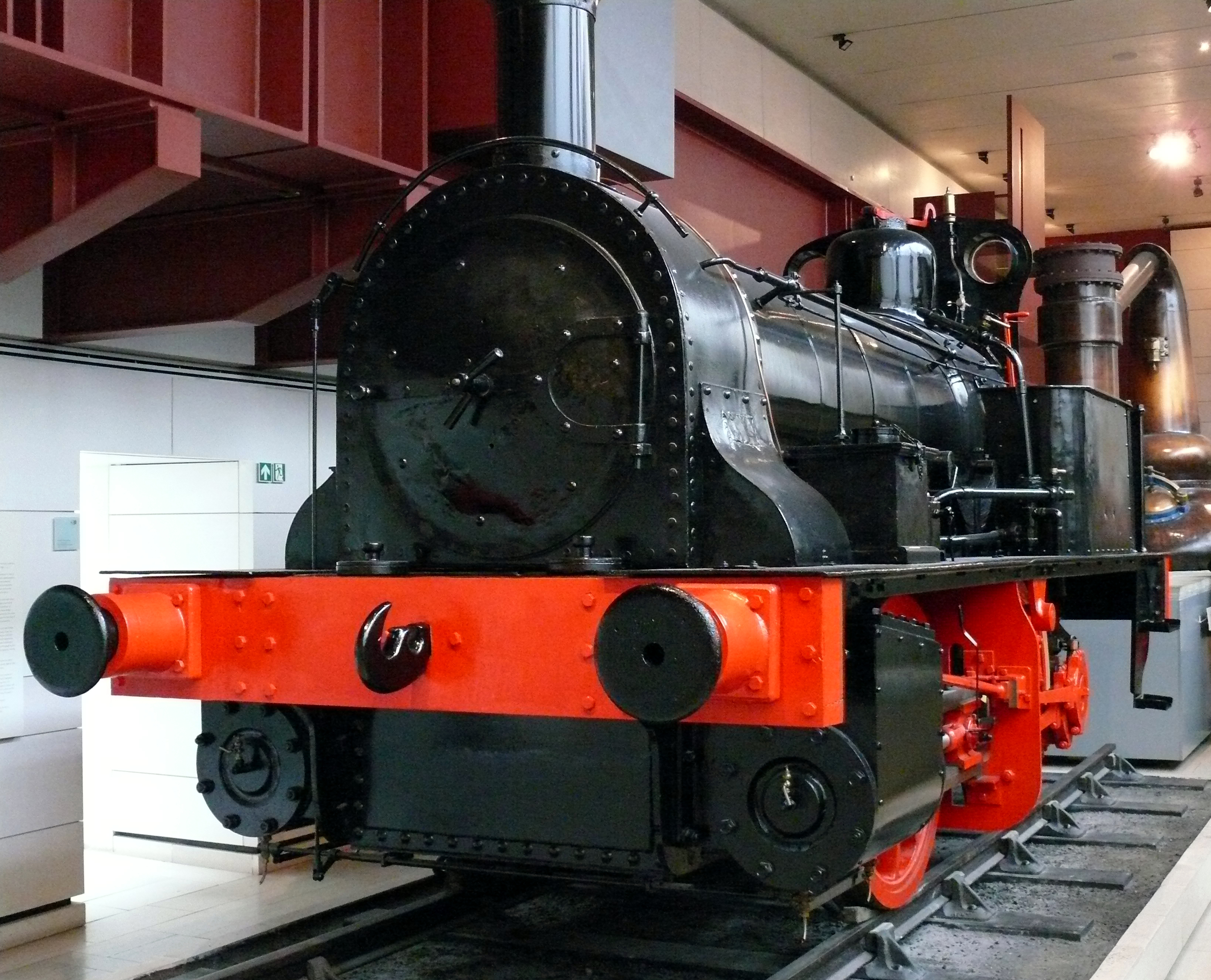
The Ellesmere locomotive, used at Howe Bridge from 1861 to 1957

Howe Bridge Colliery was a coal mine which was part of the Fletcher, Burrows and Company's collieries at Howe Bridge in Atherton, Greater Manchester, then in the historic county of Lancashire, England.

The Fletchers owned several small pits which eventually became the Howe Bridge Collieries. In 1845 Howe Bridge Collieries owned by John Fletcher sank three deep shafts to the Seven Feet mine, the Victoria pit where coal was wound was sunk to 447 feet, the Puffer for pumping water to 435 feet and the Volunteer, the upcast ventilation shaft. These last three pits were taken over by Manchester Collieries, became part of the National Coal Board in 1947 and closed in 1959.

After the pit closed Lancashire United Transport built a garage and bus repair works on the site.

== See also ==
- Glossary of coal mining terminology
- List of mining disasters in Lancashire
