= Bolton Steam Museum =

Museum in England

Coordinates: 53.5849°N 2.4546°W

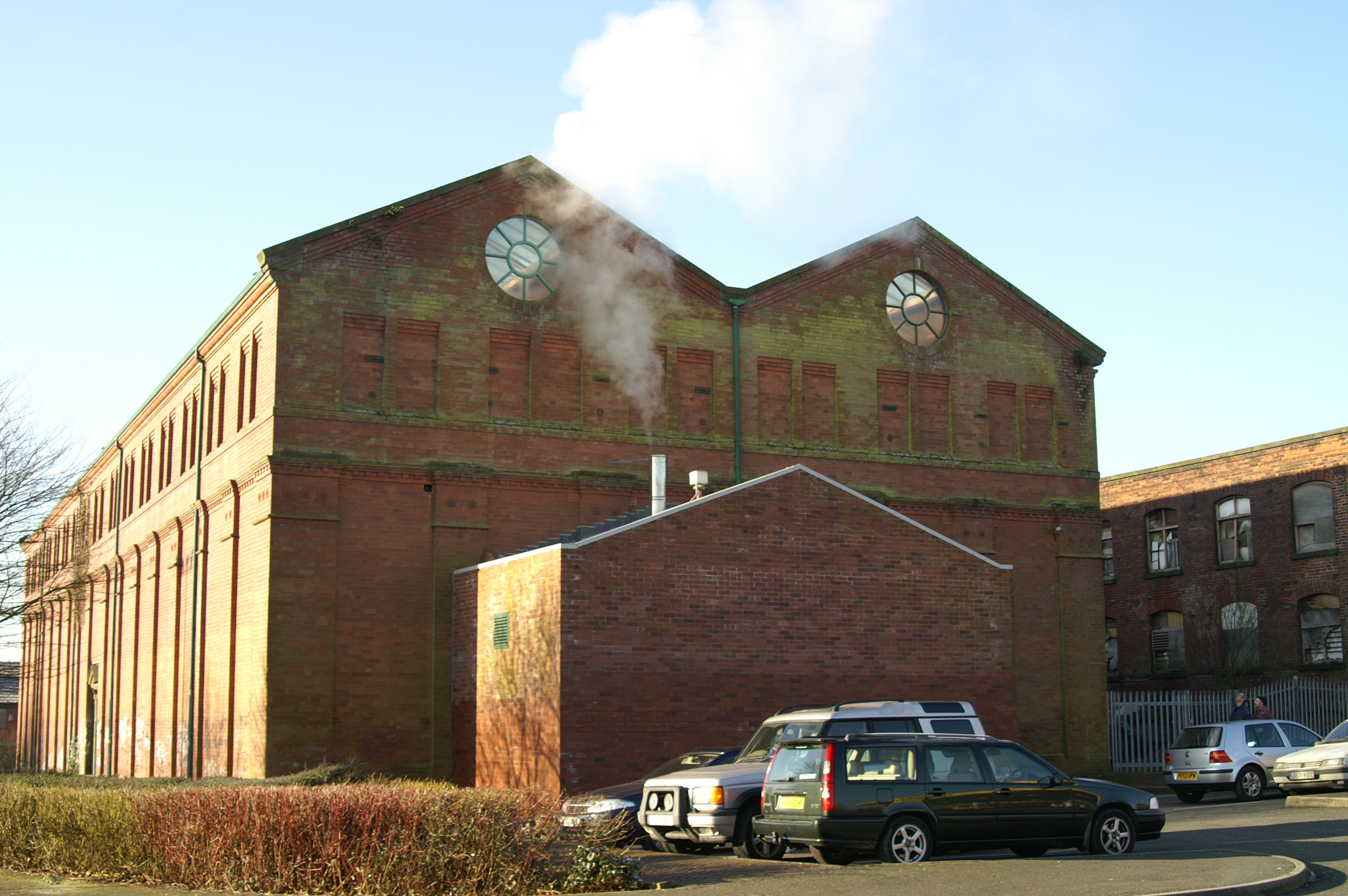
Bolton Steam Museum

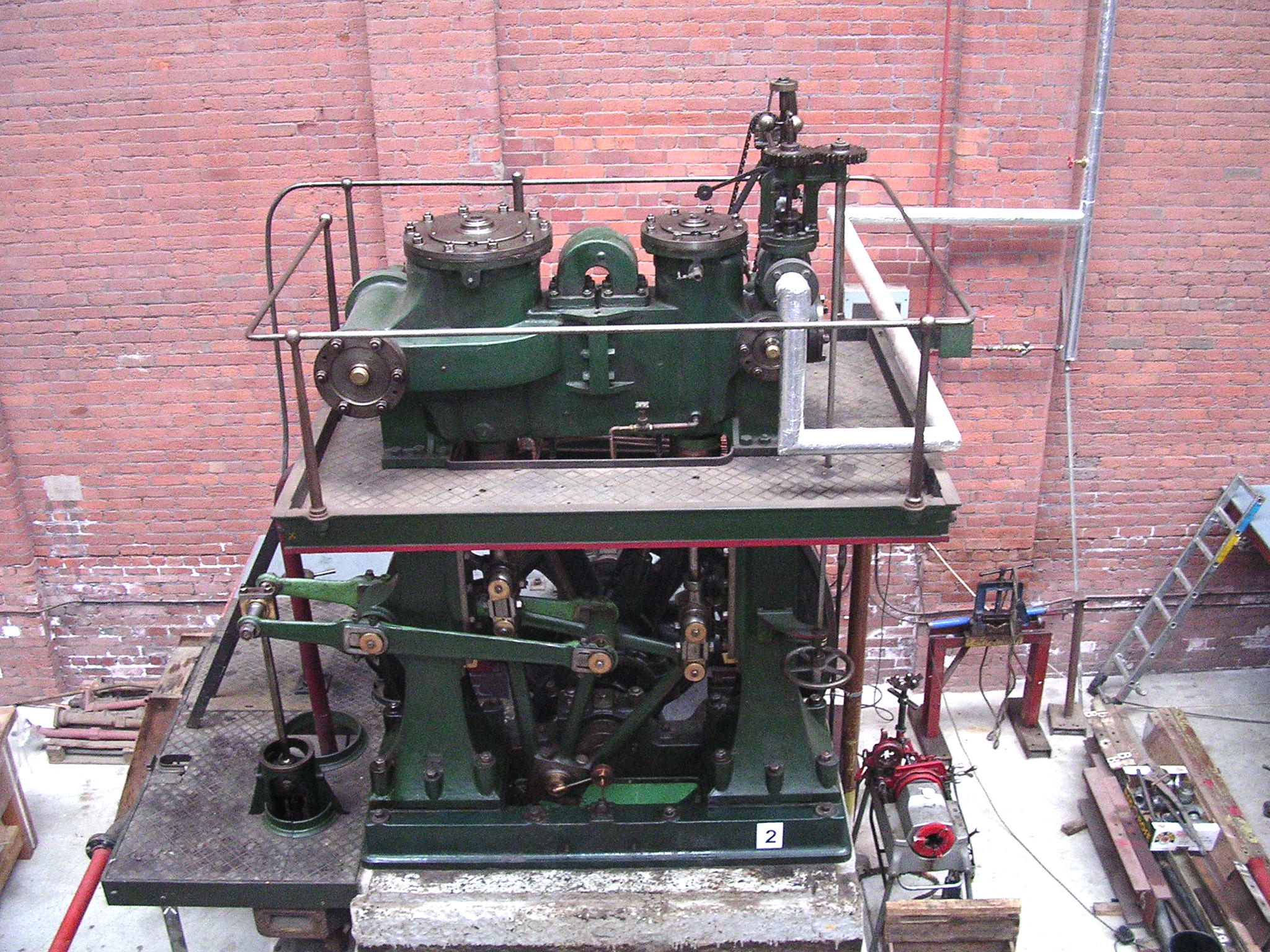
View from above the Park Street Mill non-dead-centre engine

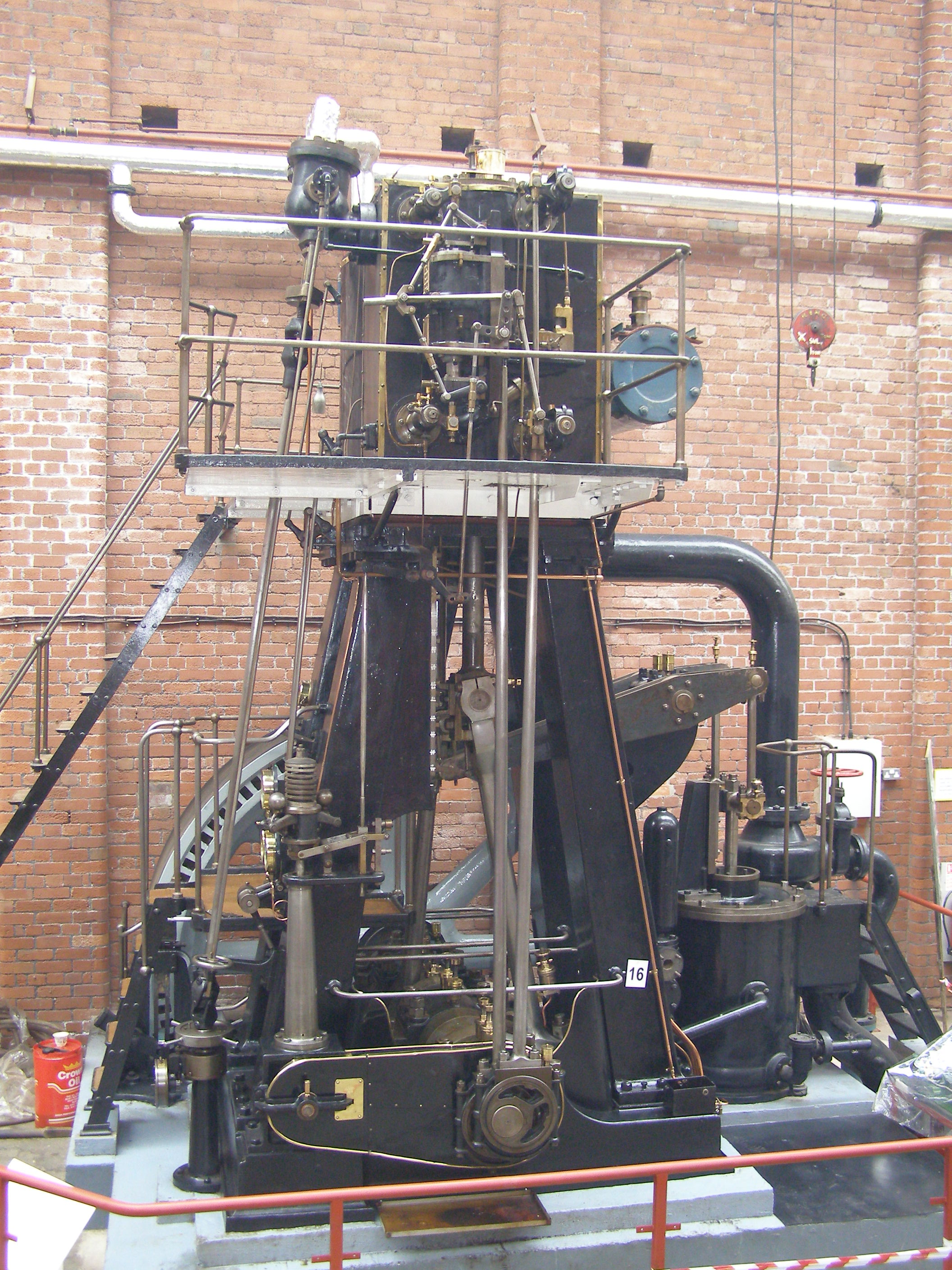
A 'prize exhibit': an inverted vertical compound engine rescued from Hardman and Ingham's Diamond Rope Works at Royton, near Oldham

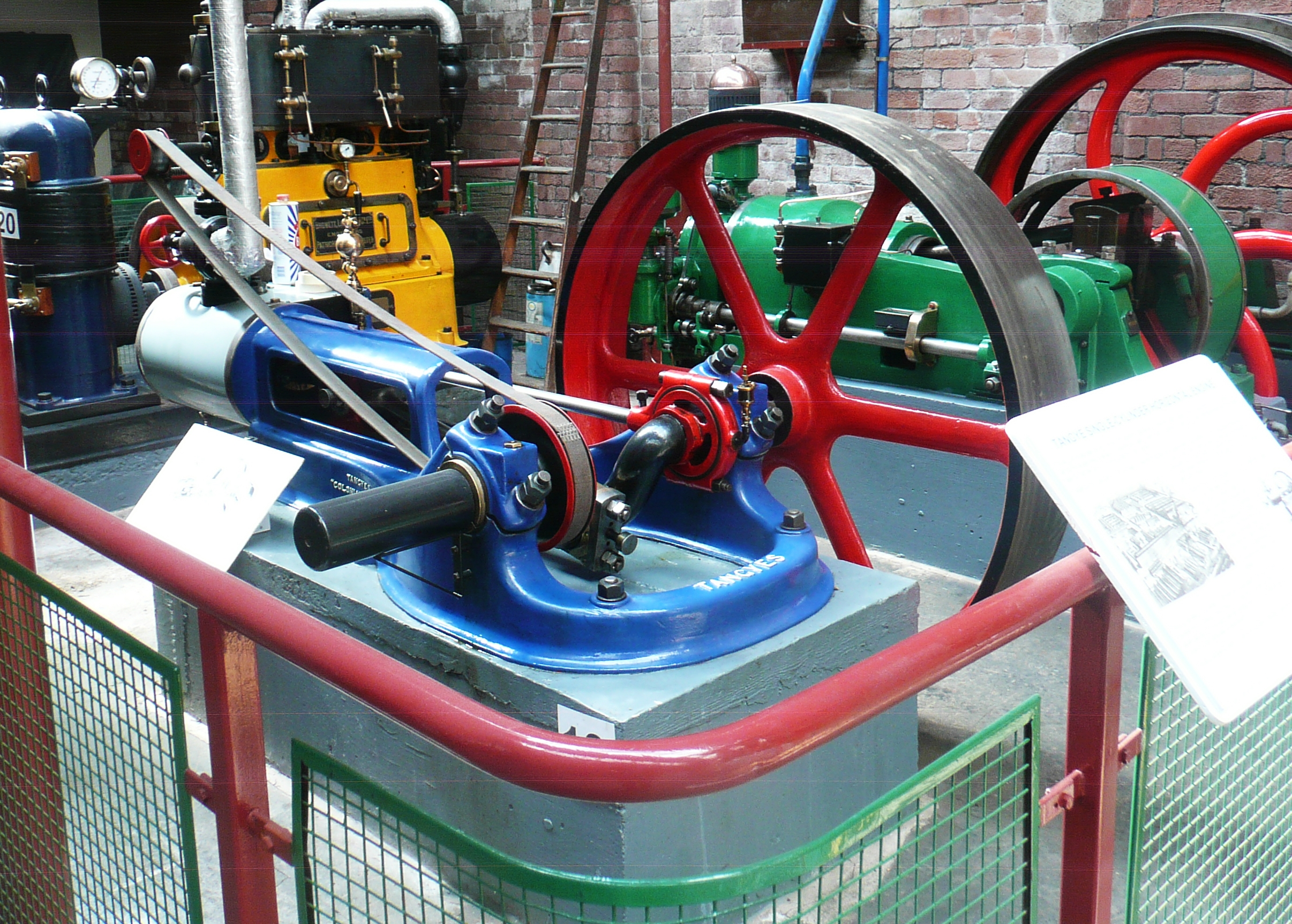
A Tangye Horizontal "Colonial " steam engine

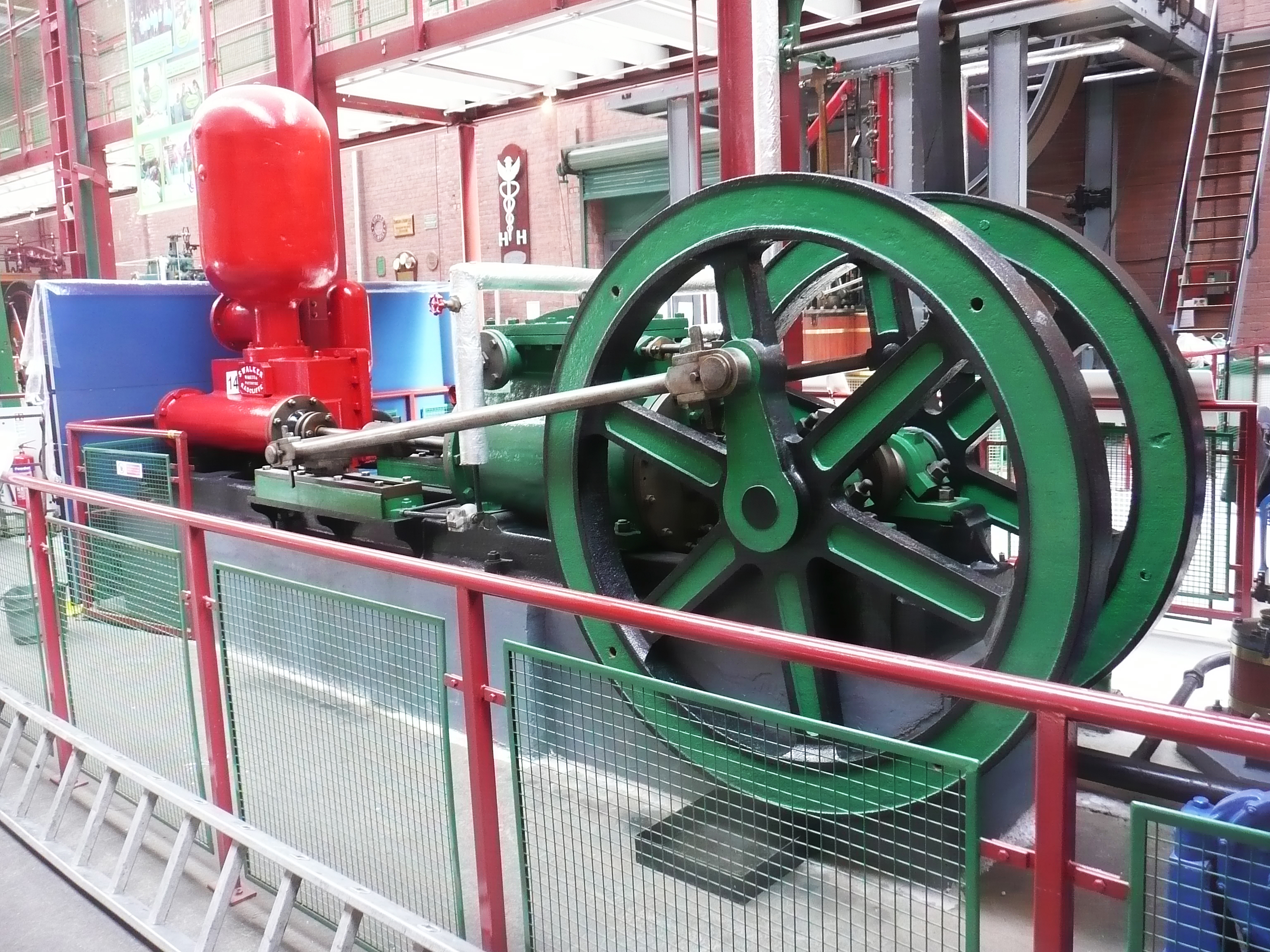
A Walkers of Radcliffe Steam Fire Pump

Bolton Steam Museum is a museum in Bolton, Greater Manchester, England, which houses a variety of preserved steam engines. Based in the cotton store of the former Atlas Mill in Mornington Road, it is owned and run by the Northern Mill Engine Society (NMES).

== Overview ==
The NMES is a registered charity (No 532259) and the museum has received Accredited Museum status from Arts Council England, the government body responsible for museums policy. The museum is open most Wednesdays and Sundays between 10 am and 2 pm when visitors can view the engines statically when volunteers are working at the museum. Special Open Days are held each year on Bank Holidays weekends when the engines are working under steam power. However, visits by genuine enthusiasts or organised groups can always be accommodated by prior arrangement. (See website). Vehicular access is via Morrisons's Supermarket car park. Parking is free for museum visitors.

== Steam engines ==
The following is a list of the mill engines that have been preserved and are on show at Bolton Steam Museum. For further details of the engine types, see steam engine.

Crossfield Mill Beam Engine

- A twin-beam engine, of unknown make, with gear drive flywheel, circa 1840, from the Crossfield Mill, Wardle, Lancashire

Wasp Mill Tandem

- A tandem compound engine with Corliss valve gear built by J & W McNaught Ltd of Rochdale in 1902 for the Wasp Mill, Wardle, Lancashire

Parks St Mill NDC

- A "non-dead-centre" inverted vertical compound engine, built by John Musgrave and Sons of Bolton in 1893, using Fleming and Ferguson patents, for Park Street Mill, Radcliffe, Lancashire

Diamond Rope Works

- An inverted vertical compound engine with Corliss valve gear built by Scott & Hodgson Ltd of Guide Bridge in 1914 for Hardman and Ingham's Diamond Rope Works, Royton, Lancashire

Cellarsclough Beam Engine

- A McNaughted compound single beam engine (originally c 1870) modified by Woodhouse and Mitchell of Brighouse in 1908 for Cellarsclough Mill, Marsden, Huddersfield, Yorkshire

Vertical cross compound

- A true vertical compound engine with central flywheel rebuilt in 1900 from earlier parts with the assistance of James Lumb of Elland and installed at Messrs Kenyon's Dearnside Mills, Denby Dale, Yorkshire

Robey Uniflow

- A single-cylinder horizontal Uniflow engine built by Robey of Lincoln in 1926, originally for the Baltic Sawmills, Ammanford, South Wales.

Robey Cross Compound

- A twin cylinder cross-compound engine built by Robey of Lincoln in 1935 for the laboratories of the University of Manchester Institute of Science and Technology.

Barraclough Vertical

- A single cylinder "A-frame" vertical engine built by Joseph Barraclough of Barnsley in circa 1860 for Redfearn's Glassworks, Barnsley, South Yorkshire.

Chadwick Vertical

- A vertical engine built by John Chadwick Ltd of Manchester, that was used to pump water in Cellarsclough Mills at Marsden

Browett & Lindley

- A high-speed compound inverted vertical engine built in 1900 by Browett, Lindley & Co of Patricroft driving an early two-pole dynamo by J H Holmes of Newcastle, from Lakefield Mill, Farnworth, Bolton

Tangye Horizontal

- A single-cylinder horizontal engine by Tangye of Birmingham from Vantona Textiles Ltd of Farnworth

Langbridge Diagonal

- A twin–cylinder diagonal engine built by Lang Bridge Ironworks of Accrington for textile printing machinery driving, from Bollington Printworks, Cheshire

Walker Fire Pump

- A single cylinder horizontal rotative fire pump engine built by Walkers of Radcliffe circa 1890 for the Fern Mill, Shaw, Lancashire

Barring engines

- Four different engines by various makers. Used to turn large mill engines into the starting position, a procedure that was originally done by "barring" the flywheel by hand. This includes an engine that was in the Bolton Museum's collection but has been transferred to this museum which is only a few yards from its original working place in Atlas No 6 Mill.

Other Engines

- A further 4 smaller steam engines of different designs by various makers and oil(diesel)and gas engines by the National Gas & Oil Engine Co of Ashton-u-Lyne

== See also ==
- Bolton Museum
