= Mosley Common Colliery =

Historic coal mine

Coordinates: 53.508°N 2.417°W

Mosley Common Colliery was a coal mine originally owned by the Bridgewater Trustees operating on the Manchester Coalfield after 1866 in Mosley Common, Greater Manchester, then in the historic county of Lancashire, England. The colliery eventually had five shafts and became the largest colliery on the Lancashire Coalfield with access to around 270 million tons of coal under the Permian rocks to the south.

== History ==
In 1862 work started at Mosley Common to sink three shafts to a depth of 500 yards in an area where coal had been mined for some time. The old workings were originally called Stonehouse Pits but the new colliery was sunk to access the deeper seams earlier mining had not reached. The sinking of the 12 feet diameter No 1 shaft encountered much water and massive pumps installed from John Musgrave & Sons in Bolton who also built the winding engine which survived until 1964.Production started in 1868 from the Crombouke mine. Some of the first miners came from other Bridgewater Trustees pits whose coal reserves were becoming exhausted. No 2 pit was sunk to 535 yards.

The shaft at No 4 pit was 18 feet 6 inches in diameter was sunk to the Trencherbone mine at 602 yards in 1881. Its winding engine was a product of the Haigh Foundry and it had a steel lattice headframe. This shaft was deepened to 1,000 yards and a Koepe tower winder was built in 1961. The upcast ventilation shaft was No 3 pit sunk to 535 yards, it had a winding engine for winding men not coal.

An electric power generating house was built in 1915 and a tall chimney for the boiler plant built in 1916. The Lancashire boilers were supplied by Galloways.

In 1923 the Mosley Common, Nos 1, 2 and 5 pits employed 1,338 underground and 198 surface workers while Nos 3 and 4 pits employed 951 underground and 143 above ground. The colliery became part of Manchester Collieries in 1929 when Bridgewater Collieries joined the company. By 1933 while part of Manchester Collieries the combined total for the pits was 1,729 underground and 489 on the surface rising to 1,711 and 531 in 1940. In 1947, at nationalisation, Mosley Common Nos 1 & 2 pits employed 978 underground and 406 surface workers while No 4 pit employed a further 853 underground and 221 on the surface.

Mosley Common Colliery was one of the country's largest and most modern pits after refurbishment and development work by the National Coal Board completed in 1962. It was turned into a "superpit" at a cost of £7.5 million and employed 3,000 workers. The colliery closed in 1968 after being set impossible production targets though its coal reserves had not been exhausted. The site was cleared by 1974.

== See also ==
- List of Collieries in Astley and Tyldesley
- Glossary of coal mining terminology
