= Gin Pit Colliery =

Coal mine in England

Coordinates: 53.5034°N 2.4695°W

Gin Pit was a coal mine operating on the Lancashire Coalfield from the 1840s in Tyldesley, Greater Manchester then in the historic county of Lancashire, England. It exploited the Middle Coal Measures of the Manchester Coalfield and was situated to the south of the Tyldesley Loopline.

== History ==
Gin Pit's name suggests it, or a predecessor, had horse driven winding gear and was on the site of even older coal workings. The colliery, owned by John Darlington, was isolated from roads resulting in the building of a narrow gauge tramway worked by horses to transport coal from the pit to the Bridgewater Canal at Marsland Green. In 1851 Darlington attempted to sell his colliery, tramroad, cranes and tipplers on the canal to the Bridgewater Trustees but the operation was sold to Samuel Jackson, a salt merchant and owner of a nearby colliery in Bedford. The colliery's single shaft was deepened to the Rams mine at 375 yards between 1866 and 1872 by Astley and Tyldesley Coal and Salt Company. It had a pumping engine built by the Haigh Foundry.

In 1896 Gin Pit employed 240 underground and 55 surface workers producing household and steam coal and coal to produce gas. The seams worked were the Crombouke and Six Foot mines. In 1923 the colliery had 237 underground and 57 surface workers. In common with many collieries on the Lancashire Coalfield, women, known as Pit brow lasses were employed on the surface to sort coal on the screens at the pit head. The colliery was linked to St George's Colliery for ventilation.

The colliery became part of Manchester Collieries in 1929. In 1947 when the collieries were nationalised Gin Pit became part of the No 1 Manchester Area of the National Coal Board's (NCB) North Western Division. It ceased production in 1958.

The surface structures of the colliery were all removed ahead of residential development in the early 2000s. An archaeological study was done by Oxford Archaeology North in 2005-2007 uncovering the remains of the Heapstead (the area at the top of the mineshaft, also known as the 'pit brow' or 'pit bank') these were recognised as a rare surviving example of the type in 2003.

== Boat building ==
Gin Pit also had a boat building operation. The narrow wooden box boats were taken to the canalside at Marsland Green by rail.

== Legacy ==
Gin Pit Village is a small settlement which is still inhabited, and the miners' welfare club is still open.

A time capsule was buried by the Mayor of Wigan in 2003. After ten years of fund raising the Gin Pit A half pit wheel from Clipstone Colliery in Nottinghamshire was installed on the village green in 2013.

== See also ==
- List of Collieries in Astley and Tyldesley
- Glossary of coal mining terminology

== Bibliography ==
- Hayes, Geoffrey (2004), Collieries and their Railways in the Manchester Coalfields, Landmark, ISBN 1-84306-135-X
- Townley, C. H. A.; Appleton, C. A.; Smith, F. D.; Peden, J. A. (1995), The Industrial railways of Bolton, Bury and the Manchester Coalfield, Part Two, The Manchester Coalfield, Runpast, ISBN 1-870754-32-8
