= Lancashire Coalfield =

Coal mining region in England

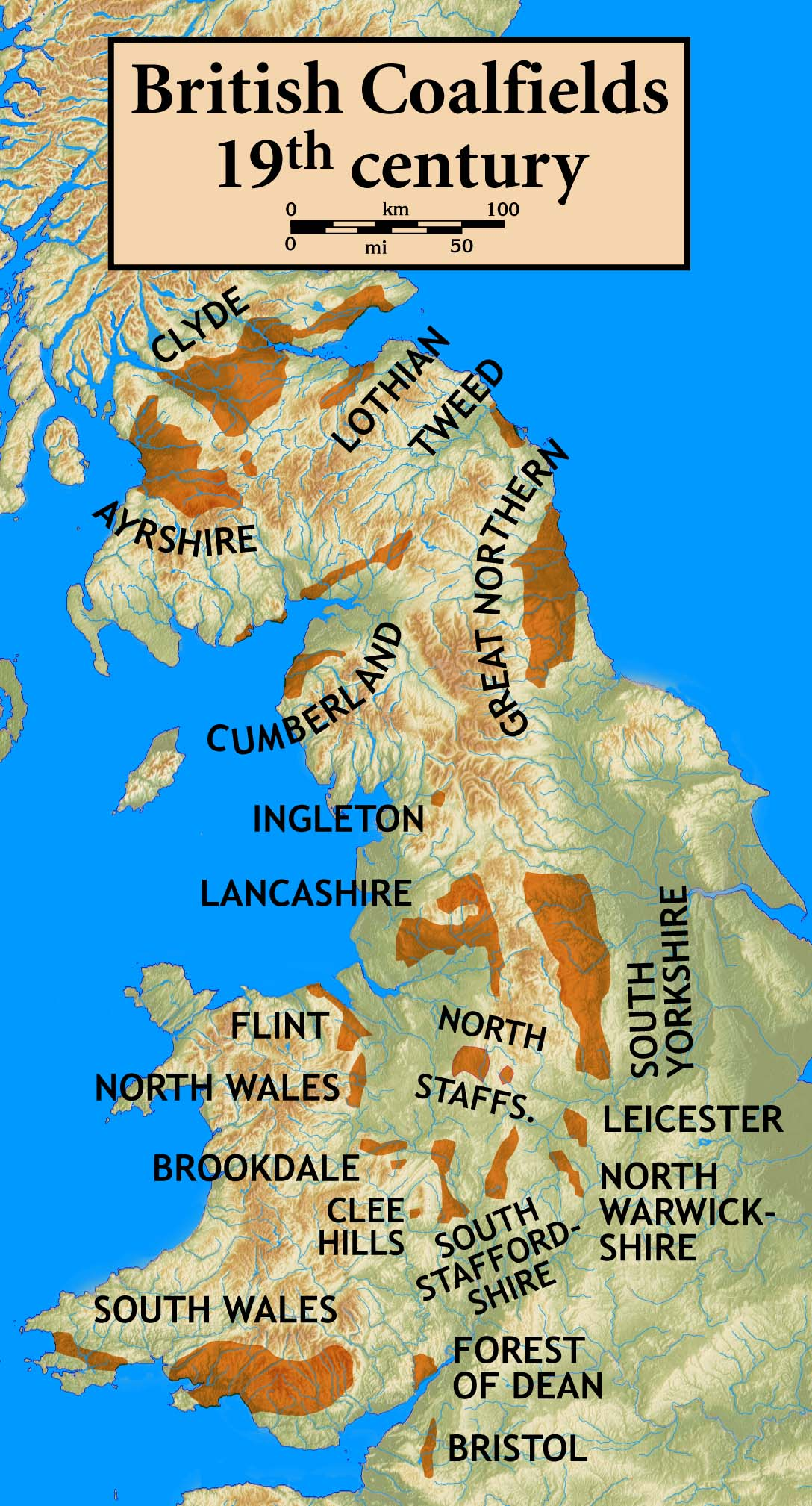
British Coalfields

The Lancashire Coalfield in North West England was an important British coalfield. Its coal seams were formed from the vegetation of tropical swampy forests in the Carboniferous period over 300 million years ago.

The Romans may have been the first to use coal in Lancashire and its shallow seams and outcrops were exploited on a small scale from the Middle Ages and extensively after the start of the Industrial Revolution. The coalfield was at the forefront of innovation in coal mining, prompting the country's first canals, use of steam engines and creating conditions favourable for rapid industrialisation.

The pits on the coalfield were at their most productive in 1907 when more than 26 million tons of coal were produced. By 1967 just 21 collieries remained. Parkside Colliery in Newton-le-Willows, St. Helens area, the last deep mine to be sunk on the coalfield, was closed in 1993.

== Geology ==
The geology of the coalfield consists of the coal seams of the Upper, Middle and Lower Coal Measures, layers of sandstones, shales and coal of varying thickness, which were laid down in the Carboniferous period over 300 million years ago. The coal seams were formed from the vegetation of tropical swampy forests. The coal in Lancashire is bituminous, with 30–40% volatile matter varying in hardness from seam to seam.

The coal measures were subsequently subjected to folding; this accounts for the dip towards the south and west; faulting occurred at that time. The Coal Measures are over 1200 metres (4000 ft)) thick, and coal accounts for about 4% of their thickness. The coalfield is crossed by several major faults, which generally run in a north and south direction. The most significant easterly fault described by Edward Hull throws the strata down to the east. It was worked from Fairbottom in Ashton-under-Lyne across the River Medlock to Oldham and onwards to the west of Rochdale. The Red Rock Fault skirts the north-west extremity of the North Staffordshire coalfield towards Macclesfield and Poynton Colliery in Cheshire. The Irwell Valley or Pendleton Fault passes Clifton and Kearsley, where it throws the coal measures down to the north-east. It has a throw of 3000 feet (900 metres) and the area is still geologically active and subject to earth tremors. A fault with a large horizontal but small vertical throw is found at Tyldesley. In the deep mines (Note: In Lancashire a coal seam is referred to as a mine and the coal mine as a colliery or pit.) at the southern edge of the coalfield, the Plodder mine in Leigh and the Arley mine in Tyldesley were hot: the miners worked in temperatures of over 100 degrees Fahrenheit (38 °C).

Five substantial faults affect the Wigan Coalfield; they run nearly parallel to and equidistant from each other. The Great Haigh Fault begins near Bickershaw Colliery and passes northward through Hindley, Kirkless Hall, Haigh, and Arley to the west of Adlington Park. The Great Standish or St Catherine's Fault has a downthrow to the east and passes under St Catherine's Church at Ince. The Giant's Hall Fault passes by Abram, west of Ince Hall Colliery, west of Gidlow and under Giant's Hall Farm to Standish Church. The Great Shevington Fault passes by Hawkley Hall and east of Kirkless Hall. The Great Pemberton Fault is a downthrow and passes Pemberton, Orrell and to the west of Shevington. Further west are the Great Upholland Fault, the Lathom Fault the Great Boundary Fault stretching from Bickerstaffe to about two miles (3.2 km) east of Ormskirk.

== Geography ==
The coalfield on the western side of the Pennines is divided into two parts separated by the Rossendale anticline. To the north-east is the Burnley Coalfield and to the south is the much larger South Lancashire Coalfield which comprises, from west to east, the St Helens, Wigan, Manchester, and Oldham Coalfields. The Oldham Coalfield extends to the south and becomes the Cheshire Coalfield. The coalfield covers around 550 square miles (1,400 km^{2}) extending from Stalybridge in the southeast to Ormskirk in the northwest and from Rainhill in the southwest to beyond Burnley in the northeast. The south eastern part extends well into neighbouring Cheshire where significant mining took place around Poynton and Dukinfield. The area of the coalfield became heavily industrialised as new industries developed, attracted by the availability of fuel. A small area around Todmorden in West Yorkshire is geologically part of the coalfield. The redrawing of administrative county boundaries in 1974 resulted in almost all the South Lancashire Coalfield lying outside the modern-day boundaries of Lancashire. A quite separate and much smaller coalfield is situated in the Wenning valley in the northeast of the county but is referred to as a part of the Ingleton Coalfield, the main part of which is in North Yorkshire.

== History ==
It is possible that the Romans were the first to use coal in Lancashire, but the earliest written record of "minera" was made in 1246 when Adam de Radcliffe stole coal belonging to Adam son of Alexander. Small amounts of coal were dug during the Middle Ages, but wood was plentiful and turf was preferred to coal which was inferior in quality. It was however used for lime burning and by smiths. Coal was got in Shakerley in 1429 when a dispute over the stealing of "seacoals" was recorded, and in 1521 there is a record of coal mines in Whiston. Most pits were very small and shallow, and Wigan and its neighbourhood were noted for having numerous cannel pits which families could access from under their property. John Leland visited Haigh in 1538 and observed that "Mr Bradshaw ... hath founde moche Canel like Se coal in his grounde very profitable to him." (Note: Mr Bradshaw has found much cannel coal in his land which was very profitable.) Mining was not a full-time occupation: frequently the work was seasonal and combined with other occupations such as farming or weaving.

During the Elizabethan era there were pits throughout the coalfield, and mines were recorded at Haslingden, Padiham, Ightenhill and Trawden. Over 50 small collieries operated around Rochdale where coal was got from small pits from the 1580s at Falinge, Cronkeyshaw and near Littleborough. Landowners entered into disputes with their tenants and neighbours, some of which were violent. Shallow pits at Bradford, a little over a mile from Manchester town centre, produced enough coal for the town in the early 1600s.

Different areas of the coalfield expanded and contracted at different times. The Wigan area, with coal relatively close to the surface, was important by the 18th century, fuelling the brass and pewter industries; and after the onset of the Industrial Revolution, cotton and heavy engineering. The coalfield around St Helens developed from the mid-18th century supplying the copper, glass and chemical industries that developed close to the Sankey Canal.

In the 1770s records show that there were pits in Wigan, Bolton, Oldham, Ashton-under-Lyne and Dukinfield. From the 16th and 17th centuries some landowners began to develop the industry, and several dynasties of coalowners emerged. These included the Bradshaws and subsequently the Earls of Crawford and Balcarres of Haigh Hall, the Hultons of Hulton Park, the Fletchers, the Knowles and the Duke of Bridgewater and his successors the Bridgewater Trustees. More companies emerged during the 19th century and included Richard Evans and Company of Haydock, which originated in 1830. Pearson and Knowles Coal and Iron Company was formed in 1874 in Ince. Colonel John Hargreaves began a company with pits in Burnley, and George Hargreaves owned pits in Accrington and Rossendale Valley. James Lees' Chamber Colliery Company owned pits in Oldham.

=== Drainage ===
In 1600 the collieries were drifts where coal outcropped, and shallow bell or ladder pits where roof falls were common and poor drainage led to them being abandoned. As a solution to water in his coal pits, Roger Bradshaw dug the Great Haigh Sough between 1653 and 1670. It was a 1,120 yards (1,020 m) long tunnel under his Haigh Hall estate which drained the pits into a nearby stream and was still in use until 1929. Other soughs were dug, including one in 1729 to drain the Worsley mines and another from Standish Colliery to the Leeds and Liverpool Canal at Crooke. A waterwheel was used from 1720 to lift water from the workings of the Plumbe Street Mine in Burnley using an endless chain of buckets, and James Brindley installed one at the Wet Earth Colliery in the Irwell Valley.

The invention of steam engines, first in 1698 by Thomas Savery and then in 1711 by Thomas Newcomen, provided an alternative method of draining wet mines and winding men and coal from deeper mines. A Newcomen atmospheric engine was installed at Bardsley Colliery in Ashton-under-Lyne in about 1760. It was known as Fairbottom Bobs and is preserved in the Henry Ford Museum in Dearborn, Michigan.

=== Transport ===
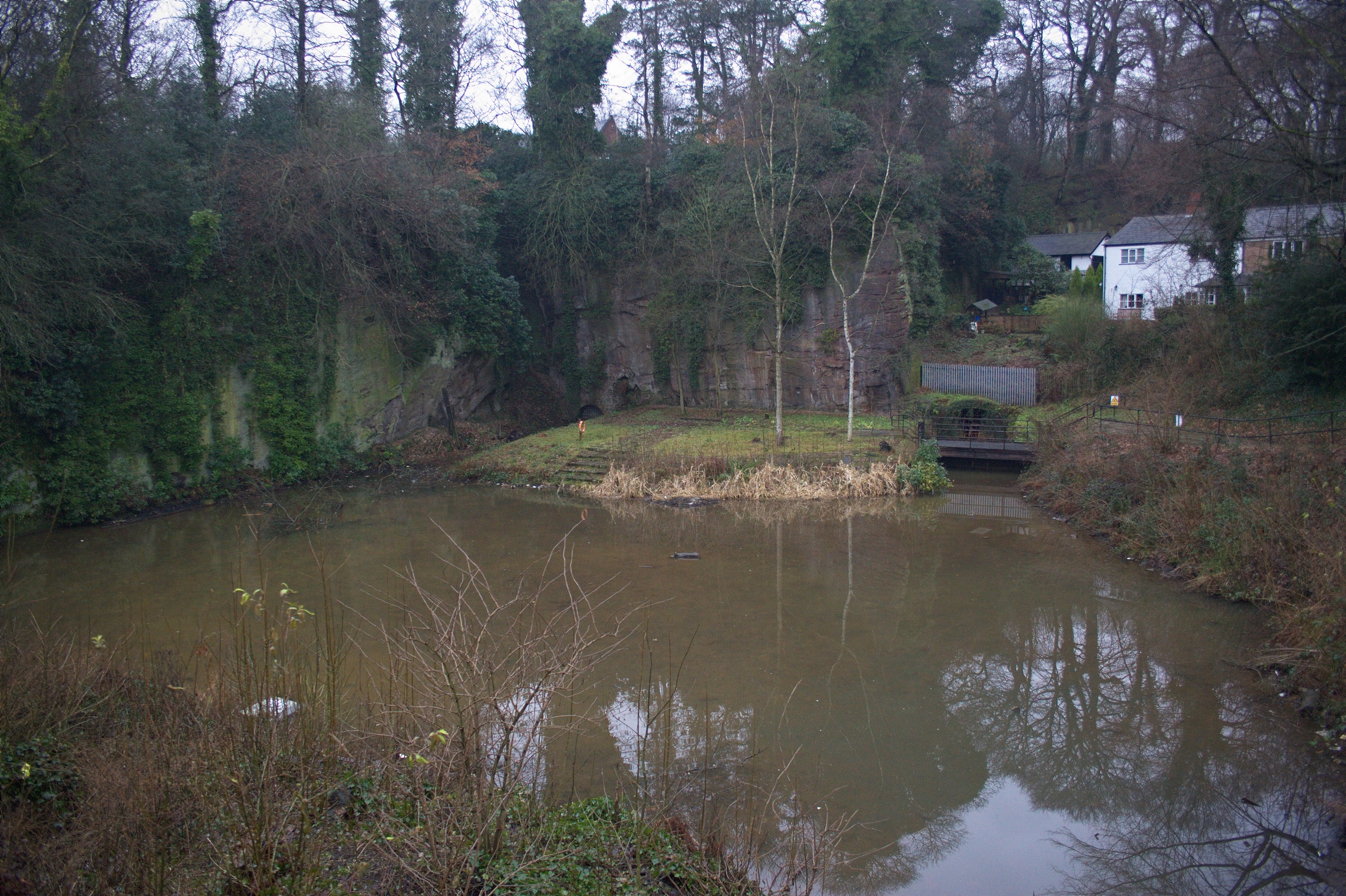
Worsley Delph, the entrance to the Duke of Bridgewater's underground mines

Transport of coal was difficult; roads were poor and carting heavy loads made them worse. In 1720 the River Douglas near Wigan and the rivers Irwell and Mersey were made navigable, providing a more efficient and cheaper method of transporting coal. The Sankey Canal was built in 1755 and by 1760 Francis Egerton, 3rd Duke of Bridgewater was constructing the Bridgewater Canal, providing a direct link from his mines, the Worsley Navigable Levels, into Manchester. This encouraged the development of more canals, including the Leeds and Liverpool and Manchester Bolton & Bury Canals.

William Hulton was a supporter of the Bolton and Leigh Railway, Lancashire's first public railway, opened in 1828 to carry coal and cotton. The railway passed to the west of his Hulton estate and gave his pits at Chequerbent access to the new means of transport. In the following 20 years the main lines of the railway system were constructed, linking the increasingly industrial towns in Lancashire with the rest of the country. Access to transport, the steam engine, the development of the textile industry with raw cotton imported through the Port of Liverpool and associated industries as the Industrial Revolution gathered pace. This led to increased demand for coal and larger, deeper mines.

=== Ventilation ===
Providing fresh air and removing firedamp from pits with a single shaft was a problem as explosive gases accumulated. An early solution was to send a collier or fireman, swathed in wet rags and armed with a long pole with a lighted candle, into the workings to explode any accumulated gases before work began; this did not always work. At Haigh in 1688 it was recorded that "the fiery damp went off twice, but did little hurt". (Note: the firedamp exploded twice, but did little damage) A system of coursed air circulation in the workings was introduced in the 1760s using walls and doors, leading to the employment of "trappers", children as young as six or seven, working in darkness, who opened and closed the doors.

The air flow was improved by braziers or fire baskets suspended in the shaft, and by the late 1700s underground furnaces, in combination with stoppings and doors. These methods were not without danger from fires or explosions.

=== Conditions ===
At the turn of the 19th century demand for coal increased rapidly for domestic and industrial consumption: steam was used to power factories and steamships. Miners worked in intolerable conditions. Coal was got by hand, hewers using picks and shovels in mines lit by candles. Children as young as five sat in complete darkness opening ventilation doors for "hurriers", women and boys who hauled tubs of coal to the shaft bottom. Some coalowners used bonds, paying signing-on fees to the colliers who worked in their coal pits for a year or had to pay a considerable forfeit if the contract was broken. The coalowners used the bond system as a tool for enforcing discipline and preventing the workers from unionizing. The Combination Act 1799 made unions illegal. Some coal owners, including William Hulton, paid their workers with tokens or vouchers that could only be redeemed in their company shops, a practice outlawed by the Truck Act 1831. Wages were poor and coal owners introduced a system of fines to enforce discipline. The Duke of Bridgewater paid eight shillings (40p) for a six-day working week with shifts of 12 to 15 hours and fined those who were late half a crown. The wages amounted to a few pence more than given in Poor Law relief and miners worked to keep out of the workhouse. William Hulton reputedly paid the poorest wages in Lancashire and was hostile to permitting his workforce the right to free assembly.

The Mines and Collieries Act 1842 prohibited the employment of women and girls and boys under the age of ten to work underground in coal mines. Many women were employed underground in Lancashire and after the passing of the act some continued for a time, as there were few inspectors of mines and employers turned a blind eye. After 1842 many women continued to work at the pits but on the surface, sorting coal from dirt on the coal screens, as pit brow lasses. More women were employed in this capacity in Lancashire than on any other coalfield.

=== 20th century ===
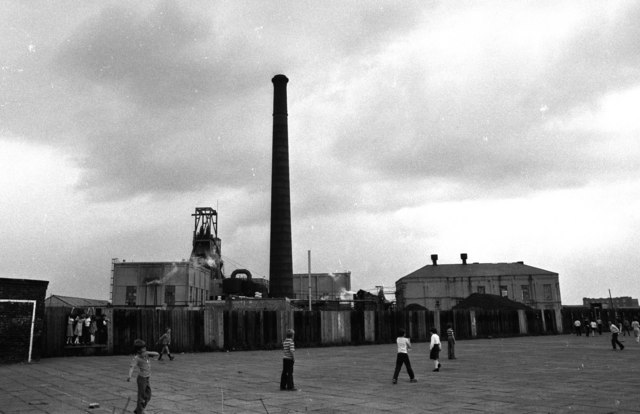
Parsonage Colliery in 1980

In 1907 there were 358 collieries and coal was produced largely by hand and pit ponies used for haulage in some pits. The highest annual tonnage was produced in 1907 at over 26 million tons. During the first quarter of the 20th century an average of nearly 20 million tons of coal was produced annually by a workforce of 100,000 men. Conditions became increasingly difficult as the best, most easily won coal was worked out in mines that were deep and hot. It became more difficult for Lancashire to compete with the more easily worked mines in Yorkshire and Derbyshire. In the Burnley area output from the thin seams towards the north of the coalfield was small. Despite its higher price Lancashire coal remained important. The consumption of the coalfield was largely for a local market but some was shipped abroad. Manchester was the centre of a vast industrial district and there was a great demand for coal from the cotton industry and other textile manufacturers, engineering, iron and chemical works, and a variety of other industries. There was demand for coke in the foundries and coke-ovens were built next to some larger collieries, steam coal was required for the cotton mills, chemical works, engineering works, and for locomotive fuel, house coal had a large market in a heavily populated area.

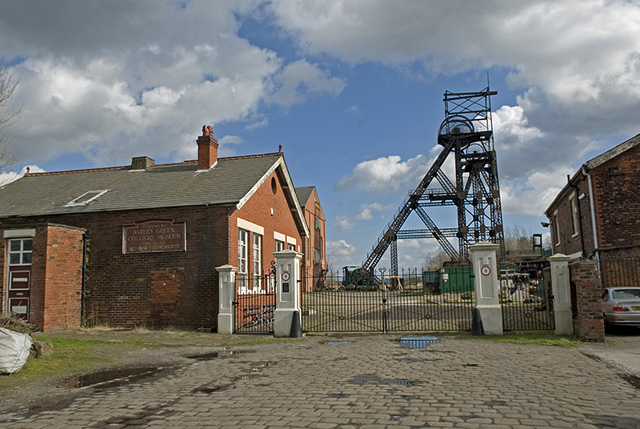
Astley Green Colliery, offices and headgear

After the First World War, demand for coal declined: Britain had lost export markets and productivity had fallen. In 1925 coal owners attempted to reduce wages and impose longer working hours to try to maintain profits. A wages subsidy by the Conservative government postponed industrial action, but, after a Royal Commission reported in 1926, the subsidy was withdrawn and mine owners issued new pay and conditions lengthening the working day and cutting wages. By refusing to accept the terms miners were locked out of the pits. The strike lasted from May to September and miners gained nothing, and some were not re-employed.

In 1927 there were 222 working collieries in Lancashire belonging to 125 owners. The 18 pits in Cheshire had 15 owners. Most companies were small: over 100 pits had fewer than 200 workers while 60 pits employed more than 200, 14 employed between 1,000 and 2,000, and 18 more than 2,000 workers.

The Mining Industries Act of 1925 attempted to stem the post-war decline and encouraged independent companies to merge in order to modernise and better survive the economic conditions of the day. Robert Burrows of the Atherton company, Fletcher Burrows proposed a merger of several companies operating to the west of Manchester and merger was agreed and took place in March 1929 forming Manchester Collieries, the largest such company on the coalfield.

=== Nationalisation ===
On the vesting date, 1 January 1947, the remaining coal mines were nationalised, taken into public ownership, and the service contracts of the employees transferred to the National Coal Board (NCB). In total 86 collieries were nationalised and the coalfield divided into four areas, Manchester with 20 pits, Wigan had 26, St Helens 22 and 18 in Burnley and the number of collieries continued to decline as reserves became exhausted.

In order to maximise coal output, short-life drift mines including Fence Drift and Wood End Drift were opened near Burnley and Seneley Hall Drift at Standish and Dairy Pit at Haigh in the early 1950s. At the same time, the NCB embarked on an extensive programmes of boring to prove the reserves of coal, and modernised existing collieries. In the late 1950s some smaller collieries were closed in the Wigan and Burnley areas as was Deane Colliery in Bolton.

Production at the reopened Agecroft Colliery resumed in 1960, and by 1962 major investment was made to turn Mosley Common Colliery into a "superpit" at a cost of £7.5 million. The last completely new coal mine to be sunk on the coalfield was Parkside Colliery in Newton-le-Willows. Sinking to the Crombouke and Lower Florida seams at a depth of 886 yards started in 1957 and production began in 1964. The colliery employed 1,400 men.

=== End of deep mining ===
In the 1960s the NCB began closing collieries, some with workable coal reserves, by setting impossible production targets and by 1967 just 21 pits remained. The Mosley Common superpit closed in 1968 and Astley Green closed in 1970, both had huge reserves of coal. The remaining collieries closed after the 1984 miners' strike, Bold Colliery in St Helens closed in 1985, Agecroft in 1991 and the Bickershaw, Golborne, Parsonage complex a year later. Parkside Colliery, the last deep mine on the coalfield, closed in 1993 without exhausting its coal reserves.

== Mining disasters ==
The "gassy" coal seams, poor ventilation and the use of candles meant the coalfield was prone to explosions and, between 1851 and 1853, had the highest mortality rate of any British coalfield. In 1850, 16 men and boys died at Bent Grange Colliery in Oldham, 36 died at Coppull Colliery in 1852 and in two disasters within a year at Ince Hall Colliery, 58 died in 1853 and 89 men died in 1854. In 1883 some 68 men and boys were killed and 53 were injured at Moorfield colliery near Accrington.

Mining was dangerous: flooding, gases, roof falls and explosions of firedamp contributed to the deaths of thousands of workers in Lancashire's pits. In the first half of the 19th century there were many disasters, many caused by firedamp and inadequate ventilation. In the year 1859 there were 68 fatal accidents in Manchester district and 57 in Wigan and St Helens. The third worst mining disaster in the country was at Hulton Colliery Company's Pretoria Pit in 1910 when a faulty lamp caused an explosion killing 344 miners.

In 1962 16 men died and 21 were injured at Hapton Valley colliery near Burnley. The last disaster on the coalfield was at Golborne Colliery in March 1979, when three men died instantly in an explosion of methane caused by an electrical spark and seven men later died of their injuries.

Boothstown Mines Rescue Station was opened by the Lancashire and Cheshire Coalowners in 1933 close to the East Lancashire Road. It replaced four smaller stations and was permanently staffed by two rescue teams who attended emergencies across the entire coalfield.

== Unions ==
The colliery owners fended off the formation of unions until well into the 19th century and trade unionism was slow to take a hold on the coalfield. The employers arbitrarily fined men for minor reasons, disallowed wages on false pretexts and victimised perceived radicals. Bonds were used to enforce discipline. Miners protested about poor wages in 1757 when bread prices rose and some marched from Kersall towards Manchester in protest but were turned back. When trouble flared, the Home Secretary ordered troops to be ready to quell the unrest. Long strikes were unsustainable as the miners had no organisation or finances to back them up. The first miners' association was the "Brotherly Union Society" formed in Pemberton in 1794. It was described as a friendly society to avoid prosecution under the Combination Acts and in the early 19th century there were 21 such societies in central Lancashire. The Lancashire and Cheshire Miners' Federation (LCMF) was founded in 1881 and after the formation of the National Union of Mineworkers in 1945, the LCMF became its Lancashire area. Though not considered militant, the union was involved in several strikes including the national strikes of 1926, 1972, 1974 and 1984.

== Invention and innovation ==
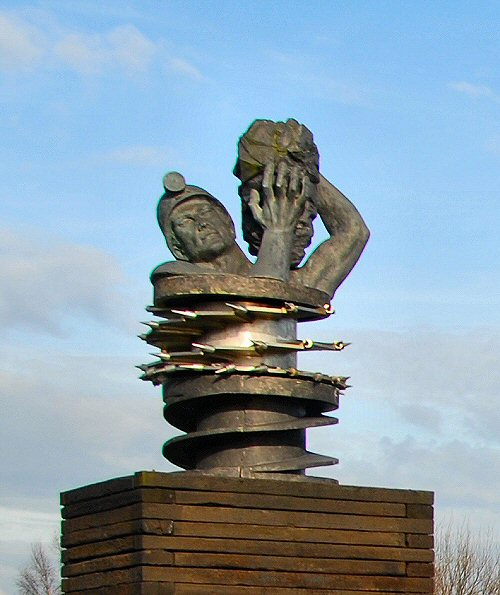
Monument to James Anderton OBE, inventor of the power shearer, sited in St.Helens

Lancashire was at the forefront of innovation in coal mining from James Brindley's 1756 water wheel at Wet Earth Colliery to the Duke of Bridgewaters's underground canals. Edward Ormerod patented a "Butterfly" safety link to improve cage safety in 1867 that is used globally. Lancashire had the first pithead baths in the country at Gibfield Colliery in Atherton and the first mines rescue station to cover an entire coalfield at Howe Bridge in 1908. The Anderton Shearer Loader invented by James Anderton and first commissioned at Ravenhead Colliery, Sutton, St Helens, produced more than half the total output of British coal in the 1960s.

== Legacy ==
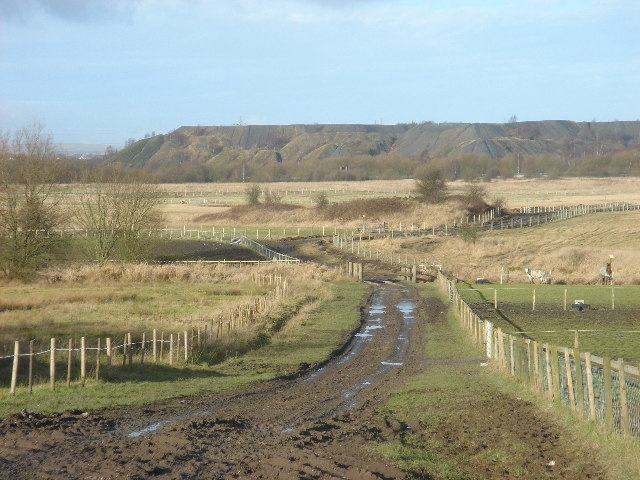
Spoil heaps or "rucks" at Wharton Hall Colliery, Little Hulton

There can be no doubt that coal mining substantially changed the landscape. The Victoria County History has several disparaging descriptions of the Wigan area in the early 20th century.

Hindley lies in the centre of the great Lancashire coalfield, and consists of a level-surfaced country dotted over with collieries and black pit-banks. A close network of tramways and railways covers the face of a singularly dreary stretch of country, where the pastures are scanty and blackened. Frequent pools of water lie between the collieries, indicating subsidences of the earth caused by mining. What trees remain standing appear as dead stumps, with leafless branches reflected weirdly in the 'flashes' of water.

Coal mining has left areas of derelict land and spoil heaps or "rucks" across the coalfield. Some reclamation has taken place often after opencasting. Subsidence had resulted in "flashes" or shallow lakes some of which have been landscaped for recreational use such as the Three Sisters at Ashton in Makerfield and Pennington Flash Country Parks in Leigh. The Astley Green Colliery Museum and Gin Pit Miners Welfare in Tyldesley are two of the last tangible reminders of the once thriving industry.

== See also ==
- List of collieries in Lancashire since 1854
- Glossary of coal mining terminology
- List of mining disasters in Lancashire
- Lancashire and Cheshire Miners' Permanent Relief Society
