= Howe Bridge railway station =

Railway station in England (1864–1959)

Howe Bridge

General information
- Location: Howe Bridge, Atherton, Wigan; England
- Coordinates: 53.5182°N 2.5052°W
- Grid reference: SD665025
- Platforms: 2

Other information
- Status: Disused

History
- Original company: London and North Western Railway
- Pre-grouping: London and North Western Railway
- Post-grouping: London Midland and Scottish Railway

Key dates
- 1 September 1864: Station opened as Chowbent
- 1901: Renamed Howe Bridge
- 20 July 1959: Station closed
Location

Howe Bridge railway station, originally Chowbent station, is a former railway station in Atherton, Greater Manchester. It was situated within the historic county of Lancashire.

== History ==
The station at Howe Bridge, in common with other stations on the Manchester to Wigan Line, was opened by the London and North Western Railway on 1 September 1864. At a junction to the west of Tyldesley railway station, the line to Wigan North Western railway station headed north west via Chowbent, Hindley and Platt Bridge to Springs Branch near Wigan. The timber built Chowbent Station was situated on an embankment accessed by steps and was renamed Howe Bridge in 1901. The station joined the London Midland and Scottish Railway during the Grouping in 1923. It passed to the London Midland Region of British Railways on nationalisation in 1948. It closed on 20 July 1959.

Coal deposits were the chief motivation for building a railway in the area and the railway's supporters included many local colliery owners and industrialists. A connection to Fletcher, Burrows and Company's Chanters Colliery was provided by the LNWR to the east of the station. Colliery locomotives would sometimes work through the station.

Preceding station	Disused railways	Following station
Hindley Green	LNWR	Tyldesley
