= Lancashire United =

Lancashire United may refer to:

- Blackburn Bus Company - bus operator that traded as Lancashire United until 2016
- Lancashire United Transport - former bus operator that ceased to exist in 1976
