= Musgrave non-dead-centre engine =

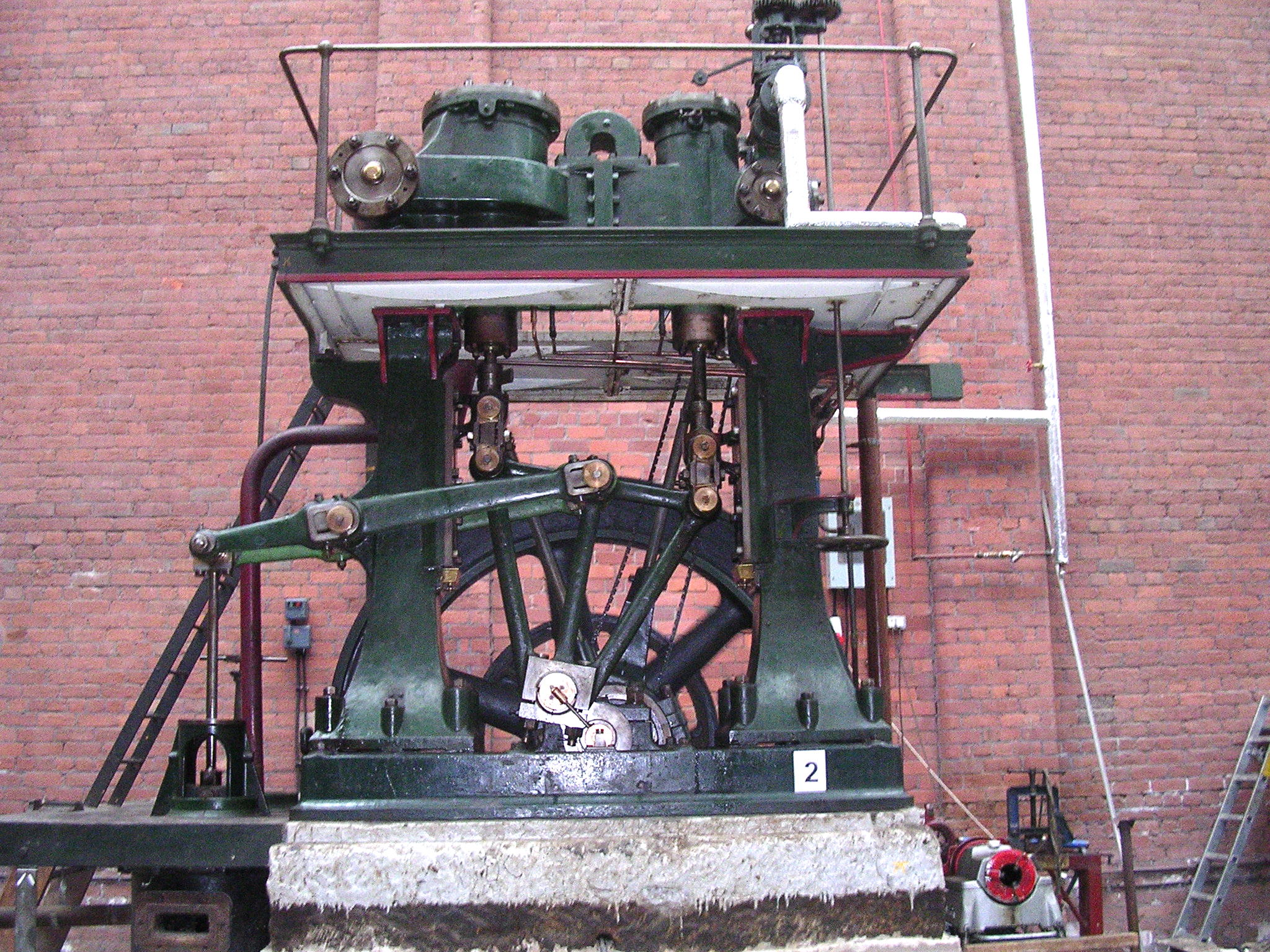
Park Street Mill engine in the Bolton Steam Museum

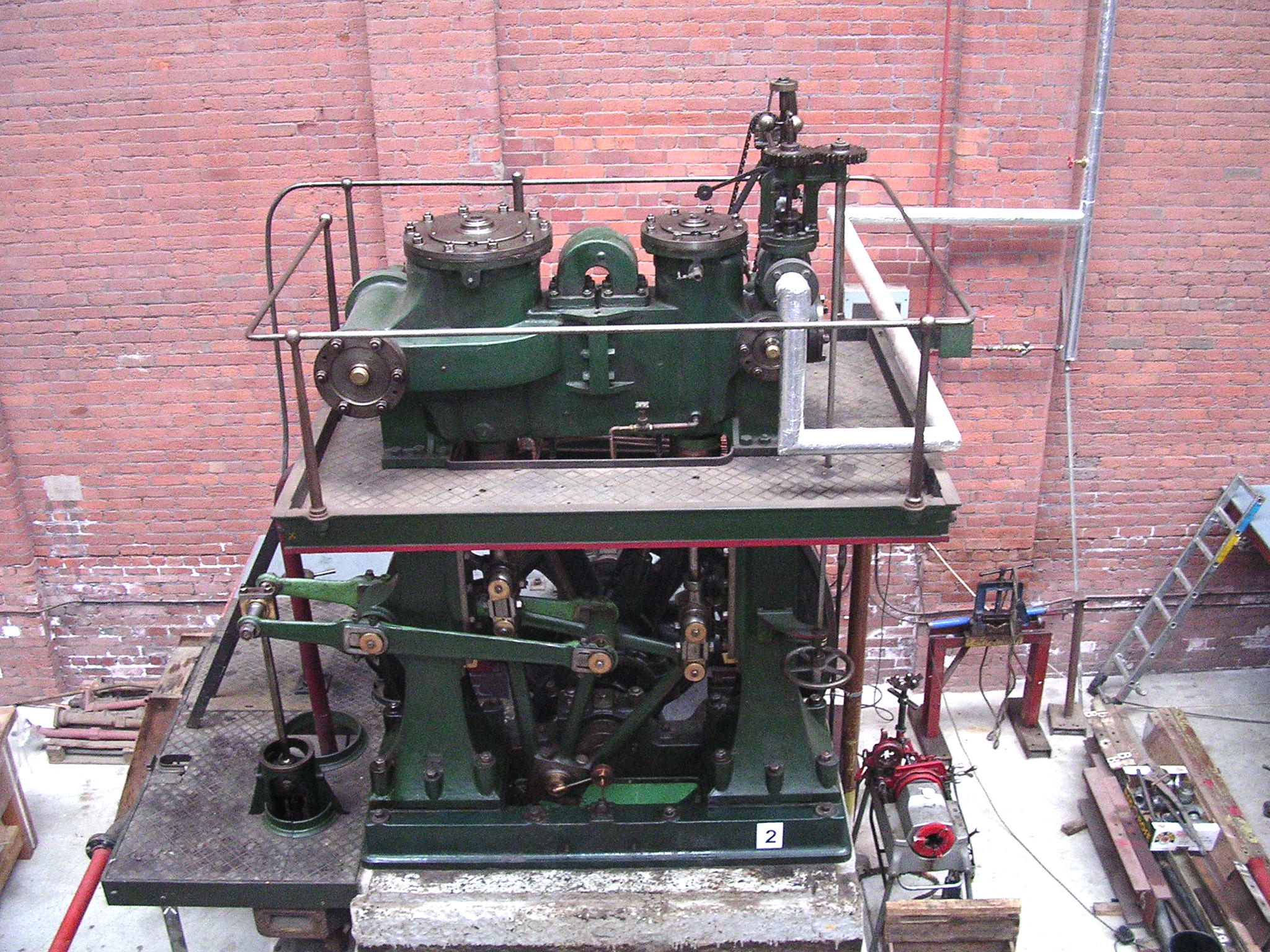
View from above the Park Street Mill engine. Larger (low pressure) cylinder is on the left.

Musgrave's non-dead-centre engine was a stationary steam engine of unusual design, intended to solve the problem of stopping on dead centre. It was designed in 1887 to serve as a marine engine. It used a pair of linked cylinders to prevent the engine from stopping in a position where no turning force can be applied. At least one engine is known to survive.

== Dead centres ==
The 'dead centre' of a piston engine with cranks is when the piston is at the exact top or bottom of the stroke and so the piston cannot exert any torque on the crankshaft. If a steam engine stops on dead centre, it will be unable to restart from that position.

Several solutions to this have been applied. One of the simplest is to try not to stop in this position, the crudest to apply a strong arm with a crowbar to turn the engine over a little. Small steam barring engines were also used to move the engine away from dead centre before starting. If the engine has multiple cylinders, most geometries for these are arranged so that all cylinders are never at dead centre together and so one may always be used for starting.

Musgrave's solution was more complex: using two cylinders, additional connecting rod linkages, and geometry to avoid the problem.

Dead centre is rarely a problem for internal combustion engines, as these usually require cranking over to provide cylinder compression and so do not attempt to self-start from stationary. Some large stationary diesel engines, where these used a compressed air starting mechanism, have suffered from the problem of dead centres and so used a small manual barring gear.

== Geometry ==
In appearance, the engine resembles a 'parallel twin' with two vertical cylinders and a single crankshaft between them, but set perpendicular to the line of the cylinders and sharing a single crankpin.

A parallel twin with this many cylinders would be self-starting from dead centre anyway (assuming the usual crankshaft with cranks at 90°).

The geometry in operation is more like that of a vee-twin engine. The two cylinders work together, but with one leading the other by approx. 30°. The difference in this case is that the cylinders are no longer directly in line with the crankshaft and so use the connecting rod as a form of bellcrank. If one cylinder is at dead centre, the other will be away from it by the amount of this angle.

A vee-twin would offer all the advantages of the Musgrave engine, but would only need two simple connecting rods. The cylinders would no longer be parallel, but that is far from impractical to manufacture, as demonstrated by the even earlier diagonal engine.

=== Connecting rod ===
The two cylinders are connected to the single crankpin through a complex connecting rod of four separate links, and a rigid mounting point to the frame and cylinders.

The main connecting rod is a large triangular frame, driven by both cylinders and driving the crankpin. Owing to the phase difference between the cylinders, this frame tilts back and forth as the engine rotates and so the cylinder crossheads drive it through two short connecting rods, allowing for some movement side-to-side. A large rocking lever attached to the engine's frame holds the connecting rod roughly central. On the Bolton engine, this lever is extended past the frame and used to drive the condenser air pump.

=== Similarities to the Ross yoke ===
A similar mechanism appears to have been invented independently, much later on. This is the Ross yoke, invented by Andy Ross for use with Stirling engines. A pair of parallel cylinders, one for the piston (driving), one containing the (driven) displacer, are connecting so that they drive back and forth with a suitable phase shift between them.

== History ==
=== Marine engines ===
The design of the engine originated with W.Y. Fleming and P.Ferguson, marine engineers of Glasgow, in 1887. It was intended for use as a marine engine, and at least 23 were supplied to ship builders requiring compact engines suitable for restricted space in engine rooms.

=== Stationary engines ===
John Musgrave & Sons of the Globe Ironworks, Bolton was a mill engine builder, supplying the local cotton mills. He licensed the design in 1892, then patented further improvements to it in 1893.

Musgrave built up to 50 of these engines, the largest offering 1,500 ihp with quadruple expansion working. Ten of these quadruple expansion, four cylinder engines were built, the remainder mostly being two-cylinder compound engines, as the Park Street Mill engine. The larger engines used Corliss valves.

The non-dead-centre mechanism also evened-out power as the crank rotated, making it suitable for driving dynamos for electricity generation. The engine also had relative high speed for its day, making it possible to drive dynamos directly. A 500 hp Corliss valve engine was installed for electricity generation in Southport.

A poster in the Science Museum advertises engines to "Fleming, Ferguson, & Dixon's patent". These are twin-cylinder compound engines with a single semi-rotary valve per cylinder (as for Park Street Mill) and are offered in a range from 8 to 250 ihp and with speeds from 160 to 250 rpm. Their working pressure is not specified, but the same poster also offers Lancashire boilers of up to 200 psi.

All of these engines are of robust construction, with large cast iron frames that have the cylinders cast integrally with them. The Park Street Mill engine is made from two large castings bolted together along a central plane and with the steam passages cored directly into the castings.

The crossheads are of the slipper pattern. This design has asymmetric bearing surfaces and so supports the forces better when the engine rotating in one direction than the other. They are commonly found on stationary engines that do not need to be reversed. However, in the Musgrave design, the two slideways face each other and so one of them will always be working "in reverse" to usual practice.

==== Patents ====
- Fleming & Ferguson
  - GB 2605 1887
  - GB 13843 1889
  - GB 20137 1890
  - GB 3165 1891
- Musgrave & Dixon
  - Improvements in Triple Expansion Engines, (1893).

== Surviving examples ==
=== Park Street Mill ===
Only one Musgrave non-dead-centre engine is known to survive, now preserved at the Bolton Steam Museum as part of the Northern Mill Engine Society collection. On steam days these engines (or at least some) may be seen in action. The collection also includes two other engines built by Musgrave's, which are not non-dead-centre engines but much smaller barring engines.

=== Models ===
- Science Museum, London

A small model of a twin-cylinder compound engine is on display.

- Model Engineer magazine

In 2009 the Model Engineer serialized the construction of a Musgrave engine, from castings supplied by the German firm of Lothar Matrian.
