= Gibfield Colliery =

Coordinates: 53.5286°N 2.5048°W

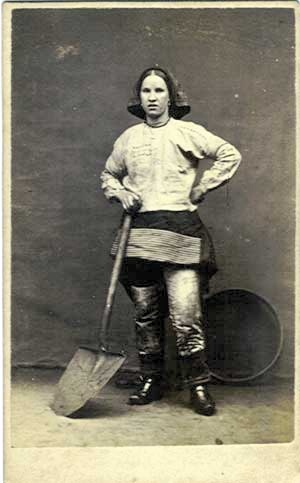
Pit brow lass from Lancashire on the Lancashire Coalfield.

Gibfield Colliery was a coal mine owned by Fletcher, Burrows and Company in Atherton, then in the historic county of Lancashire, England.

A shaft was sunk at Gibfield to the Trencherbone mine in 1829 by John Fletcher next to the Bolton and Leigh Railway line which opened in 1830. The colliery was served by sidings near Bag Lane Station.

On 11 February 1850, workers descended the pit and discovered the presence of gas which they tried to disperse with their jackets. The gas fired at the flame of a lighted candle causing an explosion which killed five men and burned several others.

In 1872 the colliery was expanded when a second shaft was sunk to access the Arley mine at 1233 feet. A third shaft was sunk after 1904 accessing nine workable coal seams between the Arley and the Victoria or Hell Hole mines and the original Gibfield shaft was used for ventilation.

In common with many collieries on the Lancashire Coalfield, women, known as Pit brow lasses were employed on the surface to sort coal on the screens at the pit head. The first pit-head baths in the country were built at Gibfield in 1913. Gibfield closed in 1963 and the site was cleared.

== See also ==
- Glossary of coal mining terminology
- List of mining disasters in Lancashire
