= Fletcher, Burrows and Company =

British coal mining company

Fletcher, Burrows and Company was a coal mining company that owned collieries and cotton mills in Atherton, Greater Manchester, England. Gibfield, Howe Bridge and Chanters collieries exploited the coal mines (seams) of the middle coal measures in the Manchester Coalfield. The Fletchers built company housing at Hindsford and a model village at Howe Bridge which included pithead baths and a social club for its workers. The company became part of Manchester Collieries in 1929. The collieries were nationalised in 1947 becoming part of the National Coal Board.

== History ==
=== Fletcher Burrows ===
In 1776 Robert Vernon Atherton of Atherton Hall leased the Atherton coal rights to Thomas Guest from Bedford and John Fletcher of Tonge with Haulgh, Bolton forbidding them to mine under the hall. The Fletchers had mining interests in Bolton and Clifton in the Irwell Valley from Elizabethan times. Matthew Fletcher's family owned most of Clifton in 1750 including the Ladyshore and Wet Earth collieries. During the early 19th century the Fletchers worked several pits around Howe Bridge. In 1832 John Fletcher's son Ralph, who lived at the Haulgh in Bolton, died leaving his pits at Great Lever to his son, John who had built up the Lovers' Lane pit, and divided the business in Atherton into shares for his sons, John, Ralph, James and his nephew John Langshaw. The company was then known as "John Fletcher and Others". The company developed the Howe Bridge Collieries and sank three shafts in the 1840s when James Fletcher was the manager. The family acquired land and property in Atherton and between 1867 and 1878 Ralph Fletcher controlled the business. Abraham Burrows became a partner in 1872 and the company became Fletcher Burrows and Company. John Burrows was the company's agent from 1878 to 1900 when Leonard Fletcher took over. In 1916 Clement Fletcher took over and remained with the company for 45 years.

The Fletcher Burrows Company was considered to be a good employer as well as having a reputation for good management, in the 1870s it built homes at Hindsford and the model village at Howe Bridge for its workers. The houses were designed by a Dutch architect. and some properties at Howe Bridge are now part of a conservation area. A public bathhouse, shops and a social club were part of the village. The workers, some of them pit brow women who worked on the pit brow screens sorting coal, were provided with hampers or turkeys at Christmas by the company. The Fletchers also contributed to the cost of St Michael and all Angels Church at Howe Bridge in 1877.

In 1867 company employee Edward Ormerod developed and patented the "Ormerod" safety link or detaching hook, a device that has saved thousands of lives in mines. The company was a supporter in setting up the first Mines Rescue Station in Lancashire at Howe Bridge in 1908.

In 1921 Heath Robinson visited the company's pits and was commissioned to produce its 1922 calendar.

=== The collieries ===
Among the old small pits working around Howe Bridge in the early 19th century were the, Old Endless Chain pit at Lovers Lane, the Old Engine Pit, the New Engine Pit (a gin pit), Marsh Pit, Little Pit, Sough Pit and Crabtree Pit. Colliers who worked for the Fletchers were entitled to free ale at the end of their shifts at the Wheatsheaf. In 1774 coal was sold for 2d. a basket but the price had risen to 5d. by 1805.

The largest of the early pits owned by the Fletchers which eventually became the Howe Bridge Collieries were Lovers' Lane Colliery which lasted until 1898 and the Eckersley Fold pits. The Crombouke Day-Eye, a drift mine or adit dates from the 1840s when a drift was driven into the Crombouke and the Brassey mines at a gradient of 1 in 5. (Note: In this part of Lancashire a coal seam is referred to as a mine and the coal mine as a colliery or pit.) The Crombouke and Eckersley Fold pits closed in 1907. The company sank the deep mines of Howe Bridge Colliery in 1845. Three shafts were sunk to the Seven Feet mine, the Victoria pit where coal was wound at 447 feet, the Puffer for pumping water at 435 feet and the Volunteer, the upcast ventilation shaft. Howe Bridge Colliery was taken over by Manchester Collieries and closed in 1959.

Gibfield Colliery's origins are in a shaft sunk to the Trencherbone mine in 1829 next to the Bolton and Leigh Railway line which opened in 1830. The colliery was served by sidings near Bag Lane Station. In 1872 the colliery was expanded when a new shaft was sunk to access the Arley mine at 1233 feet. A third shaft was sunk after 1904 accessing nine workable coal seams between the Arley Mine and the Victoria or Hell Hole mine while the original Gibfield shaft was used for ventilation. The first pit-head baths in the country were built at Gibfield in 1913. Gibfield closed in 1963 and the site was cleared.

Chanters Colliery in Hindsford was sunk in 1854 in an area where coal had been mined for centuries from small pits. One of these pits, the Gold Pit which closed before 1800 was reputed to have had an engine. The colliery was modernised and developed in 1891 when two shafts were sunk first to the Trencherbone Mine at 1121 feet and deepened to the Arley Mine at 1832 feet in 1896. These shafts accessed 12 coal seams. Coal screens and a washery were built, and steel headgear and a new winding engine installed by 1904. The colliery was continually developed and modernised and lasted until 1966.

=== Merger ===
In 1927 Robert Burrows proposed a merger of several local colliery companies including the Atherton Collieries operating west of Manchester. As a result, Manchester Collieries was formed in 1929. In turn when the coal industry was nationalised in 1947 Manchester Collieries became part of the National Coal Board's Western Division, No1 (Manchester) Area. A reorganisation in 1952 moved the Atherton Collieries into No2 (Wigan) Area.

== Colliery railways and locomotives ==
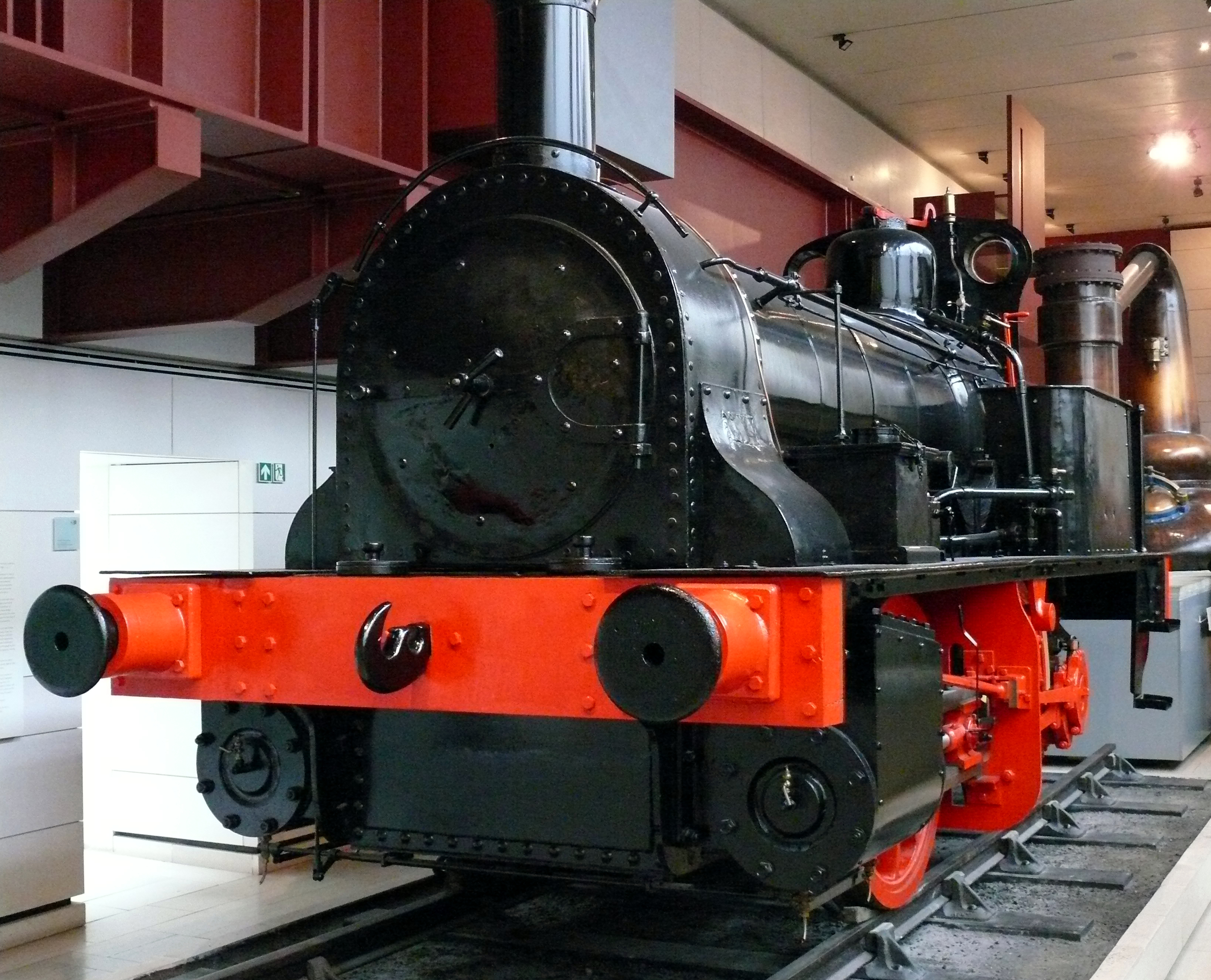
Ellesmere in preservation

After 1830 Lovers Lane colliery was connected to the Bolton and Leigh Railway at Fletchers sidings north of Atherleigh. The Fletchers built a tramroad to a landsale yard at Stock Platt Bridge in Leigh where their coal was sold. This tramroad constructed to standard gauge was converted to narrow gauge hauled by horses before 1850. The Fletchers decided to extend this short branch to the Bridgewater Canal in 1857. A basin at Bedford was built and the railway constructed from Stock Platt through Bedford via a tunnel, 889 feet long, built by the cut-and-cover method. A new line from Howe Bridge to the east of the turnpike was built to the tunnel by May 1861 and the old tramway was removed. The Fletchers bought two locomotives for use on this line, Lilford and Ellesmere, from Hawthorn's in Leith. They had reduced chimneys as the tunnel height was restricted. The tunnel operated for 70 years although in the later years its use declined and the track was lifted in 1952. The workshops at Gibfield Colliery built a 0-4-0 saddle tank in either 1888 or 1893 which probably worked to Bedford basin. It had no cab and a reduced chimney and was named Electric.

Chanters was connected to the Manchester and Wigan Railway line built by the London and North Western Railway (LNWR), in 1864 between Tyldesley and Howe Bridge Station by a short branch provided by the LNWR. Fletcher Burrows bought another Hawthorn's locomotive Atherton and in 1878, a six coupled saddle tank locomotive, Collier, from Manning Wardle in Leeds. Vulcan, a 0-6-0 saddle tank, was bought from the Vulcan Foundry in 1892 A replacement for Lilford with the same name was bought from the Hunslet Engine Company in 1897 and in 1909 the company bought its largest locomotive, another 0-6-0 saddle tank, Atlas from Pecketts in Bristol.

Two saddle tank locomotives, Carbon a 0-4-0 in 1920, and in 1923 Chowbent a 0-6-0 were bought from Andrew Barclay Sons & Co. in Kilmarnock. In 1927 0-6-0 saddle tank Colonel was bought from Hunslets.

== See also ==
- List of mining disasters in Lancashire
