= John Musgrave & Sons =

English company

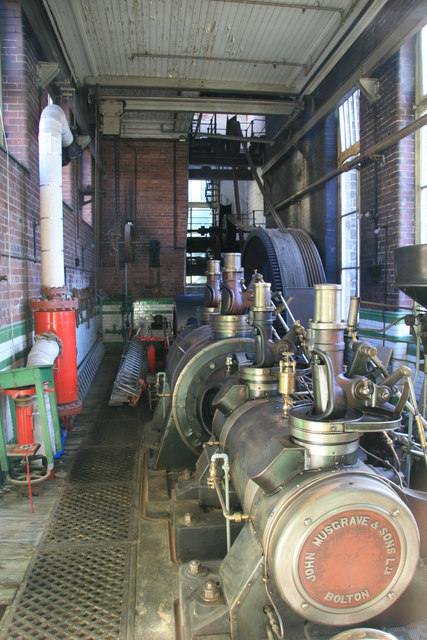
- Musgrave mill engine "Edna" at Bamford Mill
- Industry: Engineering
- Founded: 1839
- Headquarters: Bolton
- Number of locations: Globe Ironworks
- Products: Stationary steam engines, Triple- and quadruple-expansion engines, No-dead-centre engines
- Owner: John Musgrave & Sons

John Musgrave & Sons was a company that manufactured stationary steam engines. It was founded in 1839 by John Musgrave and his son, Joseph, at the Globe Ironworks, in Bolton, historically in Lancashire, England.

In 1854 the company supplied a twin cylinder horizontal winding engine, and in 1861 a single cylinder pumping engine to Chanters Colliery in Hindsford. Musgraves supplied winding engines to Wheatsheaf Colliery in 1868, Mosley Common Colliery in 1870, Brackley Colliery in 1879, Gin Pit Colliery in 1884, and Nook Colliery in 1913.

The company produced steam engines during the 19th century and between 1899 and 1908 produced 504 large steam-driven engines. The company produced engines and equipment for the coal mining industry and built a boilerworks in Westhoughton in 1900 to produce Lancashire boilers. The Westhoughton works were subject to a chancery court judgement and sold in 1912 leading to the formation of John Musgrave and Sons (1913) Ltd. which kept the Globe Ironworks. The company produced munitions during World War I.

The business closed in 1926; its drawings and patterns were taken over by W & J Galloway & Sons. A final notice of winding-up was published on 11 March 1927.

== See also ==
- Musgrave non-dead-centre engine
- Hick, Hargreaves & Co. Ltd.
