= Chanters Colliery =

Coal mine in England

Coordinates: 53.5188°N 2.4708°W

Chanters Colliery was a coal mine which was part of the Fletcher, Burrows and Company's collieries at Hindsford in Atherton, Greater Manchester, then in the historic county of Lancashire, England.

== Geology ==
Chanters Colliery exploited the Middle Coal Measures laid down in the Carboniferous period, where coal is mined from more than a dozen coal seams. Chanters accessed 12 seams between the Crumbouke and Arley mines. (Note: In this part of Lancashire a coal seam is referred to as a mine and the coal mine as a colliery or pit.) The seams generally dip towards the south and west and are affected by small faults. The Upper Coal Measures are not worked in this part of the Manchester Coalfield.

== History ==
Chanters Colliery in Hindsford was sunk in 1854 by John Fletcher in an area where coal had been mined for centuries from small shallow pits. One of these pits, the Gold Pit, so named from 17th-century coins and the plates they were stamped from found at the bottom of the shaft, was working before 1800. In 1854 John Musgrave & Sons supplied a twin cylinder horizontal winding engine, and in 1861 a single cylinder pumping engine. Steam was supplied by three Lancashire boilers and the boilerhouse had a 122 foot tall chimney.

The colliery was modernised and developed after 1891 when two shafts were sunk first to the Trencherbone mine at 1121 feet and deepened to the Arley mine at 1832 feet in 1896. These shafts accessed 12 coal seams. The boilers and winding engine were replaced in 1904.

Coal screens and a washery were built, and steel headgear and a new winding engine installed by 1904. The colliery was continually developed and modernised and lasted until 1966. In 1926 the wooden headgear of No. 2 pit was replaced by Naylors of Golborne.

The colliery's training gallery was used by recruits from most of Manchester Collieries pits and 132 Bevin boys were trained here in World War II.

== See also ==
- Glossary of coal mining terminology
