= Edward Ormerod =

English mining engineer (1834–1894)

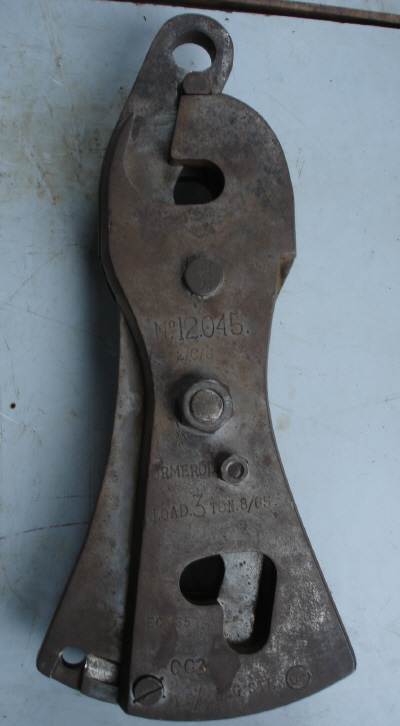
Ormerod detaching hook, or Ormerod link

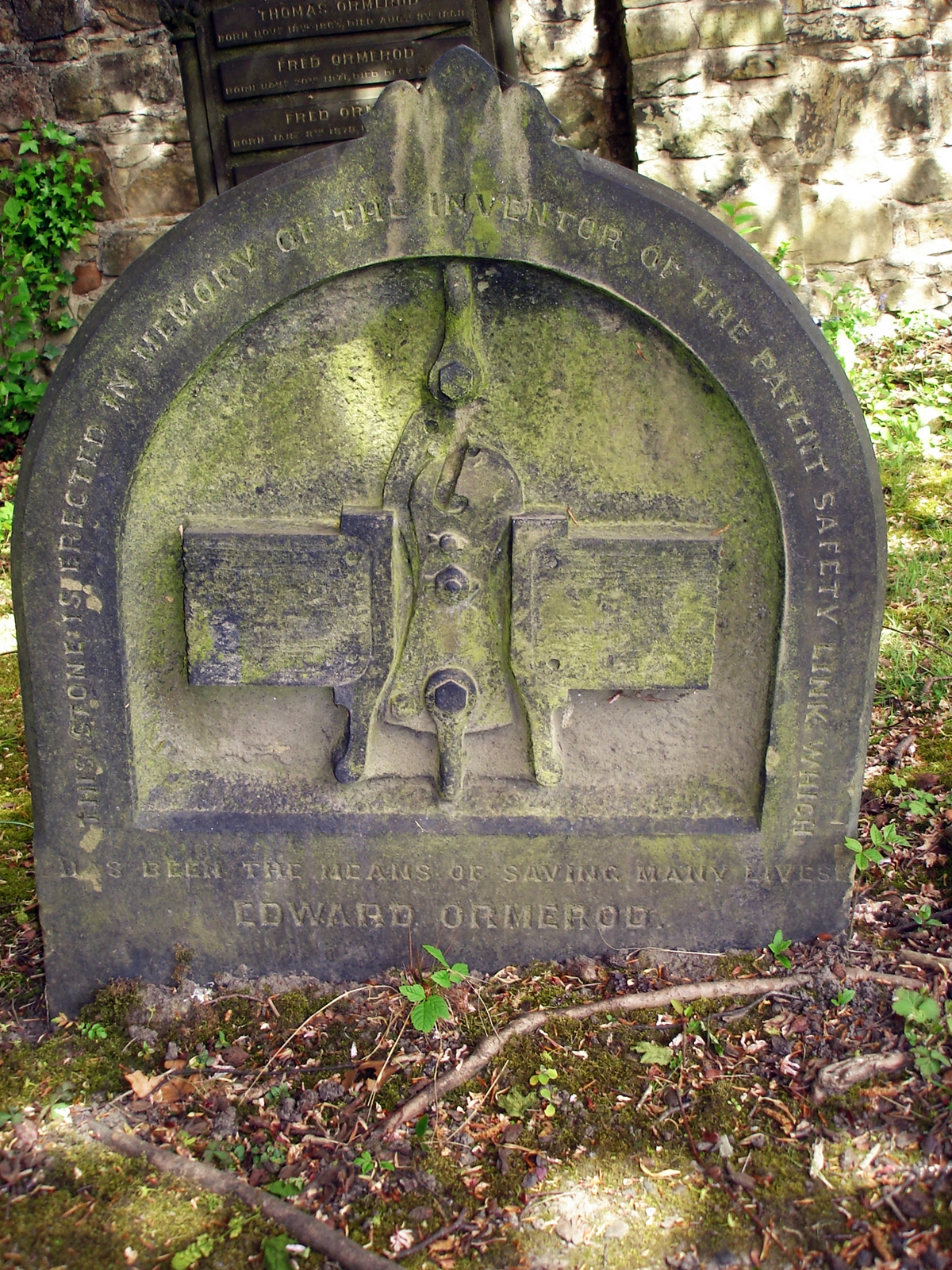
Memorial stone depicting detaching hook, Atherton cemetery

Edward Ormerod (2 May 1834 – 26 May 1894) was an English mining engineer.

Edward Ormerod (sometimes Ormrod) was born on 2 May 1834 in the village of Church, near Accrington, in Lancashire, England. He worked as a mining engineer at Fletcher, Burrows and Company's Gibfield Colliery in Atherton, Greater Manchester, where he devised and tested a safety device. He was supported by chief engineering foreman, James Rothwell from Hindley. He married Betsy Hope in 1856 and had several children. He died on 26 May 1894 and is buried in Atherton Cemetery. A small memorial stone in front of his grave depicts and pays tribute to his invention.

Edward Ormerod developed and patented the "Ormerod" safety link or detaching hook, known in mining circles as a "butterfly". This elegant device was inserted into the winding rope in such a way that if the lift cage was accidentally overwound the link would be pulled into a bell through which the winding rope passed. This action would not only disconnect the cage from the winding rope but also prevent the cage from falling back down the shaft. The device was patented in 1867 and is manufactured today. It is believed that the lives of many miners have been saved by its use and it has never failed in service.

The design was awarded a gold medal at the Manchester Mechanical & Industrial exhibition of 1875 and a silver medal at the Franco British Exhibition in 1908.
