= Howe Bridge =

Suburb of Atherton, Greater Manchester, England

Coordinates: 53.5201°N 2.5047°W

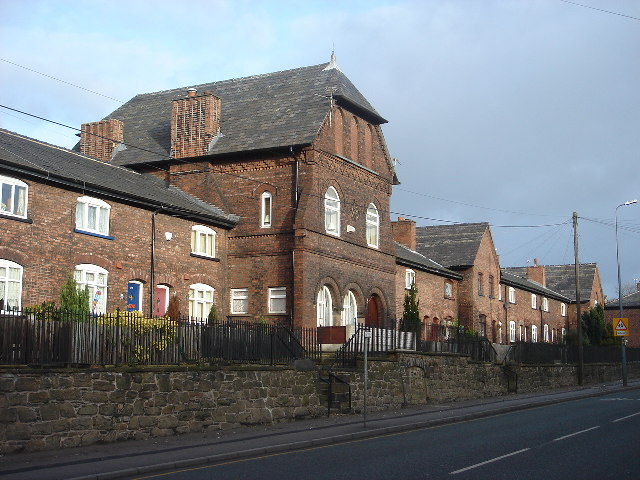
- Howe Bridge village

- Location within Greater Manchester
- OS grid reference: SD666027
  - London: 170 mi (274 km) SE
- Metropolitan borough: Wigan
- Metropolitan county: Greater Manchester
- Region: North West
- Country: England
- Sovereign state: United Kingdom
- Post town: MANCHESTER
- Postcode district: M46
- Dialling code: 01942
- Police: Greater Manchester
- Fire: Greater Manchester
- Ambulance: North West
- UK Parliament: Leigh

Howe Bridge is a suburb of Atherton, Greater Manchester, England. Historically within Lancashire, it is south west of Atherton town centre on the B5215, the old turnpike road from Bolton to Leigh. The settlement was built as a model pit village by the owners of Atherton Collieries.

== History ==
John Fletcher of Bolton, a member of a family with mining interests, came to Atherton in 1768 to sink two shafts. Ralph Fletcher was part-owner in the Ladyshore Colliery. The pits developed and Fletcher, Burrows and Company's Atherton Collieries was formed in 1870, owning all the coalmines in the town. Howe Bridge Colliery employed 460 men in 1954. In 1908 the Howe Bridge Mines Rescue Station opened on Lovers Lane. It was the first mines rescue station in Lancashire.

== Transport ==
The station at Howe Bridge was originally named Chowbent and, in common with other stations on the Manchester to Wigan Line, was opened by the London and North Western Railway on 1 September 1864.

South Lancashire Tramways built a tram shed, power station and offices in 1901 on the north side of Leigh Road. It was taken over by Lancashire United Transport who built a bus depot on the south side Leigh Road on the site of the closed Howe Bridge Colliery pithead.

== Religion ==
A school and mission opened at Howe Bridge in the Atherton parish in 1869. St Michael and All Angels Church was built in 1877 as a result of the late Victorian urbanisation which occurred when the small settlement on the road from Atherton to Leigh became a pit village when deep mining began at Howe Bridge Colliery. The church was designed by Paley and Austin of Lancaster, and the £7,000 cost was given by John Fletcher.

== Landmarks ==
Between 1873 and 1875, Fletcher, Burrows and Company, owners of the local collieries, built a model village on Leigh Road, comprising terraced cottages, shops, Atherton Collieries Village Club and a bath house for their employees. This Victorian village on either side of Leigh Road, together with St Michael and All Angel's Church, is a conservation area.
