= Lancashire United Transport =

Public transport operator in England

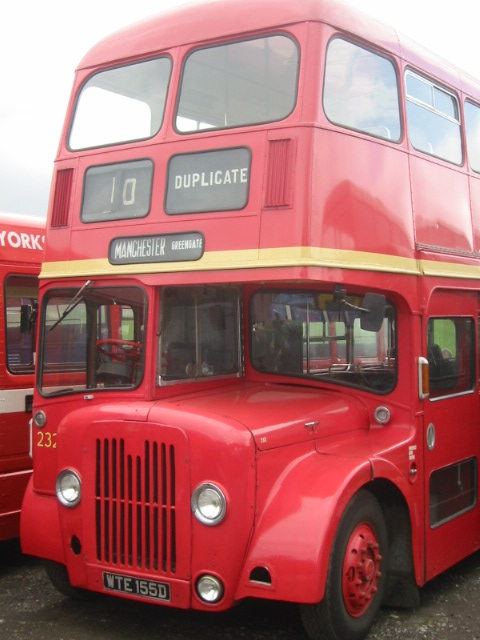
- A preserved Lancashire United Transport bus with Northern Counties bodywork
- Formerly: Lancashire United Tramways Ltd
- Founded: 1905
- Defunct: 1976
- Fate: Acquired by Greater Manchester Passenger Transport
- Headquarters: Howe Bridge, Atherton, Greater Manchester, England

Lancashire United Transport (LUT) was a tram, bus and trolleybus operator based at Howe Bridge in Atherton, 10 miles north west of Manchester. It was the largest independent bus operator in the United Kingdom until its acquisition by the Greater Manchester Passenger Transport Executive in 1976.

== History ==
The company was founded in 1905 as Lancashire United Tramways Ltd to assume operation of the South Lancashire Tramways tram system, which had run into financial difficulties. The tram system was centred on the towns of Leigh and Atherton in South Lancashire, with lines running towards St Helens, Wigan, Bolton and Salford.

Trams continued to run under the "South Lancashire Tramways" fleetname, but after World War I LUT took the opportunity to operate motorbus services using the "Lancashire United" fleetname. By 1926, the bus fleet had reached the total of 100 operating over 21 routes. The company changed its name in the same year to Lancashire United Transport and Power Company Ltd to reflect the widened range of business activities.

The company continued to operate routes in South Lancashire until purchased by Greater Manchester Passenger Transport Executive in 1976. LUT remained as an independent subsidiary until 1981 when the company was officially wound up and its assets transferred to Greater Manchester Transport.

== See also ==
- List of bus operators of the United Kingdom

== Bibliography ==
- Brown, Stewart J. (1995) Greater Manchester Buses, Capital Transport. ISBN 1-85414-174-0
- Ogden, Eric (2006) Lancashire United: A Centenary Celebration 1906–2006, Venture Publications. ISBN 1-905304-12-9
