= Glossary of coal mining terminology =

This is a partial glossary of coal mining terminology commonly used in the coalfields of the United Kingdom. Some words were in use throughout the coalfields, some are historic and some are local to the different British coalfields.

== A ==
Adit

An adit is an underground level or tunnel to the surface for access or drainage purposes.

Afterdamp

Afterdamp is a mixture of carbon monoxide and chokedamp which replaces atmospheric air after an explosion.

Agent

The agent was the senior colliery manager: the term "viewer", "captain" or "steward" also appeared in older regional terminology. Where the mine owner provided the capital and sank the shafts, the agent organised the development of the colliery, determined mining methods, advised the owner on the mine's commercial management and labour policy, and in later years was generally a trained mining engineer. In the management hierarchy the agent was superior to the colliery manager and under-manager, who had day to day operational responsibility. An agent responsible for several collieries and managers was termed a "general manager".

Airway

A roadway used for ventilation.

== B ==
Bank, pit bank or pit brow

The bank, pit bank or pit brow is the area at the top of the shaft.

Banksman or banker

A banksman, banker, hillman or browman works at the pit bank to dispatch the coals, and organise the workforce. He is in charge of loading or unloading the cage, drawing full tubs from the cages and replacing them with empty ones. The counterpart role at pit bottom is the onsetter.

Bell

A bell, bell stone or pan was a loose, roughly bell-shaped stone in the mine roof, liable to fall without warning: the cause of many coalmine fatalities. Bells were usually found in shale, but rarely in sandstone.

Bevin Boys

Bevin Boys were men conscripted to work in the collieries during World War II in a scheme introduced by Ernest Bevin.

Bell pit

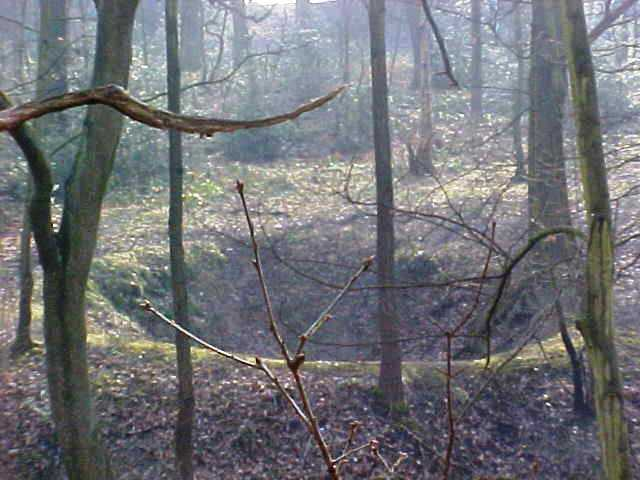
Bell pit in Middleton Park, Leeds

A bell pit was a type of coal mine in which coal found close to the surface was extracted by sinking a shaft and removing coal from around it until the roof became unstable. It was then abandoned and left to subside.

Bind

A term used in various areas to refer to shale, mudstone, clay or sandstone overlying the seam.

Bituminous coal

Bituminous coal is a type of coal found in the most coalfields. It is laid down in seams and varies in constituency and quality. It was used to produce town gas or coke, raise steam in industrial boilers or locomotives, to fuel power stations or for domestic heating.

Blackdamp

Blackdamp is the name given to a mixture of carbon dioxide and nitrogen.

Blower

A blower was a source of firedamp issuing into the mine from a fissure in the coal. The term "feeder" was used in some areas. The issue of gas was often audible, hence the name.

Brattice

Brattice, strong canvas sheeting coated in tar to make it air-tight, is used to make partitions to deflect air into particular areas of a colliery or divide a shaft to improve ventilation and dilute flammable or noxious gases.

Bump

A bump, pounce, thump or goff was a sudden movement in the strata while underground and occasionally gave warning of an imminent outburst. They were often preceded by a characteristic noise, also in some areas called a bump. Trainee miners often found bumps a frightening experience.

Butterfly

A butterfly is a safety link or detaching hook above the cage attached to the winding rope to prevent the cage from being over wound. It was invented by Edward Ormerod.

Butty

A miner's name for a working partner (South Wales) or for their opposite number on another shift (N. England) but also in earlier times an alternative name for a charter master. The "butty system" was the contracting system used by charter masters.

== C ==
Cage

The cage is the iron framework in which men and coal tubs are wound up and down the shaft. It could have one or more decks to increase its capacity.

Chargehand

General term for a supervisory worker.

Charter master

A charter master, butty or contractor was in the 19th century and earlier a man who contracted with a pit owner to work a colliery seam for a tonnage price, while arranging and paying for labour himself. While this labour system gradually fell into disuse except in small collieries, until nationalisation the term "charter master" was in a few areas still sometimes used to refer to the supervisory official usually called a deputy.

Chock

A chock was originally a piece of timber used to support the face. In later years hydraulic chocks were used.

Collier

In its most restricted sense, a collier is a worker who "gets" the coal, i.e. a hewer or coal getter.

Contraband

Contraband was material banned from being taken down the mine, generally for safety reasons, such as matches and cigarettes. Miners were regularly checked for contraband.

Corf or corve

A woven wood basket for carrying or transporting (called hurrying) coal to the surface.

== D ==
Damp

Damp is gas, it derives from the German word dampf meaning vapour.

Dataller

A dataller, day wage man or day-man was paid on a daily basis for work done as required. Datallers' work included building and repairing roadways.

Davy lamp

A Davy lamp is an early type of safety lamp named after its inventor, Sir Humphry Davy. A similar lamp was designed by George Stephenson.

Day level

A level driven from the surface.

Deep

Workings and roadways at a level below the pit bottom.

Deputy

A "deputy overman", deputy, fireman (North Wales and parts of Lancashire) or examiner (South Wales) was an underground official who had supervision of a district and the men working in it. Deputies were designated as the competent person directly responsible for the safety of their district and inspection of its roadways. The role developed as an amalgamation of several earlier roles: in early mining, deputies were responsible for timbering, while a "fireman" was originally responsible for testing for firedamp: an "examiner" was originally the supervisor on a non coal turning shift, earning less pay than a deputy. Deputies were promoted from amongst experienced miners: from 1911, the role required certification of competence, but gradually changed so that supervision of production was added to safety responsibilities. Deputies carried a yardstick, originally a measuring stick but later adapted to raise a safety lamp to test for gas, and later still to mount a gas testing bulb. Deputies like other officials also carried a relightable version of the standard safety lamp.

Dip

Declivity of the strata. A heading or roadway following the dip of the strata was called a "dip road" or (in the North and Scotland) a "dook".

District

A district is a specific, usually named area of the coalface where particular seams are worked.

Doggy

A doggy, also known as a corporal in the Midlands, was an underground supervisor with responsibility for the haulage men; the role was similar to that of the deputy at the face, and later sometimes included the responsibility of the deputy to test for gas.

Downcast, downcast shaft

The downcast is the shaft by which fresh air descends into the mine. After a disaster at Hartley Colliery in 1862, legislation decreed that collieries should have two means of entering the coal workings. In effect this meant two shafts which aided ventilation.

Downthrow

A fault, when approached from the higher side.

Drawer

A drawer, putter (Northumberland), hurrier (Yorkshire), or waggoner is a person, usually a boy or young man who pushes tubs of coal from the coal face to the pit eye. Before 1842 women did this type of work in some coalfields.

Drift

A drift is an underground road between seams; to be distinguished from drift mining.

Dudley

A metal container to hold drinking water.

== E ==
Engine pit

The shaft where the pumping engine was located was often termed the "engine pit"; the second shaft sunk, during development, was termed the "bye pit". In practice the bye pit usually served as the upcast or air shaft.

Engineer

In traditional terminology a mine engineer was a senior person responsible for all boilers and machinery and for supervision of the enginewrights. In Scotland the word "engineer" referred to a surveyor.

Engineman

An engineman drove a haulage engine; a winding engineman or winder drove the winding engine.

Eye or pit-eye

The eye or pit-eye is the area at the bottom of the shaft.

== F ==
Face or coal face

The coal face is the place where coal is cut from the coal seam either manually by hewers or mechanically by machine.

Fire boss

A fire boss is a certified underground coal mine safety official who inspects work areas for hazards like methane, oxygen deficiency, and roof instability before each shift. They are usually the first to enter the mine to ensure safety, often required to perform these checks within 3 hours of the crew's arrival.

Firedamp

Firedamp is explosive, flammable gas consisting predominantly of methane.

Fitter

A fitter is a worker responsible for the maintenance of underground machinery.

Furnace, furnace pit

Furnaces were used in the 19th century instead of fans for ventilation. The furnace was usually at the bottom of the upcast shaft which acted as a chimney, creating airflow throughout the workings.

== G ==
Gannister

Gannister is siliceus fireclay which can be used to make firebricks.

Garland

A garland was a water channel or gutter in the lining of a mine shaft.

Gate

A gate is a tunnel serving the coal face, the maingate is where fresh air enters and the tailgate is where spent air exits.

Goaf, gove or gob

The goaf, gove, gob, shut or waste is the void from which all the coal in a seam has been extracted and where the roof is allowed to collapse in a controlled manner.The term possibly comes from Welsh language ogof, gof, "cave".

== H ==
Headframe, headstocks or headgear

The headframe, headstocks or headgear is the framework holding the winding wheel over the shaft.

Heading

A roadway generally; more specifically, a roadway in the process of development.

=== Heapkeeper, heap keeper, keeker or heap inspector ===
A person responsible to the mine manager for the work done by the men and boys engaged in cleaning and screening the coals at the pithead and loading them into waggons. The heapkeeper keeps a wages book showing the shifts worked by those under him and makes daily reports to the mine manager stating quantity of coal drawn and how it has been disposed of. The heapkeeper may also be responsible for recording goods received by rail.

Heave

Heave or floor heave refers to the floor of a roadway lifting as a result of ground stresses, reducing the roadway height. Soft floors can also bubble up; this was called "creep".

Hewer

A hewer is a coal face worker who digs coal, loosening the coal with a pick.

Hurrier, putter, drawer or waggoner

A hurrier (Yorkshire), putter (Northumberland), waggoner or drawer (Lancashire) was the person who brought empty coal tubs up to the coal face and took loaded tubs to the pit bottom.

== I ==
Inbye

Inbye means going away from the pit shaft towards the coal face (Opposite of outbye).

Inset

An inset is an opening part way down a shaft giving access to intermediate levels of a mine.

Intake

An intake airway is one along which fresh air travels into the mine.

== J ==
Jenkin

A jenkin is a narrow excavation driven through a pillar of coal.

Jud

Jud, or judd (Derbyshire, North-East), is a depth of coal in the face that will fall after being undercut: a coal face ready for taking down. "Web", "fall", and other terms were used elsewhere.

== K ==
=== Keeker ===
See heepkeeper.

Koepe winding

Koepe is a system of winding, using the friction between the winding ropes and the drive pulley. It was developed in Germany and introduced to England by the National Coal Board.

== L ==
Lampman

A lampman had responsibility for maintaining lamps and for issuing them from the lamp room at the start of a shift.

Level

A level is a roadway along the strike of the strata, i.e. at right angles to the dip.

Longwall face

A longwall face is a coal face of considerable length between the gates from which the coal is removed.

== M ==
Main gate

The main gate is the intake airway and the conveyor belt road to move coal from the face to the shaft.

Mantrip

A mantrip is a shuttle for transporting miners down into an underground mine at the start of their shift, and out again at the end. Mantrips usually take the form of a train, running on a mine railway and operating like a cable car.

Man winding

Man winding: the process of using the cage to transport workers up or down the shaft. Also referred to as manriding, though the latter also referred to transport elsewhere in the pit. "Man winding speed" was usually set lower than mineral winding speed.

Manager

A colliery manager was appointed by the owner or agent and had overall charge of coal production and labour policy. Managers required certification following the 1872 Mines Act: in practice the duties of the manager were very varied and might extend to all parts of the business. The manager was responsible for observance of the regulations under the Coal Mines Act 1911 and was required to make a daily personal supervision of the mine. They were assisted by one or more undermanagers and by the overmen, who largely assumed the face-to-face aspects of labour management. In the case of smaller mines, the regulations allowed the owner or agent to appoint themselves as manager.

Master shifter

The master shifter supervised gangs of shifters (labourers), repairers and stonemen carrying out work during the night repairing shift.

== N ==
NACODS

Nacods is an abbreviation for the National Association of Colliery Overmen, Deputies and Shotfirers. This was the union that represented colliery officials and underofficials in Great Britain.

== O ==
Official

Colliery officials and underofficials, as distinguished from managers, were qualified workers with practical supervisory responsibility: overmen, deputies and shotfirers.

Onsetter

Worker at pit bottom responsible for loading the cages.

Outbye

Outbye means going towards the pit shaft from the coal face. (opposite of inbye).

Outcrop

An outcrop is where the coal seam is exposed at the surface.

Overcast

A place where one roadway crosses another, specifically where an airway was built across the top of another airway for ventilation purposes.

Overman

The overman or (in a few areas) overlooker, bailiff or gaffer was the foreman or senior underground official of a pit, immediately subordinate to the manager and under-managers. They were themselves superior to the deputies and had competence to run the whole of the underground workings in the management's absence. The overman was responsible for production or output, although after mechanisation elements of this role began to be assumed by the deputies. There was generally one overman for each shift.

Overwind

A type of accident in which winding of the cage failed to stop at the top or bottom of the shaft. The consequences of such an accident could be extremely serious, as at Brookhouse Colliery, 1958, or the 1973 Markham Colliery disaster.

Owner

The owner or coal owner, also called the lessee or coal master, held the lease to work minerals. They provided the capital and sank the shafts, and in some cases might act as a managing director. However except in small mines, mine development, pricing, buying materials and other technical and commercial considerations were the responsibility of the agent or viewer.

== P ==
Pack

Loose stone built up to support the roof.

Panel or pannel working

The division of a colliery into areas (or districts) separated from each other by thick walls of coal. Each panel is separately ventilated. Helps confine the blast from a gas explosion.

Pass-bye

A pass-bye or passbye was a siding for coal tubs.

Pillar

A pillar is a section of unworked coal supporting the roof. Unworked pillars of coal are left to prevent subsidence to surface features. The shaft pillar is left to prevent damage to the shafts from the workings.

Pit

Strictly refers to a shaft, though also used to refer to a colliery more generally.

Pit brow lasses

Pit brow (pit broo) lasses were women who worked at the coal screens on the pit top up to the mid-1960s, mainly in the Lancashire and Cumberland coalfields.

Pitman

While the term "pitman" is sometimes used to refer to any underground worker, it was more specifically used, particularly under the NCB, to refer to a worker who inspected and repaired the shafts. The terms "shaftman", "shanker" and "shaft hand" were also regionally used. Amongst other duties the pitman could be expected to descend the shaft on top of the cage, visually checking for problems.

Props or pit props

Props or pit props are timber or hydraulic supports holding up the roof.

Puncheon

A short post, especially one used for supporting the roof in a coal mine.

Putter

A putter (Northumberland), hurrier (Yorkshire), waggoner or drawer (Lancashire) was the person who brought empty coal tubs up to the coal face and took loaded tubs to the pit bottom.

== R ==
Red hat

A red hat is an inexperienced coal miner apprentice, typically with under one year of experience in the mine. In some states, like WV, it is required that apprentice miner's wear a red helmet to identify them.

Repairer

A repairer carries out work on roads, roofs, etc; in Wales a repairer was a timberman.

Rescue man

A member of the colliery rescue team, trained in first aid and to work using a respirator. Rescue men could be volunteers or (after the Coal Mines Act 1911) members of an area's permanent Rescue Brigade.

Return

A return is a roadway along which foul air travels from the face on its way out of the mine.

Ripper, Ripping

Rippers are men who remove the rock above the coal seam and set rings (arches) to raise the height of the gate or road as the coal face advances.

== S ==
Screens

Term for the pit head, where coal was sorted from dirt before washing.

Shaft

A shaft is a vertical or near-vertical tunnel that gives access to a coal mine accommodating the cage and providing ventilation.

Shotfirer

A shotfirer is a colliery underofficial qualified to detonate shots or explosive charges. Becoming a shotfirer was often a step towards becoming a deputy: whether deputies should also be permitted to detonate shots in addition to their other duties was a matter of some debate during the 20th century.

Sinker

A sinker specialises in creating new mine shafts. A "master sinker" had supervision of a team of sinkers.

Slope

A slope road, also known as a slant (in Wales), downbrow, or gug (Somerset) was a roadway driven at an angle to a level course.

Small coals

Coals of less than normal size, usually with less heating power, commanding a lower market price, and perhaps attracting a smaller customs duty. They are defined, where necessary, by the screen size. Small coals may be produced accidentally by breakage, and sometimes deliberately as a by-product of screening out the more valuable round coals. Small coal at one time referred to charcoal, but this usage is obsolete.

Snap or bait

Snap, bait or piece is food taken to eat part way through the shift and often carried in a snap tin.

Sough

A sough is a drainage tunnel to take water from coal mines without the need to pump it to the surface. An example is the Great Haigh Sough.

Spoil tip

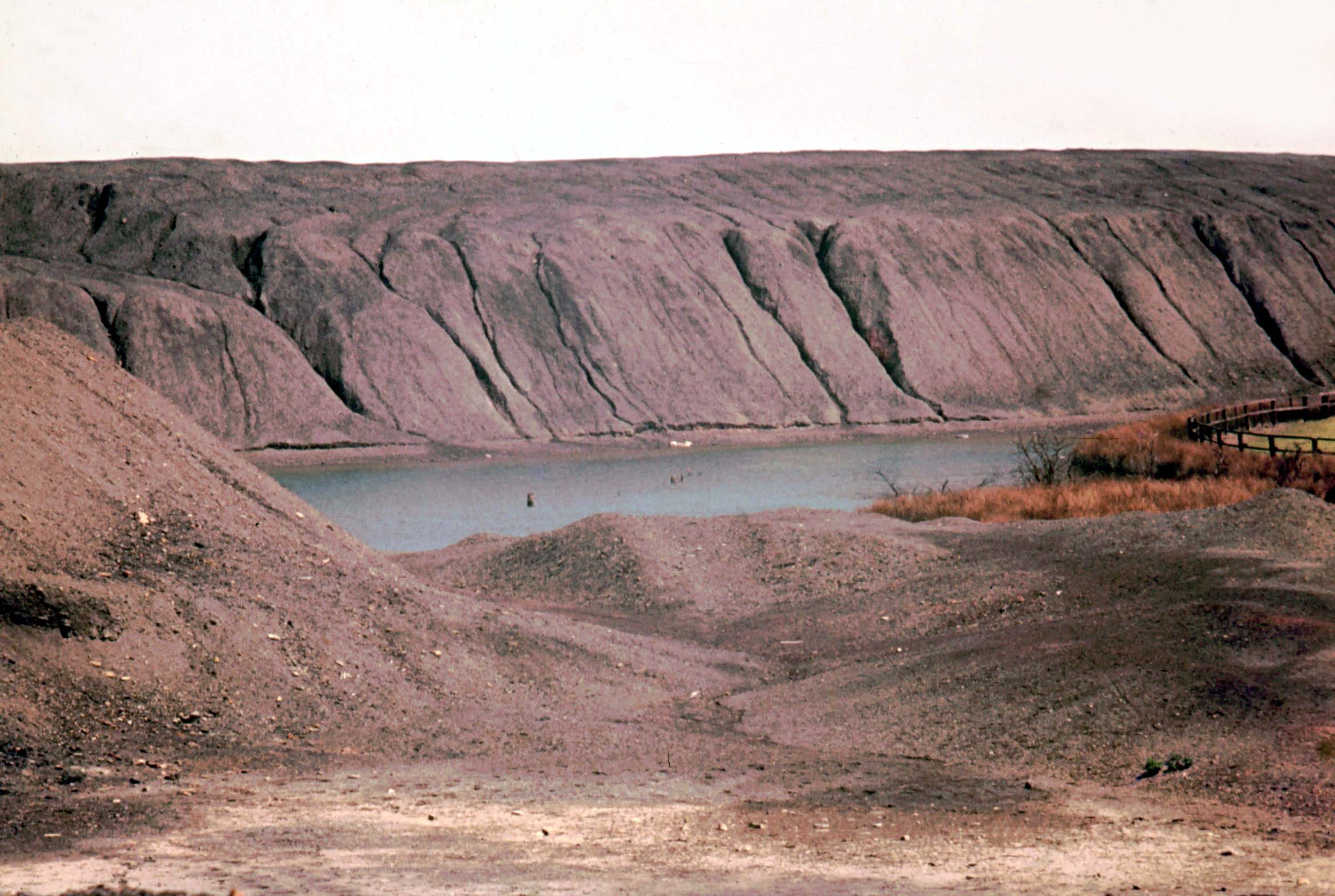
Gin Pit Colliery's old spoil tip or rucks

A spoil tip is a pile built of accumulated spoil - the overburden or other waste rock removed during coal and ore mining.

Squeeze

A squeeze, weight or pinching was settling of the strata over a worked out area, resulting in lowering of the roof.

Stinkdamp

Sulphuretted hydrogen gas, lethal following brief exposure.

Surveyor

A surveyor, latcher, dialler or (in Scotland) engineer was responsible for taking bearings underground, plotting surveys and drawing plans; a surveyor's assistant was also called a "chainman".

Sylvester

A sylvester, or nanny, was a ratchet device for pulling out pit props, used particularly when collapsing the roof during longwall mining.

== T ==
Timberman

A timberman cut, shaped and set pit props.

Trapper

A trapper was a child employed (before 1842) to open and close doors in roadways along which the coal tubs were transported.

Tub

Tubs or coal tubs are wooden or iron vessels to carry coal.

== U ==
Upcast, upcast shaft

The upcast is the shaft by which the spent air is expelled after ventilating the mine workings. It may be considered a type of chimney.

Upthrow

An upthrow fault has moved a seam to a higher level.

== V ==
Viewer

A term used from the 18th century, the viewer was the agent or surveyor appointed by the owner to manage the colliery.

== W ==
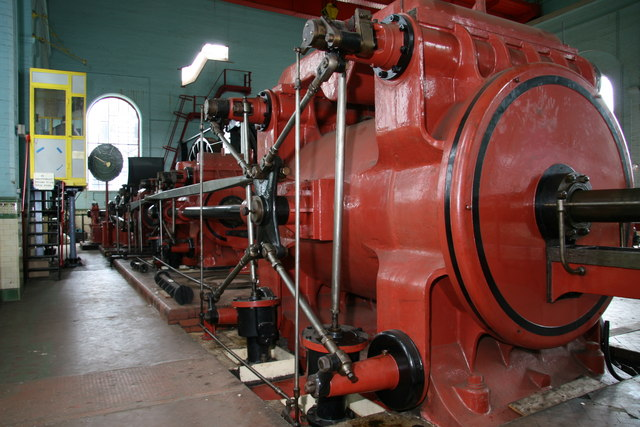
Winding engine at Astley Green Colliery Museum

Whitedamp

Whitedamp is another name for a mixture of carbon monoxide and hydrogen sulphide. Whitedamp received its name as lights tended to burn more brightly in its presence.

Winder

The winder is either the winding engine that raises or lowers the cages in a shaft or the man who operates it.

Winning

Coal (or a colliery) is said to be won when it is made accessible for exploitation; winning comprehends boring for coal, sinking the shafts, excavations, and the actual procuring of coal under circumstances favourable for its being worked.

== Y ==
Yard

Yard could refer to the pit top and its surroundings, or the name of a coal seam.
