= Pit brow women =

Female labourers at British coal mines

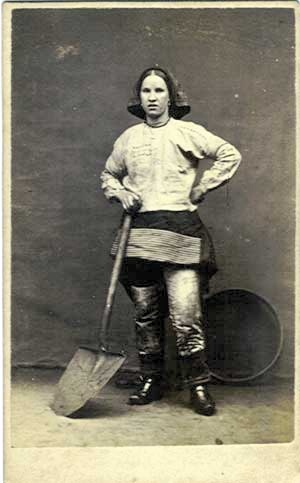
Pit brow lass from Wigan on the Lancashire Coalfield.

Pit brow women or pit brow lasses were female surface labourers at British collieries. They worked at the coal screens on the pit bank (or brow) at the shaft top until the 1960s. Their job was to pick stones from the coal after it was hauled to the surface. More women were employed in this capacity on the Lancashire Coalfield than in any other area.

== Background ==
From the 1600s in Lancashire it was common for whole families to be employed in the pits. Colliers relied on their wives, sons and daughters who were employed as drawers. The daughters of colliers usually married within the mining community. In the early coal industry women and girls worked underground alongside men and boys in small coal pits. It was common practice in Lancashire and Cumberland, Yorkshire, the East of Scotland and South Wales. The death of Elizabeth Higginson working underground was recorded in the register of Wigan Parish Church in 1641.

An article in the Gentleman's Magazine in 1795 described Betty Hodson aged nine who worked underground with her brother, aged seven, dragging baskets of coals for their father.

As the industry grew the population expanded and more members of extended mining families obtained work. Pit work in south-west Lancashire resulted in the area around Wigan having the highest rates of female employment in the country in the 19th century.

== Mines and Collieries Act 1842 ==
On 4 July 1838, a flash flood at the Huskar Pit near Silkstone in Yorkshire caused the deaths of 26 children aged from seven to 17 who were drowned while trying to escape. The disaster led to a public outcry and subsequent Royal Commission led by Anthony Ashley Cooper. Until the Mines and Collieries Act 1842 was passed prohibiting boys under ten years of age and all women and girls from working underground in coal mines, it was common for women and children to work shifts of 11 or 12 hours underground. Children as young as five or six worked as trappers opening and closing ventilation doors before becoming hurriers, pushing tubs of coal to the shaft bottom.

=== Aftermath ===
The prohibition of underground female labour caused much suffering and hardship and was greatly resented in south-west Lancashire. The employment of women did not end abruptly in 1842; with the connivance of some employers, women dressed as men continued to work underground for several years. Penalties for employing women were small and inspectors were few and some women were so desperate for work they willingly worked illegally for less pay. Children continued working underground at some pits. At Coppull Colliery's Burgh Pit, three female workers died after an explosion in November 1846; one was eleven years old.

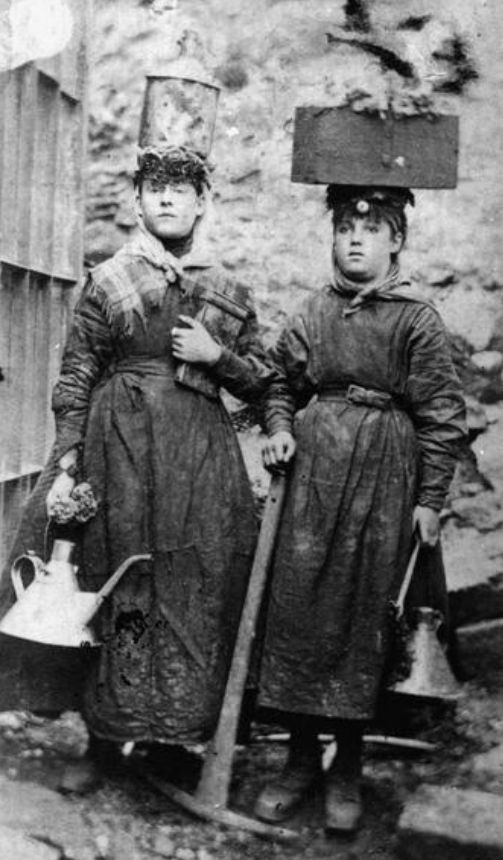
A photo of pit girls in South Wales, from the late Victorian period

Not all women who had worked underground gained employment as surface workers. Lighter work on the surface had traditionally been reserved for older men and men who had been injured below ground and some colliery owners considered pits unsuitable places for women. Other colliery owners were happy to employ women who had proved themselves reliable and strong workers and were used to the language and habits of the miners. Male surface workers earned twice the wages of the women who worked twelve-hour shifts, five days a week and a shorter shift on Saturdays. Women surface workers were concentrated in Scotland, South Wales, Cumberland, Shropshire and South Staffordshire and Lancashire.

== Dress ==
Pit-brow women working outside in the cold and dirt developed a distinctive "uniform", they wore clogs, trousers covered with a skirt and apron, old flannel jackets or shawls and headscarfs to protect their hair from coal dust. The women's unconventional but practical dress drew them to the attention of the public and carte de visite and cabinet card portraits and later postcards of them in working clothes were produced commercially and sold to visitors as novelties. Photographic studios in Wigan which produced such work were Louisa Millard (in the late-1860s), Cooper (between 1853 and 1892), and Wragg (which produced a series of at least 18 studio images). Arthur Munby, a lawyer with an interest in women who worked in dirty and unusual conditions, commissioned many photographs. Munby visited the Wigan area many times over many years, interviewing working-class women and recording in his diaries what they had to say about their jobs, pay and living conditions.

Victorian sensibilities were outraged by women working at pits and dressing in trousers was considered unfeminine and degenerate by society.

== See also ==
- Bal maiden - women who worked the Cornish tin mines
- Victorian dress reform
