= Monton Green railway station =

Former railway station in England

Coordinates: 53.49177°N 2.35597°W

Monton Green
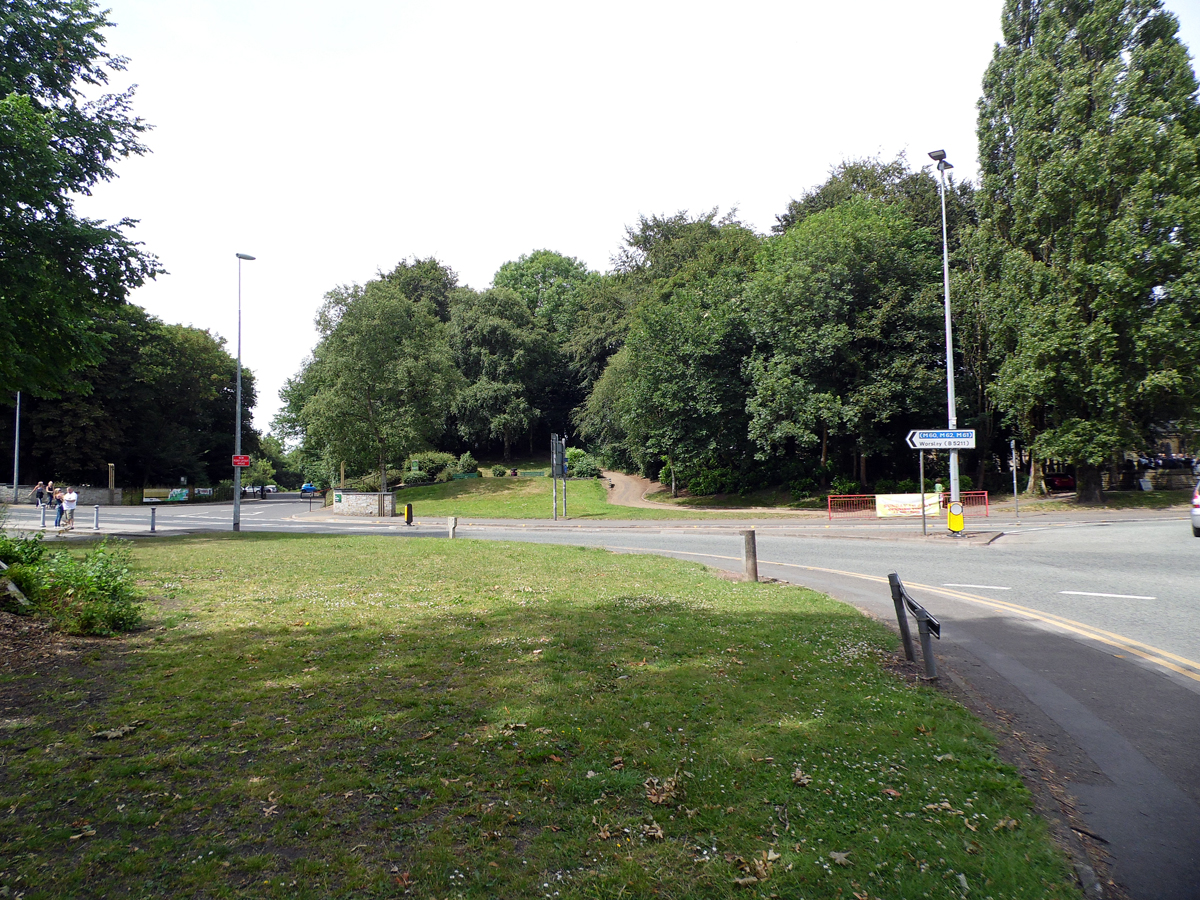
- The site of the station in 2018

General information
- Location: Monton, Salford; England
- Grid reference: SJ764995
- Platforms: 2

Other information
- Status: Disused

History
- Original company: London and North Western Railway
- Pre-grouping: London and North Western Railway
- Post-grouping: London Midland and Scottish Railway

Key dates
- November 1887: Opened
- 5 May 1969: Closed
Location

Monton Green railway station is a closed station in Eccles.

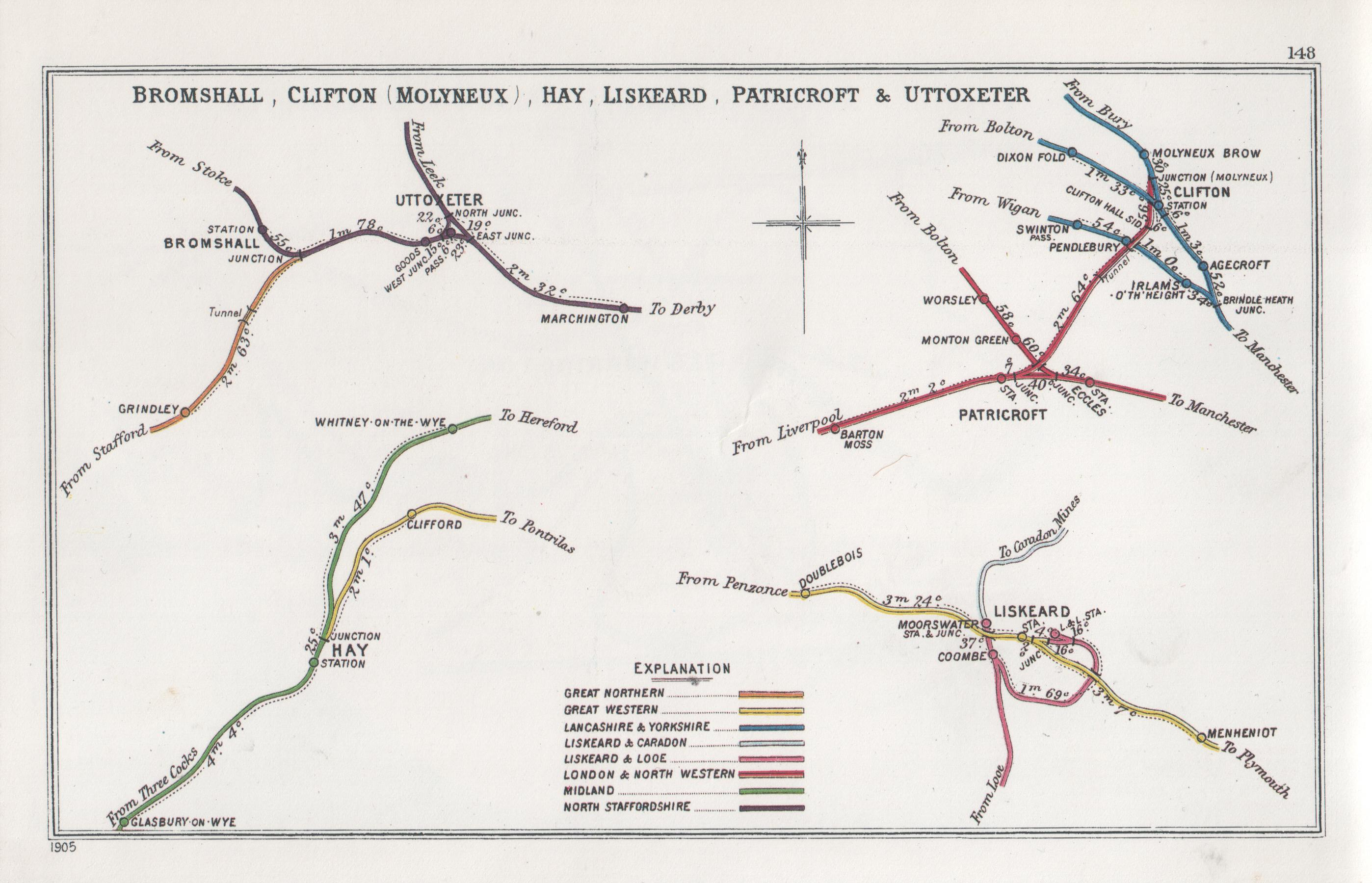
A 1905 Railway Clearing House Junction Diagram showing (upper right) railways in the vicinity of Monton Green

Opened on 1 November 1887, Monton Green was the first station on the London and North Western Railway's Manchester and Wigan Railway, which connected Eccles with Wigan and the Tyldesley Loopline which connected Tyldesley, Leigh and Kenyon Junction. Other stations on the line were located at Worsley and Ellenbrook. The station was built on an embankment at the road junctions of Canal Bank and Parrin Lane in Monton.

The Tyldesley Loopline was earmarked for closure in the Beeching Report, and Monton Green closed on 5 May 1969, along with the rest of the line.

Since closure, the embankment spanning Monton Green has been demolished. However, the embankment running parallel to the Bridgewater Canal has been preserved as part of Salford City Council's Recreation Pathways scheme. The route is popular with walkers & cyclists, as the path gives excellent views over the local area.

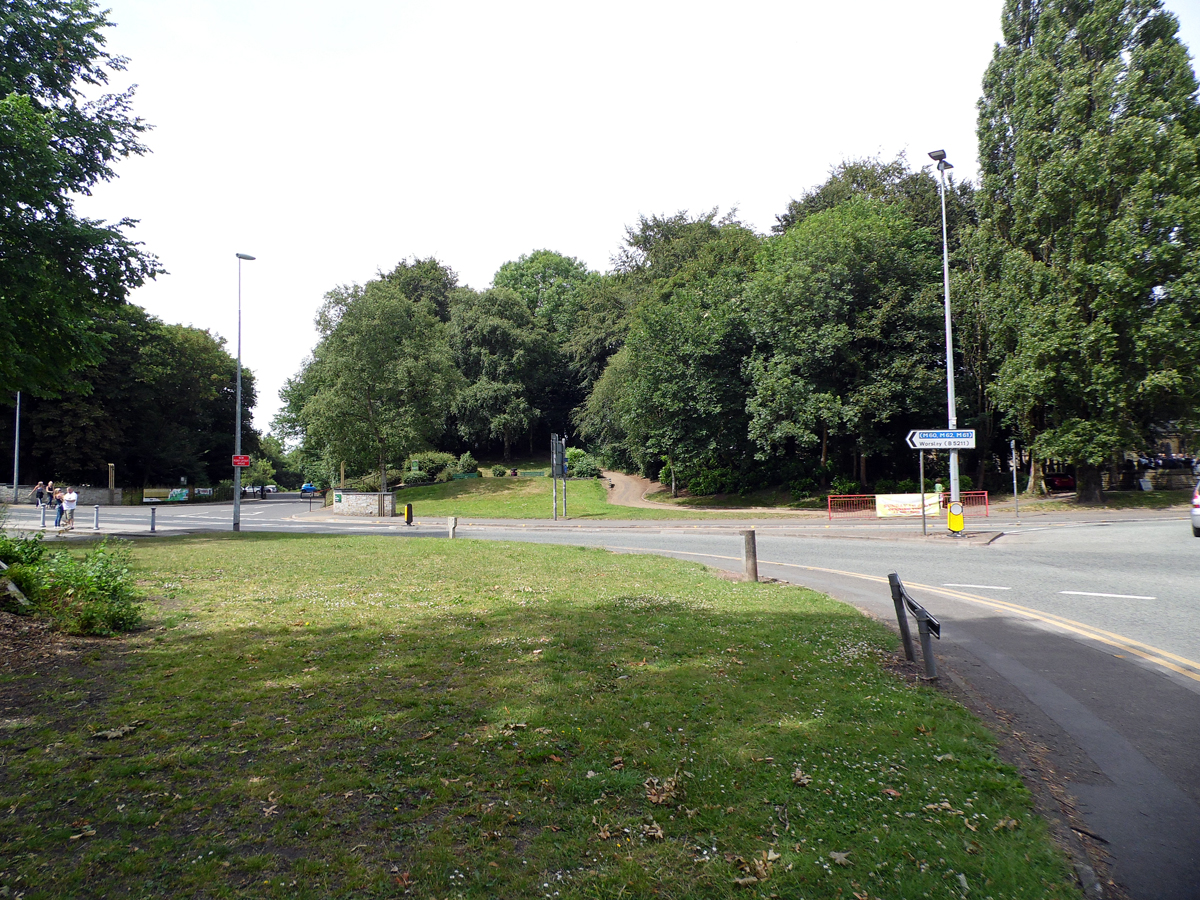
Monton Green Railway Station June 2018

| Preceding station | Disused railways | Following station |
|---|---|---|
| Worsley | LNW | Eccles |
