= John Hargreaves (carrier) =

English carrier and businessman (1780 - 1860)

- Born: John Hargreaves; 13 January 1780
- Died: 10 July 1860; Southport
- Other names: John Hargreaves senior
- Occupation: Carrier

John Hargreaves (1780 - 1860) was an English carrier and businessman. Hargreaves and his son, also John Hargreaves, were carriers in the north west of England at the time when railways were being built and taking business away from the canals.

== Early life ==
John Hargreaves was the son of John (1739 - 1796) and Ann Hargreaves (nee Hamer) who had married in 1763. Hargreaves had three siblings, an older brother James, an older sister Elizabeth and a younger brother Hamer.

The family established a carrier business at Hart Common, Westhoughton and Hargreaves's father had expanded it until it had become a substantial enterprise with "wagons to be seen on highways all over the North of England".

Hargreaves was only 16, and therefore a minor, when his father died but he was the residuary legatee of his father's estate. His inheritance was therefore held in trust until his coming of age, the trustee was Elizabeth's husband John Pennington.

Hargreaves married Tabitha Duckitt (1781 - 1847) in 1800. There were thirteen children with the eldest John (junior) being born that year. The family were based at Hart Common where the business was also based.

== Career ==
The business was primarily packhorse based, using strings of animals who could pick their way over difficult terrain that was often impassable to horse drawn wagons.

After his father's death in 1796 Hargreaves conducted business together with his mother.

The business started to change in 1808 when Hargreaves started to use the Lancaster Canal to transport goods to the North.

By 1818 Hargreaves was transporting goods from New Market St, Bolton "to Preston and all parts of the North; also to Bolton, Manchester, Bury, Rochdale, Leeds and all parts of Yorkshire". Hargreaves also operated from canal warehouse in Preston and advertised similar services including to London.

In 1830 Hargreaves was operating canal boats "from Manchester and Liverpool to Summit, a point on the Manchester and Leeds canal, from which place the communication with the Lancaster canal was made by a rail or tram road of five miles to the town of Preston, from there the route was again by canal to Lancaster and Kendal and thence by stage waggons, Scotch carts, &c., to Penrith, Carlisle, Glasgow, Edinburgh and intermediate towns. Mr. Hargreaves' stage waggons, drawn by four or six powerful horses, and his canal "fly-boats" were institutions of the country".

Father and son worked closely together as they moved into railway operations with John Hargreaves junior taking on the lease to operate the Bolton and Leigh Railway, they jointly took on the lease to operate the Kenyon and Leigh Junction Railway, but as the railways were joined this difference was at best academic as trains from one operated on the other.

They were jointly offered the lease for carrying freight on the Wigan Branch Railway in 1834, but did not initially like the rates being offered and declined. They made a counter offer which was accepted by the North Union Railway which had in the meantime been formed by an amalgamation of the Wigan Branch Railway and the Preston and Wigan Railway.

== Later life ==
Hargreaves owned property in Hindley as well as Westhoughton and was qualified to vote in both places.

Hargreaves died at the age of eighty in 1860 leaving nine surviving children, he was buried at All Saints' Chapel, Hindley, where he had been a trustee.
