= Eccles rail crash =

Eccles rail crash may refer to either of two rail collisions at Eccles, Greater Manchester, England:

- 1941 Eccles rail crash, a collision between two passenger trains in 1941
- 1984 Eccles rail crash, a collision between a passenger and a freight train in 1984
