= Leigh railway station (disambiguation) =

Leigh railway station is a station in Kent, England

Leigh railway station may refer to:

- Leigh-on-Sea railway station in Essex, England
- Leigh railway station (Staffordshire), a closed station in Staffordshire, England
- Leigh railway station (Lancashire), a closed station in Lancashire, England
- Westleigh railway station, originally called Leigh, a closed station in Lancashire, England

== See also ==
- Lee railway station in London, England
