= Chequerbent railway station (Bolton and Leigh Railway) =

Former railway station in England

Chequerbent

General information
- Location: Chequerbent, Westhoughton, Bolton; England
- Coordinates: 53.5490°N 2.4952°W
- Grid reference: SD672059

Other information
- Status: Disused

History
- Original company: Bolton and Leigh Railway
- Pre-grouping: London and North Western Railway

Key dates
- 11 June 1831: Station opened
- 2 February 1885: Station closed
Location

Chequerbent railway station was a railway station in Westhoughton to the south-west of Bolton, Greater Manchester, on the line between Bolton and Leigh. It was open from 1831 until its replacement in 1885 by a later station.

== History ==
The Bolton and Leigh Railway (B&LR) opened for goods traffic in 1828, followed by passenger services in 1831.

The railway was built as a single track line and the route included two inclines which were worked using ropes hauled by stationary engines, locomotive haulage being used on the flatter sections of the line. One of these inclines was situated north of Atherton Bag Lane railway station with the line climbing up through Chequerbent before dropping towards Bolton. This incline was operated by a 50 horsepower (37,285 W) stationary steam engine.

The station at Chequerbent opened on 11 June 1831. The station was sited south of the Turnpike road (now the A6) near to the engine winding house. The station site was not marked on contemporary maps but the engine house is clearly marked on the OS six-inch map surveyed in 1845. The station has been described as a convenient "halt" for the Hulton Family, as William Hulton was an early promoter and supporter of the railway.

To avoid these inclines, and allow steam locomotives to haul trains for the entire journey, the London and North Western Railway (LNWR), successor to the B&LR, built deviations over easier gradients. This required the resiting of several stations, including Chequerbent.

The station closed on 2 February 1885 and was replaced by a new Chequerbent only a short distance away on the same day.

Preceding station	Disused railways	Following station
Atherton Bag Lane; Line and station closed	London and North Western Railway; Bolton and Leigh line	Daubhill; Line and station closed
