= Rumworth and Daubhill railway station =

Former railway station in England

Rumworth and Daubhill

General information
- Location: Bolton, Greater Manchester, Bolton; England
- Coordinates: 53.5619°N 2.4540°W
- Grid reference: SD700073
- Platforms: 2

Other information
- Status: Disused

History
- Original company: London and North Western Railway
- Pre-grouping: LNWR
- Post-grouping: London, Midland and Scottish Railway

Key dates
- 2 February 1885: Station opened as "Daubhill"
- 28 April 1885: Renamed "Rumworth and Daubhill"
- 3 March 1952: Closed to passengers
- 29 March 1965: Closed completely
Location

Rumworth and Daubhill railway station was in the Daubhill area of south-west Bolton, Greater Manchester, on a deviation of the original Bolton Great Moor St to Kenyon Junction line. The station replaced an earlier station on the original line of the railway that had been served by a stationary engine. It was open from 1885 until 1952 for passengers and 1965 for freight.

== History ==
The Bolton and Leigh Railway (B&LR) opened for goods traffic in 1828, followed by passenger services in 1831. The original railway included two inclines worked by stationary engines, one of which was situated at Daubhill, south of Bolton Great Moor Street railway station (originally just called Bolton) with the line climbing up out of Bolton. The stationary engines played a prominent role on the line for at least 15 years and it is believed they remained in operation until about 1846. Cable haulage was discontinued once locomotive performance had improved sufficiently.

The incline at Daubhill was superseded by a deviation built by the London and North Western Railway (LNWR) in 1885, the LNWR was by then the owner and operator of the line. The deviation also enabled the LNWR to increase capacity by doubling the line. A new Daubhill railway station was built on the deviation to replace the original Daubhill station at the top of the incline. The station opened on 2 February 1885 and was renamed Rumworth and Daubhill railway station on the 28 April 1885.

The deviation ran in a cutting and the station was built with two platforms on the outsides of the tracks with the station building above reached by steps either side. The station was located at the intersection of St Helens Road and Dean Church Road, the railway ran diagonally underneath this intersection. A station had a small goods yard. Holland says this was leased for many years to the Hulton Colliery Company.

Rumworth and Daubhill closed to passengers on 3 March 1952, although local services continued to pass through until all regular passenger services from Bolton Great Moor St were withdrawn on 27 March 1954. After closure the station was demolished and the cutting in which the station was located has been infilled leaving no trace of the station or railways existence.

Preceding station	Disused railways	Following station
Bolton Great Moor Street; Line and station closed	London and North Western Railway	Chequerbent; Line and station closed
