= Chequerbent railway station =

Former railway station in England

Chequerbent

General information
- Location: Chequerbent, Westhoughton, Bolton; England
- Coordinates: 53.5505°N 2.4944°W
- Grid reference: SD673060
- Platforms: 2

Other information
- Status: Disused

History
- Original company: London and North Western Railway
- Pre-grouping: London and North Western Railway
- Post-grouping: London, Midland and Scottish Railway

Key dates
- 2 February 1885: Station opened
- 3 March 1952: Station closed to passengers
- 25 February 1965: Station closed completely
Location

Chequerbent railway station was in Westhoughton to the south-west of Bolton, Greater Manchester, on a deviation of the original Bolton Great Moor St to Kenyon Junction line. The station replaced an earlier station on the original line of the railway that had been served by a stationary engine. It was open from 1885 until 1952 for passengers and 1965 for freight.

== History ==
The Bolton and Leigh Railway (B&LR) opened for goods traffic in 1828, followed by passenger services in 1831. The original railway included two inclines worked by stationary engines, one of which was situated north of Atherton Bag Lane railway station with the line climbing up through Chequerbent before dropping towards Bolton.

The stationary engines played a prominent role on the line for at least 15 years and it is believed they remained in operation until about 1846. Cable haulage was discontinued once locomotive performance had improved sufficiently.

The incline at Chequerbent was superseded by a deviation built by the London and North Western Railway (LNWR) in 1885, the LNWR was by then the owner and operator of the line. At the same time the opportunity was taken to lay double track from Bag Lane through to Bolton.

The route of the new line passed under the A6, whereas the previous line had crossed at road level, the station was sited in a cutting on the north side of the road-over bridge, complemented by a new Station Masters house and a number of railway cottages.

The old track alignment continued in use from the north end to access Hulton Collieries.

The station opened in 1885, replacing the earlier station which had opened in 1831. The new station was sometimes known as Chequerbent for Hulton Park.

The station had two platforms reached via steps.

The station had a goods yard situated to the north of the passenger station capable of handling "Live Stock, Horse Boxes and Prize Cattle Vans, and Carriages by Passenger Train".

== Freight traffic ==
The 1885 deviation eased the gradients somewhat, but the climb northwards from Atherton Bag Lane to Chequerbent remained arduous, with a nominal gradient of 1 in 30.5 for 1.6 miles - appreciably steeper than the Lickey Incline. This gradient was, however, purely nominal, as over the years colliery subsidence resulted in a continuous climb with an uneven gradient, including a stretch at 1 in 18. This imposed severe restrictions on loads, locomotives and men and resulted in this relative backwater becoming a Mecca for cameramen and film makers as dense loads such as sand were carried well into the 1960s.

== Closures ==
The station closed to passengers in 1952, though local passenger trains continued to pass through for two more years and excursion traffic for four years after that. It finally closed completely in 1965.

The goods yard closed on 27 February 1965.

The final closure of the line through Chequerbent was in January 1969 when the last remaining section of line between Howe Bridge Junction and Hulton Sidings was closed to Freight Traffic.

| Preceding station | Disused railways | Following station |
|---|---|---|
| Atherton Bag Lane; Line and station closed | London and North Western Railway | Rumworth and Daubhill; Line and station closed |
