= Leigh railway station (Lancashire) =

Former railway station in England

Leigh

General information
- Location: Leigh, Wigan; England
- Coordinates: 53.4967°N 2.5113°W
- Grid reference: SD662001
- Platforms: 2

Other information
- Status: Disused

History
- Original company: London and North Western Railway
- Pre-grouping: London and North Western Railway
- Post-grouping: London Midland and Scottish Railway

Key dates
- 1 September 1864: Station opened as Bedford Leigh
- 1 August 1876: Station renamed as Leigh & Bedford
- 1 July 1914: Station renamed as Leigh
- 5 May 1969: Station closed
Location

Leigh was a railway station in Bedford, Leigh, Greater Manchester, England, United Kingdom, on the London and North Western Railway. Leigh was in the historic county of Lancashire. Its station opened as Bedford Leigh in 1864, was renamed Leigh & Bedford in 1876 and Leigh in 1914. The station closed in 1969.

== History ==
Leigh's railway station was on the Tyldesley Loopline, which was opened on 1 September 1864 by the London & North Western Railway. The station was named Bedford Leigh when it opened for passengers in 1864 and its name was changed to Leigh & Bedford in 1876 before becoming Leigh in 1914.

Post-grouping, the station became part of the London Midland and Scottish Railway. The station closed on 5 May 1969 leaving the town without a passenger railway (Westleigh railway station, the town's other station closed in 1954).

Coal deposits were the chief motivation for building a railway in the area and the railway's supporters included many local colliery owners and industrialists. In 1874, John Speakman sank Bedford Colliery to the north-east of the station. The colliery railway was linked to the main line at Speakman's Sidings between Bedford Leigh and Tyldesley stations in 1882.

In 1870, the station was used by 46,906 passengers, and five years later, passenger numbers had increased to 75,223. In 1894, more than 228,500 passengers were using the station.

== Location ==
Leigh station was on the Tyldesley Loopline which ran from Eccles via Tyldesley, Bedford Leigh and Bradshaw Leach (later renamed Pennington) to Kenyon Junction. When built the station was in the Atherton township because of the alignment of the ancient boundaries. In boundary changes made in 1894, this part of the Atherton township was added to Leigh Urban District. The station was built opposite the junction of East Bond Street and Princess Street to the east of Leigh town centre. The town was also served by stations at Westleigh and Atherleigh on the Bolton and Leigh Railway and at Pennington.

== Structure ==
The station as originally constructed consisted of two platforms, one on each side of the double-track line on the Leigh viaduct, a 350-yard-long structure of 22 arches that carried the railway over the eastern side of Leigh town centre and the Bridgewater Canal. The station was of timber construction with a booking office under one of the viaduct's arches. The platforms were reached from separate staircases of 43 steps and each platform, also of timber construction, had an open waiting shelter. A crossover was located to the east of the station to facilitate changing lines for trains that terminated at Leigh.

In 1875, a "Gentlemen's" waiting room was provided and a general waiting room was built next to the "Ladies" waiting room on the Manchester platform.

Work costing £17,000 to rebuild the station began in March 1896 and was expected to be finished in summer 1897, but the station was not officially reopened until 1 April 1898. The booking and parcels offices were built at the top of a new approach road on a slope up from the junction of Princess Street and East Bond Street. From the booking office at the top of the slope, covered walkway ramps accessed the platforms, which were widened and provided with an ironwork canopy over both platforms and four waiting rooms on each side. Space for the structures was created by smaller arches built on either side of the railway running lines.

The goods yard and two sheds were located at a lower level to the north, between the station and Brown Street North. In 1904 the goods yard had a full range of facilities and was able to accommodate "Furniture Vans, Carriages, Portable Engines, and Machines on Wheels; Livestock; Horse Boxes and Prize Cattle Vans; and Carriages by Passenger Train" as well as the normal goods and parcels.

== Services ==
On opening, the passenger timetable allowed for direct travel from Bedford Leigh to Manchester on eight trains on weekdays, six to Liverpool, two to Kenyon and one to Warrington, with a connection to Chester.

The timetable for 1934 shows Leigh having 23 direct weekday services to Manchester, 11 to Liverpool, 4 to Tyldesley, 4 to Wigan via Pennington Junction and 1 to Warrington. Services to Wigan via Pennington Junction stopped in 1942.

In 1947, there were five weekday trains direct to Manchester and three services requiring a change at Tyldesley and one other service to Tyldesley. In the opposite direction there were five trains to Kenyon Junction to change for trains for Liverpool. On Sundays there were four trains direct from Leigh to Liverpool.

By the 1960s, services had been rationalised and most services through Leigh were on the Manchester to Liverpool service. In 1967, 14 trains from Liverpool Lime Street to Manchester Exchange stopped at Leigh and three peak local trains operated between Leigh and Manchester Exchange.

Additional services were run during the annual holiday wakes weeks, usually the first two weeks of July. In 1958, it was possible to take a train to several stations on the North Wales coast, Blackpool, Bristol, Devon, Cornwall, Fleetwood (for the Isle of Man ferry), Holyhead (for the Dublin ferry), London Euston, Lancaster and Morecambe.

Preceding station	Disused railways	Following station
Pennington; Line and station closed	LNWR; Tyldesley Loopline	Tyldesley; Line and station closed
