= John Hargreaves (early railway operator) =

English railway operator

- Born: John Hargreaves; 22 October 1800; Westhoughton, Lancashire, England
- Died: 18 December 1874 (aged 74); Sunninghill, Berkshire, England
- Other names: John Hargreaves junior
- Occupations: Early railway operator Cotton spinner Collier; Company Director

John Hargreaves JP (22 October 1800 – 18 December 1874) was an English carrier, railway entrepreneur and manufacturing businessman. John and his father, also called John Hargreaves, were carriers in the north west of England at the time when railways were being built and taking business away from the canals.

== Personal life ==
John Hargreaves was born on 22 October 1800 in Lancashire, England. He married Mary Hick (born 1813), daughter of Benjamin Hick of Benjamin Hick & Sons, on 19 October 1836 in St Peter's Parish Church, Bolton le Moors.

The Hargreaves lived in Bolton, initially at Newport House and then at Rose Hill. Hargreaves served as a town councillor from 1845 to 1848 and was a local magistrate. In later years the Hargreaves purchased the Selwood Park (Note: also quoted as 'Gilwood Park and Silwood Park) Estate in Sunninghill, Berkshire.

Hargreaves died in 1874, aged 74, leaving eight surviving children and his widow well provided for, his fortune amounting to £600,000.

== Railway carrier ==
In the 1830s Hargreaves was already an established carrier in his own right based at Castlefield Wharf, Manchester, on the Bridgewater Canal. In these early days of railways there was no decided way about how the railway should be managed and operated, but there was a "long-established principle that a highway should be open to all comers. Established carriers were admitted to a share in railway goods traffic, using either their own or the railway companies' vehicles, though the extent to which they might do so varied greatly from line to line."

The Liverpool & Manchester Railway (L&MR), which chose to carry all goods on its own account and exclude carriers, nevertheless contracted with Hargreaves so that he had the exclusive right to all traffic to Bolton and Leigh, thereby creating a monopoly.

The Bolton and Leigh Railway had originally opened for goods traffic in 1928 and initially had carried goods itself, although allowing private individuals to work their own wagons. In 1831 when the Bolton and Leigh Railway, and the newly built connecting Kenyon and Leigh Junction Railway, opened throughout allowing the passage of trains to and from Bolton to Liverpool and Manchester via the Liverpool and Manchester Railway, both railways leased their operations exclusively to Hargreaves, who at that time owned about 200 wagons and even provided the locomotives.

Ransom reports that the "controversy went on for years over the extent to which steam railways should either admit carriers, to avoid monopoly and keep rates down, or should not admit them, so that all trains and vehicles should be under the control of the railway company in the interest of safety.... Nevertheless the 'private owner' wagon became a feature of railways in Britain, and to this day provides a reminder that public railways were originally thought of as highways open to all."

Hargreaves and his father were offered the lease for carrying freight on the Wigan Branch Railway in 1834, but they did not like the rates being offered and declined, making a counteroffer which was accepted by the North Union Railway, which had in the meantime been formed by an amalgamation of the Wigan Branch Railway and the Preston and Wigan Railway.

On 19 February 1841 Hargreaves became the carrier on the Bolton & Preston Railway and around the same time on the Lancaster & Preston Junction Railway. Hargreaves continued as a railway carrier until 1845 when the Bolton to Kenyon route was absorbed into the Grand Junction Railway (GJR). The GJR terminated the carrier contracts on 31 December 1845.

From 1840 to 1843 Hargreaves was chairman of the Bolton & Preston Railway. Hargreaves is listed as a Director of the Blackburn Railway and of the Lancashire and Yorkshire Railway in 1858.

Although Hargreaves primarily dealt with freight traffic he continued to provide passenger services between Bolton and Kenyon where passengers changed to travel on the Liverpool and Manchester Railway. He was a pioneer of innovative passenger operations, offering rail excursions. In 1841 he organised trips from Bolton to Liverpool on Sundays, and later he was advertising trips to Manchester and London.

== Other interests ==
Hargreaves and three of his brothers were also engaged in the cotton trade, forming the partnership John Hargreaves and Brothers, The Victoria Cotton Mills, Fletcher Street.

Hargreaves acquired a colliery at Coppull, Chorley, in 1842, and he leased an adjacent mine at Burgh; he worked the Coppull mine until 1862. Hargreaves used his own rolling stock to transport the coal to Preston over the North Union Railway, and when he ceased being a railway carrier in 1845 he retained two locomotives to continue the coal carriage.

In 1845 Hargreaves formed a partnership with John Hick, who took over the engineering company Benjamin Hick & Sons following the death of his father. The company was based at the Soho Foundry, Crook Street, Bolton. Hargreaves left the firm in April 1850.

== See also ==
- Sans Pareil
