= Pennington railway station =

Former railway station in England

Pennington

General information
- Location: Pennington, Wigan; England
- Coordinates: 53.4829°N 2.5346°W
- Grid reference: SJ646985
- Platforms: 2

Other information
- Status: Disused

History
- Original company: Kenyon and Leigh Junction Railway
- Pre-grouping: London and North Western Railway
- Post-grouping: London Midland and Scottish Railway

Key dates
- 11 June 1831: Station opened as Bradshaw Leach
- 1 February 1877: Renamed Pennington
- 29 March 1954: Station closed
Location

Pennington railway station served Pennington, Leigh, Greater Manchester, England on the Bolton and Leigh Railway. It was situated within the historic county of Lancashire.

The station opened as Bradshaw Leach on the Kenyon and Leigh Junction Railway in 1831 and was renamed Pennington in 1877. It closed in 1954. The line serving Leigh closed in 1969.

== History ==
Pennington Station was built when the Bolton and Leigh Railway, which reached the Leeds and Liverpool Canal in Leigh in 1830, was extended by the construction of the Kenyon and Leigh Junction Railway to meet the Liverpool and Manchester Railway at Kenyon in 1831.

In 1864 the station became a junction when the Tyldesley Loopline from Tyldesley and Leigh and Bedford, built by the London and North Western Railway, joined the Kenyon and Leigh line just to the north of Bradshaw Leach Station.

The station was renamed Pennington Station in 1877.

The London and North Western Railway built another line via Plank Lane to Platt Bridge and Wigan NW which opened in 1885 creating a three way junction.

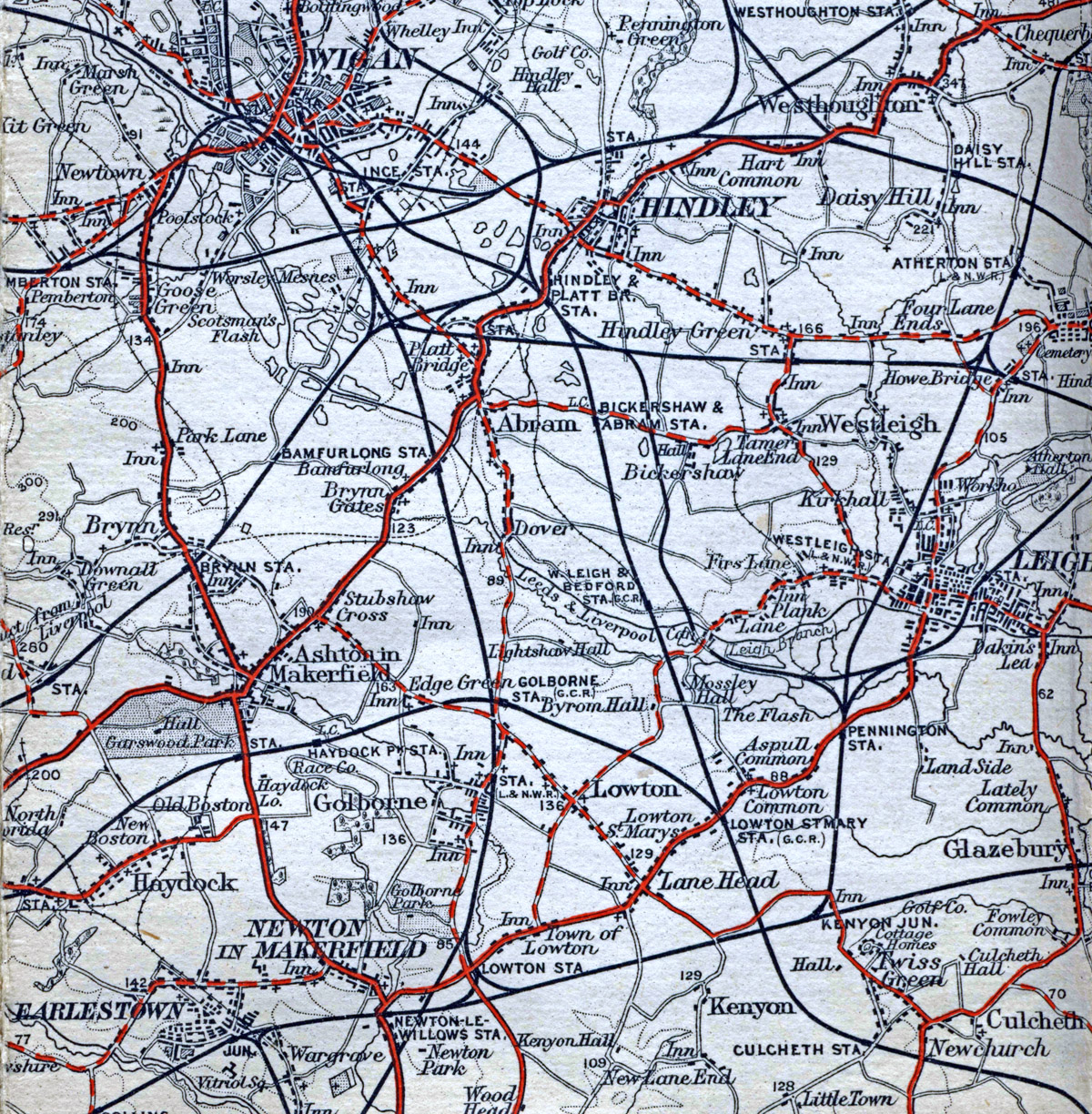
1911 Map showing the location of the station (lower centre right) and the three way junction to its north

Stations on the line became part of the London Midland and Scottish Railway in 1923, the London Midland Region of British Railways on nationalisation in 1948, and were closed by the British Transport Commission six years later in 1954 when the line to Bolton Great Moor Street Station closed. Passenger services on the Tyldesley Loopline did not stop at Pennington but all stations and the line closed following the Beeching Axe on 5 May 1969.

The line of the trackbed of the Bolton and Leigh Railway was used as the route of the A579 Leigh bypass.

== Structure ==
On opening the line was single track and the station buildings, a booking office and waiting room, were on the east side. The line between Pennington and Kenyon Junction was doubled for the opening of the LNWR line from Tyldesley in 1864 and a second platform was constructed with a timber waiting shelter on the new line to the west.

Preceding station	Historical railways	Following station
Kenyon Junction	London and North Western Railway	Plank Lane
Kenyon Junction	Kenyon and Leigh Junction Railway	Westleigh
Kenyon Junction	London and North Western Railway	Leigh
