= Kenyon and Leigh Junction Railway =

Railway company in England

Overview
- Locale: Lancashire
- Dates of operation: 1831–1845
- Successor: Grand Junction Railway

Technical
- Track gauge: 4 ft 8 1/2 in (1,435 mm) standard gauge
- Length: 2.5 miles (4.0 km)

The Kenyon and Leigh Junction Railway (K&LJR) was constructed to link the Bolton and Leigh Railway (B&LR), which terminated at the Leigh Branch of the Leeds and Liverpool Canal, with the Liverpool and Manchester Railway (L&MR) at Kenyon.

The B&LR obtained the Bolton and Leigh Railway Act 1836 (6 & 7 Will. 4. c. lii) giving it the right to lease the K&LJR in 1836. On 8 August 1845, along with the B&LR and the L&MR, the K&LJR was amalgamated into the Grand Junction Railway (GJR) which, with others, became part of the London and North Western Railway (LNWR) on 16 July 1846.

The 2.5-mile (4.0 km) line started from the B&LR's terminus in Westleigh and crossed the Leeds and Liverpool Canal before heading south towards Kenyon. Stations were built at Bradshaw Leach and Kenyon. As soon as it opened on 3 January 1831, goods trains could access 28.5 miles (45.9 km) of line between Bolton and Liverpool and a few months later a passenger service to Liverpool started. John Hargreaves, an established carrier in Bolton leased the running rights over the K&LJR and the L&MR using his own engines and rolling stock until 31 December 1845. Regular passenger services between Bolton and Kenyon ended in March 1954 and traffic from Leigh ended when the Tyldesley Loopline was closed in 1969.

== Background ==
Kenyon and Leigh Junction Railway Act 1829
- Act of Parliament
- Parliament of the United Kingdom
- Long title: An Act for making a Railway from the Bolton and Leigh Railway in the Township of West Leigh, to the Liverpool and Manchester Railway in the Township of Kenyan, with a Branch therefrom, in the County of Lancaster.
- Citation: 10 Geo. 4. c. xxxvi

Dates
- Royal assent: 14 May 1829
Other legislation
Repealed by	Grand Junction Railway Act 1845

Status: Repealed

Text of statute as originally enacted

Nine of the Kenyon and Leigh Junction Railway Company's board of 13 directors were members of the Liverpool and Manchester Railway Company. The southern end of the B&LR was near the north bank of the Leigh branch of the Leeds and Liverpool Canal where it had transhipment facilities. In 1825 the B&LR had experienced considerable opposition to its bill in Parliament and, to ensure its passing, had agreed to not cross either the Leeds and Liverpool or the Bridgewater Canals making the B&LR into a feeder for the canal. When the K&LJR presented its bill to Parliament in 1828, MPs were more amenable towards railway companies and the canal company withdrew its opposition to the railway crossing the canal. In 1829 the company received royal assent to the Kenyon and Leigh Junction Railway Act 1829 (10 Geo. 4. c. xxxvi) authorising it to build a single-track line from the end of the Bolton and Leigh Railway near Twiss (now Twist) Lane in Westleigh to Kenyon, where a junction would be made with the L&MR which was at an advanced stage of construction.

The act specified that the bridge over the canal was to have a minimum clearance of 12 feet (4 m) above the water to accommodate Mersey flats with lowered masts and its arch was to be at least 25 feet (8 m) in span accommodating a 6-foot (2 m) towpath. As compensation the K&LJR was required to pay the canal company £500 (equivalent to £49,000 in 2025 (Note: UK Consumer Price Index inflation figures from 1209–2024 based on data from "Inflation calculator", Bank of England, London, 18 February 2026)) and another £15 (equivalent to £1,000 in 2025) per day for interruptions to canal traffic during the bridge's construction. The company raised the estimated cost of the line, £22,946, (equivalent to £2,271,000 in 2025) by issuing shares.

== Construction ==
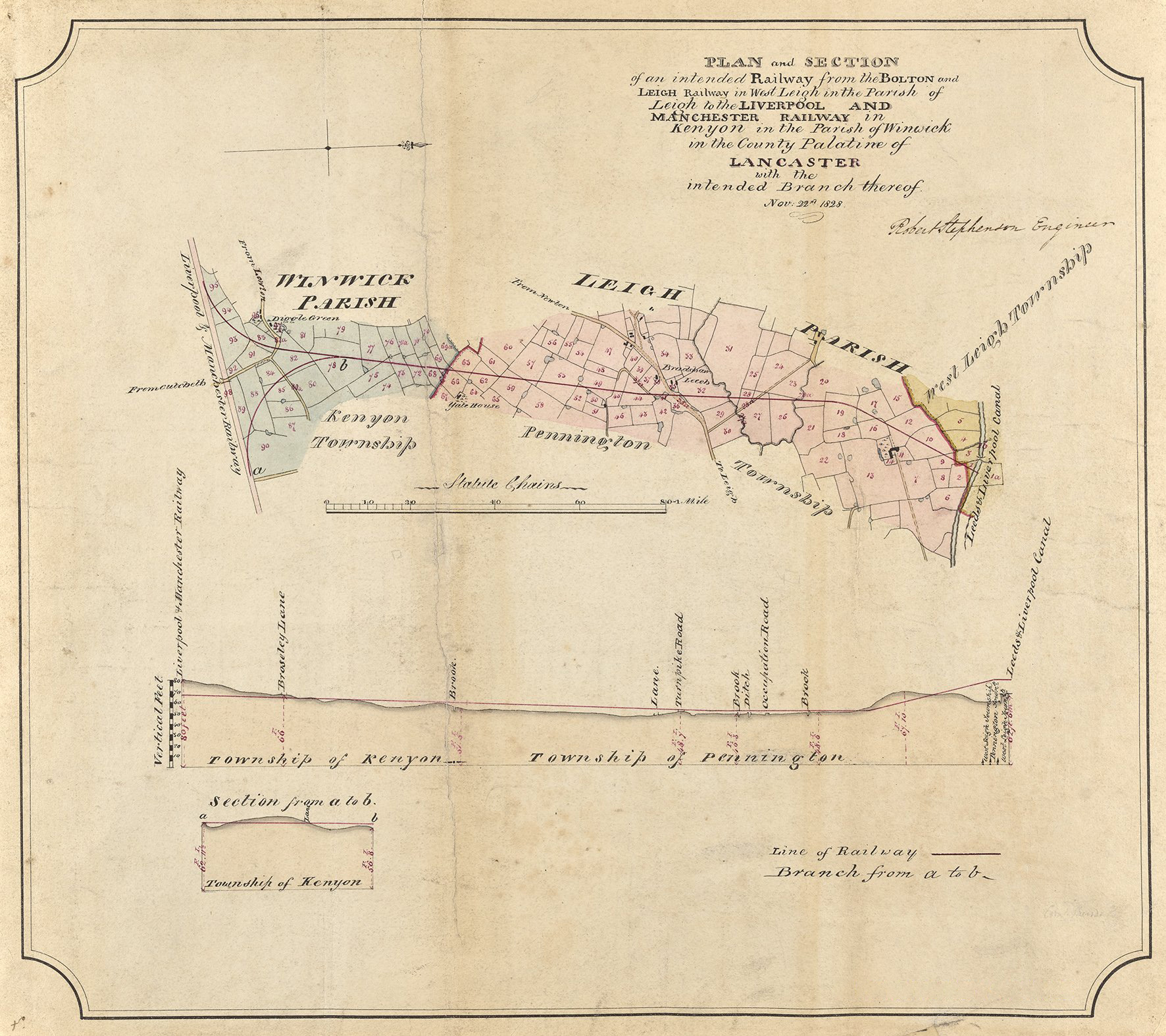
Robert Stephenson's plan for the line, dated 1828 and now in the United Kingdom Parliament's archives

The line of the railway was surveyed by Robert Stephenson and the engineer in charge was either Charles Vignoles or John Rastrick.

In September 1829 the railway company asked for tenders, in one sum, to be received by 1 October, to complete the entire railway line. Plans could be seen at the company's office in John St Liverpool or at Mr Rastrick's office in Stourbridge. The company would provide the land, wrought iron rails, cast iron rail chairs, castings and iron work for the turn outs but everything else would have to be provided including the workforce. The work involved 107,000 cubic yards of earthworks, two18-foot (5 m) bridges with 24 feet (7 m) between the parapet walls, two 6-foot (2 m) arch bridges both to 23 yards (21 m) in length, a 5-foot (2 m) arch to be 18 yards (16 m) long, 24 occupation gates, seven larger gates, five cottages for the gate keepers, about 6 miles (9.7 km) of fencing, 652 yards (596 m) of cylindrical brick culvert, sundry brickwork, 10,070 stone blocks, 20,140 oak pins, wood sleepers, gravel for the road, laying the rails and completing the line which, with branches, would be about 3 miles (4.8 km) in length.

When completed the line was 2.5 miles (4.0 km) in length. When built, it crossed the Bolton and St Helens turnpike road via a level crossing. The crossing was replaced by an overbridge when the line was doubled in 1864. The K&LJR joined the L&MR at a triangular junction. The K&LJR line towards Liverpool passed through Bolton Junction station, the line towards Manchester avoided it. The link in the Manchester direction was closed by the time the 1849 Ordnance Survey map was published.

The canal bridge was substantially rebuilt in the mid 1930s and in turn was replaced by a concrete bridge carrying the A579 Atherleigh Way in the mid 1980s. The road was built on the line of the former railway.

== Opening and operation ==
The line opened on 3 January 1831 for freight traffic between Bolton and Liverpool. A special train for "Gentlemen" ran from Bolton to Newton Races on 2 June 1831.

Passenger trains began running the 28.5 miles (45.9 km) from Bolton to Liverpool on 13 June 1831. The journey took an hour and 40 minutes The K&LJR and B&LR worked closely as trains ran over both lines to access the Liverpool and Manchester line. Two passenger trains daily ran in each direction between Bolton and Liverpool one in the morning and the other in the afternoon, each train providing inside covered accommodation and outside wooden seats in open wagons. Passengers for Manchester needed to change trains at Bolton Junction.

In 1834 the B&LR leased the running of the railway to John Hargreaves, an established carrier of Bolton. Hargreaves was granted running rights over the K&LJR and the L&MR using his own engines and rolling stock. Hargreaves was an established carrier on roads and canals before the railway was built and the main carrier from north west England into Scotland, the equal of Pickfords who controlled the trade to the south of Manchester. By the mid 1830s Hargreaves had about 200 wagons. Hargreaves became a pioneer of excursions by rail, running Sunday trips from Bolton to Liverpool as early as 1841. In 1843 he ran excursions to London and two years later to Manchester. The GJR terminated the Hargreaves leases on 31 December 1845.

Meanwhile, the B&LR obtained the Bolton and Leigh Railway Act 1836 (6 & 7 Will. 4. c. lii), giving it the right to lease the K&LJR for 25 years or purchase it for £44,750 (equivalent to £4,419,000 in 2025) in 1836.

In 1844 the Liverpool and Manchester Railway had been negotiating with the Bolton and Leigh Railway and the K&LJR with a view to an amalgamation, these negotiations were made more complicated by the initial inclusion of the North Union Railway in the proposed merger and then even more complicated when the Grand Junction Railway became interested, all the lines were connected and provided through running for each other's trains. Negotiations were reaching their conclusions when the NUR shareholders rejected their part in the amalgamation. At this juncture the K&LJR simplified the arrangements by agreeing to be purchased outright by the B&LR (under the provisions of the Bolton and Leigh Railway Act 1836) so the amalgamation took place on 8 August 1845 without the NUR and the K&LJR became part of an enlarged Grand Junction Railway under the Grand Junction Railway Act 1845 (8 & 9 Vict. c. cxcviii). (Note: Local and Personal Act, 8 & 9 Victoria I, c. cxcviii: An Act for consolidating the Bolton and Leigh, the Kenyon and Leigh Junction, the Liverpool and Manchester, and the Grand Junction Railway Companies.)

The following year on 16 July 1846 the GJR was amalgamated with others into the London and North Western Railway (LNWR).

== Stations and junctions ==
Two stations were opened on the line:

- Bolton Junction opened on 15 September 1830 on the L&MR and was renamed Kenyon Junction in June 1843. Shaw suggests that two stations may have been built at Bolton Junction, one at the terminus of the K&LJR and the L&MR station, although this may mean the platforms were not connected. Butt records a single station. (Note: Kenyon was one of the world's first railway stations. The 1849 OS map shows buildings on each line which could indicate separate stations or a single station with unconnected platforms.)
- Bradshaw Leach opened on 11 June 1831 together with the other passenger facilities on the B&LR and was renamed Pennington in 1877.

A junction was formed to the north of Pennington station in 1864 when the LNWR's Tyldesley Loopline opened via Bedford Leigh and the track between Kenyon Junction and the junction at Pennington was doubled at a cost of £7,000 (equivalent to £769,000 in 2025). Double track north from the Pennington junction to Atherton Junction opened on 31 May 1880.

In 1885 the junction with the Tyldesley Loopline, by now known as Pennington South Junction, became more complicated when the LNWR opened the Westleigh Line slightly to its north providing a connection to the Tyldesley to Wigan line at Bickershaw.

East and west junctions north of Pennington station were made in 1903 when the LNWR constructed two link lines between the Tyldesley Loopline and the Westleigh Line bridging over the Bolton & Kenyon Line and a mineral line to collieries in Westleigh.

== Closure ==
Regular passenger services on the line between Bolton and Kenyon ended on 29 March 1954 but wakes week traffic to North Wales continued until 1958. With the demise of goods traffic, Crook Street Yard in Bolton closed in April 1965 and private sidings were closed by October 1967. The only coal traffic using the line in the 1960s was from Jackson's sidings in Tyldesley. Passenger traffic from the Tyldesley Loopline closed following the Beeching cuts on 5 May 1969 when all the stations on that line were closed. The track was lifted by 1969.
