= Atherton Bag Lane railway station =

Disused railway station in Atherton, Wigan

Atherton Bag Lane

General information
- Location: Atherton, Wigan; England
- Coordinates: 53.5294°N 2.5053°W
- Grid reference: SD667038
- Platforms: 2

Other information
- Status: Disused

History
- Original company: Bolton and Leigh Railway
- Pre-grouping: London and North Western Railway
- Post-grouping: London Midland and Scottish Railway

Key dates
- 11 June 1831: Opened as Bag Lane
- 1847: Renamed Atherton
- 2 June 1924: Renamed Atherton Bag Lane
- 29 March 1954: Closed to passengers
- 7 October 1963: Closed to goods
Location

Atherton Bag Lane railway station served the town of Atherton, Lancashire, England. It was located on the Bolton and Leigh Railway line which ran from Bolton Great Moor Street to Leigh Station and the Leeds and Liverpool Canal and later to Kenyon Junction.

== History ==
The Bolton and Leigh Railway (B&LR) opened Bag Lane station as one of the original stations on the line on 11 June 1831. The B&LR became part of the Grand Junction Railway in 1845 which became part of the London and North Western Railway (L&NWR) in 1846.

The original "spartan" single platform station was constructed on the East side of the single track line in the centre of Bag Lane village, opposite the Railway Inn.

The station was renamed Atherton in 1847.

The station was rebuilt in 1880 when the line was doubled. The new station having two platforms with canopies. The platforms were accessed by an underground passage from a new road, Railway Street. There was an adjacent goods station capable of handling "Live Stock, Horse Boxes and Prize Cattle Vans". The goods yard was equipped with a 10 ton crane.

The L&NWR became part of the London Midland and Scottish Railway (LMS) during the Grouping in 1923.

The station was renamed Atherton Bag Lane on 2 June 1924 to distinguish it from Atherton Central on the Lancashire and Yorkshire Railway.

It passed on to the London Midland Region of British Railways on nationalisation in 1948 and was closed by the British Transport Commission six years later.

The line closed to all traffic in January 1969 and in 1970 the road was re-laid over its original path.

Preceding station	Historical railways	Following station
Atherleigh; Line and station closed	Bolton and Leigh Railway; London and North Western Railway	Chequerbent; Line and station closed
