= Hindley Green railway station =

Former railway station in England

Hindley Green

General information
- Location: Platt Bridge, Wigan; England
- Coordinates: 53.5204°N 2.5441°W
- Grid reference: SD640027
- Platforms: 2

Other information
- Status: Disused

History
- Pre-grouping: London and North Western Railway
- Post-grouping: London Midland and Scottish Railway

Key dates
- 1 September 1864: Station opened
- 1 May 1961: Station closed
Location

Hindley Green railway station is a closed railway station in the Hindley Green area of Wigan, England, where Leigh Road (the A578) bridged the line.

Hindley Green was within the historic county of Lancashire.

== History ==
The station was opened by the London and North Western Railway on 1 September 1864, in common with other stations on the Manchester to Wigan Line.

The station joined the London Midland and Scottish Railway during the Grouping in 1923 and passed to the London Midland Region of British Railways on nationalisation in 1948.

The station closed on 1 May 1961.

Coal deposits were the chief motivation for building a railway in the area and the railway's supporters included many local colliery owners and industrialists.

Preceding station	Disused railways	Following station
Platt Bridge	LNWR; Manchester to Wigan Line	Chowbent
