= Plank Lane railway station =

Former railway station in England

Plank Lane

General information
- Location: Between Crankwood and Plank Lane, Leigh, Wigan; England
- Coordinates: 53.4948°N 2.5609°W
- Grid reference: SD629000
- Platforms: 2

Other information
- Status: Disused

History
- Pre-grouping: LNWR

Key dates
- 1 October 1903: Station opened
- 22 February 1915: Station closed
Location

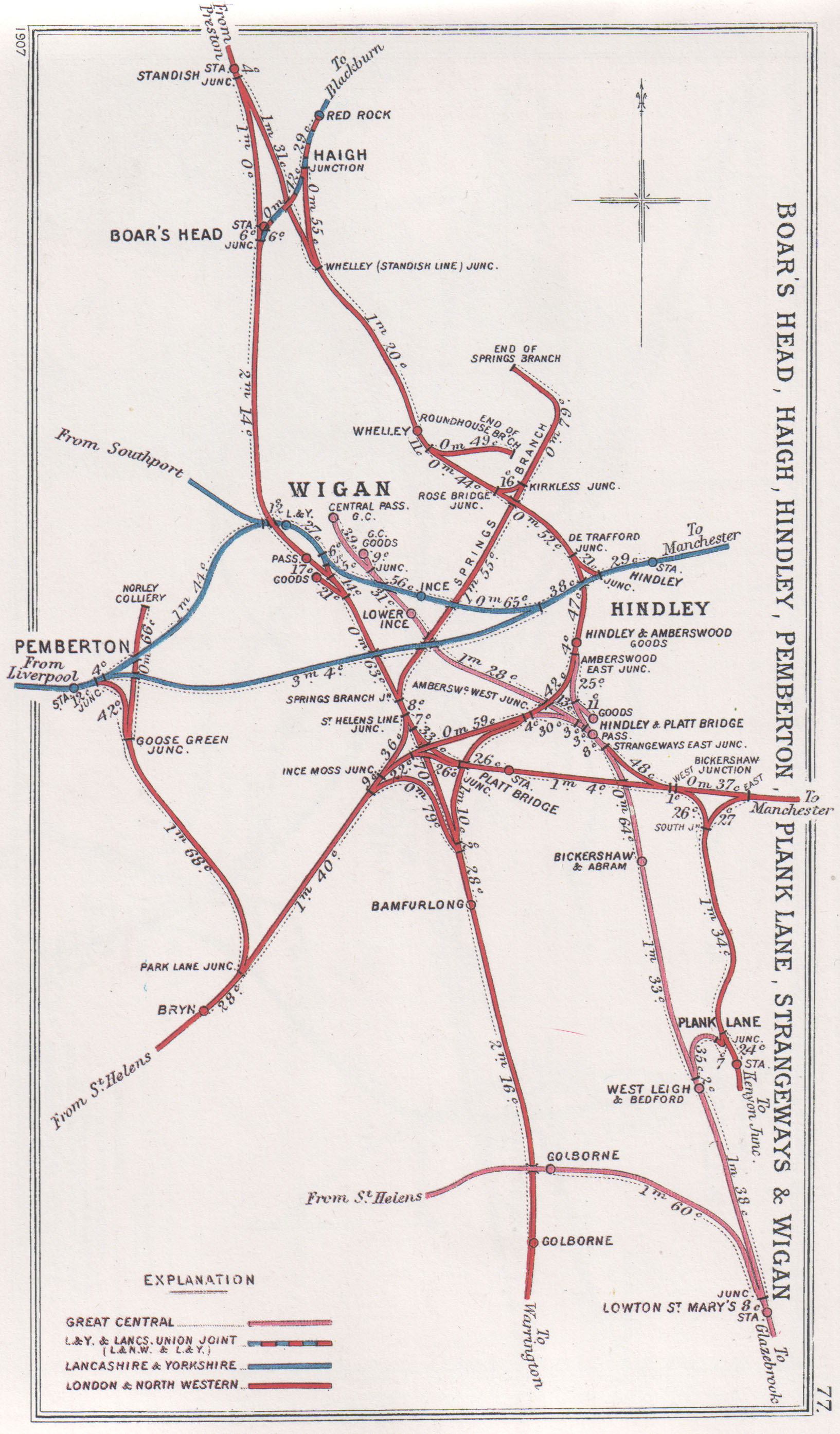
Map showing the location of Plank Lane station in the early 1900s

Plank Lane railway station served the hamlet of Crankwood and the Plank Lane area of Leigh, near Wigan in England. Like many railways, the line passed between rather than through communities, with branches off to serve the important traffic, which was goods and – in this area – coal.

== Location and nearby stations ==
The station was the only one on the Plank Lane Branch, which ran from junctions with the Eccles, Tyldesley and Wigan line south to Pennington. It was immediately north of the bridge over Crankwood Lane, which in 2015 was still a minor road.

Throughout this station's short life the GCR operated West Leigh and Bedford station a short distance to the west, on the same country lane but on a different line.

== Opening and closure ==
The station opened in 1903 and closed in 1915, never to reopen. The line survived until well after WW2 but has since been lifted and in many places obliterated.

Preceding station	Disused railways	Following station
Platt Bridge; Line and station closed	London and North Western Railway	Pennington; Line and station closed
