= Tyldesley railway station =

Former railway station in England

Tyldesley
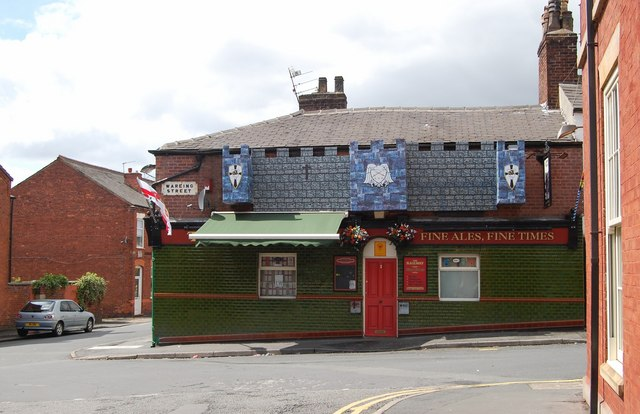
- The site of the station in 2009

General information
- Location: Tyldesley, Wigan; England
- Coordinates: 53.5124°N 2.4684°W
- Platforms: 3

Other information
- Status: Disused

History
- Original company: London and North Western Railway
- Pre-grouping: London and North Western Railway
- Post-grouping: London Midland and Scottish Railway

Key dates
- 1 September 1864: Station opens
- 5 May 1969: Station closes
Location

Tyldesley railway station is a closed railway station in Greater Manchester. It was situated within the historic county of Lancashire.

== Background ==
Coal mining was the chief motivation for building a railway in the area and the railway's supporters included many local colliery owners and industrialists. The London and North Western Railway obtained an Act of Parliament to build a line through Tyldesley in 1861 and the first sod was cut by the Earl of Ellesmere at Worsley in the September. At that time the Tyldesley had the largest population of all the townships in the old Leigh parish and was destined to become the lin‌e's "premier station".

At a junction to the west of Tyldesley station, the line to Wigan headed north west and the branch to Bedford Leigh, Bradshaw Leach and Kenyon Junction headed south west.

== History ==
The ceremonial opening of the line took place on 24 August 1864. A special train of 18 coaches decorated with flags set off from Hunt's Bank in Manchester before stopping at Eccles, Worsley and Ellenbrook. The streets of Tyldesley were decorated with flags and banners and the population crowded to greet the train which left for Bradshaw Leach. The train returned to Tyldesley and set out for Wigan via Chowbent, Hindley and Platt Bridge before once again returning to Tyldesley. Here the railway directors and their guests joined a procession around the town led by a band, members of local friendly societies and more than 2,000 children.

Tyldesley station, in common with other stations on the Manchester to Wigan Line, was opened to the public on 1 September 1864.

The station joined the London Midland and Scottish Railway during the grouping in 1923. It passed to the London Midland Region of British Railways on nationalisation in 1948. The station closed on 5 May 1969.

== Structure ==
Tyldesley station was of timber construction, it had a booking office and first and second class waiting rooms. It had three through platforms, each was 300 feet long and protected by glass canopies. Two platforms were on an island platform reached by a subway. A goods station was built to the east.

== Coal ==
Collieries linked to the railway include Astley and Tyldesley Collieries' St George's, Nook and Gin Pit Collieries in Tyldesley connected at Jackson's sidings to the west of the station and the Shakerley, Green's Tyldesley Coal Company and Ramsden's Shakerley Collieries had connections at sidings approximately one mile to the east of Tyldesley station.

== Closure ==
The Tyldesley Loopline closed following the Beeching Axe on 5 May 1969 and Tyldesley and all other stations along the line were closed.

The former trackbed within the Metropolitan Borough of Wigan was reserved in the Unitary Development Plan in case the rail route could be reinstated. The cutting in Tyldesley was filled in and the line of the railway was a footpath. The proposal for the Leigh-Tyldesley area, a guided bus along the former trackbed from Leigh to the A580 East Lancashire Road at Ellenbrook was approved in 2005. Construction of the Leigh-Salford-Manchester Bus Rapid Transit route through the site of the station was completed and opened in April 2016

Preceding station	Disused railways	Following station
Howe Bridge	London and North Western Railway	Ellenbrook
Leigh	London and North Western Railway	Ellenbrook
