= Eccles railway station =

Railway station in Greater Manchester, England

Eccles
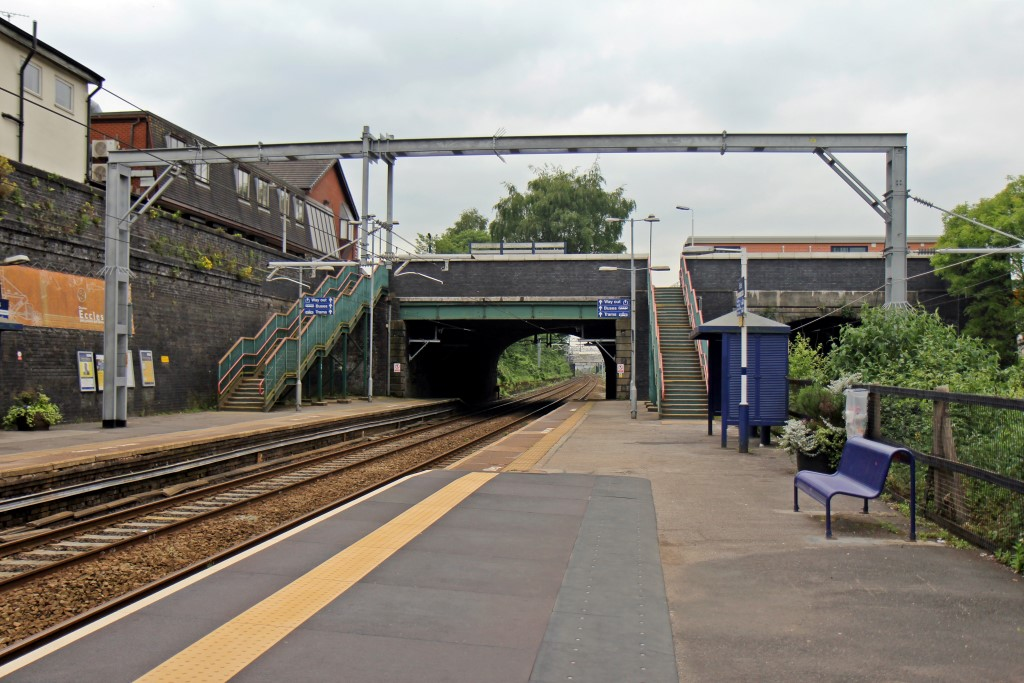
- Eccles railway station in 2014 after electrification of the northern Liverpool-Manchester Line.

General information
- Location: Eccles, Salford; England
- Coordinates: 53.485°N 2.335°W
- Grid reference: SJ778988
- Managed by: Northern Trains
- Transit authority: Greater Manchester
- Platforms: 2

Other information
- Station code: ECC
- Classification: DfT category E

History
- Original company: Liverpool and Manchester Railway
- Pre-grouping: London and North Western Railway
- Post-grouping: London, Midland and Scottish Railway

Key dates
- 15 September 1830: Station opened

Passengers
- 2020/21: ▼51,670
- 2021/22: ▲0.165 million
- 2022/23: ▲0.216 million
- 2023/24: ▲0.238 million
- 2024/25: ▲0.257 million
Location
Notes
- Passenger statistics from the Office of Rail and Road

Eccles railway station serves the town of Eccles, Greater Manchester, England. It was opened on 15 September 1830 by the Liverpool and Manchester Railway (L&M).

== Location ==
The station is next to the M602 motorway and is 300 metres north of Eccles Interchange, a bus and Metrolink interchange. A short freight-only branch line diverges from the main line here, which descends into the Manchester Ship Canal docks at Salford Quays to serve a Blue Circle cement terminal. The branch now occupies the former slow lines formation, as the L&M was formerly quadruple track from here to Manchester (the Manchester and Wigan Railway route to Tyldesley and Wigan North Western shared the tracks of the L&M to a point just west of the station here before diverging towards Worsley). The old slow line platforms can just be made out, though they are fenced off and heavily overgrown (the lines themselves were mostly lifted in the early 1970s, apart from the docks branch). The substantial street-level buildings built by the London & North Western Railway were also demolished in 1971, after being seriously damaged by fire.

== Facilities ==
The station is staffed part-time, with a small ticket office (rebuilt in the summer of 2013) at street level. The ticket office is open in the morning and early afternoon six days per week (06:25 to 12:55 weekdays, 07:25 to 13:55 Saturdays, closed Sundays). A ticket machine is available outside these times and for collecting pre-paid tickets. There are basic shelters, digital information screens and timetable poster boards on each platform, along with a P.A system to provide automated train running announcements (the information screens, CCTV cameras & P.A. speakers were installed in September 2015). Step-free access is not possible to either platform, as they can only reached by staircases from the road above.

== Services ==
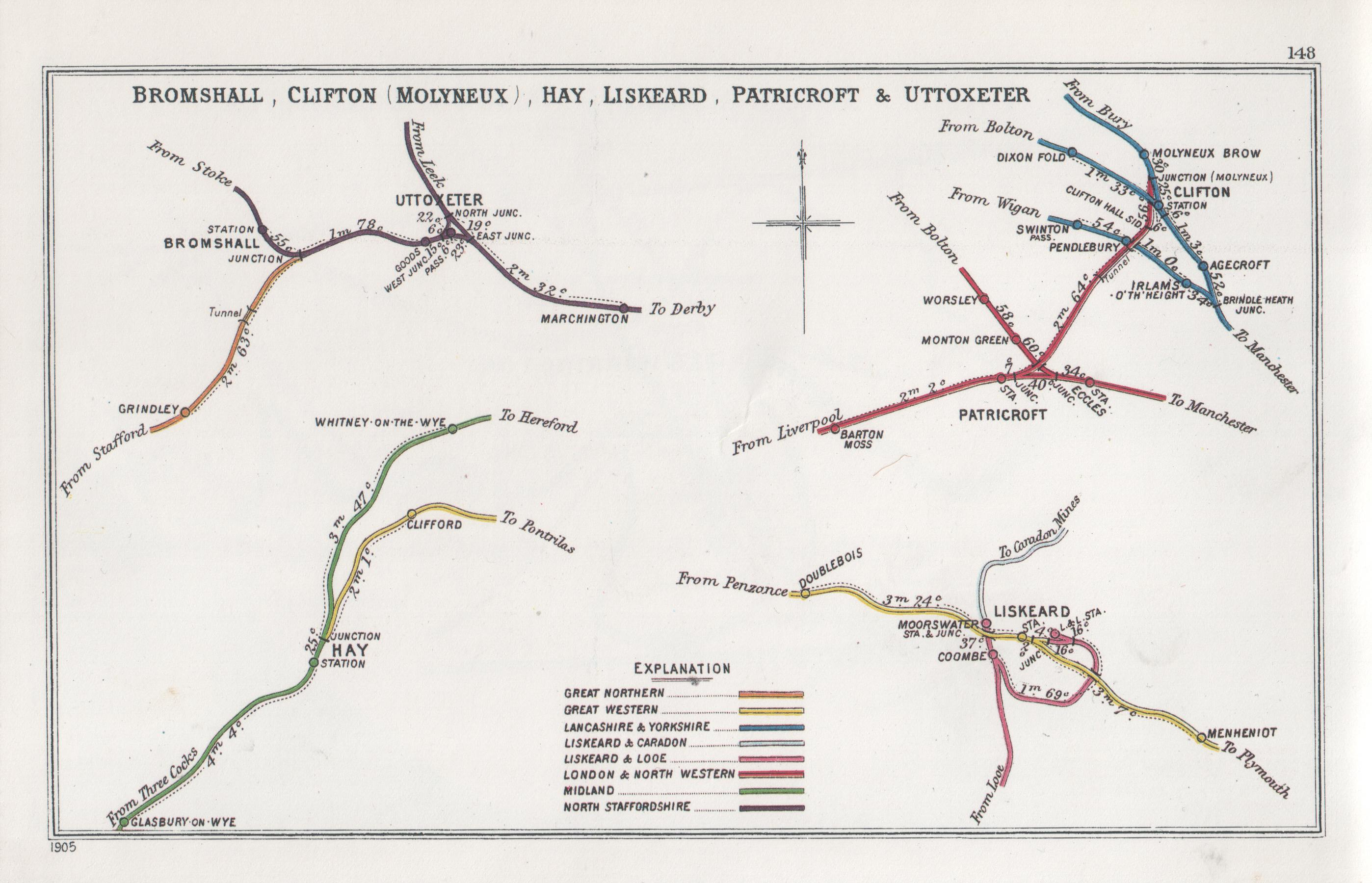
A 1905 Railway Clearing House Junction Diagram showing (upper right) railways in the vicinity of Eccles

Monday to Saturdays there is generally an hourly service from Eccles to Manchester Piccadilly and Manchester Airport eastbound and Liverpool Lime Street westbound. Extra trains run at peak periods, with a handful of services to/from Manchester Victoria. A small number of through trains to Chester and Leeds via Bradford Interchange also stop here on weekdays since the May 2019 timetable change.

Since December 2022, a limited weekday peak only service operates between Wigan North Western and Manchester Victoria that calls here.

On Sundays, the service runs between Liverpool Lime Street and Wilmslow via Manchester Piccadilly and the Airport, though whilst Lime Street station was closed for remodelling in June and July 2018 a temporary timetable was in operation (with trains running between Huyton and Victoria only in the evening and at weekends).

The station used to be served by North Wales services in the morning peak but this has now ceased. However, with the creation of the MediaCityUK complex in Salford Quays, a much more frequent pattern of services stopping at Eccles has now been reviewed.

In May 2024, FirstGroup put forward a proposal for services through from Rochdale to London Euston via Warrington Bank Quay that would stop at Eccles. If approved, services could begin in 2027.

== See also ==
- Eccles rail crash (1941) at the east end of the station in which 23 people were killed.
- Eccles rail crash (1984)

Preceding station	National Rail	Following station
Patricroft	Northern Trains; Northern Route (Chat Moss)	Deansgate
	Historical railways	
Patricroft; Line and station open	London and North Western Railway	Weaste; Line open, station closed
	Disused railways	
Monton Green	LNWR	Weaste
