= Atherleigh railway station =

Disused railway station in Leigh, Wigan

Atherleigh

General information
- Location: Leigh, Wigan; England
- Coordinates: 53.5077°N 2.5208°W
- Grid reference: SD656013
- Platforms: 2

Other information
- Status: Disused

History
- Original company: London Midland and Scottish Railway
- Post-grouping: London Midland and Scottish Railway

Key dates
- 14 October 1935: Station opened
- 29 March 1954: Station closed completely
Location

Atherleigh railway station served an area of Leigh in what was then Lancashire, England. It was located on the Bolton and Leigh Railway line which ran from Kenyon Junction to Bolton Great Moor Street.

== History ==
Opened by the London Midland and Scottish Railway to serve local housing estates built after World War 1. The station was located on the west side of the railway at Westbourne Avenue with a connecting footbridge between the two parts of the road.

The station structure was a simple wooden building. There was a platform on each side of the tracks.

The station passed on to the London Midland Region of British Railways on nationalisation in 1948, only to be closed by the British Transport Commission six years later.

== After closure ==
The station is believed to have been used for Rugby League specials and holiday traffic after closure.

By 2015 the station site was buried under the A579 road.

Preceding station	Historical railways	Following station
Westleigh; Line and station closed	London Midland and Scottish Railway	Atherton Bag Lane; Line and station closed
