= Crook and Dean =

- Industry: Engineering
- Founded: c.1821
- Founder: John Crook and William Dean
- Headquarters: Little Bolton, England
- Products: Steam locomotives, iron and brass founders

Crook and Dean of Little Bolton, England, was an engineering company established around 1821. The partners were John Crook and William Dean (c.1798-1840) who should not be confused with the better-known William Dean (1840-1905).

Pigot and Co.'s National Commercial Directory for 1828-9 described the company as: "Iron and brass founders, manufacturers of steam engines, hydraulic presses, weighing and mill machines, gas light apparatus, sugar mills and constructors of fire proof buildings".

In 1831, the company built the steam locomotives Salamander and Veteran for the Bolton and Leigh Railway. There may have been a third locomotive, Phoenix.

William Dean died on 12 July 1840 and the fate of the company is unknown.
