= Daubhill railway station =

Former railway station in England

Daubhill

General information
- Location: Bolton, Greater Manchester, Bolton; England
- Coordinates: 53.5637°N 2.4478°W
- Grid reference: SD703075
- Platforms: 2 (island)

Other information
- Status: Disused

History
- Original company: Bolton and Leigh Railway
- Pre-grouping: London and North Western Railway

Key dates
- 18 June 1831: Station opened
- 2 February 1885: Station closed
Location

Daubhill railway station was a station on the original route of the Bolton and Leigh Railway. It served the Daubhill area of south west Bolton. It was open from 1831 until its replacement in 1885 by a later station.

== History ==
The Bolton and Leigh Railway (B&LR) opened for goods traffic in 1828, followed by passenger services in 1831.

The railway was built as a single track line and the route included two inclines which were worked using ropes hauled by stationary engines, locomotive haulage being used on the flatter sections of the line. One of the inclines was situated at Daubhill with the line climbing up out of Bolton. This incline was operated by a 20 horsepower (14,914 W) stationary steam engine which hauled the trains up the incline, in the downhill direction trains worked by gravity.

The station at Daubhill opened on 11 June 1831. The station site was not marked on contemporary maps, however the approximate site can be deduced:

- A traveller in 1846 wrote to Herepath's Railway Journal with several complaints about the railway which had recently been taken over by the LNWR, one complaint read "passengers going to the Daubhill station, are compelled to go up a flight of some forty steps (frequently through a cloud of smoke and steam), alongside of, and over the top of a high-pressure boiler, which has been in use during the last 14 or 16 years." The engine house is clearly marked on the OS six-inch map surveyed between 1844 and 1846.
- Shaw (1983) reports that the first Daubhill station was situated alongside Tootal's "Sunnyside Mills" (opened in 1862) and that Tootal had in their offices a watercolour of their Mills, painted in 1864 showing the original Daubhill station and a passenger train proceeding up the line.

Improvements in locomotive design meant the inclines became redundant, to avoid the incline, and allow steam locomotives to haul trains for the entire journey, the LNWR, successor to the B&LR, built a deviation over easier gradients which required the resiting of the 1831 Daubhill station. The station closed on 2 February 1885 and was replaced by a new Rumworth and Daubhill only a short distance away on the same day.

The original Daubhill line was not simply closed, but sections at both ends were retained for many years, with only a short central section being closed and lifted immediately. The northern end was retained to serve the Crown Brewery (later Magee, Marshall's). The southern end of the old line survived to serve Sunnyside Mills and Daubhill Coal yard until the mid-1960s.

| Preceding station | Disused railways | Following station |
|---|---|---|
| Bolton Great Moor Street; Line and station closed | London and North Western Railway; Bolton and Leigh Railway | Chequerbent 1831; Line and station closed |
