= Westleigh railway station =

Former railway station in England

Westleigh

General information
- Location: Leigh, Wigan; England
- Coordinates: 53.4985°N 2.5268°W
- Grid reference: SD651003
- Platforms: 2

Other information
- Status: Disused

History
- Original company: Bolton and Leigh Railway
- Pre-grouping: London and North Western Railway
- Post-grouping: London Midland and Scottish Railway

Key dates
- 13 June 1831: Station opened as "Leigh"
- 1 August 1876: Renamed "West Leigh" or "Westleigh"
- 29 March 1954: Station closed
Location

Westleigh or West Leigh was a station in Leigh, Greater Manchester, England on the Bolton and Leigh Railway line. Westleigh was situated within the historic county of Lancashire. Its station opened in 1831 and closed in 1954.

== History ==
The Bolton and Leigh Railway reached Leigh in 1830 and was extended by the construction of the Kenyon and Leigh Junction Railway, which received Royal Assent in 1829, to Kenyon Junction by 1831 creating a junction with the Liverpool and Manchester Railway. The station at Westleigh was named Leigh when it opened for passengers in 1831 and its name changed in 1876. Following amalgamations, from 1846 it was owned by the London & North Western Railway.

== Structure and operations ==
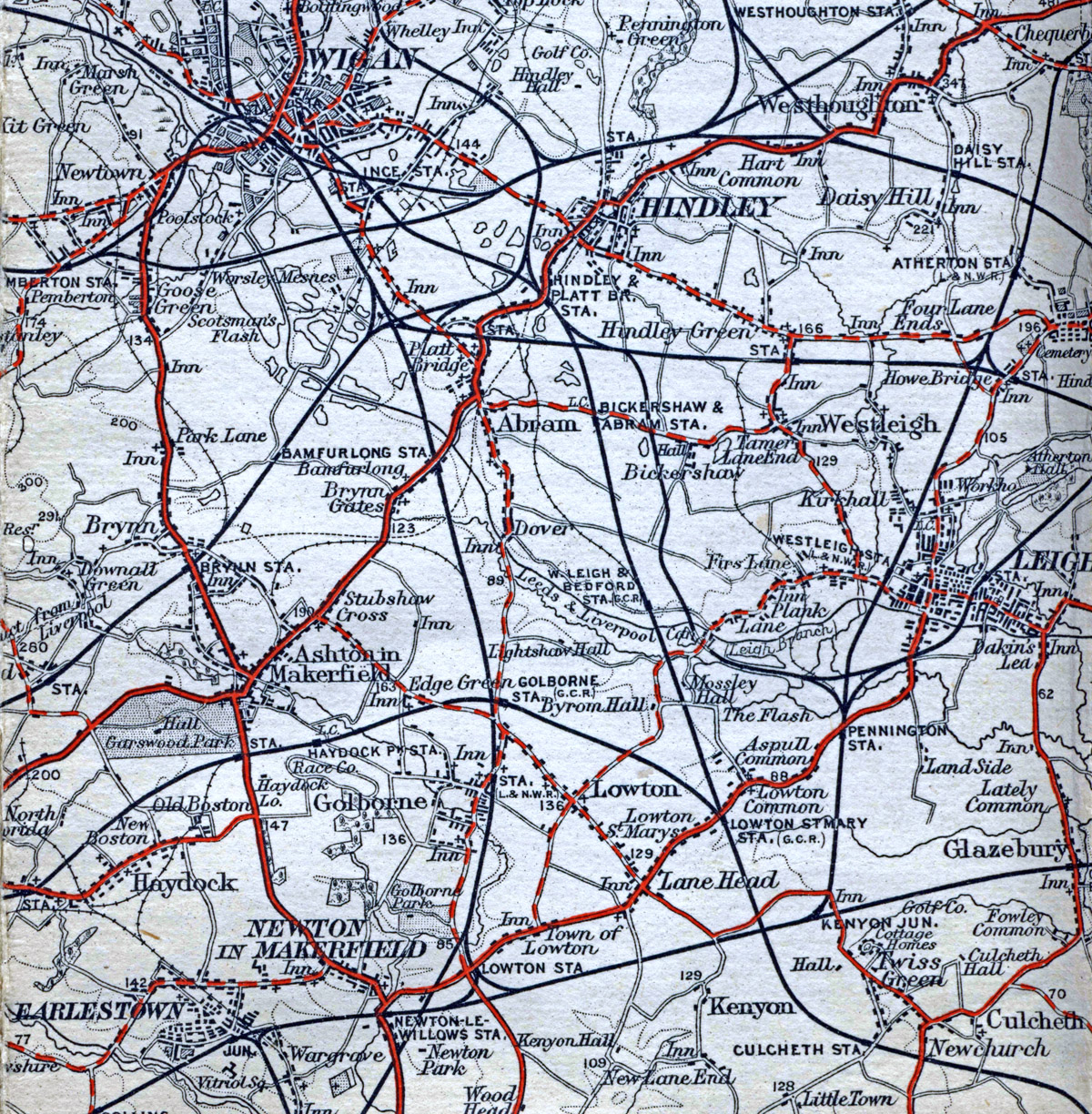
1911 map showing the station's location (centre right) to the west of Leigh and south of Westleigh

Sweeney reports that 3,393 tickets were issued at Leigh during the holiday week of 1852. Special trains were run to Newton races and in 1859 fast excursion trains picked up passengers at Leigh on the way to Holyhead to see Brunel's Great Eastern steamship.

West Leigh had both passenger and a goods stations. The passenger station had two platforms. The goods station was on the west side of the line and had a 2 ton capacity crane. Sweeney reports the goods yard closed in 1864 when the yard at Bedford Leigh station opened but it is still listed in by the Railway Clearing House in 1904.

In the 1930s up to 20 trains per day operated between Kenyon Junction and Bolton via Westleigh. Stations on the line became part of the London Midland and Scottish Railway in 1923 and the London Midland Region of British Railways on nationalisation in 1948. They were closed by the British Transport Commission six years later in 1954 when the line to Bolton Great Moor Street closed.

Holiday excursion trains and Rugby League specials called at the station up to 1958.

Preceding station	Historical railways	Following station
Pennington; Line and station closed	Bolton and Leigh Railway; London and North Western Railway	Atherleigh; Line and station closed
