= 1984 Eccles rail crash =

Collision between passenger and freight trains

Coordinates: 53°29′05″N 2°19′15″W

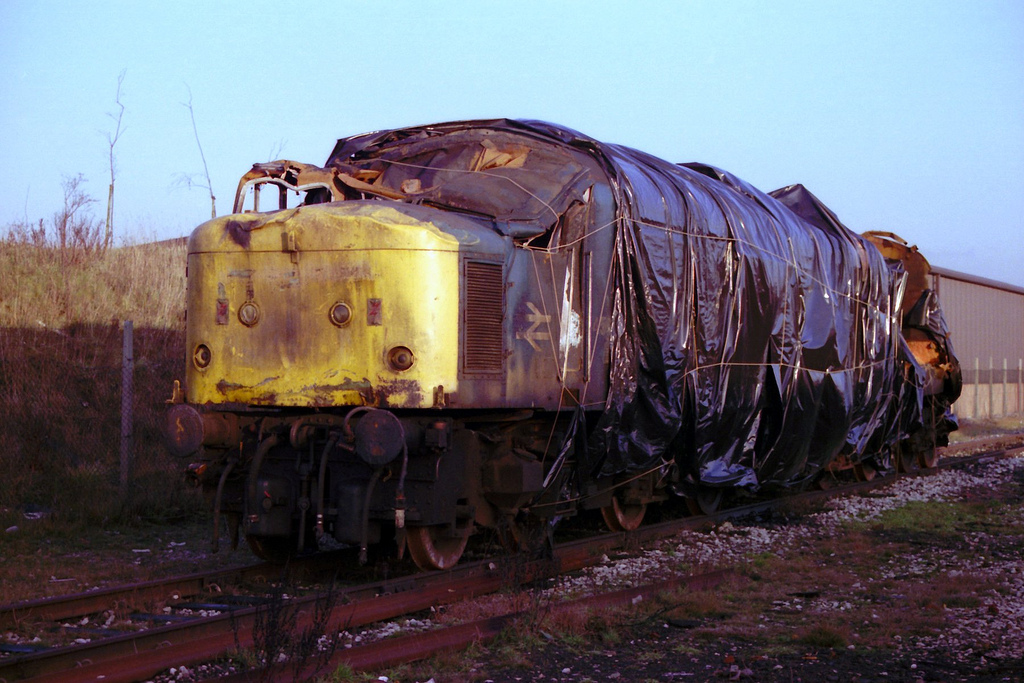
- The badly damaged locomotive of the passenger train. It was later scrapped on site.

Details
- Date: 4 December 1984; 10:37
- Location: Eccles, Greater Manchester
- Country: England
- Line: Liverpool to Manchester Line
- Incident type: Collision
- Cause: Driver's error

Statistics
- Trains: 2
- Deaths: 3
- Injured: 68

The 1984 Eccles rail crash occurred on 4 December 1984 at Eccles, Greater Manchester, when an express passenger train collided at speed with the rear of a freight train of oil tankers. The driver of the express and two passengers were killed, and 68 people were injured. The cause of the accident was determined to be that the driver of the express train had passed a signal at danger.

== The accident ==
The passenger train involved was 1E79, the 10:05 service from Liverpool Lime Street to Scarborough, formed of a Class 45 diesel locomotive No. 45147, seven passenger coaches and a parcels van. The freight train was 6E85, the 09:00 service from Stanlow Oil Refinery, Ellesmere Port to Leeds, composed of a Class 47 locomotive No. 47310 and fifteen tanker wagons containing fuel oil.

At around 09:00 on the morning of 4 December, the signalman at Eccles signal box found that, due to the maintenance crew adjusting rail gaps, a track circuit had failed, meaning that the Up signal section (number ES51) could not be cleared. As a result, all trains heading towards Manchester would have to be stopped and the drivers to be told to pass the signal at danger.

Shortly after 10:29, the freight train slowed down and stopped beside the Up section signal. At 10:35, when the driver telephoned the signal box, the signalman instructed him to pass the signal at Danger. Meanwhile, the signal preceding the freight train (number ES50), located just after Eccles station, was kept at the Danger aspect, the signalman anticipating the express train to stop. Following the telephone conversation, the signalman noticed the express train passed by the signal at full speed, with no attempt to apply the brakes.

The freight train was starting to accelerate away when the passenger train, having passed both the Eccles distant signal at caution and home signal at danger, collided heavily with its rear at 10:37. It was estimated that the freight train was travelling at about 10mph, whilst the passenger train's speed was estimated to be between 50 and 60mph.

The force of the collision threw the rearmost tanker to the side, but the next two wagons were thrown into the air, with one falling back onto the passenger locomotive. The wagons were badly damaged and escaping fuel oil was ignited by the hot exhaust gases of the locomotive, setting fire to it and the leading two coaches. Fortunately, the leading coach was empty of passengers or the death toll would probably have been much higher. However, the express driver and one passenger were killed instantly, whilst another passenger succumbed to injuries a month later. A number of people received impact injuries and burns and many were also treated for smoke inhalation. Rescue efforts were assisted by the location of the accident, which was adjacent to the M602 motorway, enabling easy access for emergency services.

== The inquiry ==
The inquiry into the accident was inconclusive. There had been problems with the signalling in the area, and track circuits had been affected by a maintenance gang working on the track nearby, but the inspector was satisfied that the signals which had been passed at danger were working properly and showing the correct aspects. They were, however, not fitted with the AWS warning system to alert the driver to his error. In the absence of any conflicting medical evidence, the inquiry was forced to conclude that the driver had simply allowed his attention to wander and had missed the Eccles signals – it was testified by staff that it was rare for these signals to be at danger.

The report recommended that these signals be fitted with AWS, work which was quickly completed. The home signal was also fitted with a white backplate, in order to make it more visible against the road bridge that stands behind it.
