= 1941 Eccles rail crash =

Collision between two trains in England

Coordinates: 53°29′07″N 2°19′52″W

Eccles rail crash 1941

Details
- Date: 30 December 1941; 08:18
- Location: Eccles, Lancashire
- Country: England
- Line: Liverpool to Manchester Line
- Operator: London Midland and Scottish Railway
- Incident type: Collision
- Cause: Signal passed at danger, fog, error in working practices

Statistics
- Trains: 2
- Deaths: 23
- Injured: 57

The 1941 Eccles rail crash occurred on 30 December 1941 at the east end of Eccles railway station in Lancashire, England.

== Events ==
A westbound train (Note: The 06:30 from Rochdale to Pennington) passed danger signals in fog in the wartime blackout and collided at about 30 mph with an eastbound train (Note: The 06:53 from Kenyon Junction to Manchester Exchange) traversing a crossover. A major contributory cause was that the signalman had erroneously suspended "fog working", which would give greater distances between trains, due to a misunderstanding about whether fogmen were on duty. The fog was worsened by the nearby Manchester Ship Canal and visibility was as low as 10 yards (9 m).

== Inquiry ==
An inquiry into the accident was opened on 7 January 1942.

At the conclusion of the Inquiry the Ministry of Transport Inspector blamed the signalman for the accident. The Rochdale train should not have been permitted to go towards the occupied junction, which was caused by the signalman not observing the block regulations and a confusion over which fogmen were on duty. The driver was also held partly to blame for his speed in low visibility conditions which would not allow him to observe the signals. The Inspector also noted that if the trains had been fitted with an automatic train control system, which had been recently trialled by the LMS in the London area, it would have prevented the collision in the fog.

== Victims ==
Initial reports were at least 15 people were killed and 100 injured; some later died in hospital and a total of 23 people were killed and 57 had serious injuries.
