= Ellenbrook railway station (Worsley) =

Former railway station in England

Ellenbrook

General information
- Location: Ellenbrook, Salford; England
- Coordinates: 53.5120°N 2.4135°W
- Grid reference: SD726018
- Platforms: 2

Other information
- Status: Disused

History
- Original company: London and North Western Railway
- Pre-grouping: London and North Western Railway
- Post-grouping: London Midland and Scottish Railway

Key dates
- 1 September 1864: Station opened
- 2 January 1961: Station closed
Location

Ellenbrook railway station was a railway station serving the Ellenbrook area of Worsley, Greater Manchester, England on the Tyldesley Loopline and Manchester and Wigan line.

Preceding station	Disused railways	Following station
Tyldesley	LNWR; Manchester to Wigan Line	Worsley
