= Manchester and Wigan Railway =

The Manchester and Wigan Railway was a railway in North West England, opened in 1864 and closed to passengers on 3 May 1969, which was part of the London and North Western Railway before the Grouping of 1923. This route was an alternative to the surviving route through Swinton, Walkden and Atherton (which was part of the Lancashire & Yorkshire Railway before 1923).

== Route ==
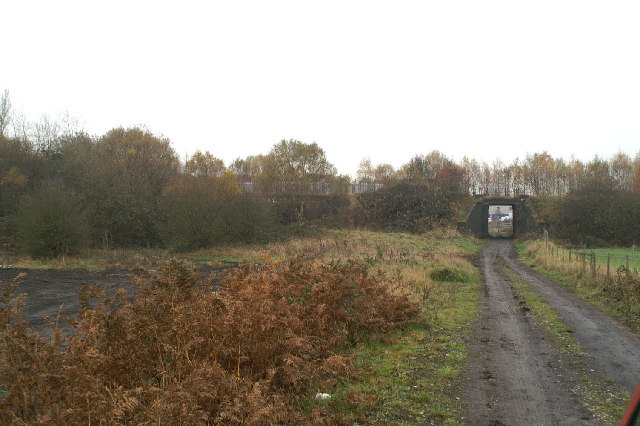
A bridge of the disused line west of Platt Bridge

The first part of the route remains between Manchester Victoria and Eccles on part of the original Liverpool and Manchester Railway opened in 1831. After Eccles, the line branched off in a north westerly direction crossing what is now the M602 motorway, calling at stations at Monton Green and Worsley. After Roe Green the line split, with one branch continuing to Bolton; and the Manchester to Wigan line continuing westward to stations at Ellenbrook and Tyldesley. After Tyldesley the line split, the Tyldesley Loopline continued to Kenyon Junction while the Wigan line continued to the north west to Howe Bridge Station before crossing the Bolton and Leigh Railway line. The next station was Hindley Green on the northerly (straight) section and it then passed Platt Bridge and approached a complex junction south of Wigan on what is now the West Coast Main Line.

== Colliery sidings ==
The route also served the collieries in the area. Sidings for Shakerley Collieries (Ramsden's) and the Tyldesley Coal Company (Greens) were located to the east of Tyldesley Station and for Fletcher, Burrows and Company's Chanters Colliery between Tyldesley and Howe Bridge.
