= Bolton and Leigh Railway =

Early British railway (1828–1845)

Overview
- Locale: Lancashire
- Dates of operation: 1828–1845
- Successor: Grand Junction Railway

Technical
- Track gauge: 4 ft 8 1/2 in (1,435 mm) standard gauge
- Length: 7 1/2 miles (12.1 km)

The Bolton and Leigh Railway (B&LR) was the first public railway in Lancashire. It opened for goods on 1 August 1828, and thus preceded the Liverpool and Manchester Railway (L&MR) by two years. Passengers were carried from 1831. The railway operated independently until 1845 when it became part of the Grand Junction Railway.

== Background ==
Bolton was situated on the Manchester, Bolton and Bury Canal and Leigh straddled a major east–west canal route. To the west ran the Leeds and Liverpool Canal, and this was connected to the centre of Leigh by the Bridgewater Canal running east. The canals provided freight routes to both Liverpool and Manchester.

The canals of the time were the major freight routes: they were faster and could transport greater loads than the carriers using the turnpike road system. However, these canal routes were slow; they became congested, and increasingly more expensive as demand from the rapidly expanding businesses in the area increased. The waterways had a virtual monopoly on the transport links which enabled them to charge exorbitant tolls.

As costs rose, business leaders and industrialists began to look for another means of transporting their goods and products. They looked to the railway to break the canals' monopoly. The canal companies recognised this threat to their business early on: for example, the Leeds and Liverpool canal company minutes of 21 September 1822 mention the issue, and the canal businesses started to take steps to protect their interests.

Rail roads, tramroads and railways had been around for some time, mainly used to transport goods, especially coal to the canal network. There was already at least one private railway operating in the area: in 1812 Robert Daglish had constructed a railway to carry coal from Orrell Colliery in Winstanley, near Wigan to the Leeds and Liverpool Canal. This railway used "Blenkinsop and Murrays" patent cog and rack steam locomotives to haul the coal wagons. A little further north, the Lancaster Canal had been built in two sections, joined in 1797 by a 5-mile-long (8.0 km) tramroad.

== Inception ==
Sometime before 1 October 1824 a committee was formed by local businessmen, including William Hulton, Benjamin Hick and Peter Rothwell to promote a railway in the area. The committee is first recorded on that date as requiring its 63 members to pay money into a bank for the "making of a railway or railways or tram road from Bolton to the Leeds and Liverpool canal..."

Several routes were proposed and the committee contacted the pioneering railway engineer George Stephenson for his views on the scheme. Stephenson was familiar with the area as he was in the process of surveying the route of the future Liverpool and Manchester Railway (L&MR). Stephenson's response was to commission another engineer, Hugh Steel, to conduct a survey of the viable routes for the railway. Steel had worked with Stephenson as a surveyor on the L&MR, and he was assisted in the survey by Robert Daglish. The plans for the line reflected contemporary railway engineering practice in the north-east of England, where Stephenson came from, by including inclined planes which would require cable haulage by stationary engines. Steel's proposed line was approved by Stephenson and accepted by the committee.

The committee had decided that if they tried to cross the canal at Leigh, with the ultimate aim of making a connection to the proposed L&MR, they would create so much opposition that their parliamentary bill could fail. (Note: A draft act of Parliament is known as a bill in the UK.) There was little precedent for approving railways; local landowners were reluctant to have railways on or near their property; and the canal companies were very influential. The committee decided to put forward a bill they thought could pass, rather than one with a much higher risk of failing.

Towards the end of 1824 the bill was presented to Parliament together with Steel's survey and an estimated construction cost of £43,143 (equivalent to £4,080,000 in 2025 (Note: UK Consumer Price Index inflation figures from 1209–2024 based on data from "Inflation calculator", Bank of England, London, 18 February 2026)).

Bolton and Leigh Railway Act 1825
- Act of Parliament
- Parliament of the United Kingdom
- Long title: An Act for making and maintaining a Railway or Tram Road from or near the Manchester, Bolton and Bury Canal, in the Parish of Bolton-le-Moors, to or near the Leeds and Liverpool Canal, in the Parish of Leigh, all in the County Palatine of Lancaster.
- Citation: 6 Geo. 4. c. xviii

Dates
- Royal assent: 31 March 1825

Other legislation
- Repealed by: Grand Junction Railway Act 1845

Status: Repealed

The bill had considerable opposition in Parliament, but the Bolton and Leigh Railway Act 1825 (6 Geo. 4. c. xviii) received royal assent on 31 March 1825 after clauses had been inserted refusing permission to cross the canal, (Note: Local and Personal Act, 6 George IV, c. xviii: An Act for making and maintaining a Railway or Tram Road from or near the Manchester, Bolton and Bury Canal, in the Parish of Bolton-le-Moors, to or near the Leeds and Liverpool Canal, in the Parish of Leigh, all in the County Palatine of Lancaster.) effectively making the railway little more than a canal feeder. The committee could take some satisfaction in its caution as the Liverpool and Manchester Bill was lost that same year.

This first act of Parliament authorised the company to raise the sum of £44,000, by the sale of 440 shares in the company, each valued at £100. The railway was to be a single track with two rope-worked inclines using stationary steam engines, to run from Lecturers Closes at Bolton to the Leeds and Liverpool canal at Leigh.

== Construction and opening ==
In 1826 work began on the construction of the railway starting from Bolton levelling the ground for the line up to Chequerbent under the supervision of local engineer, Robert Daglish.

Bolton and Leigh Railway Act 1828
- Act of Parliament
- Parliament of the United Kingdom
- Long title: An Act for amending and enlarging the Powers and Provisions of an Act relating to the Bolton and Leigh Railway.
- Citation: 9 Geo. 4. c. viii

Dates
- Royal assent: 26 March 1828

Other legislation
- Repealed by: Grand Junction Railway Act 1845

Status: Repealed

Text of statute as originally enacted

The B&LR found it needed to revise some of the clauses set out in the original act of Parliament and they prepared a second bill in 1828. The second act, the Bolton and Leigh Railway Act 1828 (9 Geo. 4. c. viii), received assent on 26 March 1828. (Note: Local and Personal Act, 9 George IV, c. viii: An Act for amending and enlarging the Powers and Provisions of an Act relating to the Bolton and Leigh Railway.) This Act enlarged the company's powers, and it authorised the raising of an additional £25,000 to meet the increased costs of construction as well as specifying the track gauge for the railway as being 4 feet 8 inches (1,422 mm) between the inside edges of the rails, as well as 5 feet 1 inch (1,549 mm) between the outside edges. Sometime after this the line became a standard gauge line at 4 feet 8 1/2 inches (1,435 mm).

The acts of Parliament for the B&LR also authorised branch lines at the Bolton end, to the Union Foundry on Deansgate, to William Hulton's coal yard at Great Moor Street and to the Manchester, Bolton and Bury Canal. The branch to the canal was never built and the branches to Great Moor Street and Deansgate opened for freight in 1829.

The first section of track between Derby Street Bolton and William Hulton's collieries at Pendlebury Fold near Chequerbent in Westhoughton was officially opened on 1 August 1828

The official opening of the completed part of the railway (which the Manchester Guardian reported as being from Checkerbent [sic] to the town of Bolton) was witnessed by "an immense concourse of people". They saw a procession of a "new locomotive engine made by Messrs. R. Stephenson and Co. of Newcastle ... to which were attached six waggons (Note: 'waggon' was the word used throughout the article rather than the more usual 'wagon') filled with people, and decorated with numerous flags and streamers; then followed a very elegant and commodious coach, intended at some future period to convey passengers on the railway. This was filled with ladies amongst whom was Mrs. Hulton. Then followed seven other wagons, decorated with flags, and crowded with passengers, including the musicians of the Bolton old band, who occupied the two last waggons, and played a variety of appropriate airs, during the procession".

The procession started at 12.15 pm with the locomotive drawing the thirteen waggons and the coach from Pendlebury Fold, near Hulton Park, to Top o' th' Pike where the stationary engine was situated. There were about 150 people on the train which travelled at about 5 mph (8 km/h). On reaching the stationary engine the waggons were detached and "Mrs. Hulton, after a short address, baptised the engine by the name of the Lancashire Witch". She then presented a garland of flowers to the engineer, who treated it, in the newspapers view, rather unceremoniously by placing it on the furnace-pipe (presumably the chimney) where the flowers soon underwent a lamentable change.

The engine was sent back to one of Mr. Hulton's collieries from whence it returned hauling six waggons containing about two tons of coal which it drew with great ease at about 7 mph (11 km/h). The locomotive was again detached from its train and demonstrated some of its abilities, starting and stopping under control even from speeds estimated up to 14 mph (23 km/h). After the demonstration the coach and waggons were attached to the rope of the stationary engine and proceeded down the inclined plane towards Bolton. The waggons were "occasionally moved with great celerity, and occasionally stopped by means of brakes applied to the wheels, in order to shew the command possessed over them by the engineer, in case of any accident or obstruction". The crowd was so large that several people were thrown onto the railway where they were "placed in the most imminent peril" and one man was reported as nearly falling under the wheels of a waggon before it could be stopped, he was reportedly severely hurt.

At the bottom of the incline it was intended that the waggons should be horse-drawn to the terminus but the crowd man-handled the waggons to their destination. Upon arrival, a considerable number of gentlemen sat down to an excellent dinner at the Commercial Inn, Mr. Hulton in the chair.

The coach used by the ladies during the opening was loaned by the L&MR and another carriage was borrowed from them in December 1829 for 'an experiment in passenger carrying' but passengers weren't regularly carried until 1831.

The line was completed through to the Leeds and Liverpool Canal at Leigh by end of March 1830. By then the construction of the Kenyon and Leigh Junction Railway which provided a connection with the Liverpool and Manchester Railway was already well advanced.

== Description of the route ==
The line was just under 8 miles (13 km) in length, and was originally single track with the exception of about 1/2 mile (0.8 km) towards the north end of the line, there were occasional sidings or passing places.

Whishaw (1842) gives a description of the line, starting from Bolton Great Moor Street the train is worked by horse-power to the bottom of the Daubhill incline. Here a 20 horsepower (14,914 W) stationary steam engine hauled the train up out of Bolton. Trains running down the incline are worked by gravity. The incline rises 118 feet (36 m) in 1 3/8 mi (2.2 km).

At the top of this incline the locomotive is attached and the train works to Leigh. (Note: Whishaw does not mention if the train works down the incline with assistance or by gravity but if the railway goes to the trouble to haul locomotives up the Chequerbent incline it can be deduced that the locomotive works the train down the incline) In the other direction a 50 horsepower (37,285 W) stationary steam engine hauls trains (including their locomotives) up from Bag Lane through Chequerbent towards Bolton. This incline rises 243 feet (74 m) but over a greater distance so the slope is less severe overall.

The rope for the Chequerbent incline is made by Webster of Sunderland and is 6 inches (150 mm) in circumference, it weighs about 5 long tons (5,100 kg) when new and costs £2 10s per hundredweight. This rope when partially worn is transferred to the Daubhill incline.

The width occupied by the railway on a level surface is 6 2/3 yards (6.10 m) and the track is ballasted with small coal.

The OS map of 1849 shows the original B&LR line running to the canal as well as the newer K&LJR line running over the bridge.

Double track was laid in sections with the section from Pennington to Atherton Junctions opening on 31 May 1880, the section through Bag Lane on 4 July 1880 and the final section through to Bolton on 1 February 1885, south of Pennington on the former K&LJR had been doubled when the Tyldesley Loopline opened in 1864.

== Stations ==
The original passenger stations on the line all opened on 11 June 1831 when the line opened for passenger traffic, although "station" meant somewhere people could get on or off the train, the facilities would have been primitive by later standards. At Bolton, for example, the booking office was described as little more than a shed.

The original stations were:

- Bolton, which was renamed Bolton Great Moor Street in October 1849. This station was rebuilt in 1871 after it was virtually demolished when a runaway goods train collided with empty carriages in the station in January 1858. The station was patched up and continued to handle traffic until a larger station opened nearby in 1874. (Note: A temporary station opened at Crook Street from 1 August 1871 to 28 September 1874 while Bolton Great Moor Street was rebuilt. Sources differ on whether Great Moor Street station reopened in September 1874 or April 1875. The original service to Kenyon Junction was provided continuously from 1831 to 1954, but a new, service to Manchester Exchange via Roe Green Junction and Walkden Low Level was introduced by the London and North Western Railway on 1 April 1875, when it ran from Great Moor Street. It is therefore possible that Great Moor Street handled the Kenyon Junction traffic from September 1874 and the Manchester Exchange service was added with the opening of the extra platforms in 1875.)
- Daubhill, which closed on 2 February 1885 when it was replaced by a new station with the same name when the line was realigned.
- Chequerbent, which closed on 2 February 1885 when it was replaced by a new station with the same name when the line was realigned.
- Bag Lane, which was renamed Atherton in 1847 and Atherton Bag Lane on 2 June 1924.
- Leigh, which was renamed Westleigh on 1 August 1876.

New stations opened in 1885 at Daubhill and Chequerbent when the line was realigned to remove the inclines and increase capacity, the track doubling took place during the same period.

The new Daubhill station opened on opened on 2 February 1885 on the new alignment of the railway, it was renamed Rumworth & Daubhill on 28 April 1885.

The new Chequerbent railway station, sometimes known as Chequerbent for Hulton Park, opened on opened on 2 February 1885 on the new alignment of the railway.

The last station to open was Atherleigh which the London, Midland and Scottish Railway opened on 14 October 1935 as there had been new housing development in the area.

== Operations ==
The Bolton and Leigh Railway (B&LR) was the first public railway in Lancashire, being a public railway meant carrying goods either by company wagon or privately owned wagon. The B&LR chose to follow the turnpike and canal tradition where the service was available to anyone who could pay the toll.

Shortly after the line had opened its 'utility' was being reported on favourably, coal was reduced in price in the Bolton area by more than 2s per ton. Business on the line improved when the Kenyon and Leigh Junction Railway (K&LJR) was constructed to link the B&LR from its southern terminus with the Liverpool and Manchester Railway (L&MR) at Kenyon.

When the K&LJR presented its bill to Parliament in 1828, MPs were more amenable towards railway companies and the canal company withdrew its opposition to the railway crossing the canal. In 1829 the K&LJR received royal assent to the Kenyon and Leigh Junction Railway Act 1829 (10 Geo. 4. c. xxxvi) authorising it to build a single-track line from the end of the Bolton and Leigh Railway near Twiss (now Twist) Lane in Westleigh to Kenyon, where a junction would be made with the L&MR which was at an advanced stage of construction. (Note: Local and Personal Act, 10 George IV, c. xxxvi:An Act for making a Railway from the Bolton and Leigh Railway in the Township of West Leigh, to the Liverpool and Manchester Railway in the Township of Kenyon, with a Branch therefrom, in the County of Lancaster)

The 2 1/2-mile (4.0 km) line crossed the Leeds and Liverpool Canal before heading south towards Kenyon. Stations were built at Bradshaw Leach and Kenyon. As soon as it opened on 3 January 1831, goods trains could access 28 1/2 miles (45.9 km) of line between Bolton and Liverpool and a few months later a passenger service to Liverpool started.

Walker (1832) reports that from 1 June 1832 passenger service levels for all days except Sunday were:

- Depart Liverpool at 7.30 am to Bolton
- Depart Liverpool at 11 am to Bolton
- Depart Liverpool at 2.30 pm to Bolton
- Depart Liverpool at 5.15 pm to Bolton

On Sundays there was only one departure at 5.30 pm.

Journeys in the opposite direction were not described by Walker but he does report the fare as being "Inside, 5s; Outside, 3s 6d". (Note: 5s and 3s 6d would be approximately £22 and £15.45 in 2017)

By 1834 the B&LR had leased the running of the railway to John Hargreaves, an established carrier of Bolton. Hargreaves was granted running rights over the K&LJR and the L&MR so that he ran the services between Bolton and Liverpool. Hargreaves also worked goods services to Manchester. He was required to provide his own locomotive power, carriages, and wagons, except a few for ballasting which belong to the company. Hargreaves was an established carrier on roads and canals before the railway was built and the main carrier from north west England into Scotland, the equal of Pickfords who controlled the trade to the south of Manchester. Hargreaves became a pioneer of excursions by rail, running Sunday trips from Bolton to Liverpool as early as 1841. In 1843 he ran excursions to London and two years later to Manchester. The Grand Junction Railway (GJR) terminated the Hargreaves leases on 31 December 1845.

The stationary engines played a prominent role on the line for at least 15 years, an interesting example, amongst the few, of the transitional years embodying both techniques of haulage. It is believed the stationary engines remained in operation until about 1846. Cable haulage was discontinued once locomotive performance had improved sufficiently.

Bolton and Leigh Railway Act 1831
- Act of Parliament
- Parliament of the United Kingdom
- Long title: An Act to amend and enlarge the several Acts relating to the Bolton and Leigh Railway.
- Citation: 1 & 2 Will. 4. c. xi

Dates
- Royal assent: 30 July 1831

Other legislation
- Repealed by: Grand Junction Railway Act 1845

Status: Repealed

Text of statute as originally enacted

The railway obtained two subsequent acts of Parliament, the third act was the Bolton and Leigh Railway Act 1831 (1 & 2 Will. 4. c. xi) to amend and enlarge the existing acts and authorising an additional £16,500 of joint stock capital and the powers to raise an additional £25,000 in loans. (Note: Local and Personal Act, 1 & 2 William IV:An Act to amend and enlarge the several Acts relating to the Bolton and Leigh Railway.)

Bolton and Leigh Railway Act 1836
- Act of Parliament
- Parliament of the United Kingdom
- Long title: An Act to amend and enlarge the several Acts relating to the Bolton and Leigh Railway, and for other Purposes.
- Citation: 6 & 7 Will. 4. c. lii

Dates
- Royal assent: 20 May 1836

Other legislation
- Repealed by: Grand Junction Railway Act 1845

Status: Repealed

Text of statute as originally enacted

The fourth act, the Bolton and Leigh Railway Act 1836 (6 & 7 Will. 4. c. lii) which received royal assent in 1836 was an "Act to amend and enlarge the several Acts" already in force and it gave the company power to borrow an additional £60,000. (Note: Local and Personal Act, 6 & 7 William IV, c. lii:An Act to amend and enlarge the several Acts relating to the Bolton and Leigh Railway, and for other Purposes.) One of the other purposes was the right to lease the K&LJR for up to 25 years, as well as for the purchase of the line for the sum of £44,750.

In 1838 there were 86,320 passengers conveyed on the line, an average of 236.5 per day generating an annual income of £6,831 6s 4d. (Note: approximately £584,600.00 in 2017)

== Locomotives and rolling stock ==
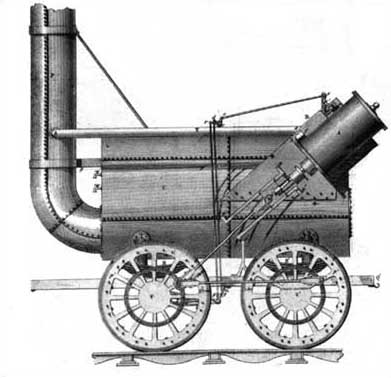
Lancashire Witch

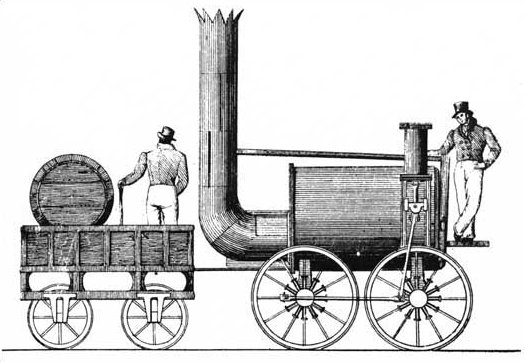
Sans Pareil

Shortly after the passing of the second Act the railway took delivery of their first steam locomotive, which had been ordered from Robert Stephenson and Company by the Liverpool and Manchester Railway in January 1828. The L&MR subsequently decided their order was premature and the locomotive was transferred to the B&LR by mutual agreement. This was the locomotive named Lancashire Witch at the opening of the line.

The Lancashire Witch had some innovative features, it was built with 45° inclined cylinders that allowed the axles to be sprung resulting in improved stability. The locomotive was also equipped with an expansion valve that allowed the control of the flow of steam that entered the cylinders, which made it the first locomotive to feature expansive working.

By 1831, the railway owned at least three other locomotives. Union, which was built in 1830 by Rothwell, Hick and Rothwell, along with Salamander and Veteran, which were both built by Crook and Dean.

In 1832 the railway hired Timothy Hackworth's Sans Pareil at a rate of £15 per month, and then bought it outright for £110. (Note: approximately £1325 and £9714 respectively in 2017)

In 1842 there were 14 locomotives in operation on the line:

- 'Sans Pareil' built by T. Hackworth
- 'Nelson' built by R. Stephenson & Co
- 'Bee' built by Edward Bury
- 'Union' built by Rothwell & Hick
- 'Salamanda' built by W. Dean
- 'Veteran' built by W. Dean
- 'Clarence' built by Edward Bury
- 'Utilis' built by Hargreaves
- 'Victoria' built by Hargreaves
- 'Wellington' built by Tayleur & Co
- 'Marquis' built by Tayleur & Co
- 'Pandora' built by Tayleur & Co
- 'Soho' built by B. Hick & Sons
- 'Castle' built by Hargreaves

Sans Pareil was used on the railway until 1844, when it was sold to the Coppull Colliery, Chorley and used as a stationary engine up until 1863, when it was presented to the Patent Office Museum (now the Science Museum).

The early passenger accommodation on the trains comprised:

- two coaches, named Elephant and Castle, which provided the inside accommodation,
- external accommodation with wooden seats in open wagons.

In 1842 there were five first-class carriages each holding 24 passengers in three compartments. Each carriage was 15 ft 3 in (4.65 m) long with an inside width of 6 ft 6 in (1.98 m). They had spring buffers, were painted green with the company arms on the panels, and had interiors lined with blue cloth. Each carriage weighed about 3 tons and were built by Mr Cooper of Bradshawgate, Bolton, each costing £400. A sixth carriage was slightly different holding twenty passengers, sixteen in two regular compartments and four in a coupe.

There were also eight second-class carriages each holding 24 passengers in three compartments, being enclosed at the ends but open at the sides.

In 1842 there were about 300 wagons in use on the line, all belonging to John Hargreaves. About 40 of these had iron bottoms.

== Later years ==
In 1844, the Liverpool and Manchester Railway had been negotiating with the Bolton and Leigh Railway and the Kenyon and Leigh Junction Railway with a view to an amalgamation, these negotiations were made more complicated by the initial inclusion of the North Union Railway in the proposed merger and then even more complicated when the Grand Junction Railway became interested, all the lines were connected and provided through running for each other's trains. Negotiations were reaching their conclusions when the NUR shareholders rejected their part in the amalgamation. At this juncture the K&LJR simplified the arrangements by agreeing to be purchased outright by the B&LR (under the provisions of the 1836 Act) so the amalgamation took place on 8 August 1845 without the NUR and the B&LR became part of an enlarged Grand Junction Railway. (Note: Local and Personal Act, 8 & 9 Victoria I, c. cxcviii:An Act for consolidating the Bolton and Leigh, the Kenyon and Leigh Junction, the Liverpool and Manchester, and the Grand Junction Railway Companies.)

The GJR became part of the London and North Western Railway (L&NWR) on 16 July 1846 when it was formed by the amalgamation of the GJR, the Manchester and Birmingham Railway, the London and Birmingham Railway and the Trent Valley Railway.

Timetables are available for several of the years the line was open:

- The service level on the line in 1850 when the line was under early L&NWR ownership was 7 trains per day departing in each direction between Bolton Great Moor Street and Kenyon Junction from where there were connections to and from Liverpool, Warrington, Birmingham and London. There were only two services on Sundays. The fare between Bolton and Liverpool was now 5s in first class, 3s 9d in second class and 2s 4d in third. (Note: 5s, 3s 9d and 2s 4d would be approximately £25.41, £19.11 and £11.89 in 2017)
- In 1922, just prior to the grouping of railways, the L&NWR timetable for the line showed 11 services in each direction with some additional part-line services and altered services on Saturdays and no through service on Sundays.
- In 1947, at the end of the London Midland and Scottish Railway days there were 8 services in each direction, with an extra one on Saturdays. There were no Sunday services.

== Closure ==
The stations at Chequerbent and Daubhill closed to passengers on 3 March 1952. All other stations and the line closed to passengers on 29 March 1954 but temporarily reopened in five successive years to cope with Bolton Wakes Week traffic. The line closed in sections, Atherton Junction to Pennington South Junction closed to freight on 7 October 1963, and with it Atherton goods station. Chequerbent goods yard closed on 27 February 1965. With the demise of goods traffic, Crook Street Yard in Bolton closed in April 1965 and private sidings were closed by October 1967. The only coal traffic using the line in the 1960s was from Jackson's sidings in Tyldesley. Passenger traffic from the Tyldesley Loopline closed following the Beeching cuts on 5 May 1969 when all the stations on that line were closed.

== See also ==
- William Bolling
