= Kenyon, Cheshire =

Coordinates: 53.4561°N 2.5590°W

Kenyon
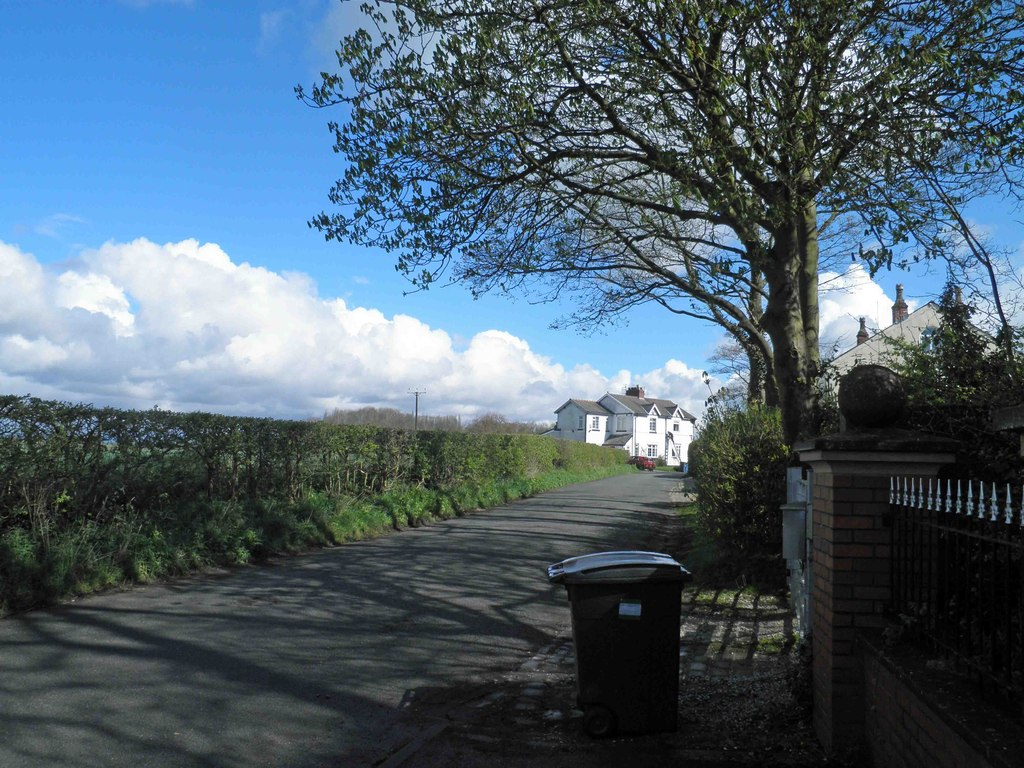
- Main Lane

- Location within Cheshire
- Civil parish: Croft
- Unitary authority: Warrington
- Ceremonial county: Cheshire
- Region: North West
- Country: England
- Sovereign state: United Kingdom
- Post town: Warrington
- Postcode district: WA
- Police: Cheshire
- Fire: Cheshire
- Ambulance: North West
- UK Parliament: Warrington North

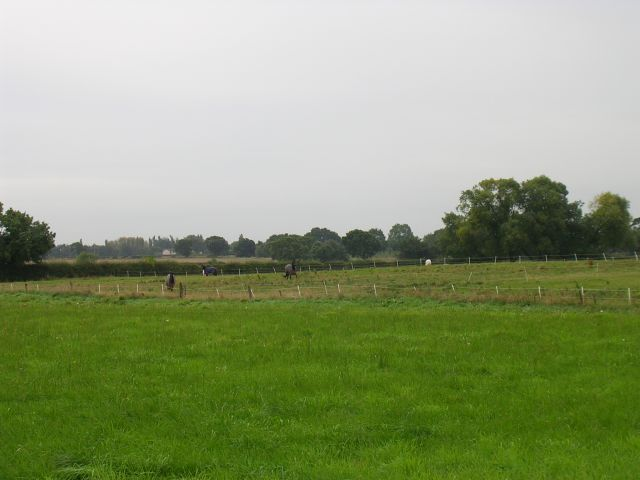
Fields at Kenyon

Kenyon is a village and former civil parish, now in the parish of Croft, in the Warrington district, in the ceremonial county of Cheshire, England. In 1931 the parish had a population of 259.

== History ==
Kenyon was recorded as Kenien in 1212. Kenian in 1258 and Kenyan in 1259. It was sparsely populated, in 1901 the population was 329.

== Governance ==
Kenyon was a township within the historic borders of Lancashire in Winwick ecclesiastical parish and part of Lowton until the reign of Henry III. It became part of Leigh Poor Law Union. In 1866 Kenyon became a separate civil parish, on 1 October 1933 the civil parish was abolished and became part of Golborne parish and Urban District. Golborne Urban District was dissolved in 1974 and its area divided, the Culcheth and Newchurch wards (south of the old Kenyon Junction station and Kenyon Hall) became part of Warrington District in Cheshire, the rest became part of the Metropolitan Borough of Wigan, in Greater Manchester.

== Geography ==
Kenyon covers an area of 1,685 acres (6.82 km^{2}). It is about 2 1/2 miles from Newton in Makerfield (Newton le Willows), 13 miles (21 km) west of Manchester and 4 miles (6.4 km) south of Leigh. The underlying rock is sandstone with clay soil. The road between Culcheth and Lowton crossed the village. To the west of the village the Liverpool and Manchester Railway had a junction with the Bolton and Leigh Railway where Kenyon Junction station was built. The Great Central Railway's Manchester to Wigan line crossed the township. Kenyon was a centre for brickmaking.
