= Worsley railway station =

Former railway station in England

Worsley
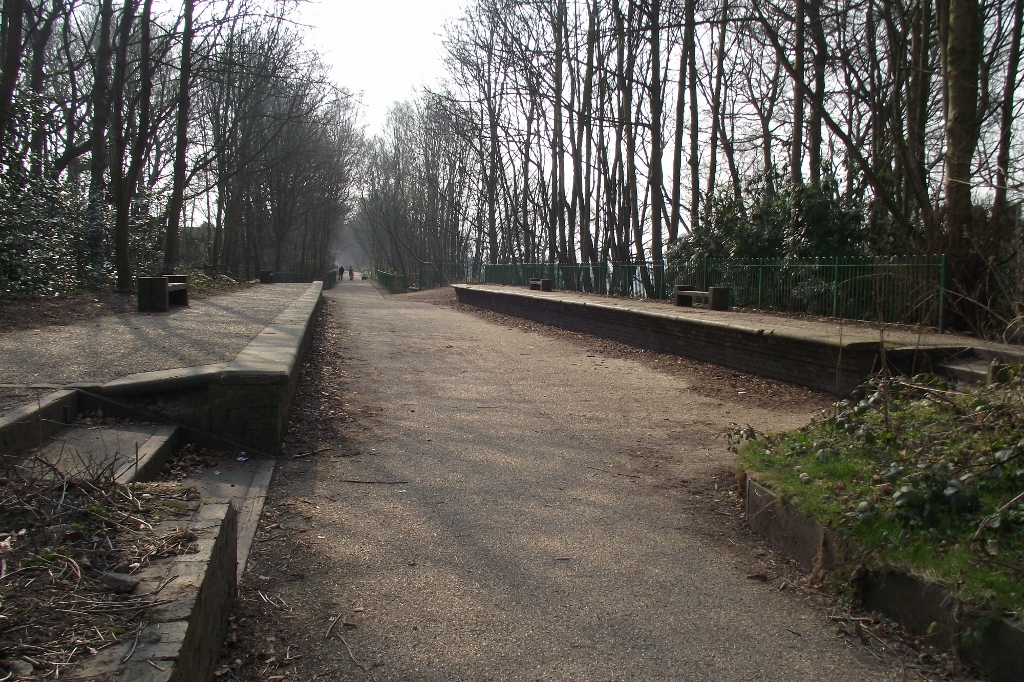
- The site of the station in 2013

General information
- Location: Worsley, Salford; England
- Coordinates: 53.5006°N 2.3663°W
- Grid reference: SD757006
- Platforms: 3

Other information
- Status: Disused

History
- Original company: London and North Western Railway
- Pre-grouping: London and North Western Railway
- Post-grouping: London Midland and Scottish Railway

Key dates
- 1 September 1864: Station opened
- 5 May 1969: Station closed
Location

Worsley railway station was opened in 1864 to serve the town of Worsley in Greater Manchester. The Tyldesley Loopline closed in 1969 as a result of the Beeching Axe.

== History ==
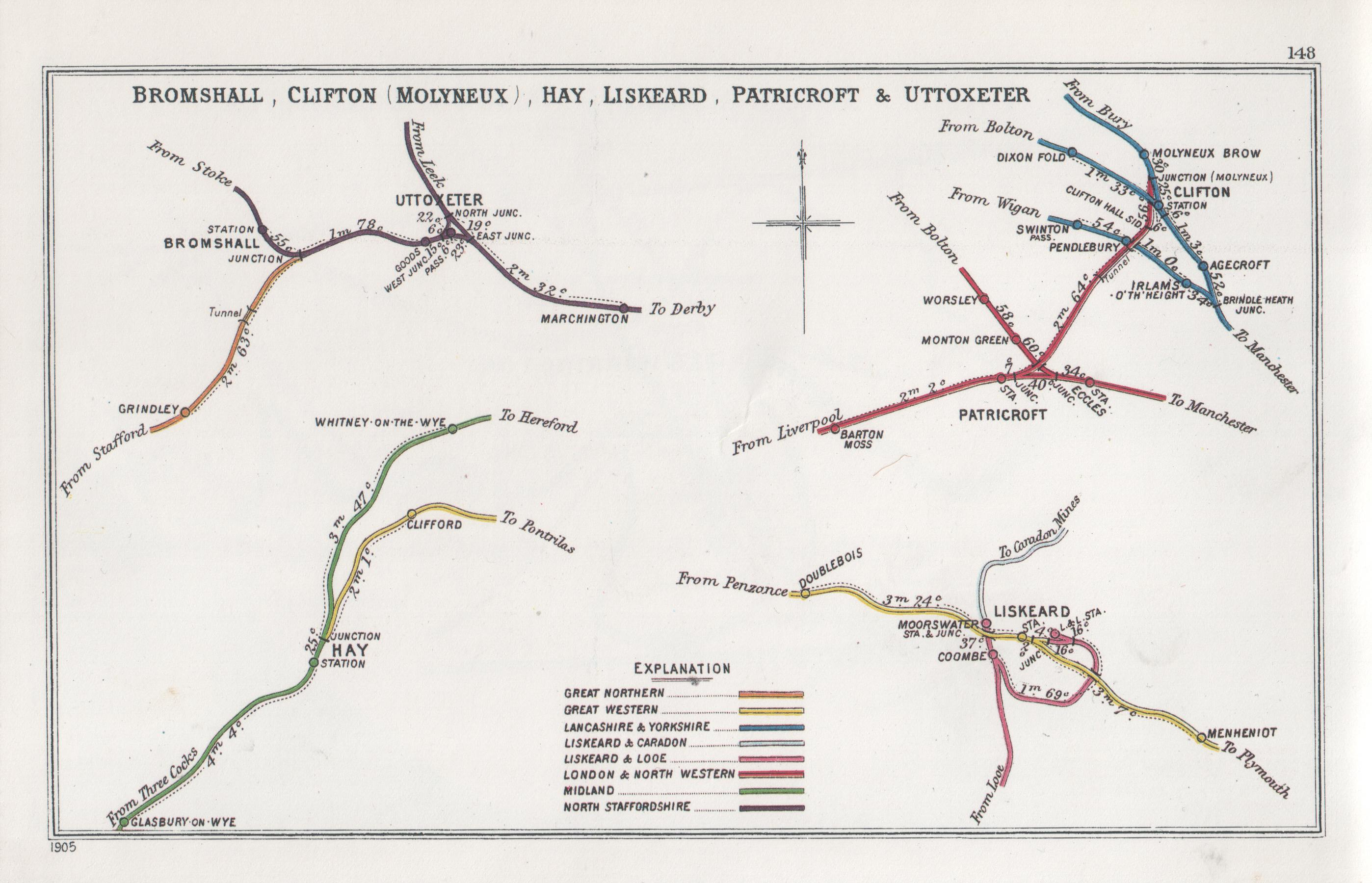
A 1905 Railway Clearing House Junction Diagram showing (upper right) railways in the vicinity of Worsley

Worsley Station opened on 1 September 1864 at the same time as other stations on the Manchester and Wigan Railway line. Local colliery owners including the Earl of Ellesmere were among its supporters. The station was built of white brick with details in red and black brick. The station had two first class and two second class waiting rooms and a booking office. It had a glass canopy and the platforms were 100 yards in length.

The former track bed is now part of a footpath and the station platforms still survive.

Preceding station	Disused railways	Following station
Walkden Low Level; Line and station closed	LNWR	Monton Green; Line and station closed
Ellenbrook; Line and station closed	LNWR	Monton Green; Line and station closed
