= Kenyon Junction railway station =

Disused railway station in England

Kenyon Junction

General information
- Location: Culcheth, Warrington; England
- Coordinates: 53.4637°N 2.5387°W
- Grid reference: SJ642964
- Platforms: 4

Other information
- Status: Disused

History
- Original company: Liverpool and Manchester Railway
- Pre-grouping: London and North Western Railway
- Post-grouping: London, Midland and Scottish Railway

Key dates
- 15 September 1830: Opened as Bolton Junction
- June 1843: Renamed Kenyon Junction
- 2 January 1961: Station closed to passengers
- 1 August 1963: Station closed completely
Location

Kenyon Junction was a railway station at Kenyon near Culcheth in Warrington, England. The station was built at the junction of the Liverpool and Manchester Railway and the Kenyon and Leigh Junction Railway. It was situated in the historic county of Lancashire. The station opened in 1830 as Bolton Junction before being renamed in 1843, and closed to passengers on 2 January 1961, before closing completely on 1 August 1963. The junction fell out of use when the line serving Leigh was closed in 1969.

== History ==
The station was opened on 15 September 1830 as part of the Liverpool and Manchester Railway. It was originally named Bolton Junction before being renamed Kenyon Junction in June 1843.

The early station was criticised for poor facilities and missed connections and was reconstructed in 1883. The London and North Western Railway's Tyldesley Loopline from Eccles to the junction west of Tyldesley station continued south west to Leigh, Pennington and Kenyon Junction opened in 1864.

The original engine shed closed before 1870. Large sidings accommodated goods and coal traffic from Bag Lane, Westleigh, Bickershaw and Abram Collieries and Jacksons and Speakmans Sidings in Bedford, Greater Manchester, Leigh. There were two signal boxes. All stations on the line to Bolton closed in 1954, and Kenyon Junction closed for passenger use on 2 January 1961.

Few traces of the original station remain today.

Preceding station	Disused railways	Following station
Parkside; Line open, station closed	London and North Western Railway	Pennington; Line and station closed
Parkside; Line open, station closed	London and North Western Railway	Glazebury and Bury Lane; Line open, station closed

== Potential reopening ==
In 2001 a proposal to rebuild Kenyon Junction station, which met with much local opposition, was abandoned following the rejection of plans to build a leisure complex in Leigh which the rebuilt station would have served. Locals have lobbied to rebuild the station and build a link to Leigh.

In March 2019, Andy Burnham backed plans to reopen the station as a short-term solution to link Leigh to the rail network. The plans are also backed by the Leigh MP James Grundy, although it is suggested that a reopening of Golbourne station may need to happen first to catalyse the reopening.

== Bibliography ==
- Butt, R. V. J. (October 1995). The Directory of Railway Stations: details every public and private passenger station, halt, platform and stopping place, past and present (1st ed.). Sparkford: Patrick Stephens Ltd. ISBN 978-1-85260-508-7. OCLC 60251199. OL 11956311M.
- Fields, N; Gilbert, A C; Knight, N R (1980), Liverpool to Manchester into the Second Century, Manchester Transport Museum Society, ISBN 978-0-900857-19-5
- Holland, Bert (2001), Plodder Lane for Farnworth, Leigh: Triangle Publishing, ISBN 0-9529333-6-5
- James, David (2004), Lancashire's Lost Railways, Stenlake Publishing, ISBN 978-1-84033-288-9
- Smith, Paul; Turner, Keith (2012), Railway Atlas Then and Now, Ian Allan Publishing, ISBN 978-0-7110-3695-6
- Sweeney, D.J. (1996), A Lancashire Triangle Part One, Triangle Publishing, ISBN 978-0-9529333-0-4
- Sweeney, Dennis (2015), A Lancashire Triangle Revisited, Triangle Publishing, ISBN 978-0-9550030-7-3
