= Irwell Sculpture Trail =

Public art trail in England

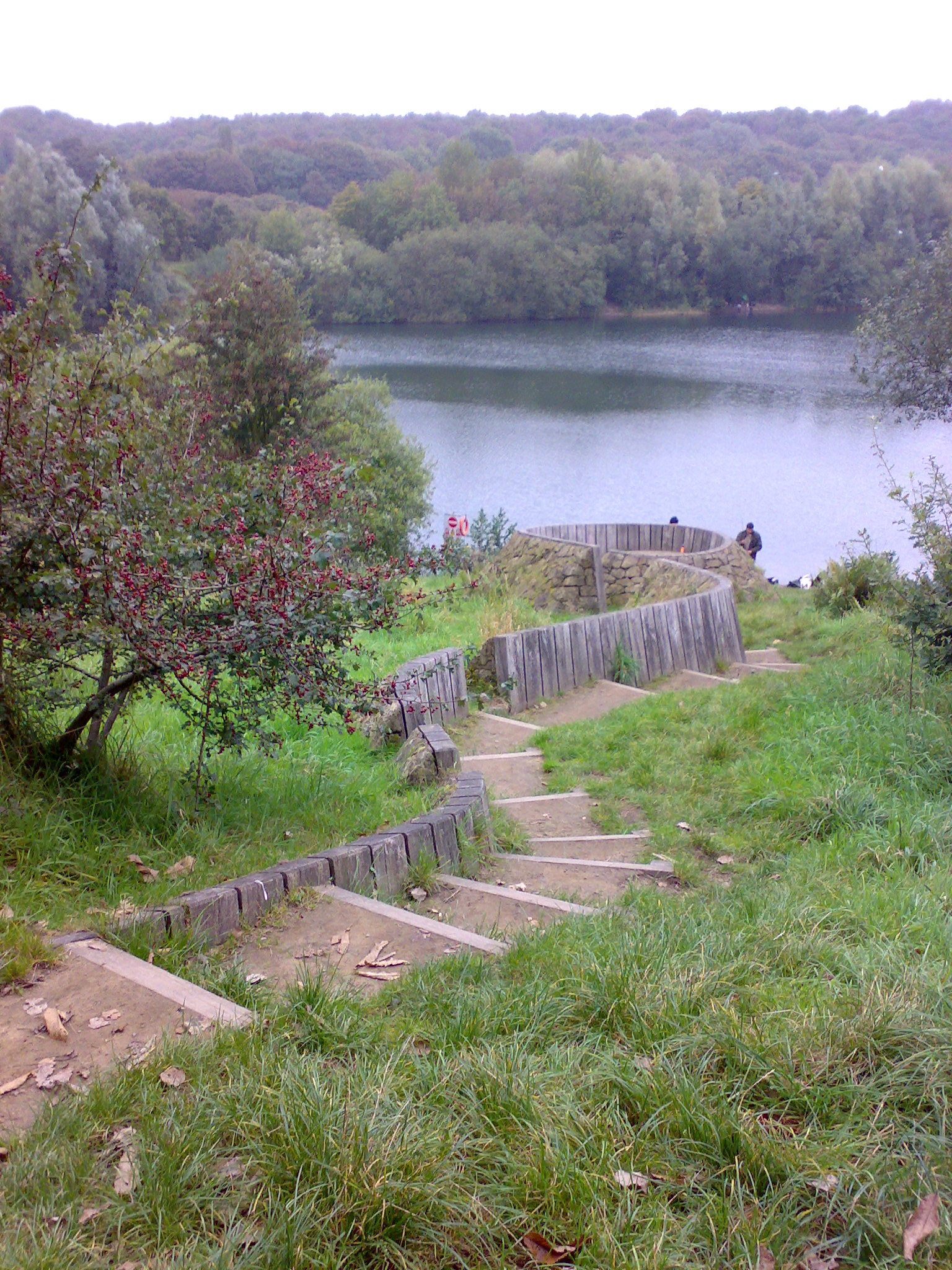
- The Lookout is a sculpture site on the trail
- Length: 30 mi (48 km)
- Location: Northern England
- Trailheads: Salford Quays
- Use: Walking
- Season: All year

The Irwell Sculpture Trail is the largest public art scheme in England, commissioning regional, national and international artists. The Trail includes 28 art pieces and follows a well established 30-mile (48 km) footpath stretching from Salford Quays through Bury into Rossendale and up to the Pennines above Bacup.

== Chapel Street to Peel Park ==
=== The Fabric of Nature ===
Viewed from above this earthwork is loosely in the shape of a bud and leaf unfurling into a double spiral mound taking the viewer up to a curved brick seating area.

A series of leaf images and patterns are set into the brick path to help people discover the park. The sculpture is an attempt to move between the formal Victorian design of the park seen in the remnants of the formal bedding and local buildings, and the geometric patterns of natural forms discovered on closer inspection i.e. the double helix of the centre of a daisy. The design incorporates many requests arising out of a consultation process e.g. seating, colour and improvement of derelict areas.

== Peel Park to Agecroft ==
Arena (completed 2002) is a public sculpture designed by New York artist Rita McBride. It is made of white Ferro cement and stands over 15 feet (4.6 m) high overlooking Littleton Road playing fields and the River Irwell. It is Salford's first major commission for the Irwell Sculpture Trail.

== Clifton to Prestwich ==
Arresting Time: Jill Randall has been a resident artist at Magnesium Elektron Limited just off Lumns Lane for over a year during which time she was influenced by the industrial process she has experienced. Suspended from the riverbank, the alloy sculpture reflects the mechanisms of the factory behind.

== Clifton Country Park ==
See picture at top right of page

The Lookout was built by Tim Norris and Craig Ormerod in 2003, into the bank of the lake (Clifton Marina) at Clifton Country Park, to allow people access to the water and a quiet place to contemplate and rest. 53.53567°N 2.346921°W

== Clifton to Prestwich ==
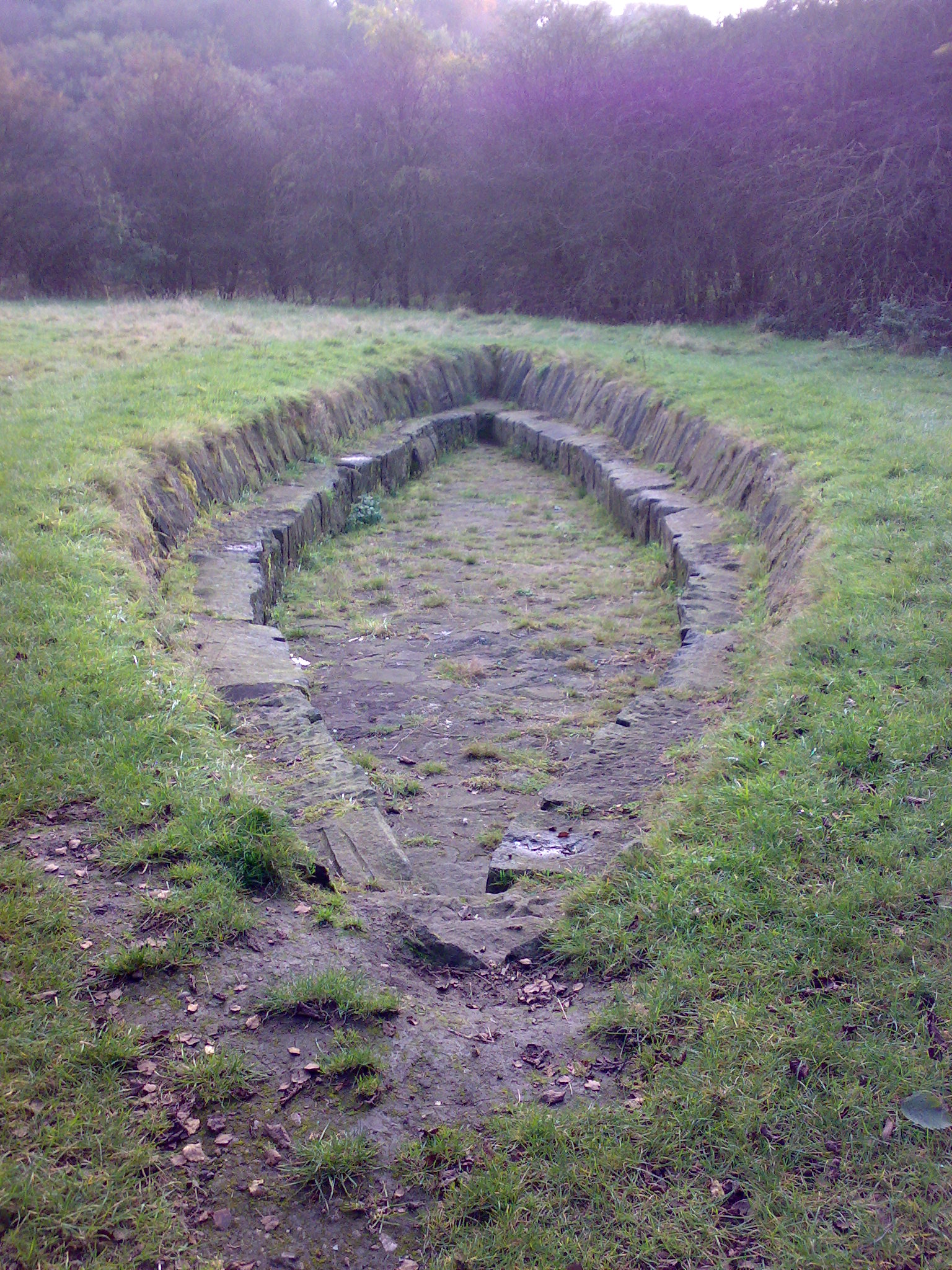
Dig

The Dig was inspired by the local industrial history 'Dig' refers to the starvation boats used to ferry materials from the Wet Earth Colliery at Clifton to Salford Quays, Salford. The boats were called 'starvationers' because of their narrowness, needed to navigate the canals.

Remains of these boats can still be seen in the dried-up Fletcher's Canal in the park. Industrial archaeology, burial ships, underground rivers, crop marks and Iron Age hill forts inform the artist's work. Dig is also used as a seating, eating and performance area. 53.532727°N 2.339024°W

== Radcliffe ==
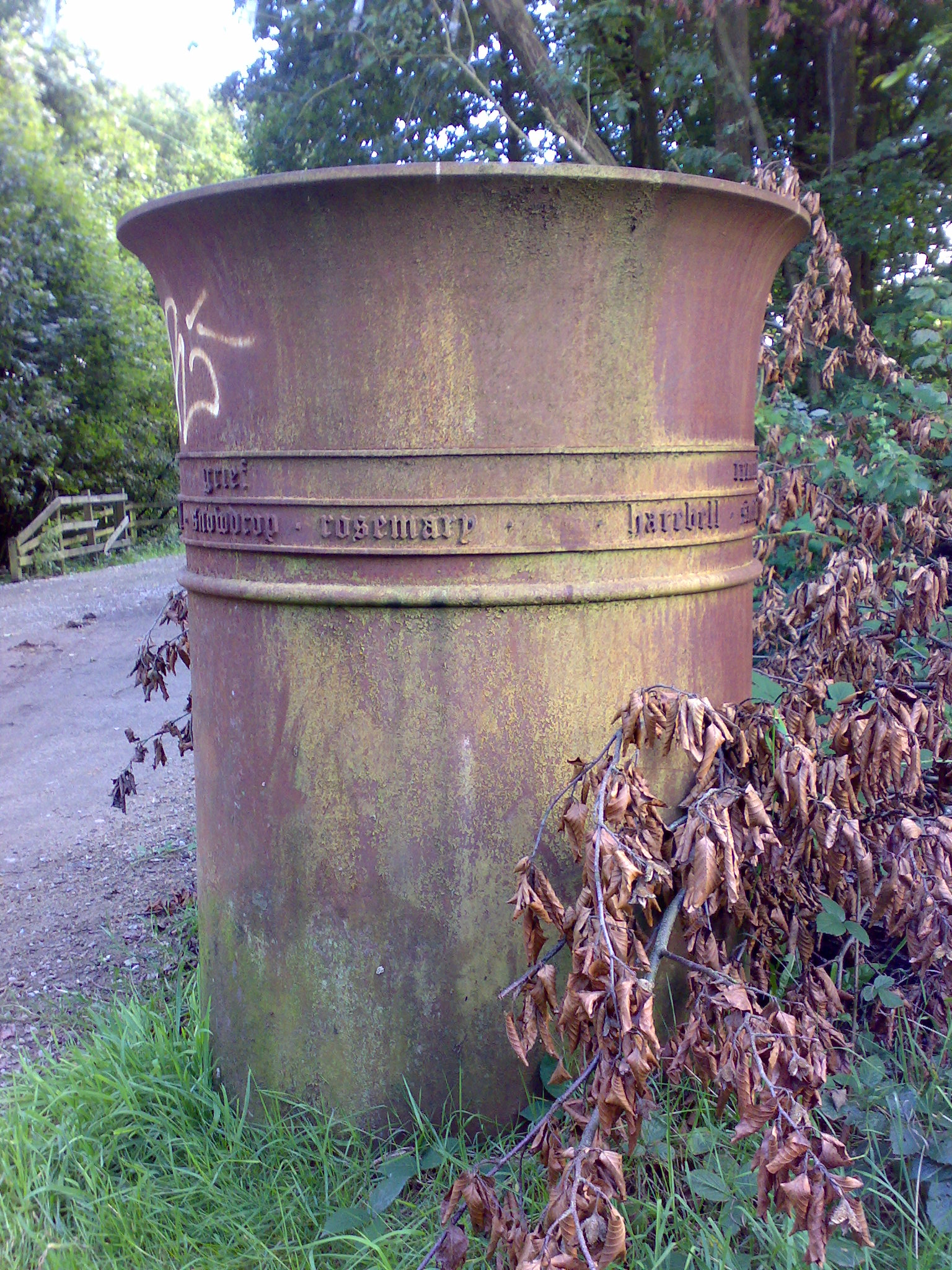
Trinity

The work called Trinity focuses on the period the railway line was constructed, the deaths of many of the 'navvies' involved in the digging of the Outwood cutting and the pre-railway history of the site. The flowers' names hint at the loss of these unknown workers and are a memorial to them and reflect the woodlands that surround the site. Harebell = Grief, Snowdrop = Consolation, Rosemary = Remembrance.

The symbolic language of flowers was in common use during the Victorian period when the cutting was created. The column is also an ancient and symbolic representation of a tree which allows the work to 'merge' into its wooded surroundings. The artist aimed to engage with the wider cyclical events of the site transformations through nature -> industry -> nature over the last century.53.54025°N 2.34038°W

Another sculpture is Our Seats Are Almost Touching. The bench has been produced in a dark grey concrete composite with a smooth, flame finish. The full bench forms a circle but has been split into eight segments of lengths varying from 60 cm to 300 cm and placed as both single and group seating. Each segment enhances a vista or provides a tranquil place for contemplation. This work is part of a series of seating proposals that began in 1994. The Bury benches were the first to be realised with the second series in the Talanue, Waiblingen Germany. This project has established a cultural partnership between the two districts.

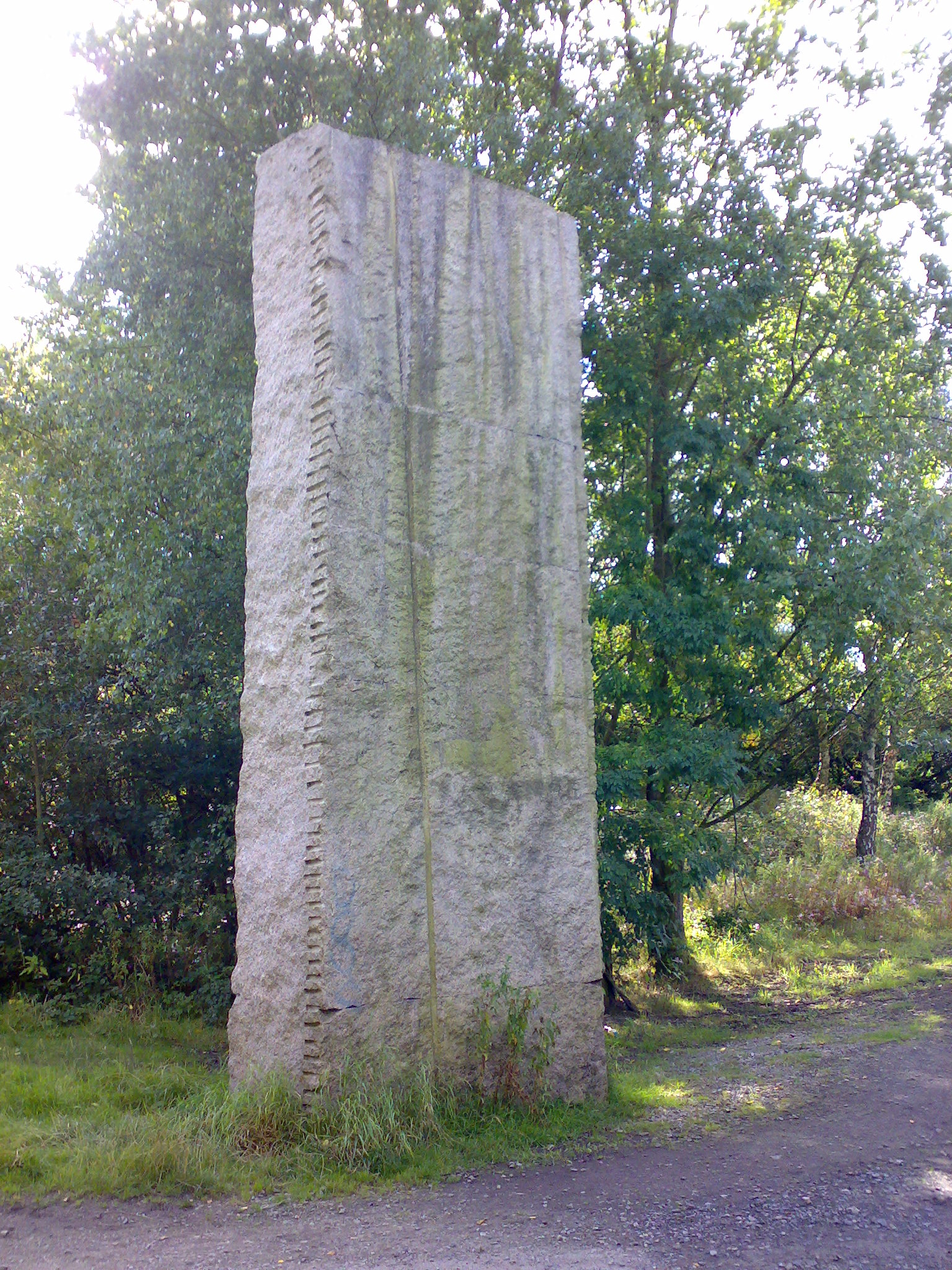
The former railway track

== Ulrich Rückriem ==
On the site of the former Outwood Colliery, Ulrich Rückriem has created one of his largest stone settings to date. It is composed of ten large stone pieces set over a number of locations; one column marks each of the two main entrances, a group of seven tall slabs are installed of a flat plateau, and the largest slab, 25 feet (7.6 m) in height, marks the former railway track. These stones are split horizontally and/or vertically into several parts then reassembled into their original forms. 53.550778°N 2.339731°W

== Nailing Home ==
The starting point for this commission was to incorporate the themes of children's rights and the name of the housing development into the design. Research revealed the mill owner used to keep Shire horses which led to the name Shire Gardens. The final sculpture will mark the entrance to the new housing development. It is the first major public work by Jack Wright, a sculptor who lives in Radcliffe.

The work takes the form of enlarged frost nails, used to attach the Shire horses' hooves in icy conditions. The stem of the nail suggests growth with the head reminiscent of a house roof, this draws a direct parallel to Irwell Valley Housing Association who have developed social housing on this site.

Inscribed on each stem is a line from the poem 'Children Learn What They Live' to remind us how children's lives can be influenced by our actions. This project is a joint commission between the Irwell Sculpture Trail and Irwell Valley Housing Association. 53.564544°N 2.333628°W

In the Bulrushes is another sculpture. It is made of galvanised mild steel and the sculpture is inspired by the nearby Manchester, Bolton and Bury Canal having bulrush motifs, a canal barge hidden in the bottom of the bulrushes and illumination to transform the sculpture at night.

== Bury ==
As If I Were A River has been produced around the key motif of this exhibition - the river. The ethos of this public art commission is to use art as a tool to enable the public to interpret their landscape and have the confidence to explore their environment.

- Water Wheel: The materials are painted steel and stone. This sculpture marks the entrance to Burrs Country Park, once the site of a large cotton mill. The work, half immersed in masonry, at first glance might appear to be an uncovered relic of the huge waterwheels which originally powered the industry of the Irwell Valley. The wheel symbolises the process of constant change, the changing of a river into an industrial site and its change back into countryside again.
- Stone Cycle: Working on site gave the artist an understanding of the place, the passing of time, people, industry the reinventing of the area; this is represented in the broken circular layout of the sculpture. Like the site, the stones had a previous life, originally quarried and cut for use as a bridge. Under the 100 years of industrial grime, the artist discovered marks made by the original masons. Carved symbols were added to these marks, clues to long forgotten stories.
- Picnic Area: This sculpture is a representation of a human scale rat trap rendered in stainless steel with the words picnic area inscribed upon its plate. Sited in the corner of two waterways, a canal and a tributary that once fed the cotton mill, now all that remains of a bygone industrial age.

Fryer's sculpture is a wry comment on this hidden history and the site's current use as a country park. By using the words 'picnic area' the artists is encouraging the visitor to question whether the art work is a public amenity or tourist trap.

== Ramsbottom ==
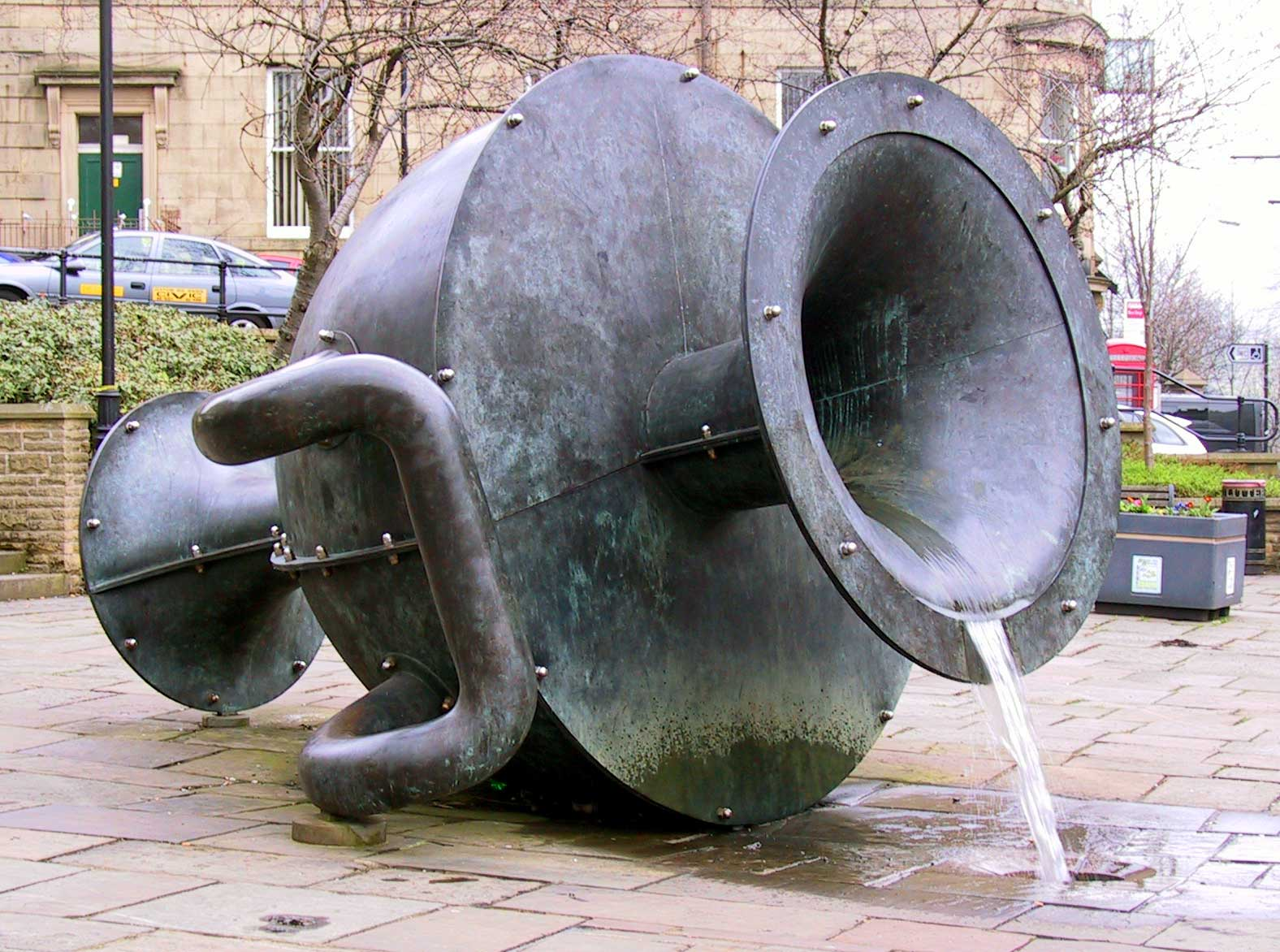
Edward Allington's "Tilted Vase" 1998, Market Place, Ramsbottom

Seek And You Will Find: a series of carved wooden sculptures relating to the indigenous flora found around the park. All the works are 'secretive' located amongst the flora, its form is taken from Ramson herb from which the town's name originates.

- The River: a meandering 90 yards (82 m) path ending in a platform to watch passing trains. The sculpture contains work created by local people - poems celebrating the river and the illustrated story of Jacob's Ladder, a local beauty spot.
- Tilted Vase (1998) by Edward Allington draws on the legacy of the Industrial Revolution in the valley. Classical in shape reflecting the architecture, built in sections and bolted together to look like a machine.

== Irwell Vale ==
- In The Picture (1997) by Richard Caink: The frame refers to traditional landscape painting of the 18th century, often used to display land ownership. The carvings are artefacts that relate to the industry in the valley and the loom-wreckers rebellion of 1826 at Chatterton Mill. The visitor can step into the picture as both viewer and subject matter.
- Remnant Kings: The large timber sections made from local ash timber are cradled in a steel cog. This structure suggests movement, throwing the timber forward and releasing the stones within its folds, like seeds bringing new growth. "Remnant Kings stands proud on the hillside watching over its kingdom waiting for its chance to scatter".

== Rawtenstall ==
- Whispering Wall: Inspired by the water board's installations in the Rossendale Valley, this sculpture brings together elements of local quarrying, redundant pipe work and the ever-present sound of running water. A 4000-litre underground tank acts as a central echo chamber for 37 yards (34 m) of pipe radiating outwards to holes cored in the external, riven, flagstone wall. Drawn by an intense blue light, visible through the holes, the observant passer-by can hear a shifting montage of whispered voices and sound textures sourced from the local ecology.
- Gateway: The materials are steel, mosaic and cobblestone. Railway lines were shaped to form the archway of the gates and steel panels cut with images of steam train wheels to reflect the usage of the immediate area and local history. Funded by Groundwork Rossendale, and English Partnerships in association with the East Lancashire Railway.
- Willow Tree sculpture is a large environmental maze that spreads over a hillside in a series of tunnels. To either side are large turf kilns: a beehive-shaped one from smelting and a ziggurat one for burning charcoal. There are also two detached chimneys for which Rossendale used to be famous. The sculpture has become an open air environmental classroom.
- The Bocholt Tree celebrates Rossendale's award-winning links with its German twin-town. The sculpture is a symbol of unity between the people of Rossendale and Bocholt as a reminder to the people of Rossendale that they have friends in other parts of Europe. Bocholt's civic symbol is the tree. Materials: Painted Metal.

== Waterfoot ==
- Logarythms: A zig zag traveller's rest for walkers of the Way. The sculpture has a simple mathematical construction, increasing in length and height as the piece zigzags down the slope. Materials: Logs

== Bacup ==
- Weave: The starting point for this sculpture was the local industrial heritage and in particular the textile industry. The idea for Weave comes from looking at fabric under a microscope and seeing the threads moving in and out of each other in a woven pattern. Weave also refers to the local landscape with peaks and troughs like the hills and valley.
- Coming Full Circle: The sculpture is a maze enclosure built using dry-stone walling with five spiralling walls and five paths with a quiet, central seat. The pattern of the wall whirlpool mirrors the movement of the wheels turned by water stored in the adjacent lodges which once powered the local felt factory. The five exits continue as paths meandering through a planted belt of hawthorn, cherry and apple whose, when in flower, mass of white blossom will give the appearance of turbulent water around a waterwheel. This sculpture, with an oak tree at its centre, acknowledges the circular motion of time that will return this land back to woodland.

== Deerplay ==
- Sentinel: This sculpture incorporates two traditional skills used in the valley, dry-stone walling and felting, in a unique way. The artist learned stonewalling from a local craftsman and, in turn, passed on the art of felt-making to young people in the valley. Sentinel means soldier posted to keep guard over a special place.

== See also ==
- Environmental sculpture
