= Clifton Country Park =

Nature reserve in Greater Manchester, England

Coordinates: 53.5352°N 2.3455°W

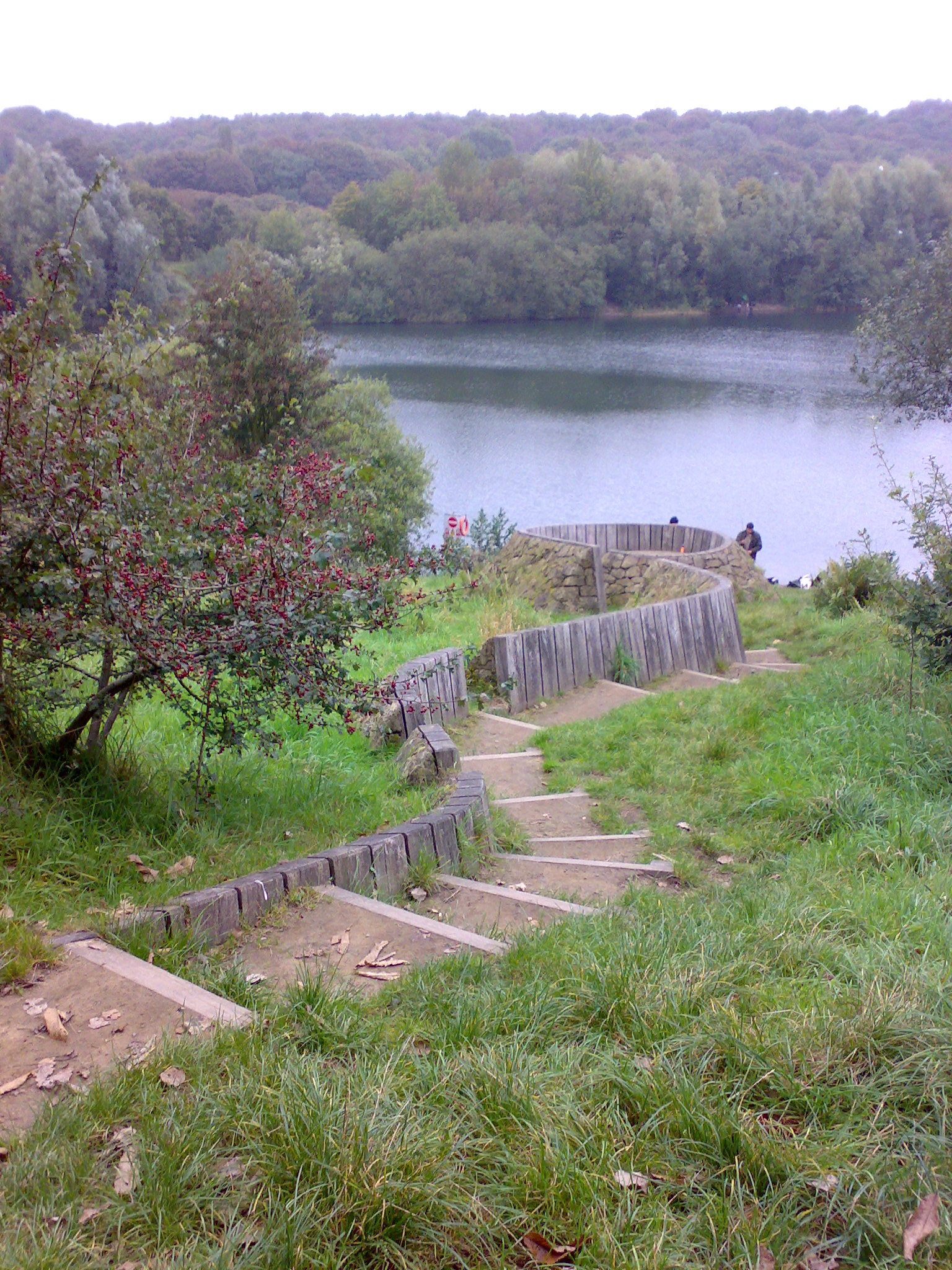
Lookout, a sculpture within the park

Clifton Country Park is a local nature reserve in the Irwell Valley at Clifton, Greater Manchester, England. Situated next to a double bend in the River Irwell, it is north east of the Manchester to Preston railway line and the A666, where it is accessible via Clifton House Road opposite Clifton Cricket Club. Junction 16 of the M60 motorway is only about ¼ mile away to the south east.

The park comprises 119 acres (48 ha) of wooded area, fields and lakes. Industrial heritage is also a feature of the park; the remains of Wet Earth Colliery can be found in the woods, along with Fletcher's Canal. The park also features two sculptures from the Irwell Sculpture Trail. There is a fairytale trail around the lake where wooden carvings are situated, including a full size Gruffalo.

== Importance ==
Clifton House Farm, Clifton Marina and Wet Earth Colliery together form the strategically important site of Clifton Country Park, providing a focal point within the Croal/Irwell Valley and on Salford's Recreation Routes network. An action plan was drawn up to help protect the site and establish several improvements to the area. The action plan also identifies two Sites of Special Scientific Interest (SSSI) for their biological diversity. The marina has also been cited as a place to plant trees and develop a green area along the western edge of the Greater Manchester conurbation.

== Recreation ==
Clifton Marina, a gravel pit developed during the construction in the 1960s of the M62 across the Irwell Valley (now part of the M60), is popular with walkers, joggers and fishermen. There is a surfaced path around the lake providing a circular walk which is fully accessible for disabled users including those in motorised wheelchairs. A visitor centre is fully accessible with both sex toilet facilities. For anglers, the marina is well stocked with carp, bream, roach, tench, pike and perch. In October 2006, this venue produced the Lancashire record carp with a 41 lb 7oz mirror carp caught by Jason Clarke.
