= Matthew Fletcher (mine owner and engineer) =

Matthew Fletcher (1731 or 1733 – 24 August 1808) was a mine owner and mining engineer in Lancashire, England.

== Family ==
Jacob Fletcher lived in Bolton and owned small coal mines in Harwood and Breightmet, Bolton. He had four sons. Matthew was the second eldest. John the eldest, sank a pit in Atherton that led in the 1870s to the formation of Fletcher, Burrows and Company. Jacob became a colliery owner at Darcy Lever and had two sons, Ellis (Matthew Fletcher's heir who died in 1834) and Adam (died 1799). Adam, was a collier at Crompton Fold and had three sons, Matthew (died 1823), Jacob (died circa 1800), and Peter who died in infancy.

== Wet Earth Colliery ==
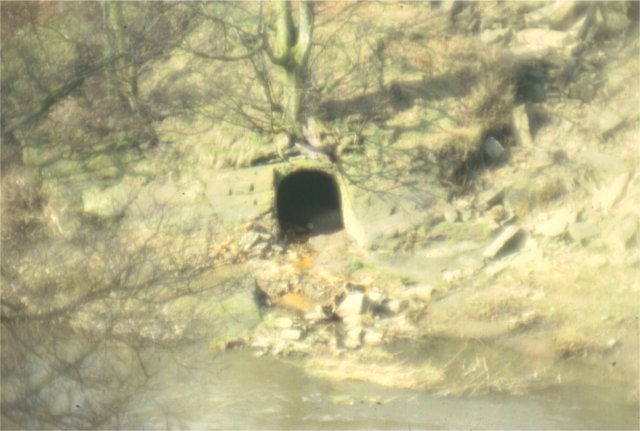
Adit from the Wet Earth Colliery syphon emerging on the bank of the River Irwell

Matthew Fletcher came from a family of mine owners and his first notable work was on the property of another mine owner, John Heathcote. During the 1740s, Heathcote had attempted to sink Wet Earth Colliery, the first deep coal mine in the Irwell Valley at Clifton. The workings were plagued with water from the River Irwell via the Pendleton Fault. Heathcote engaged Fletcher to advise on how to solve the flooding. John Heathcote closed the pit in 1750. Heathcote and Fletcher were at a loss as how to dewater the pit until it came to the attention of Heathcote's relation, James Brindley. He was a canal engineer whose feats included the Bridgewater and Trent and Mersey Canals. He suggested using a Newcomen atmospheric pumping engine but the engine had been plagued with problems. His revised scheme relied on water power but there was no flowing water on the site to power a pump and the pithead was 23 feet (7 m) above the level of the River Irwell.

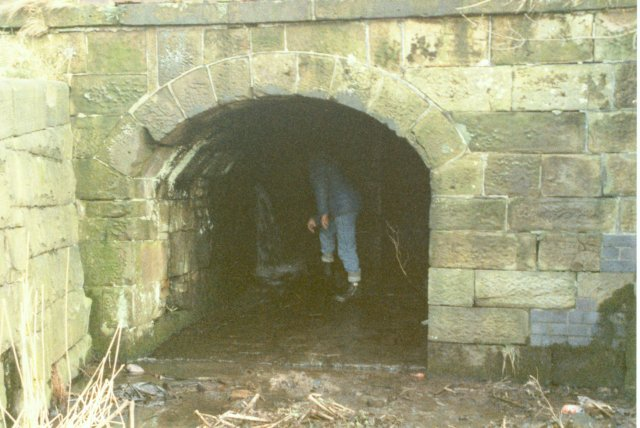
Canal entrance into the Wet Earth Colliery mine

At some point between the 1750 pit closure and the 1756 reopening, John Heathcote signed over ownership of Wet Earth Colliery to Matthew Fletcher. After the reopening, Fletcher sank a new 159-foot (48 m) deep 13-foot (4.0 m) diameter shaft at Wet Earth, known as Gal Pit from the Galloway ponies traditionally used as pit ponies. Gal Pit reached as far as the Doe coal seam.

== Later collieries ==
By 1760, Fletcher had sunk the shaft for Botany Bay Colliery about 1 mile (1.6 km) east of Wet Earth Colliery and extended Brindley's leat to the new colliery (parallel to the Irwell for about 1 mile (1.6 km) and then 380 yards (347 m) south) and installed a second waterwheel to wind coal up the shaft. Fletcher developed several other collieries in the area including Clifton Hall Colliery, off Lumn's Lane, Clifton. Ringley Colliery was on the east bank of the Irwell upstream of Wet Earth near the intake for Bridley's leat. Spindle Point Colliery was at the junction of Manchester Road and Slackey Brow, in Kearsley, about 1 mile (1.6 km) west of Wet Earth and Robin Hood Colliery was midway between the Wet Earth and Botany Bay collieries, but farther from the Irwell.

Fletcher built Clifton House for himself a few yards from the pit. It was demolished in 1965.

== Fletcher's Canal and the Manchester, Bolton and Bury Canal ==
In late 1790, Fletcher widened and deepened the head race between Wet Earth and Botany Bay Collieries into a 1.5-mile (2.4 km) section of canal, which opened in 1791 and became known as Fletcher's Canal. It had no onward connection and for several years can only have been used to carry coal to a wharf for transshipment. In 1796, the Manchester, Bolton and Bury Canal opened between Rhodes Lock (across the Irwell from Wet Earth Colliery) and Salford. The Clifton Aqueduct took the canal across the river downstream of Botany Bay Colliery but disputes over water rights and usage meant it took five years for Fletcher's Canal to be linked. The Manchester, Bolton and Bury Canal relied on agreements with local mill-owners to limit how much water the canal could take from the Irwell. No water from the canal could flow into Fletcher's Canal. Fletcher had built a lock in anticipation of linking to the Manchester, Bolton and Bury Canal but its fall was too great for the water level in the Manchester, Bolton and Bury Canal. The canal company consulted Benjamin Outram who recommended the construction of a second lock in Fletcher's Canal but Fletcher enlarged the lock to create a chamber 90 feet (27.4 m) long by 21 feet (6.4 m) wide that had a fall of 20 inches (51 cm) and could accommodate three narrow boats side by side.

Once the link to the Manchester, Bolton and Bury Canal opened in 1801, Fletcher could send coal Manchester some 6 miles (10 km) away. Following the model of the underground canals that Brindley had developed to extend the Bridgewater Canal into the Worsley coal mines, Fletcher had short underground connecting arms cut at the Wet Earth, Botany Bay and Spindle Point Collieries each terminating at a basin next to the shaft, enabling coal to be loaded directly onto barges at the pit head.

== Later life ==
With the improved access to market that the canal connection brought, Fletcher reinvested in Wet Earth Colliery, buying a steam engine in 1804 and sinking a second shaft in 1805. Fletcher became the chairman of the Mersey and Irwell Navigation and a committeeman of the Manchester, Bolton and Bury Canal Company. Fletcher died on 24 August 1808 and his nephew, Ellis Fletcher inherited the Clifton Estate. On Ellis's death the estate passed to his son Jacob Fletcher Fletcher who died in 1857 and the collieries were then managed by trustees until his daughter Charlotte Anne Fletcher (who was 12 years old when her father died) was old enough to inherit the business.
