= Pilkington (disambiguation) =

Pilkington is a multinational glass manufacturing company headquartered in St Helens, United Kingdom.

Pilkington may also refer to:

- Pilkington (Animal Farm), a human character in George Orwell's satirical book Animal Farm
- Pilkington, Greater Manchester, a former township and parish in Lancashire (now Greater Manchester), England
- Pilkington (surname), an English surname
- Pilkington's Group, a British manufacturer of ceramic tiles
- Pilkington's Lancastrian Pottery & Tiles, a British manufacturer of ceramics
- Pilkington Library, the academic library at Loughborough University, England
- Pilkington of Lancashire, a historic English family
- Pilkington XXX F.C., a football club based in Birmingham, England
