= Clifton and Kersley Coal Company =

English coal mining company

The Clifton and Kersley Coal Company or Clifton and Kearsley Coal Company was a coal mining company that operated in Clifton and Kearsley on the south side of the Irwell Valley, then in the historic county of Lancashire, England. Its collieries exploited the coal mines (seams) of the middle coal measures in the Manchester Coalfield. Pits had been sunk in the 1730s and in the 1740s John Heathcote who owned the pits employed Matthew Fletcher. The Fletchers had extensive interests in coal mining in the area and, by the 1750s, Fletcher owned the collieries.

The Clifton and Kersley Coal Company which took over collieries owned by the Fletchers was started by Edward and Alfred Pilkington in 1867, their younger brother Lawrence later joined as the colliery manager and another brother, Charles, became a director of the company.

The company owned Newtown and Wet Earth Collieries in Clifton, Outwood Colliery in Outwood and the Little Hey, Manor, Scowcrofts and Spindle Point Collieries in Kearsley. They opened Astley Green Colliery in Astley in 1912.

In 1896 the company employed 2,729 workers, 2,146 of them underground while in 1923 it employed 4,300 workers, nearly 2,000 of them at its newest colliery Astley Green. In 1929 the company became part of Manchester Collieries.
