= Dixon Fold railway station =

Railway station in Salford, England

Dixon Fold

General information
- Location: Clifton, Salford; England
- Coordinates: 53.53130°N 2.34286°W
- Grid reference: SD773039
- Platforms: 2

Other information
- Status: Disused

History
- Original company: Manchester, Bolton and Bury Railway
- Pre-grouping: Lancashire and Yorkshire Railway
- Post-grouping: London, Midland and Scottish Railway

Key dates
- 1841: Opened
- 2 August 1926: Closed
- 7 March 1927: Reopened
- 18 May 1931: Closed
Location

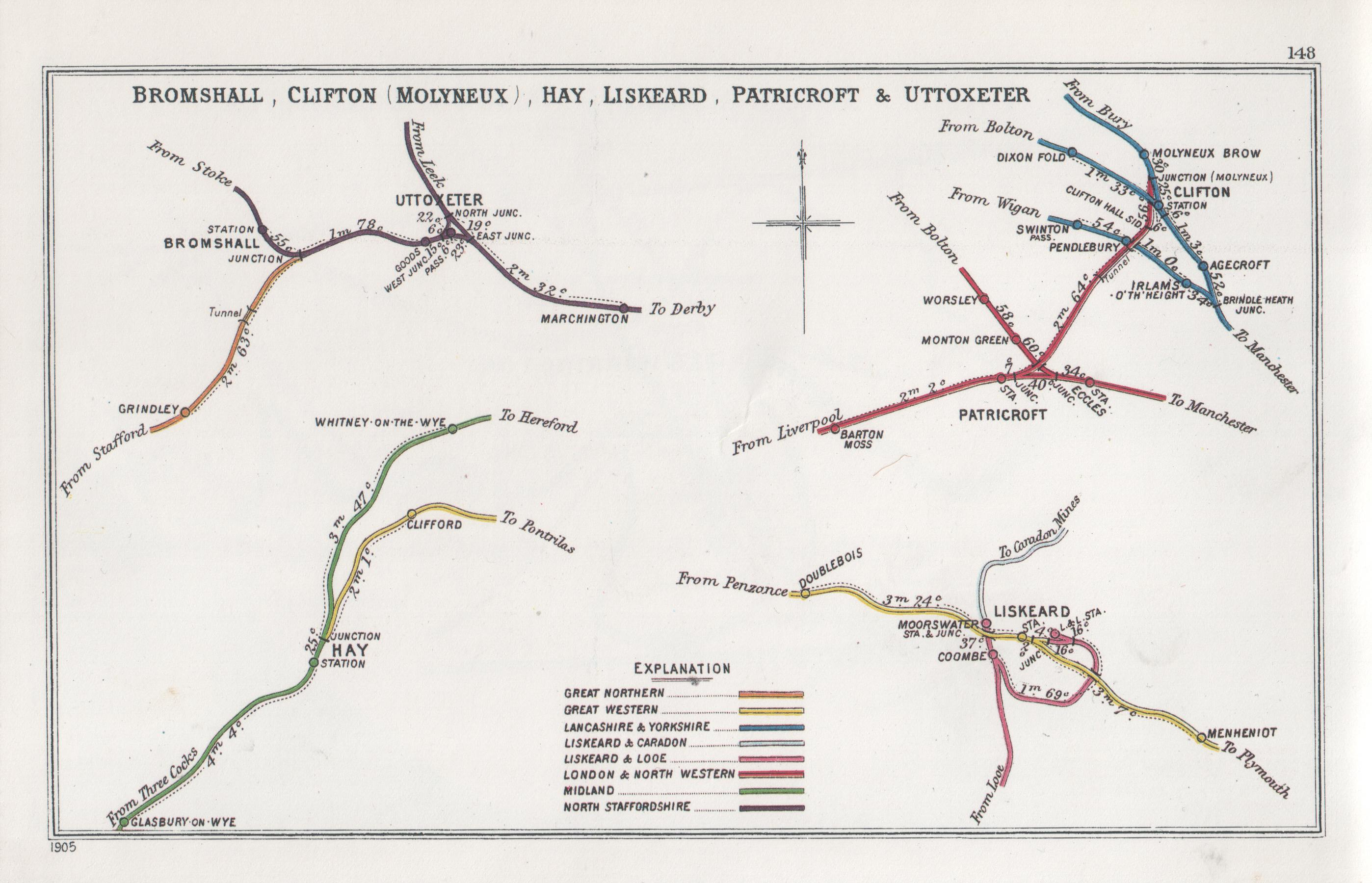
A 1905 Railway Clearing House Junction Diagram showing (upper right) railways in the vicinity of Dixon Fold

Dixon Fold railway station was built on the Manchester and Bolton Railway, between Clifton Junction railway station (Manchester to Preston Line) and Kearsley railway station, in Clifton near Pendlebury. It opened in 1841. Maps of the area from 1848 give it the name Clifton Station, which should not be confused with the nearby Clifton railway station on Rake Lane (formerly named Clifton Junction railway station), which opened in 1847. The station closed between 2 August 1926 and 7 March 1927, but was closed permanently on 18 May 1931. The station was demolished after closure.

== See also ==
- Wet Earth Colliery

Preceding station	Historical railways	Following station
Kearsley	Lancashire and Yorkshire Railway; Manchester and Bolton Railway	Clifton
