= Pilkington's Lancastrian Pottery & Tiles =

English tile, vase and bowl manufacturer

Coordinates: 53°31′34″N 2°19′13″W

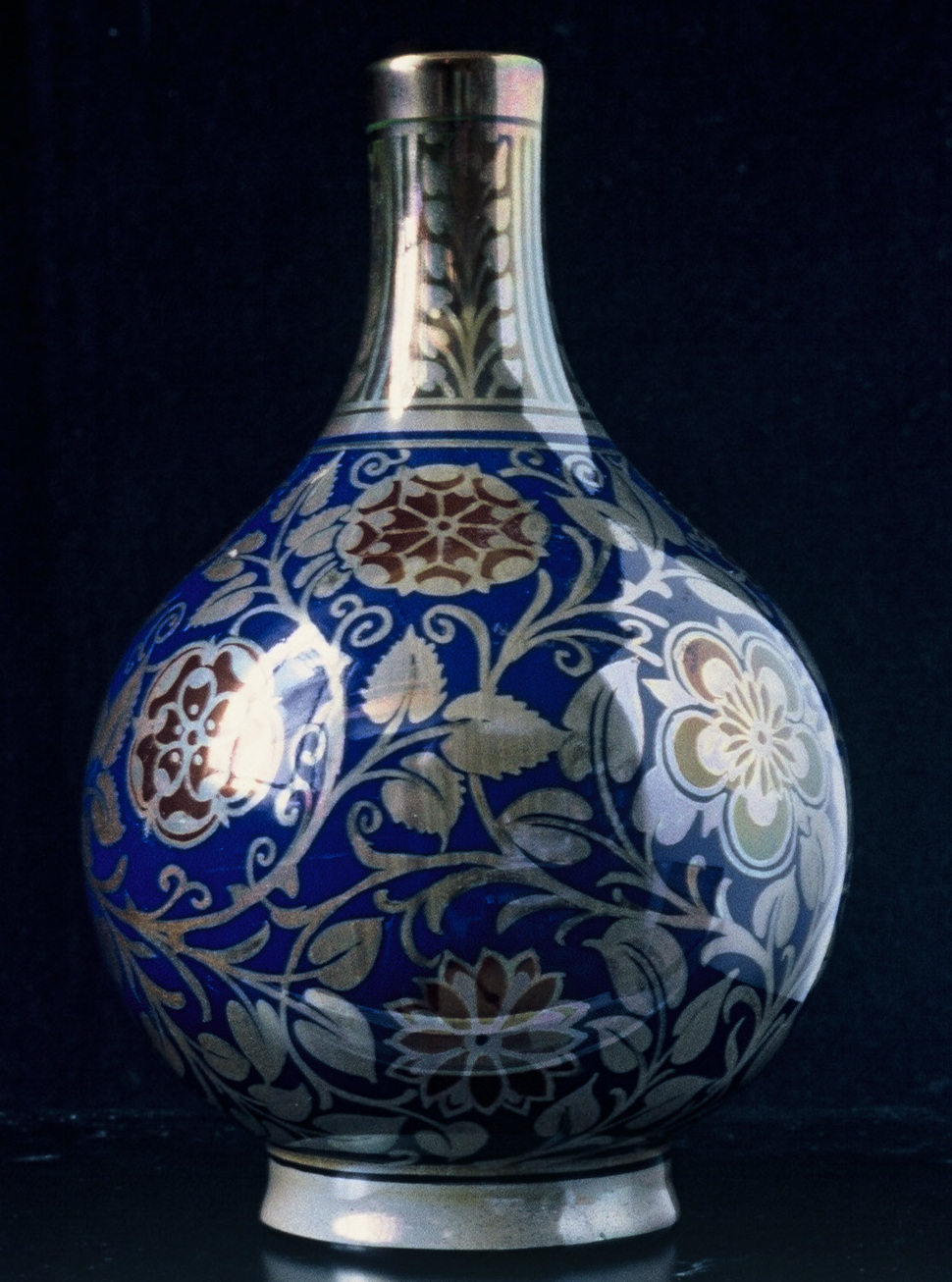
Lustreware vase in "Royal Lancastrian Ware", c. 1923, designed by William S Mycock

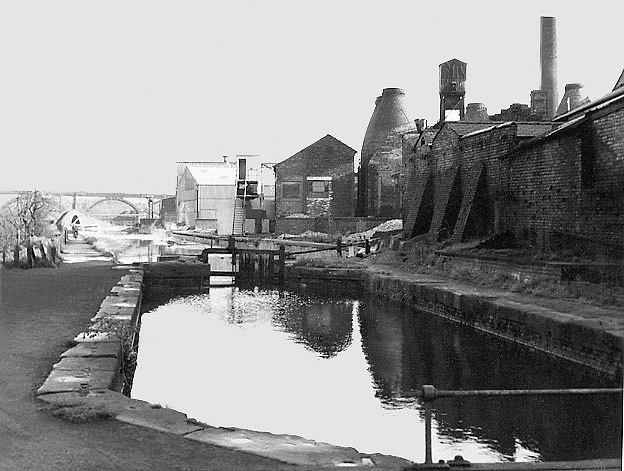
In this early 20th century image, Pilkington's factory and kilns can be seen on the right of the image, with Fletcher's Canal in the foreground.

Pilkington's Lancastrian Pottery & Tiles was a manufacturer of tiles, vases and bowls, based in Clifton near Pendlebury, Lancashire, England. The company was established in 1892 at Clifton Junction, alongside Fletcher's Canal. The company employed talented designers, the most famous of whom was Charles Voysey. Production of art pottery was stopped at the end of the 1930s, although tile production continued. Today the site is occupied by Pilkington's Group Plc.

== History ==
In 1889 the Clifton and Kersley Coal Company sank a pair of pit shafts with the intention of working the coal seams lying adjacent to the geological feature known as the Pendleton Fault. However, the work became increasingly difficult due to the excessive quantity of water that was encountered. When it became clear that the work would not produce coal, the four Pilkington brothers (Edward, Alfred, Charles, and Lawrence), decided to use the marl that had been encountered to make glazed bricks, however, the marl was found to be unsuitable for this purpose.

By chance, the secretary of the coal company knew William Burton, a chemist working for Josiah Wedgwood and Sons. Burton tested the marl and suggested that a more commercial venture would be to make tiles. Decorative tiles were at that time becoming quite fashionable and they were in high demand. The site of the proposed factory had many advantages—it was close to Clifton Junction railway station, it was adjacent to Fletcher's Canal and there was abundant coal nearby in the local Wet Earth Colliery, a short distance away along the same canal. William Burton joined them as Manager, and his brother Joseph as Assistant Manager. Production began in January 1893.

By 1903 the factory had developed an opalescent ceramic glaze called Lancastrian, named after the county of Lancashire where the factory was sited. It became popular in Pilkington's Lancastrian line of pottery. A later glaze took its name from Manchester, the Cunian glaze. Other famous glazes were used, e.g. sunstone, eggshell, fiery crystalline, aventurine, merged and curdled glazes. Glazes of different textures were also produced. These "fruit skin" glazes had surfaces like orange peel or apricot.

The pottery's work was exhibited at the Franco-British Exhibition of 1908 in London.

=== William Burton (1863–1941) ===
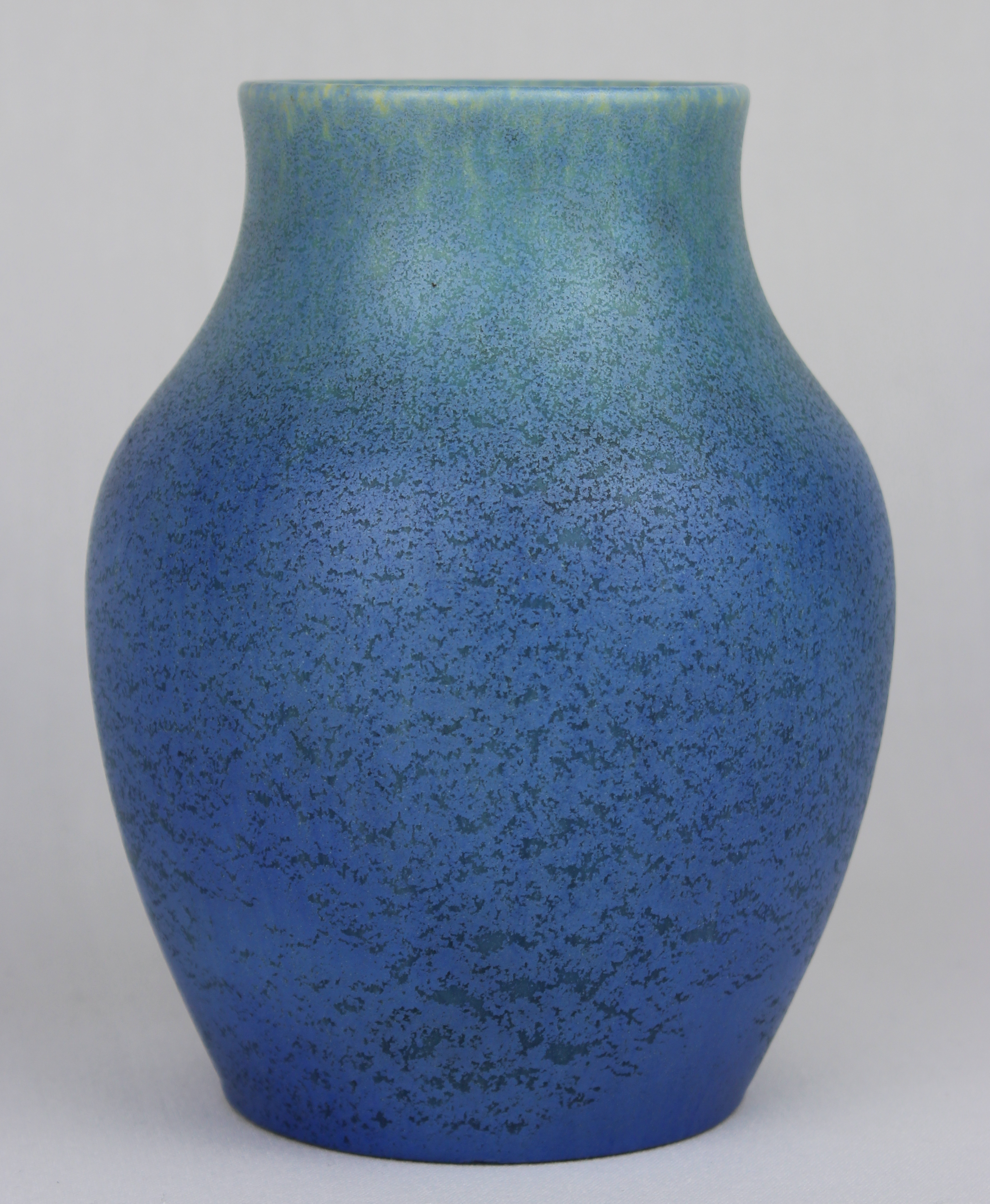
Thrown vase with mottled glaze, Royal Lancastrian, 1938.

William Burton was a chemist with the Wedgwood Company at the Etruria Works in Stoke-on-Trent, with an extensive knowledge of the ceramics industry. It was he who suggested that the red clay and marl found at Clifton was suitable for production of ceramic tiles. Decorative tiling was becoming a popular trend at the time, and represented a long term commercial proposition. Burton oversaw the production of fine pottery in the style of ancient Persian and Chinese potters, employing fine artists and commissioning work from some of the top designers of the time. Burton was a friend of H. G. Wells and was inspired by the Arts & Crafts Movement, and in particular, the workings of William Morris and John Ruskin. He chose artists and designers that shared this inspiration, and Lancastrian Pottery works became high quality examples of the art pottery that was part of the wider Arts & Crafts Movement.

=== John Chambers (1869–1945) ===
Burton invited John Chambers to join him in the running of the Pilkington's Tile & Pottery Company. Chambers was often responsible for designs produced in what became known as the 'Persian style', and was head of the architectural pottery department throughout his time with the company.

=== Royal Lancastrian Glazes ===
High lustre glaze finishes were produced from 1906, and are particularly associated with the designer Gordon Forsyth, who joined the company in the same year. The name 'Lancastrian' was used for the new ware due to the location in the county of Lancashire. Later on, 'Cunian' glazes were named after the site's close proximity to Manchester. Glazes of different textures were used. Some of the more famous glazes used by the Royal Lancastrian Pottery Company included sunstone, eggshell, crystalline and aventurine. One of the most notable, Lancastrian Lustre, was exhibited at the Franco-British Exhibition of 1908.

In 1913 King George V and Queen Mary visited Lord Derby, in whose home several Lancastrian vases were proudly displayed. It was then that permission was granted for the royal warrant to be used and the firm became Pilkington's Royal Lancastrian Pottery Company.

=== After the First World War ===
The First World War was a difficult time for all ceramic companies, and Forsyth, who had left to fight, only returned briefly after the war. Increasingly, the tile side of production dominated. "Lapis Ware", with special underglaze colours, was introduced in 1928. But production of pottery (as opposed to tiles) ceased in 1938. A distinctive type of ware produced in the last years were glazed with a formula including uranium compounds, which gave a bright orange colour, but have the disadvantage of being slightly radioactive; "it has been suggested by experts that one should not store a large number of such pieces in a closed cabinet. Opening the door after a prolonged period could be equivalent to receiving an X-ray".

A pottery studio was opened in 1948, making "attractive decorative wares in the Contemporary style of the 1950s". It closed in 1957, but there was another period in 1972–75.

In 1971 the Tilling Group took the company over; it was in turn bought by British Tyre and Rubber in 1983.
