= Lever Bank Bleach Works =

Works in Greater Manchester, England

Coordinates: 53°33′13″N 2°21′39″W

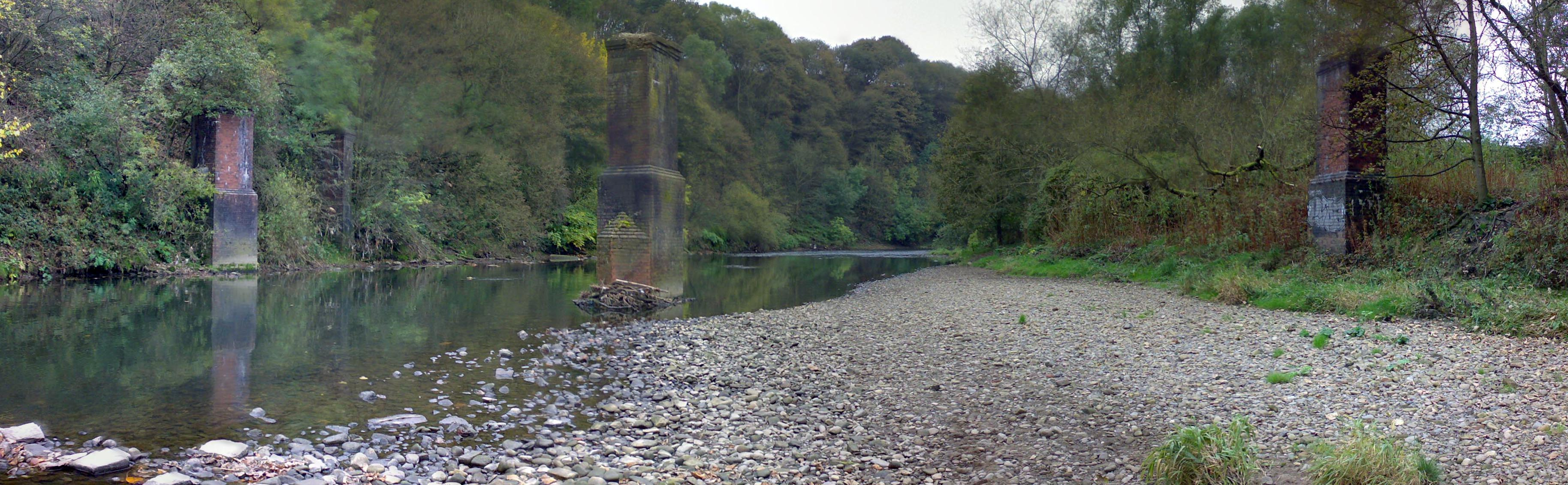
The bridge supports on the river. The bleach works were to the right of this image as it looks west.

Lever Bank Bleach Works was a Bleach Works at Ladyshore, near Little Lever, Bolton. The works was owned by Thomas Ridgway & Sons. Former British Prime Minister Tony Blair would appear to be a direct descendant of this family.

== Location ==
The works was located between the Manchester, Bolton and Bury Canal to the north, and the River Irwell to the south, in the area known as Ladyshore in the Irwell Valley.

Accessed from Ladyshore Bridge, over the canal, the cobbled pathway is still very much evident. Stanchions across the river still stand although the bridge/pipework they supported no longer exists. A weir was built on the nearby River Irwell and water diverted through a small channel into a reservoir. High quality stone walls are still evident along the banks of the river.

The weir collapsed in June 2012.

== Gallery ==
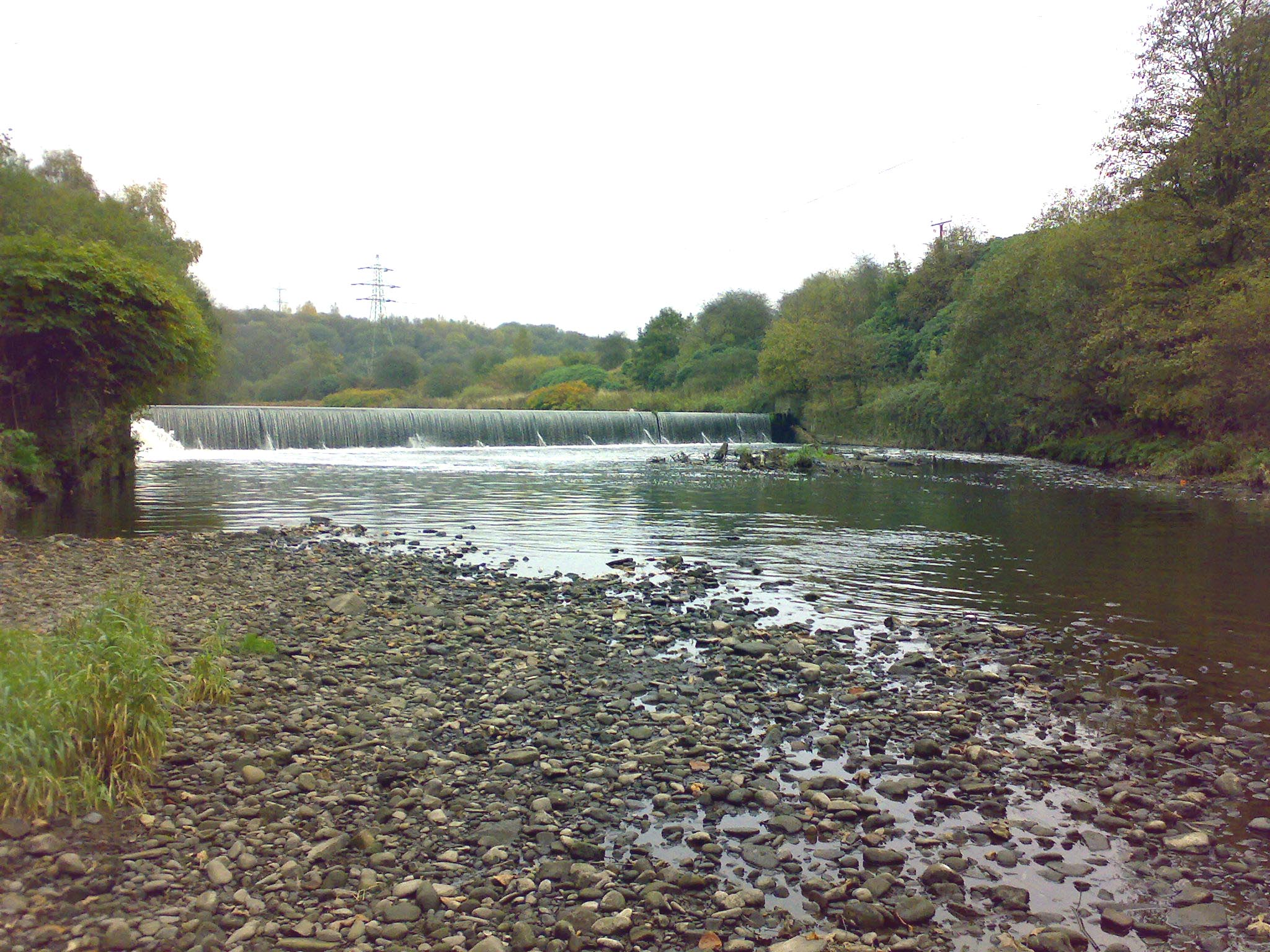
The weir across the River Irwell. Water was diverted to the left of this image.

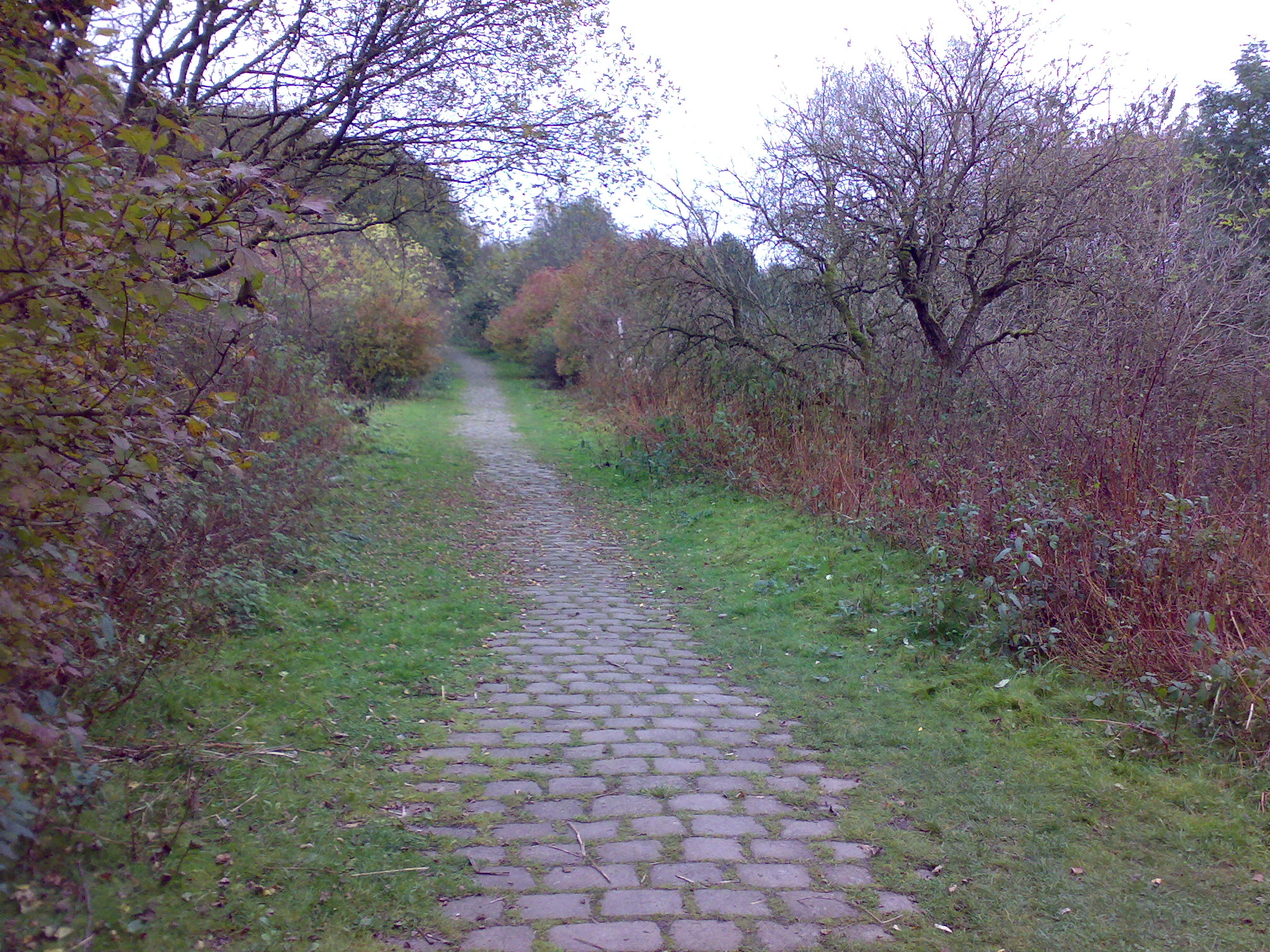
The cobbled access road to the works, still in excellent condition although slightly overgrown.
