= Wet Earth Colliery =

Historical industrial site in England

Coordinates: 53°31′59″N 2°20′32″W

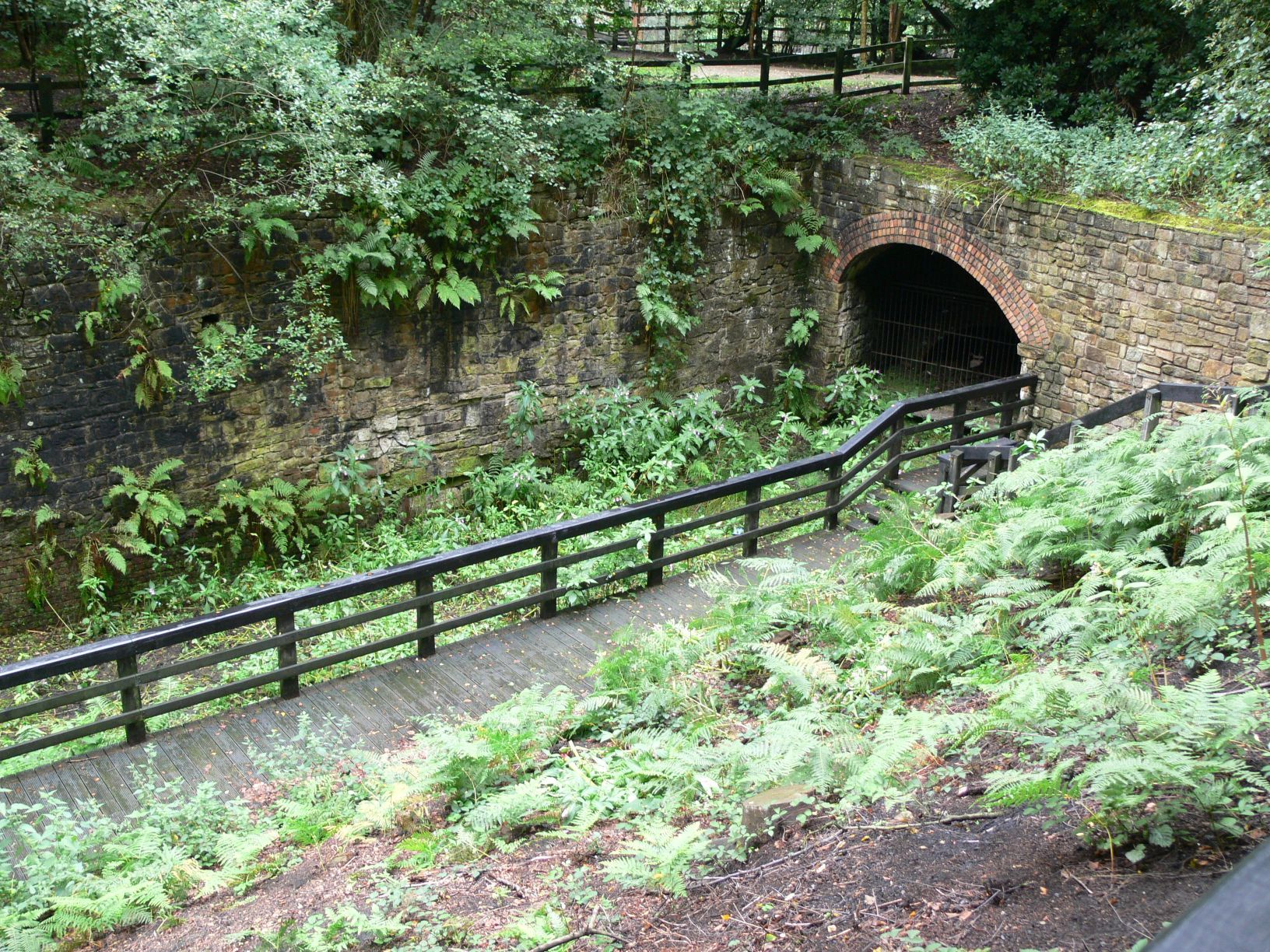
- Canal entrance to the colliery
- Interactive map of Wet Earth Colliery
- Location: Clifton, Greater Manchester, , United Kingdom
- Products: Coal
- Type: Underground
- Opened: 1740s
- Closed: 1928

Wet Earth Colliery was a coal mine located on the Manchester Coalfield, in Clifton, Greater Manchester. The colliery site is now the location of Clifton Country Park. The colliery has a unique place in British coal mining history; apart from being one of the earliest pits in the country, it is the place where engineer James Brindley made water run uphill.

== Geology ==
The colliery is situated in the valley of the River Irwell which flows north to south along the Pendleton Fault. Many other coal mines were situated on this major fault which threw up the underlying Carboniferous coal measures by some 1,100 yards making them accessible for mining from early times. To the east of the fault is the red Triassic sandstone, to the west are the coal measures, which in places outcrop at surface.

== History ==
=== Early mining ===
The area around Nob End in Kearsley, a few hundred yards to the north of the Wet Earth Colliery shows evidence of early bell pit working and small ladder pits. The first deeper working was by the owner of the Clifton Estate, John Heathcote of Glossop in Derbyshire in the 1740s. Heathcote sank two shafts, which were about 50 feet (15 m) deep to the Doe mine. (Note: In this part of Lancashire a coal seam is referred to as a mine and the coal mine as a colliery or pit.) This seam was 9 ft 7½ in thick and dipped at a gradient of 1 in 3½ to the south-west and outcrops in the river valley. Wet Earth Colliery was begun in 1751 when Heathcote sank a deep shaft to the seam about half a mile to the south-east but he ran into technical difficulties and had to call on the help of Matthew Fletcher.

=== 1750–1804 ===
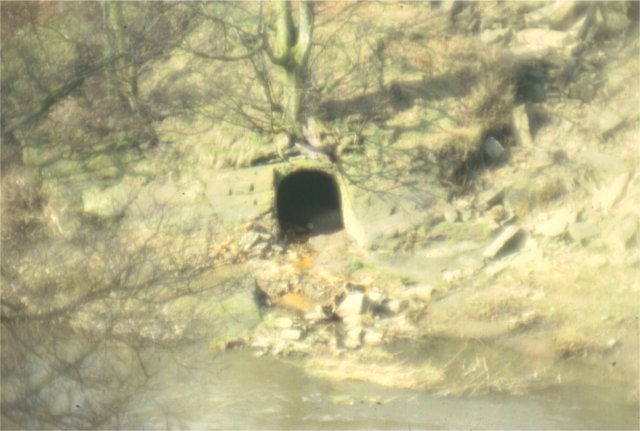
Adit from the syphon on the River Irwell bank

Jacob Fletcher, a mine owner from Bolton, had several mines in Harwood, Breightmet, Bolton and Atherton. He had two sons, John and Matthew. John was responsible for sinking a pit in Atherton whilst Matthew took up mining engineering. John Heathcote was having problems with the pit and called on Matthew Fletcher to help sink a new shaft. The new shaft was sunk 262 feet (80 m) to the seam at a point which became the central focus of the Wet Earth complex. The shaft was deepened to 328 feet (100 m) to connect with the Five Quarters mine which at this point was 3' 7" thick. The workings were plagued with water, which entered from the River Irwell via the Pendleton Fault. Heathcote asked Matthew Fletcher to advise him on how to solve the flooding, but it seems he was unsuccessful. John Heathcote closed the pit in 1750.

Heathcote and Fletcher were at a loss as how to remove the water from the pit until it came to the attention of James Brindley. Brindley, a relative of John Heathcote, was an engineer whose later feats would include the Bridgewater Canal, the Trent and Mersey Canal and the Chester Canal, as well as the Harecastle Tunnel. He initially suggested a scheme whereby a Newcomen atmospheric pumping engine could be used to dewater the mine but the Newcomen engine had been plagued with problems in dewatering deep mines. His revised scheme relied on water power. It had to overcome several obstacles, not least that there was no flowing water on the site to power a pump and that the pithead was 23 feet (7 m) above the level of the River Irwell.

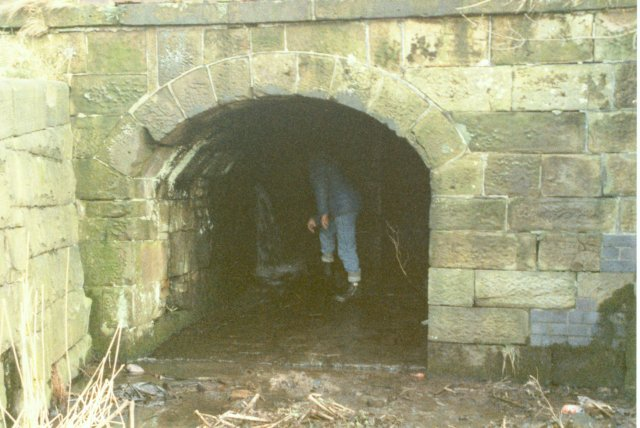
Canal entrance into the Wet Earth Colliery pit

The problem of water level was solved by building a weir upstream on the Irwell as it flowed southeast at Ringley Fold to create a head of water higher than the pithead. Drawing water from the east side of the Irwell, Brindley then drove a tunnel 800 yards (732 m) long through shale and sandstone across a large bend in the river as far as Giant's Seat. By this point the river had crossed the Pendleton Fault, where it curved 180 degrees to flow northwest, and had begun to curve back to resume its southeasterly course past Wet Earth Colliery. At Giant's Seat, Brindley drove two shafts into the sandstone, one each north and south of the river. An adit was also driven from the northern shaft to the river bank allowing the tunnel to be flushed when needed. Brindley connected the shafts with a 73-yard (67 m) tunnel under the river, forming an inverted syphon.

At the top of the southern shaft, an open leat or head race was dug southeast along the west bank of the Irwell. This small feeder canal flowed 235 yards (215 m) until just past the Wet Earth Colliery and then sharply west to enter the mine through a short tunnel.

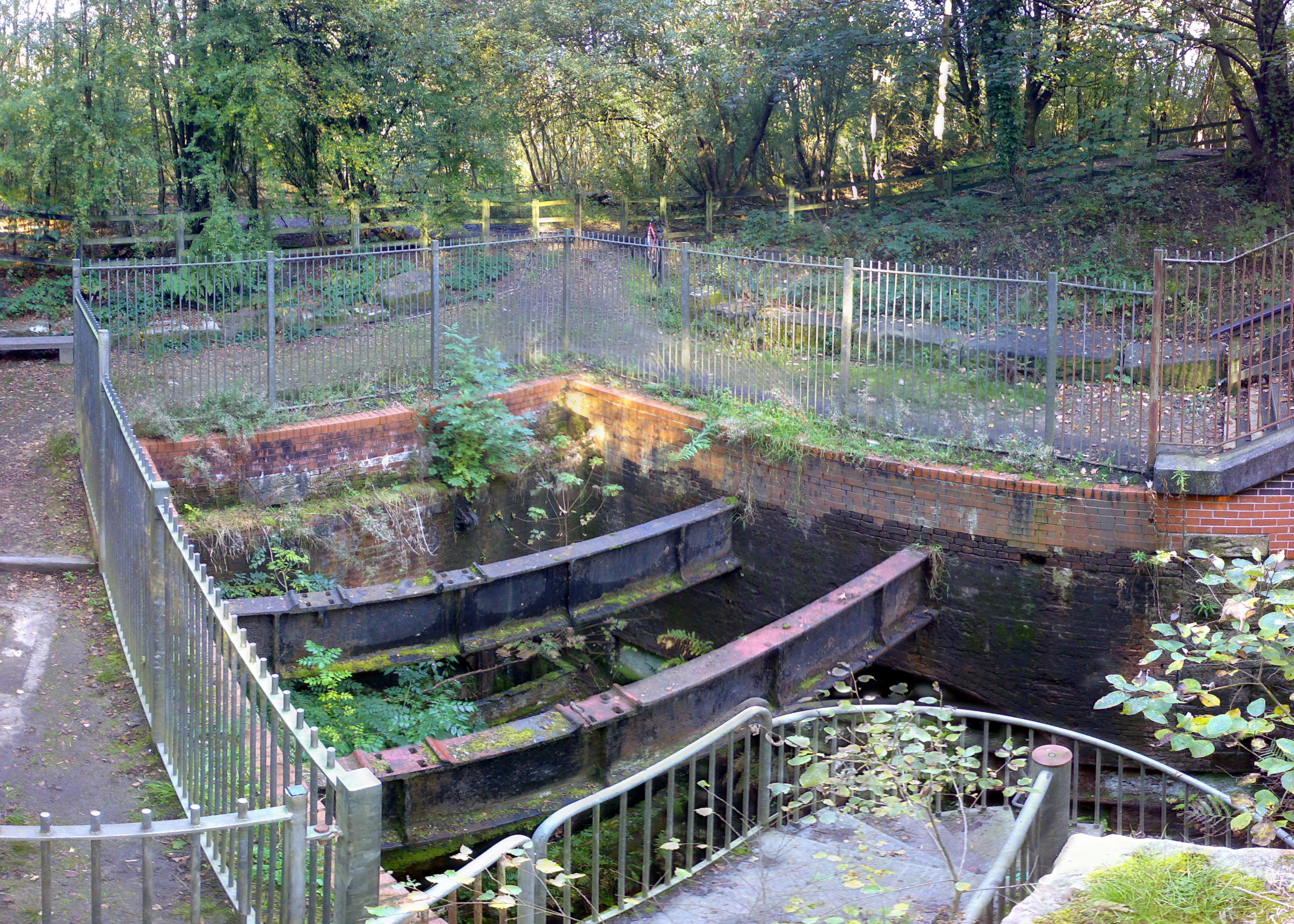
The excavated wheelpit for Brindley's pumping system at Wet Earth Colliery (seen in 2007). It now houses the remains of a turbine.

Entering the pumping chamber next to the pit head, the water turned a 23-foot (7 m) diameter overshot waterwheel that powered a nodding donkey or pumpjack. The water pumped out of the mine then exited along with the tail race through another tunnel back into the Irwell.

Construction started in 1752 and the scheme was completed by 1756. It was so successful that the basic components remained in use for 170 years; the original waterwheel was replaced by a water turbine in 1867.

At some point between the 1750 pit closure and the 1756 reopening, John Heathcote signed over ownership of Wet Earth Colliery to Matthew Fletcher. After the reopening, Fletcher sank a new 159-foot (48 m) deep 13-foot (4.0 m) diameter shaft at Wet Earth, known as Gal Pit from the Galloway ponies traditionally used as pit ponies. Gal Pit reached as far as the Doe coal seam. A memorial tablet was placed on a cottage at the site showing that Fletcher was responsible for sinking the shaft. The tablet has been lost but a photograph of it is stored in Swinton Library.

By late 1790, a surface canal connected Wet Earth Colliery to Botany Bay Colliery. This opened fully in 1791. Fletcher linked this canal to the Manchester, Bolton and Bury Canal enabling him to get coal from mine to the coal wharfs in Manchester some 6 miles (10 km) away. Although started in 1791, the canal was not linked and navigable until 1800. At the same time, a small canal was cut to connect to a basin constructed inside the mine next to the shaft to enable coal to be loaded directly onto barges and then to Manchester. This 1½ mile section of canal became known as Fletcher's Canal.

=== 1804–1880 ===
In January 1804 Matthew Fletcher's nephew, Ellis Fletcher (1765–1834), sank a downcast shaft to the Doe mine and equipped it with a steam-powered winding engine. The original single shaft Gal Pit had given problems with access, ventilation and getting coal out of the mine. The second shaft gave the pit a new lease of life and production increased. The old gin winding mechanism on the Gal Pit was abandoned when the second shaft was opened. On the death of Ellis in 1834, the pit was taken over by his sons Ellis Jnr and John. In 1835, a year after his father John died, Ellis Jnr lost interest, barely keeping the pit going until his own death in 1854. The pit then passed to Charlotte Anne Fletcher. A succession of family, cousins, uncles and sons of these relatives variously owned or worked the mines for the next few years. By 1880, the seams had been almost worked out and the Fletchers lost all interest and sold the mines to the Pilkington brothers, who founded the Pilkington Tile Company on a site close to the Gal Pit.

In 1838 the Manchester and Bolton Railway opened, and Dixon Fold railway station was built just to the south of Wet Earth Colliery.

=== 1880–1928 ===
The Pilkingtons undertook the final phase of expansion at the pit. The surface equipment was replaced and the coal was loaded and shipped without washing to save time and money. Output under the Pilkingtons doubled and the Clifton and Kersley Coal Company was formed. The brothers deepened the shaft sunk by Ellis Fletcher, to reach the Trencherbone mine at a depth of 607 feet (185 m). During this period, further seams were worked including the Cannel, Victoria, Crumbouke and Five Quarters mines. In 1910, a tunnel was driven to connect to the Plodder Mine, which gave the mine a further lease of life until the river found a crack in the fault and flooded it and it was abandoned. Other seams were starting to be work out and, coupled with a miners' strike in 1921, the colliery was run down and closed in 1928.

== Accidents ==
There were at least 38 deaths at the colliery. There were many other injuries and incidents, one being on 17 May 1874. Thomas Entwistle discovered a blockage of air, following which an explosion occurred in which he was badly burnt. William and John Ivill (father and son) came to his aid, but during the descent of the shaft were overcome by blackdamp and fell 300 feet from the cage to their deaths. A serious fire continued for several days.

== Present day ==
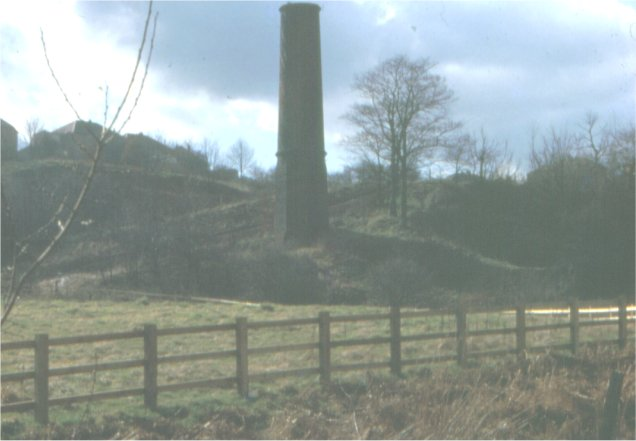
The chimney from the steam engine

The area around Wet Earth Colliery was abandoned, leaving much of the Gal Pit and surrounding buildings intact. Over the years, most of the material has been removed but there remains an area where the original workings can be seen. Salford City Council has designated the area part of the Clifton Country Park and made efforts to restore what is left and laid out a trail to guide visitors along Fletcher's Canal, past the river valley workings connected with Brindley's inverted siphon to the now capped Gal Pit. Wet Earth Colliery Exploration Group has excavated the old penstock and turbine house and some restoration has been completed.
