= Outwood Colliery =

Coordinates: 53.54915°N 2.338961°W

Outwood Colliery was a coal mine in Outwood, near Stoneclough in the historic county of Lancashire, England. Originally named Clough Side Colliery, it opened in the 1840s and was the largest colliery in the area. It was owned by Thomas Fletcher & Sons and then by the Clifton and Kersley Coal Company. There were two pits. Coal was transported by a tramway to a depot west of Outwood Road, in Radcliffe, and also by tramway through Ringley Wood to the nearby Manchester, Bolton and Bury Canal. A railway sidings from the nearby East Lancashire Railway Line was located nearby, from the northern end of the colliery. In its heyday the colliery employed over 2000 workers. Outwood Colliery exploited the coal seams of the Manchester Coalfield and was noted for its Trencherbone Coal.

Due to an underground fire which caused the winding gear to collapse into its own shaft, the colliery was closed in 1931.

== Regeneration ==
The colliery site, which covers 13 hectares (0.050 sq mi), was transferred from the ownership of British Coal Property to Bury Council in October 1997. The council intended to turn the site, consisting mostly of contaminated land covered with collapsed buildings, spoil heaps, and uncapped mineshafts – into open land suitable for public use as part of its Outwood Forest Park project. Converting the site cost about £600,000. The site is now the main entrance to Outwood Forest Park and part of the Irwell Sculpture Trail.
