= Pilkington's Group =

British manufacturer of ceramic tiles

Pilkington's Group Plc was a UK-based manufacturer and supplier of wall and floor coverings and building materials. The group had a history in ceramic tile manufacturing with the head office located on Rake Lane in Clifton Junction, near Manchester, England. The Pilkington's Manufacturing Ltd brand is currently owned by a Polish group of companies Rovese S.A - the second largest tile manufacturer in Europe.

== History ==
Pilkington's Group was established in 1891. In the early 1900s, Pilkington's Lancastrian Pottery & Tiles was formed as a result of an amalgamation of the skills of William Burton and the company's team of artists and designers from Minton Hollins and Wedgwood. In 1913 the company was awarded the Royal Warrant, and Royal Lancastrian Pottery was created. By 1938 the company began to specialise in ceramic wall tiles. The group was previously known as Pilkington's Tiles Group Plc. As of Monday 14 June 2010 Paul Flint and Brian Green of KPMG LLP were appointed joint administrators of the Pilkington's Group Plc, Pilkington's Tiles Ltd and Quiligotti Access Flooring Ltd. The affairs, business and property of the companies are being managed by the joint administrators. The decision to appoint administrators followed an unsuccessful attempt to refinance the Pilkington's Group business.

== Pilkington's Ceramic Tiles ==
Ceramic tiles were first produced by Pilkington's in 1893. The biscuit fired tiles (tiles which have been fired once), were taken for glazing either with a plain glaze or for decorating by the paintresses and fired again. Twice fired tiles were renowned for being superior in quality and this eventually overtook the pottery business to become the company's main production. More recently, in 2004 the company was purchased by a private company that since acquiring the group has brought large investment and phased growth and brand development. Pilkington's still makes ceramic tiles, however the portfolio now includes many other wall and flooring products. Many of the Pilkington's ceramic tile ranges are manufactured at the group's manufacturing facility in Clifton Junction near Manchester.

== Brands & UK manufacturing ==
The Quiligotti brand of marble, terrazzo and natural stone products became part of the group in the 1970s. Quiligotti Terrazzo flooring is installed in a large number of UK supermarkets, shopping centres, railway stations and the London Underground. Quiligotti is also manufactured at the group's manufacturing facility in Clifton Junction, Manchester.

== Closure ==
Pilkington's Tiles Ltd went into administration on 14 June 2010. Pilkington's brand was acquired by a Polish owned group of companies - Rovese S.A. However all of other company's assets were sold to different vendors.
