= Pendleton Fault =

Geological fault in Great Britain

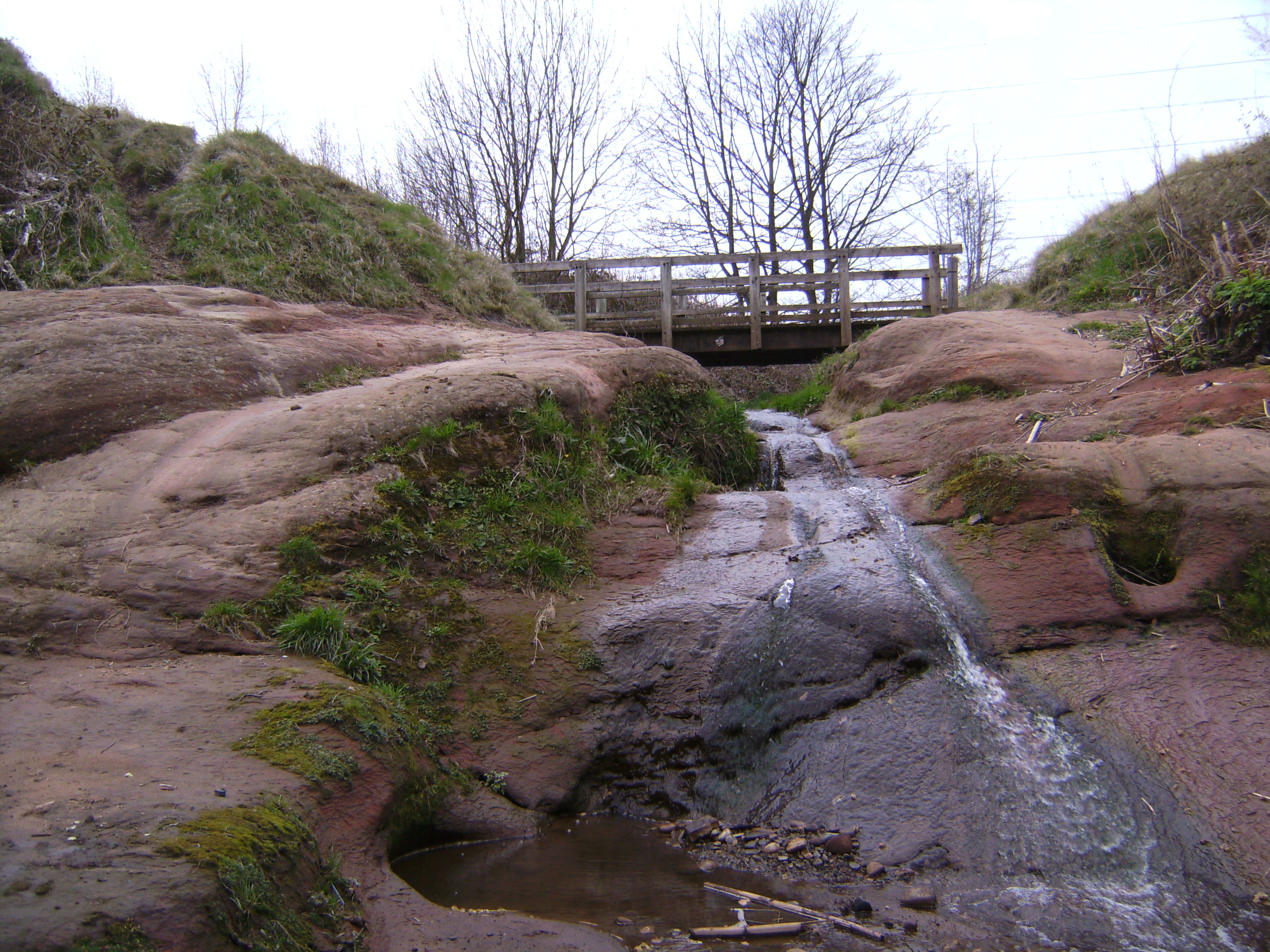
Distinctive New Red Sandstone banks of River Irwell, location of the Pendleton Fault, Clifton

The Pendleton Fault, sometimes called the Irwell Valley Fault, stretches for about 20 miles (32 km) from Bolton in Greater Manchester along the Irwell Valley through Pendleton to Poynton in Cheshire, running northwest–southeast. The fault throws the beds of the Middle Coal Measures of the Manchester Coalfield by 1,000 feet (300 m) on its western side. The fault is active, and movement has caused earthquakes. An earthquake of intensity 6 on the Richter scale that occurred on 10 February 1889 was felt over an area of 2,500 square miles (6,500 km^{2}). Lesser shocks were recorded in the early 20th century, in 1931 and 1944. Coal mining in the Irwell Valley between Bolton and Pendleton may account for small movements, although all mines in the area closed in 1929 and no coal has been mined since.

In 2007 a swarm of six earthquakes felt across the region was attributed to the fault.
