= Clifton Cricket Club =

English cricket club

Clifton Cricket Club
League	Greater Manchester Cricket League.
Ground	Manchester Road (A666), Clifton, Salford, Greater Manchester.
Bolton Assoc. history	1923 - 24; 1937 - 2005
CLL history	2006 - 2015
GMCL history	2016–present

Clifton Cricket Club is an English cricket club based on Manchester Road (A666) in Clifton, Salford.

The club was established in 1874 by the Pilkington brothers who were the village's principle employers via the Clifton and Kearsley Coal Company. The family maintained a connection with the club until the 1960s but, much to the club's regret, gifted the land to the local council instead of entrusting it to the club's trustees. Latterly the club were founder members of the Greater Manchester Cricket League (GMCL) in 2016 and have played constantly in that league's Premier division...

Clifton's current Captain is Sam Dorsey, one of a number of players that came through the club's junior section.
