= Fletcher's Canal =

Canal in Greater Manchester, England

Coordinates: 53.526629°N 2.319864°W

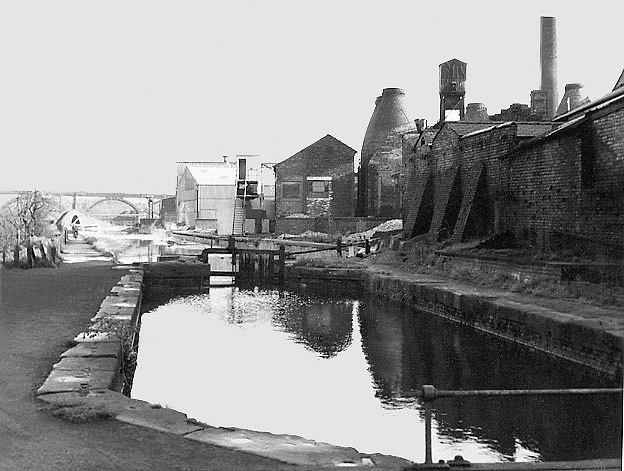
- Fletcher's Canal showing Clifton Viaduct in the distance. Pilkington's factory is on the right.
- Interactive map of Fletcher's Canal

Specifications
- Locks: 1 (originally 1)
- Status: Closed

History
- Principal engineer: Matthew Fletcher
- Date completed: 1800
- Date closed: 1952

Geography
- Branch of: Manchester Bolton & Bury Canal

Fletcher's Canal was a 1.5-mile (2.4 km) long canal in Greater Manchester, which connected the Wet Earth Colliery to the Manchester, Bolton and Bury Canal at Clifton Aqueduct. The canal is now derelict and no longer used.

The canal was built on the south bank of the River Irwell through the area now known as Clifton Country Park. West of Pilkington's long sections of the canal are evident, although none of these sections hold water. As the canal passes through Clifton Country Park a footpath is maintained along the former towpath. Some of the original features are still evident, albeit in extremely poor condition.

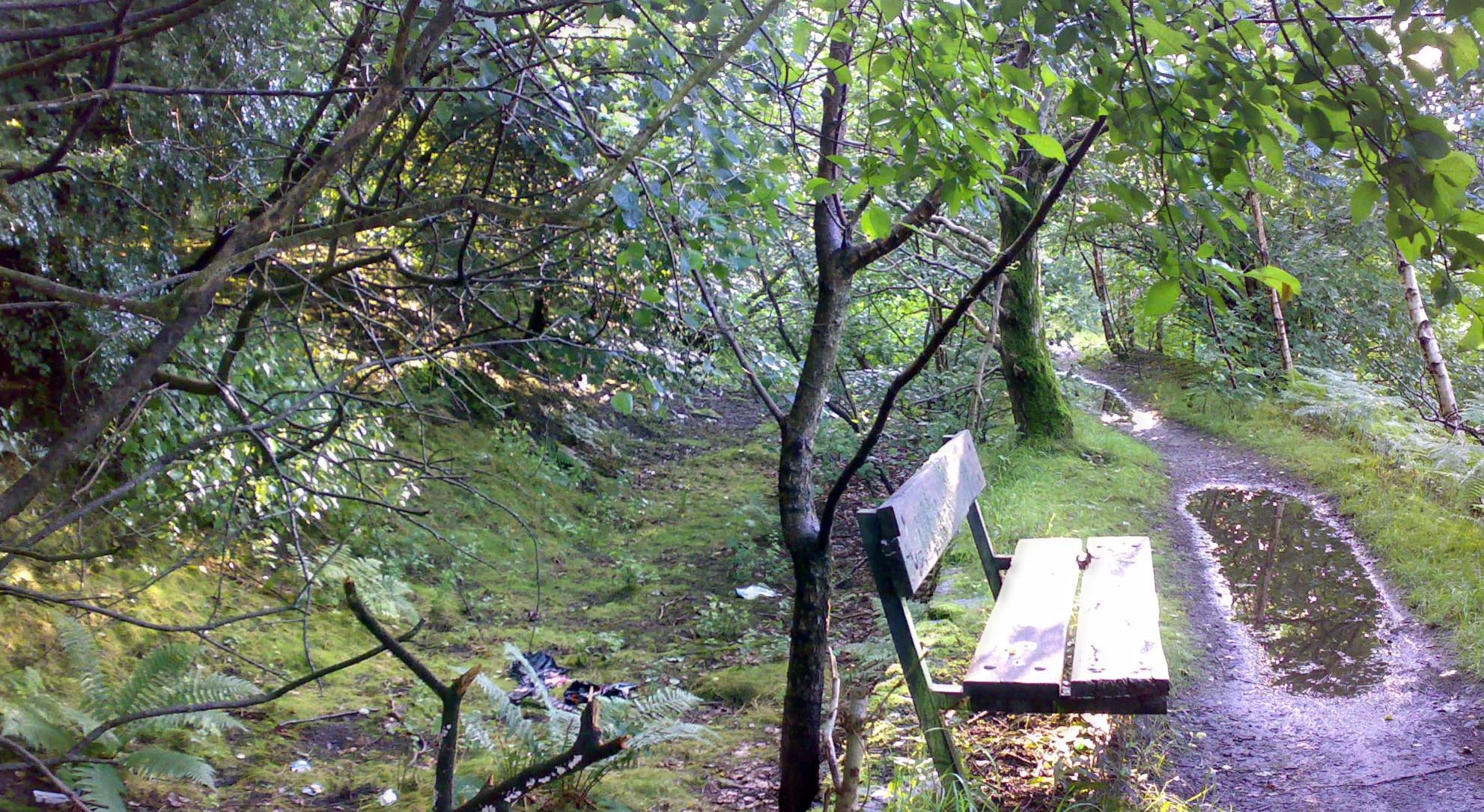
The canal is now completely overgrown and almost lost.

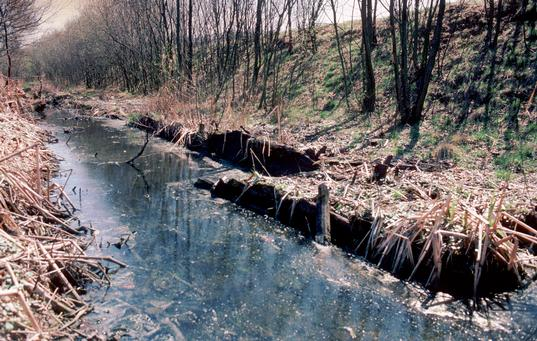
A submerged boat on the canal bed, in 1986

== History ==
Between 1752 and 1756, James Brindley devised a method of pumping water from the nearby Wet Earth Colliery using power harnessed from the River Irwell via a water wheel.

Around 1790-91 Matthew Fletcher began widening some of the original Brindley water channels to create a new canal, latterly known as Fletcher's Canal. In 1799 Benjamin Outram installed a lock along the canal, to avoid taking too much water. The canal construction was completed and navigable by 1800.

In 1867 the original Brindley water wheel was decommissioned and replaced with a water turbine. This was replaced by a steam pump in 1924. Wet Earth Colliery was closed in 1928, and in 1952 the canal was closed and abandoned.

== See also ==
- Canals of Great Britain
- History of the British canal system
- Wet Earth Colliery
- Pilkington Lancastrian Pottery
