= Irwell Valley =

Valley in England

Coordinates: 53°40′N 2°19′W

The Irwell Valley in North West England extends from the Forest of Rossendale through the cities of Salford and Manchester. The River Irwell runs through the valley, along with the River Croal.

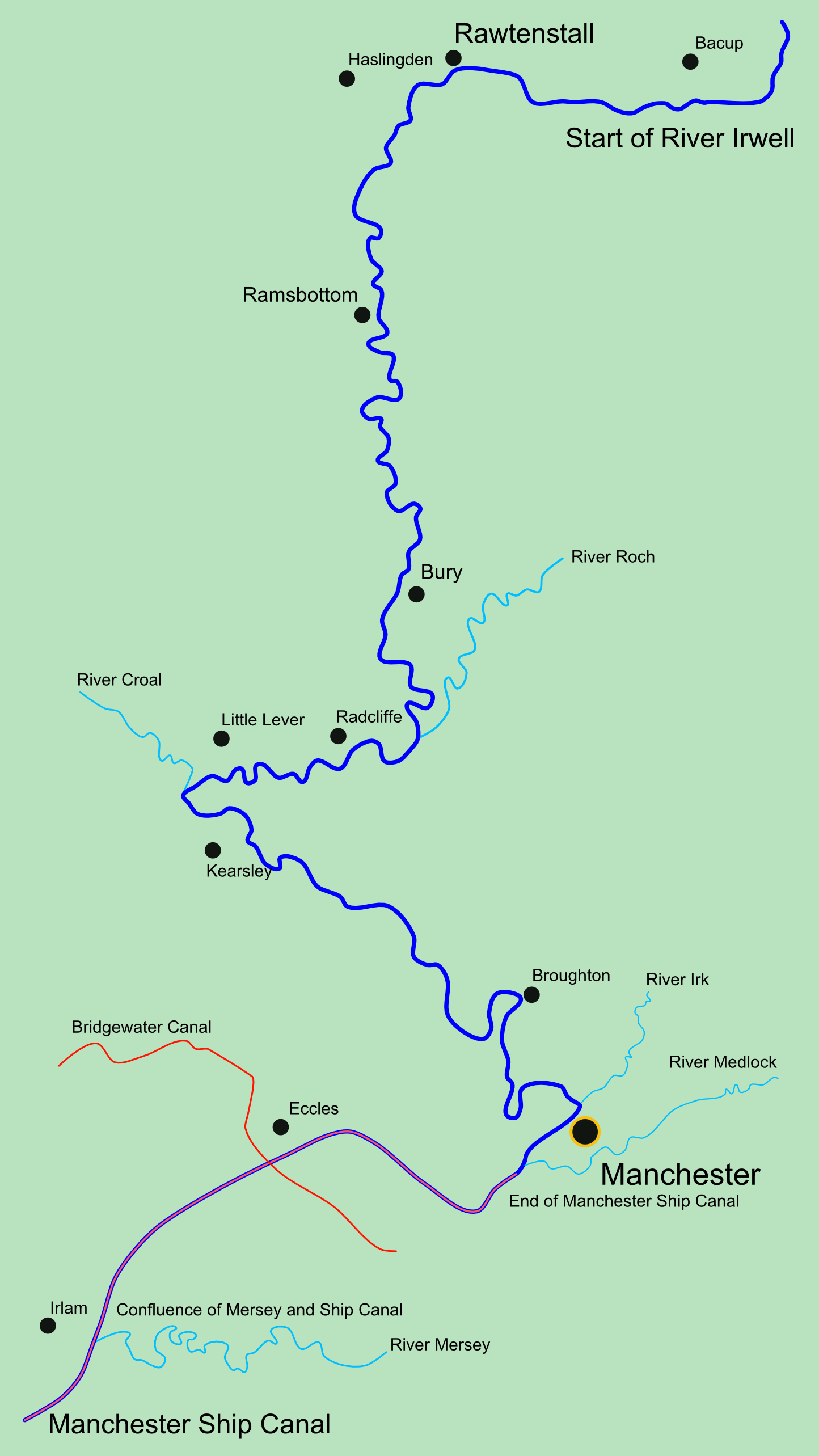
Course of the Irwell

== Geology ==
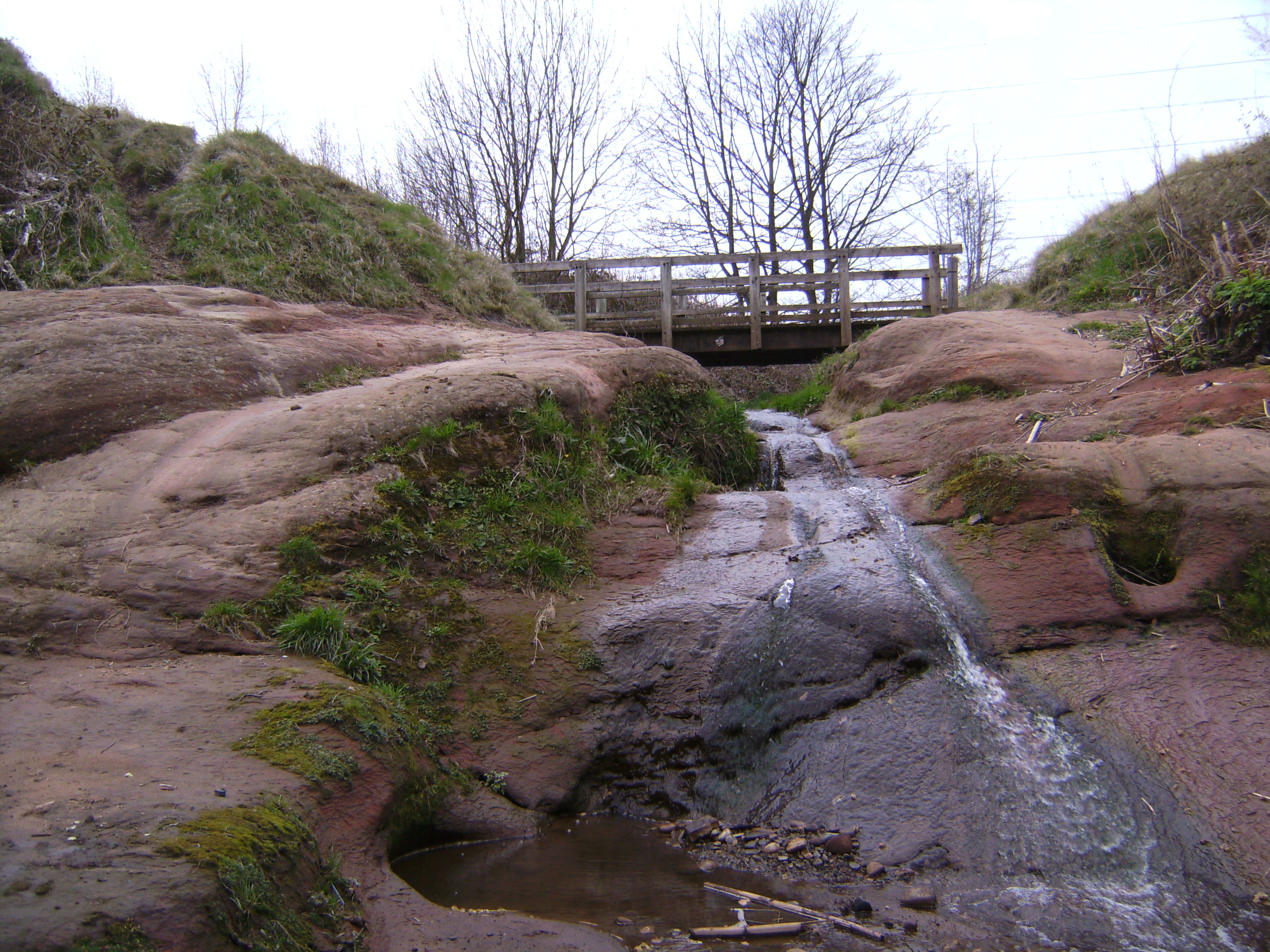
A tributary of the Irwell flowing over the New Red Sandstone at Clifton

Shallow seas covered most of south-east Lancashire in the Upper Carboniferous period when deposits of mud and sand were laid down. These later became beds of shales and sandstones alternating with layers of gritstone. There are also beds of New Red Sandstone and Manchester Marls. The glaciers of the Pleistocene epoch further shaped the landscape and then retreated, leaving behind deposits of sand, pebbles and boulder clay that formed the fluvioglacial ridges of the Irwell Valley. Ashclough, a 5.8 hectare (14.3 acre) site which comprises the steep banks of the river between Prestolee and Little Lever, has been designated a Site of Special Scientific Interest (SSSI) because of its geological interest, primarily because it is the best site in the area displaying Ashcough Marine Band and its associated strata. Ashclough is a site of national importance for interpreting the coal measure paleogeography of Great Britain.

== Industrial history ==
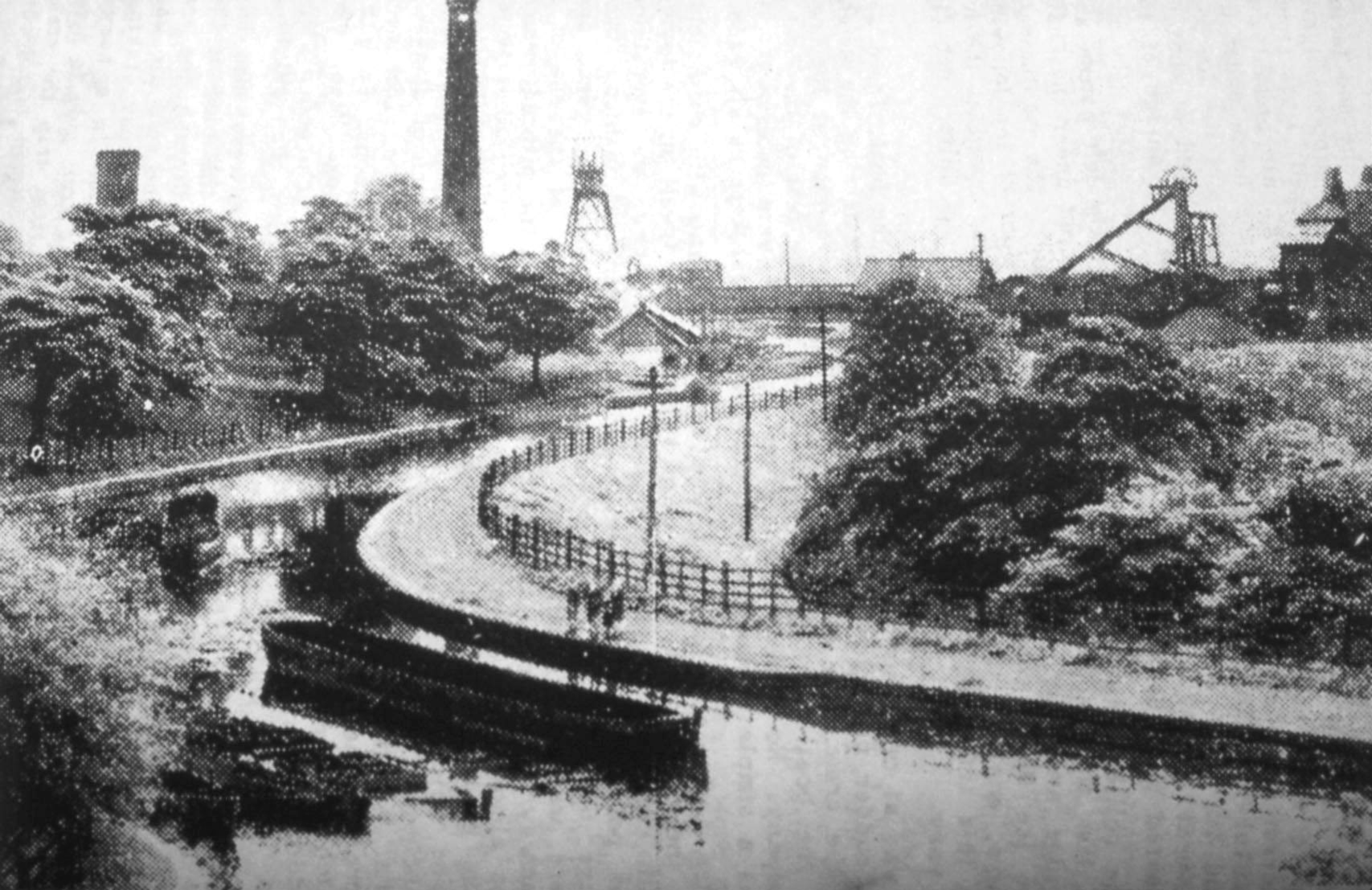
Ladyshore Colliery

During the Industrial Revolution factories, mills and terraced hovels grew up along the river banks and the region became filled with cotton mills, coal mines, print works, bleach works, dye works, chemical works, paper works, in fact almost every kind of industry. Wet Earth Colliery was located in the valley at Clifton, along with a number of bleach and dye works including Lever Bank Bleach Works. A number of canals were built to transport goods through the valley, the largest of which is the Manchester Ship Canal. Although many of the smaller canals were abandoned with the coming of the railways, isolated sections of the Manchester, Bolton and Bury Canal still remain, and there are plans to restore it for leisure purposes.

The waste from the industries along the Irwell polluted the river so heavily that by the 1850 it was virtually devoid of wildlife, however, since the late 19th century many attempts have made to improve the quality of the water. In 1891 the Mersey and Irwell Joint Committee was formed. This body ordered local authorities to provide sewage treatment facilities, and industrial concerns were told to use the best practical means of preventing pollution. In 1939 this body was superseded by the Lancashire Rivers Board, but wartime conditions brought about further deterioration of the river. In 1951 the Rivers (Prevention of Pollution) Act was passed and this board disappeared to be replaced by the Mersey River Board, which was replaced in turn by the Mersey and Weaver River Authority in 1965. In 1974 all the river authorities were merged into the Regional Water Authorities. Since then there has been a gradual improvement in water quality, and today wildlife is returning to the Irwell.

== Local wildlife ==
Some industrial waste products, such as spoil from mining, or alkaloids from other industrial processes were disposed of locally. Caustic waste from the Leblanc process was dumped on at least two sites - Nob End, to the south of Bolton and Lower Hinds in Bury. The waste on both sites has since weathered-down to calcium carbonate and has provided an ideal environment for a number of nationally rare calcicolous plants, unique in what is predominantly an area of acidic soil. These plants, along with non-indigenous garden escapees such as giant hogweed and Himalayan balsam, have added much variety to the flora of the valley. Nob End was designated as a Site of Special Scientific Interest in 1988 and a Local Nature Reserve in 2000.

The M60 passes through the valley and the bridge at junction 16 (A666) in Clifton is used as a summer roost for over 100 Daubenton's bats.

== Irwell Sculpture Trail ==
The Irwell Sculpture Trail is one of the largest public art initiatives and the longest sculpture trail in the UK. The trail consists of a scenically varied, 30-mile (48 km) walking route based on the well-established Irwell Valley Trail stretching from Salford Quays to the moors above Bacup. Since 1987 over 30 pieces of public art have been commissioned from regional, national and international artists.
