= Clifton, Greater Manchester =

Suburb in Greater Manchester

Coordinates: 53.5239°N 2.3203°W

Clifton
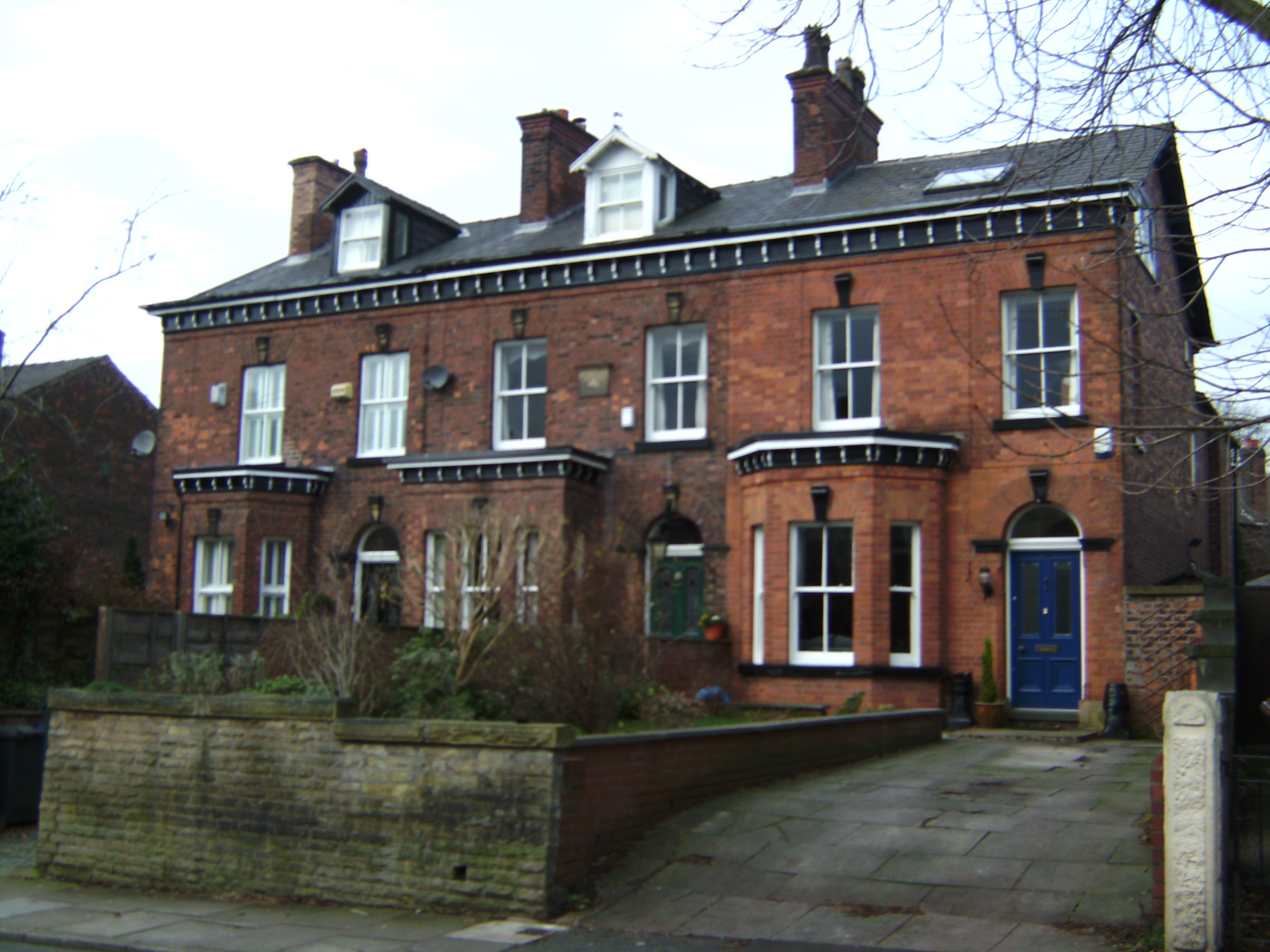
- Housing on Rake Lane near the railway station

- Location within Greater Manchester
- OS grid reference: SD775035
- Metropolitan borough: Salford
- Metropolitan county: Greater Manchester
- Region: North West
- Country: England
- Sovereign state: United Kingdom
- Post town: MANCHESTER
- Postcode district: M27
- Dialling code: 0161
- Police: Greater Manchester
- Fire: Greater Manchester
- Ambulance: North West
- UK Parliament: Salford

Clifton is a suburb of Swinton, in the Salford district, in Greater Manchester, England. It lies along the edge of Irwell Valley in the north of the City of Salford. Historically in Lancashire, it was a centre for coal mining, and once formed part of the Municipal Borough of Swinton and Pendlebury.

== History ==
Clifton is derived from the Old English clif and tun, and means the "settlement near a cliff, slope or riverbank". Clifton was mentioned in the Pipe Roll of 1183–84.

=== Coal mining ===
Clifton Hall Colliery was west of Lumns Lane, on the site now occupied by a domestic refuse and recycling site run by the Greater Manchester Waste Disposal Authority. The colliery was operating by 1820, and its tramway is shown on a parliamentary plan from 1830 and an 1845 map. It closed in 1929.

On 18 June 1885, an underground explosion at the colliery killed 178 men and boys. The inquest and the official report concluded that explosion was caused by firedamp igniting on contact with a candle. Blacksmith George Hindley (aged 16) and fireman George Higson, were part of a band of men who descended into the mine immediately after the explosion. They received an Albert Medal (2nd class) in recognition of their heroism.

Wet Earth Colliery in Clifton closed in 1928; its remains can still be seen in Clifton Country Park, close to the River Irwell and the Manchester-Preston railway line near the bottom of Clifton House Road, which runs uphill from the Irwell Valley to its junction with the A666 Manchester Road, opposite Clifton Cricket Ground.

=== Industry ===
The Pilkington's Lancastrian Pottery was established in 1892. The Chloride Electrical Storage Company opened its battery factory at Clifton Junction in 1893. Magnesium Elektron Ltd built a large factory at Clifton Junction to produce magnesium metal in 1936.

== Governance ==
Clifton was a township in the ecclesiastical parish of Eccles in the hundred of Salford in Lancashire. In 1866 Clifton became a separate civil parish, on 1 April 1933 the parish was abolished to form Swinton and Pendlebury, part also went to Kearsley and Clifton became part of the Municipal Borough of Swinton and Pendlebury and Kearsley Urban District. In 1931 the parish had a population of 2928.

== Geography ==
Clifton lies five miles north west of Manchester on the A666 road (Manchester Road) to Bolton. The township covered 850 acres in the valley of the River Irwell, which forms the north east boundary. The Manchester-Preston railway line passes through and there was a junction with the line to Bury and Rossendale which opened to Rawtenstall in September 1846. The highest land rises to over 300 feet above sea level in the west of the township near the Worsley boundary and is moss land. The underlying rocks are New Red Sandstone between Clifton and Ringley while the rest of the township lies on the Middle Coal Measures of the Manchester Coalfield. Much of Clifton's boundary with Pendlebury is defined by Slack Brook which flows eventually into the Irwell not far from where Agecroft Power Station once stood. Slack Brook has been largely culverted for many years under landfill tipping since the 1950s.

== Transport ==
Clifton is served by Clifton railway station on the Ribble Valley Line. In earlier times, the station was known as "Clifton Junction" from its location at the junction of the Manchester and Bolton Railway and Manchester, Bury and Rossendale Railway lines. The Bury line left the station/junction and passed over Clifton Viaduct, known locally as "the thirteen arches", across the Irwell Valley. Clifton Junction was important in bringing workers to the three large factories in the area, Magnesium Elektron Ltd (M.E.L.), Chloride Batteries and Pilkington's Tiles. The Manchester, Bolton and Bury Canal passed through Clifton. The Clifton Aqueduct carried the canal across the River Irwell. and is preserved as a Grade II listed building. There are plans to restore the canal for leisure use at a cost of over £50M.

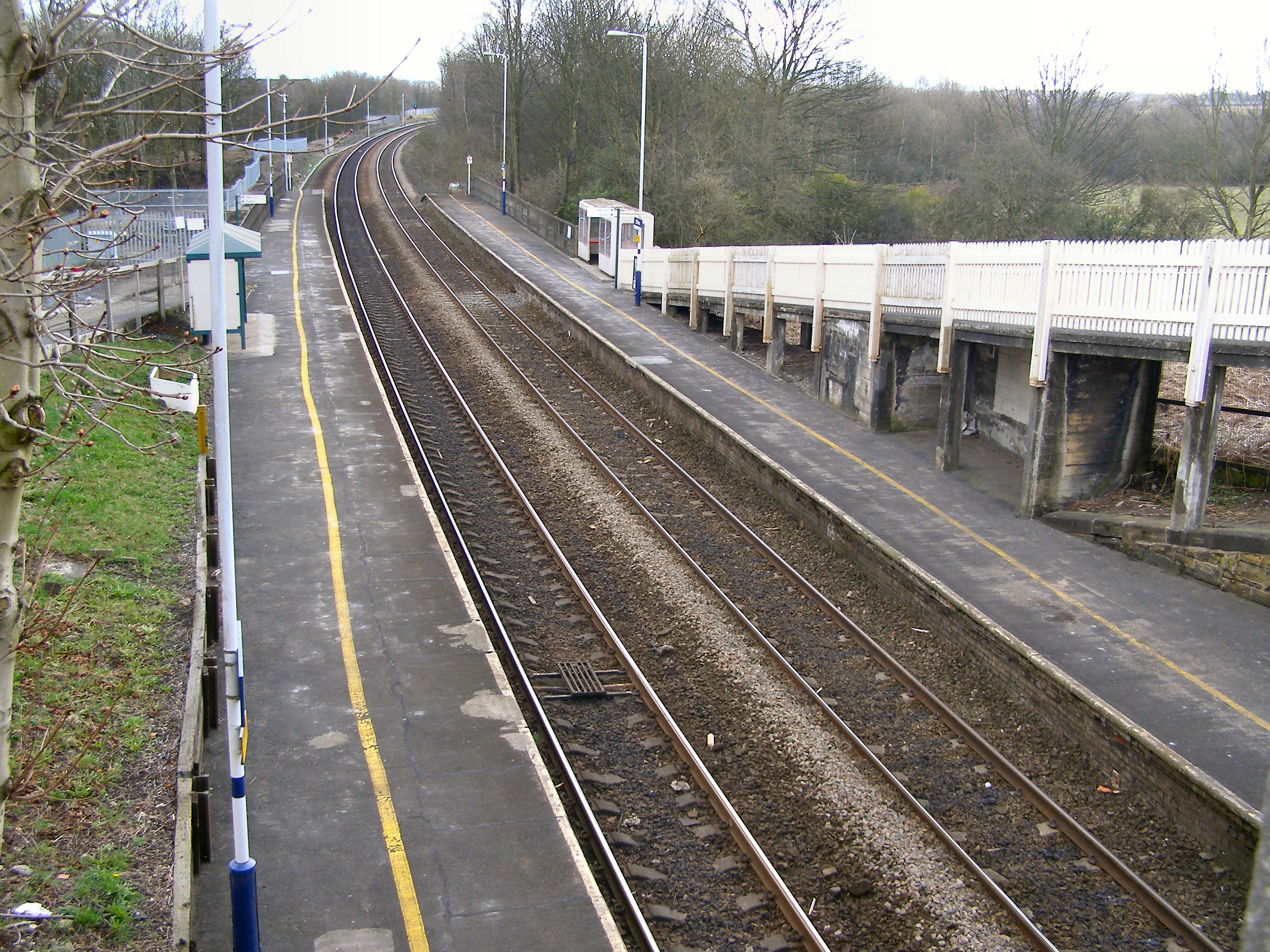
Clifton railway station.

== Churches ==
The area is served by two Anglican churches. St. Anne's has stood on Manchester Road since its completion in 1874. St. Thomas's on Delamere Avenue, off Rake Lane, was built in 1974 to replace an earlier building on Rake Lane opposite the junction with Whitehead Road. The earlier church was built in 1898 as a mission church to serve a small community of outlying farms and cottages. Composed of corrugated metal sheeting, it became known affectionately as “Th'owd Tin Mission” rather than St. Thomas's.

== Education ==
Clifton has two primary schools and a pupil referral unit within its boundaries:

Schools in Clifton
School	Locality	Description	Ofsted
Clifton Primary School	Wroe Street, Clifton, M27 6PF	Primary school	105907
St Mark's R.C. Primary School	Queensway, Clifton, M27 8QE	Primary school	105956
The Clifton Centre	Silverdale, Clifton, M27 8GW	Pupil referral unit	130007

== Clifton Library ==
Clifton Library is located on Wynne Avenue (formerly part of Rake Lane) in the Clifton Community Centre.

== Sport ==
Clifton Cricket Club play in the Premier Division of the Greater Manchester Cricket League. The Club have gone through a recent period of success with winning the GMCLT20 competition 3 times and becoming regional T20 champions. They also reached the finals of both the National ECB Club Vitality Blast and the Lancashire Knock Out. The club's ground is on Manchester Road not far from junction 16 of the M60 motorway.

Queensmere Dam off Queensway is leased from the Forestry Commission by Swinton and Pendlebury Anglers. Queensway was only built (across what was farmland) in the early 1960s to directly link much of Rake Lane and Lumns Lane (at the former Bee Hive public house - now Holyrood private nursery) with Bolton Road (A666), Pendlebury at its junction with Station Road (B5231) instead of having to use nearby Billy Lane. Before this, Queensmere Dam was known locally as simply "the Dam".

== Public houses ==
There are currently three public houses within Clifton. These are the Oddfellows Arms, the Golden Lion and the Robin Hood, all along the same side of Manchester Road. On Rake Lane, at the junction with Queensway, stands the Holyrood nursery which was, until recent times, the Beehive public house.

== Clifton Barracks ==
The British Army's Territorial Army Centre on Manchester Road, very close to junction 16 of the M60 motorway, is known locally by its informal title of "Clifton Barracks".

== See also ==
- Fletcher's Canal
