= Bamfurlong railway station =

Disused railway station in Bamfurlong, Wigan

Bamfurlong
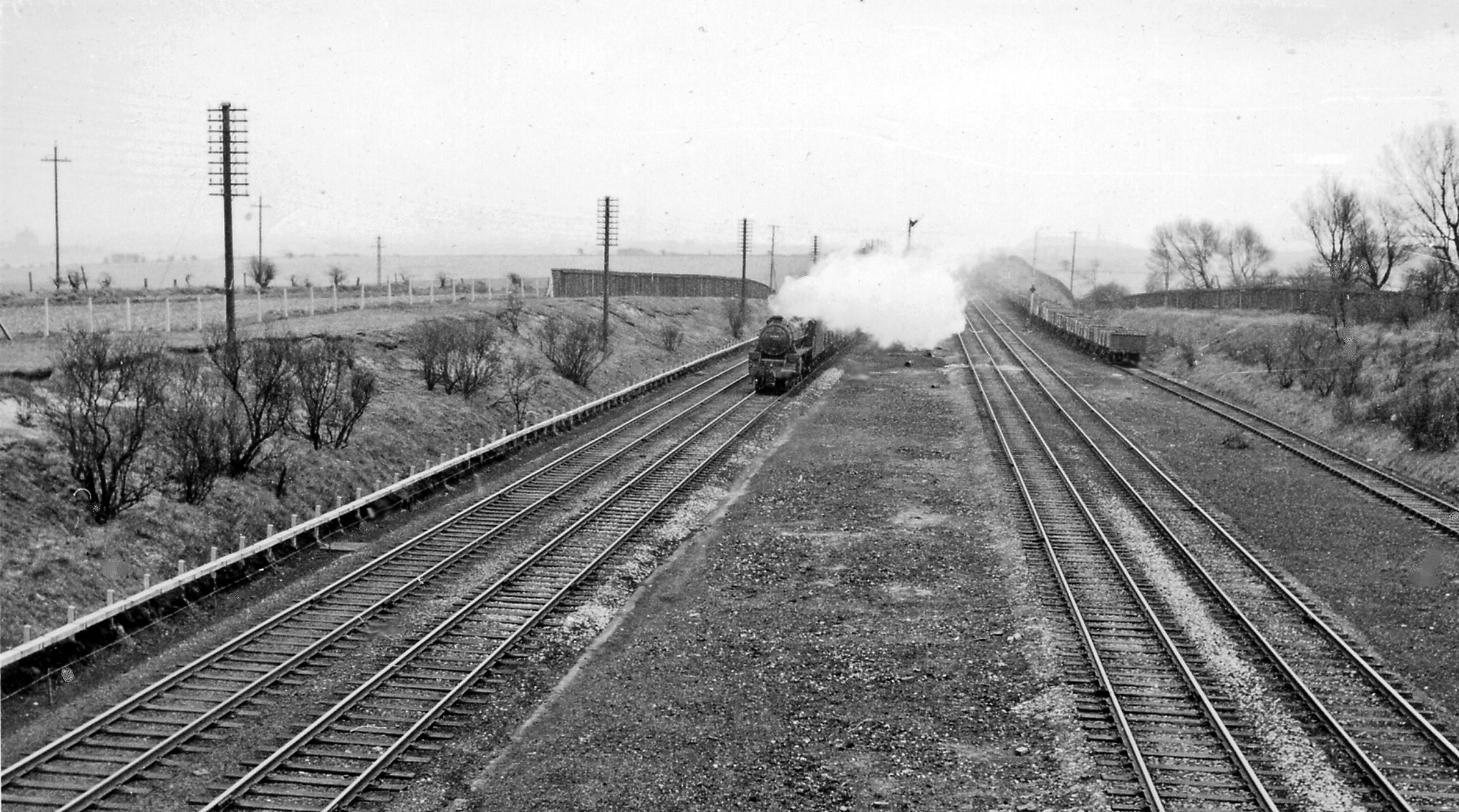
- Remains of the station in 1962

General information
- Location: Bamfurlong, Wigan; England
- Coordinates: 53.509377°N 2.604660°W
- Grid reference: SD600015
- Platforms: 2

Other information
- Status: Disused

History
- Original company: North Union Railway
- Pre-grouping: London and North Western Railway
- Post-grouping: London, Midland and Scottish Railway

Key dates
- 1 April 1878: Station opened
- 27 November 1950: Station closed completely
Location

Bamfurlong railway station served the village of Bamfurlong part of Abram, to the south of Wigan.

== The line before the station ==
The line was opened by the Wigan Branch Railway (WBR) in 1832 from Parkside to Wigan as a single track with passing places although the trackbed had been engineered for double track. In 1834 the WBR became part of the North Union Railway (NUR) and they doubled the track in time for the opening of the line northwards to Preston in 1838.

From 1 January 1846 the NUR was leased jointly by the Grand Junction Railway (GJR) and the Manchester and Leeds Railway (M&LR). Later in 1846 the leases passed, by amalgamation from the GJR to the London and North Western Railway (L&NWR) and from the M&LR to the Lancashire and Yorkshire Railway.

== The station ==
The station opened on 1 April 1878. It stood immediately south of Lily lane, which became the A58, as it bridged over the line in the village of Bamfurlong, 2 miles 47 chains (4.2 km) from Wigan North Western. (Note: Railways in the United Kingdom are, for historical reasons, measured in miles and chains. A chain is 22 yards (20 m) long, there are 80 chains to the mile.) It was located in a cutting to the west of Bamfurlong Hall. There were no facilities for goods traffic, the station was only provided for passenger and parcel traffic.

The station building was on the east platform, to the south of the road overbridge which crossed the platforms, which extended under the bridge at the north. The building was a two-storey brick-built building accessed from Lily Lane with the booking hall at road level, steps went down to each platform, the west-side platform steps descending from a pedestrian bridge crossing the lines. There was a wooden shelter on each platform. The maps and photographs show a line to the west of the station, this was a mineral line connecting Cross Tetly's Bamfurlong and Mains Collieries. At the time of opening the station hosted four trains to and five from Wigan.

The running lines through the station site were quadrupled in 1892 with "fast" lines being provided to the east of the station, these lines effectively by-passed the station.

In 1922 thirteen northbound and twelve southbound services called at Bamfurlong on Mondays to Saturdays, most were local services. Northbound they mainly started from Warrington, with two starting from Crewe, two from Liverpool Lime Street and one from Hartford. All went to Wigan, three terminated at Preston and one at Carlisle. Southbound they mostly started from Wigan, the first train, the 0623, began at Preston. Destinations were mostly Warrington with two services running short journeys to Earlestown and one going onto Hartford. There were no Sunday services.

Services under the London, Midland and Scottish Railway (LMS) remained much the same as previously, in 1939 there were 17 services in each direction on weekdays, mostly local trains between Warrington and Wigan with one service from Liverpool, one from Crewe and a few shortened services terminating at Newton-le-Willows, there were slightly less trains on Saturdays and six on Sundays.

The station closed on 27 November 1950.

== After closure ==
Following the dismantling of Bamfurlong railway station, a platform remained for many years, increasingly overgrown. By 2015 the only remaining evidence was the track alignment.

Local passenger traffic ceased between Crewe and Preston via Earlestown on 6 October 1969.

The lines through the station site were electrified as part of the West Coast Main Line (WCML) modernisation in 1974, this involved the bridge carrying Lily Lane to be rebuilt during the period 1970–1 to provide additional clearance.

The lines through the station site are still open in 2020.

Preceding station	Historical railways	Following station
Wigan	London and North Western Railway; North Union Railway; 1878 - 1889; Leased line	Golborne
Wigan	London and North Western Railway; 1889 - 1923; NUR dissolved	Golborne
Wigan	London, Midland and Scottish Railway; London and North Western Railway; 1923 - 1924; Grouping	Golborne
Wigan North Western; Station renamed Wigan North Western	London, Midland and Scottish Railway; London and North Western Railway; 1924 - 1948; Grouping	Golborne
Wigan North Western	London, Midland and Scottish Railway; London and North Western Railway; 1948 - 1949; Grouping	Golborne South; Station renamed Golborne South
	Current situation	
Wigan North Western; Line and station open	Bamfurlong; Line open, station closed in 1950	Golborne South; Line open, station closed
