= Golborne South railway station =

Former railway station in England

Golborne South

General information
- Location: Golborne, Wigan; England
- Coordinates: 53.478425°N 2.595052°W
- Grid reference: SJ606981
- Platforms: 2

Other information
- Status: Disused

History
- Original company: North Union Railway
- Pre-grouping: London and North Western Railway
- Post-grouping: London, Midland and Scottish Railway

Key dates
- by 19 October 1839: Station opened as "Golborne Gate"
- by 1847: Station known as "Golborne"
- 1 February 1949: Renamed "Golborne South"
- 2 February 1961: Station closed to passengers
- 22 May 1967: Station closed completely
Location

Golborne South railway station was one of two stations serving the town of Golborne, to the south of Wigan. The station was opened in 1839 and closed to passengers in 1961 and goods in 1967. It is proposed for reopening, with the potential to open in 2028.

== History ==
=== The early line and station to 1849 ===
The line was opened by the Wigan Branch Railway (WBR) in 1832 from Parkside to Wigan as a single track with passing places although the trackbed had been engineered for double track. In 1834 the WBR became part of the North Union Railway (NUR) and they doubled the track in time for the opening of the line northwards to Preston in 1838.

The line had opened two years after the opening of the Liverpool and Manchester Railway (L&MR) with which it connected at Parkside, it was operated under contract by the L&MR and likely followed L&MR practices. On the L&MR intermediate stopping places were neither advertised nor provided with facilities, they were mostly situated at level crossings where a policeman or gateman was permanently on duty, passengers wishing to use the stopping place informed the staff who signalled the requirement to stop to the train crew,

The WBR had one crossing on the level, at Golborne, 1 mile 72 chains (3.1 km) from Parkside, (Note: Railways in the United Kingdom are, for historical reasons, measured in miles and chains. A chain is 22 yards (20 m) long, there are 80 chains to the mile.) where the Warrington to Wigan turnpike crossed the railway at a gated level crossing known as Golborne Gates and this would have been an identified stopping place on the line and therefore may have operated as a station in the same way as on the L&MR. A more formal station was probably opened as Golborne Gate or Gates by the North Union Railway (NUR) probably sometime before 1839 as the station started to appear on the maps in Bradshaw from then, fares to intermediate stations, including Golbourne Gate [sic] were published in 1839. (Note: Gate according to Quick (2022), but labelled Gates in Bradshaw (1839 - 1844)) By 1847 the station was known as Golborne and it appeared in Bradshaw in a route-table with times for the trains shown. There were four services from the station northbound to Preston and southbound to both Liverpool and Manchester on weekdays. (Note: There were some connections available to Birmingham and London that utilised some train re-organisation, see Lowton for details.) As late as 1849 the OS map shows the level crossing but no station or structure.

From 1 January 1846 the NUR was leased jointly by the Grand Junction Railway (GJR) and the Manchester and Leeds Railway (M&LR). Later in 1846 the leases passed, by amalgamation from the GJR to the London and North Western Railway (L&NWR) and from the M&LR to the Lancashire and Yorkshire Railway.

=== L&NWR from 1850 ===
The L&NWR replaced the level crossing with a road overbridge carrying High Street/Church Road (which became the A573), on a slightly further north alignment sometime around 1867-68. (Note: Authority to do so was obtained under an act of Parliament, the London and North Western Railway (New Works and Additional Powers) Act 1867 (30 & 31 Vict. c. cxliv).) The station was rebuilt sometime between the new road being completed and the OS map being issued in 1893. (Note: No evidence ha been found of an opening date. It is likely that it opened on 1 April 1878, the same date as Bamfurlong a little further along the line as the construction of their main buildings is very similar, the Bamfurlong opening is documented.) The station was built on the original lines of the WBR which became the slow lines when the line was quadrupled, the fast lines by-passed the station to the east. The station building was on the east side platform, to the south of the road overbridge which crossed the platforms about half-way along their length. The building was a two-storey brick-built building accessed from the bridge with the booking hall at road level, steps went down to each platform, the west-side platform steps descending from a pedestrian bridge crossing the lines. There was a brick built shelter on each platform.

During the late 1800s more railways opened and traffic increased. (Note: For example, on the L&NWR freight traffic increased from 9 million to 35 million tons per year between 1865 and 1900, much of it on the main line. Passenger numbers increased considerably around this time as the population became more mobile, see Simmons (1995) for example.) The line through Golborne, as part of the main western trunk route to Scotland, became congested and between 1888 and 1894 the lines through the station site were quadrupled.

There were two signal boxes in the station vicinity one to the south west of the running lines that controlled the goods yard, and one to the north of the eastern platform, between the slow and fast lines, which controlled access to Golborne Colliery. The goods yard had two, later three sidings on the west side of the running lines and a warehouse, it was able to accommodate most types of goods including live stock and was equipped with a five ton crane.

In 1895 there were 11 local services on weekdays in each direction, northbound all going to Wigan and southbound to Warrington except for one service, the 1453, which went to Liverpool Lime Street.

In 1922 thirteen services called at Golborne in each direction on Mondays to Saturdays, most were local services. Northbound they mainly started from Warrington, with two starting from Crewe, two from Liverpool Lime Street and one from Hartford. All went to Wigan, three terminated at Preston and one at Carlisle. Southbound they mostly started from Wigan, the first train, the 0628, began at Preston and the 0710 started from Golborne itself. Destinations were mostly Warrington with two services running short journeys to Earlestown and one going onto Hartford. There were two Sunday services in each direction.

=== Post L&NWR and closure ===
Services under the London, Midland and Scottish Railway (LMS) remained much the same as previously, in 1939 there were 17 services in each direction on weekdays, mostly local trains between Warrington and Wigan with one service from Liverpool, one from Crewe and a few shortened services terminating at Newton-le-Willows, there were slightly less trains on Saturdays and six on Sundays.

The station was renamed Golborne South on 1 January 1949 to avoid confusion with the close by ex-Great Central/LNER Golborne North station. The station closed to passengers on 6 February 1961 and to goods traffic on 22 May 1967.

=== Post-closure ===
Local passenger traffic ceased between Crewe and Preston via Earlestown on 6 October 1969.

The lines through the station site were electrified as part of the West Coast Main Line (WCML) modernisation in 1974.

Preceding station	Historical railways	Following station
Wigan Chapel Lane	Wigan Branch Railway; 1832 – 1834	Parkside
Wigan Chapel Lane	North Union Railway; Wigan Branch Railway; 1834 – 1838; Amalgamated	Parkside
Wigan; Station re-sited and renamed	North Union Railway; Wigan Branch Railway; 1838 – 1847	Parkside
Wigan	London and North Western Railway; North Union Railway; 1847 – c1850 Leased line	North Union Junction; New station
Wigan	London and North Western Railway; North Union Railway c1850 – 1864; Leased line	Preston Junction; Station renamed
Wigan	London and North Western Railway; North Union Railway; 1864 - 1877; Leased line	Preston Junction
Wigan	London and North Western Railway; North Union Railway; 1864 - 1877; Leased line	Warrington Bank Quay; Winwick cut-off opened
Wigan	London and North Western Railway; North Union Railway; 1877 - 1878; Leased line	Lowton and Preston Junction; Station renamed
Wigan	London and North Western Railway; North Union Railway; 1877 - 1878; Leased line	Warrington Bank Quay
Bamfurlong; New station	London and North Western Railway; North Union Railway; 1878 - 1880; Leased line	Lowton and Preston Junction
Bamfurlong; New station	London and North Western Railway; North Union Railway; 1878 - 1880; Leased line	Warrington Bank Quay
Bamfurlong	London and North Western Railway; North Union Railway; 1880 - 1889; Leased line	Lowton; Station renamed
Bamfurlong	London and North Western Railway; North Union Railway; 1880 - 1889; Leased line	Warrington Bank Quay
Bamfurlong	London and North Western Railway; 1889 - 1923; NUR dissolved	Lowton
Bamfurlong	London and North Western Railway; 1889 - 1923; NUR dissolved	Warrington Bank Quay
Bamfurlong	London, Midland and Scottish Railway; London and North Western Railway; 1923 - 1948; Grouping	Lowton
Bamfurlong	London, Midland and Scottish Railway; London and North Western Railway; 1923 - 1948; Grouping	Warrington Bank Quay
Bamfurlong	BR(LMR); London, Midland and Scottish Railway; 1948 - 1949; Nationalisation	Lowton
Bamfurlong	BR(LMR); London, Midland and Scottish Railway; 1948 - 1949; Nationalisation	Warrington Bank Quay
Bamfurlong	BR(LMR); London, Midland and Scottish Railway; 1948 - 1949; Station renamed Golborne South	Lowton
Bamfurlong	BR(LMR); London, Midland and Scottish Railway; 1948 - 1949; Station renamed Golborne South	Warrington Bank Quay

== Reopening ==
In 2021, the Greater Manchester Combined Authority approved the spending of £16 million on a new station for Golborne. Transport for Greater Manchester subsequently commenced a public consultation in January 2024 proposing building the new station on a site to the south of the previous station.

In November 2024, plans were submitted to construct a two-platform station at a cost of £32 million. The station would be served by an hourly service between Wigan and Manchester.

Preliminary construction work began on 1 August 2026. The station could open for services in 2028.
