= Lowton railway station =

Former railway station in England

Lowton

General information
- Location: Lowton, Wigan; England
- Coordinates: 53.458112°N 2.598718°W
- Grid reference: SJ604959
- Platforms: 2

Other information
- Status: Disused

History
- Original company: North Union Railway
- Pre-grouping: London and North Western Railway
- Post-grouping: London, Midland and Scottish Railway

Key dates
- 1 January 1847: Opened
- 1 February 1877: Renamed to "Lowton and Preston Junction"
- 17 February 1880: Renamed "Lowton"
- 1 January 1917: Closed as a wartime economy measure
- 1 February 1919: Reopened
- 26 September 1949: Closed
Location

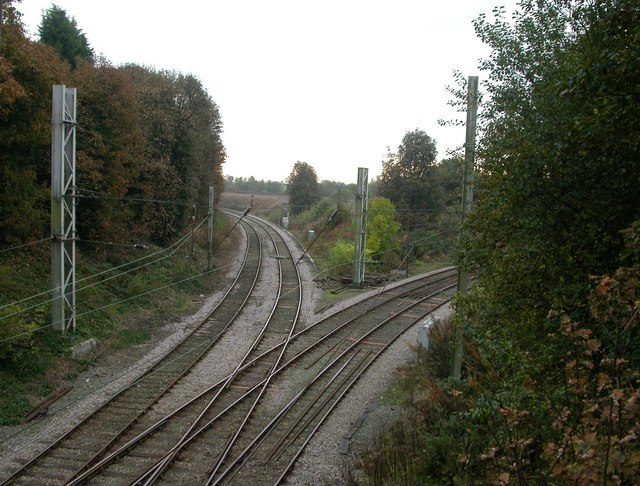
Lowton railway junction

Lowton railway station served the village named Town of Lowton to the east of Newton-le-Willows and south of Golborne.

== Location ==
It stood immediately east of a crossroads known locally as "Newton Four Lane Ends", to the north was Golborne Dale Road and south was Parkside Lane (later Warrington Road, then Parkside Road), this north–south road became the A573. To the east was Newton Road and west was Southworth Road, the A572. The station was in a cutting at the northern apex of a triangle of lines off the original Liverpool and Manchester Railway (L&MR), on the northbound line of the North Union Railway to Wigan.

== The station ==
The station was a single storey wooden building on the east side of the line where the two lines diverged south of Southworth Road, the southbound platform was of low construction and ran from the station building back towards Southworth Road overbridge, this platform then ran under the road bridge and northwards at a more normal height. The northbound platform was opposite the higher section of southbound platform all to the north of Southworth Road and had a shelter. The station building and southbound platform was accessed by steps down from the road overbridge. The northbound platform was accessed by a ramped road from Southworth Road. Lowton signal box was opposite the station building was an unusually high structure necessary to see the lines to the north over the road overbridge. Carriage sidings were located to the south of the station alongside the east curve but there were no goods facilities at the station.

== The line and services ==
=== Prior to the station opening ===
The Wigan Branch Railway (WBR) opened a line on 3 September 1832 from Wigan to connect with the Liverpool and Manchester Railway (L&MR) with an east curve (that is towards Manchester) near Parkside.

In 1834 the WBR became part of the North Union Railway (NUR). From 1 January 1846 the NUR was leased jointly by the Grand Junction Railway (GJR) and the Manchester and Leeds Railway (M&LR). Later in 1846 the leases passed, by amalgamation from the GJR to the London and North Western Railway (L&NWR) and from the M&LR to the Lancashire and Yorkshire Railway. (Note: Ownership of the station is unclear, the Act to open the west curve to the L&MR line was applied for by the GJR which was amalgamated to become the L&NWR before it opened, the curve would therefore appear to belong to the L&NWR, however the station is situated north of the curves, on what was the NUR line, at the time of its opening leased jointly to the L&NWR and the L&YR. The L&NWR operated this section of line.)

=== Early L&NWR 1847 - 1864 ===
On 1 January 1847 the L&NWR opened a west curve onto the L&MR and Lowton station was opened at the juncture of the two curves, probably at the same time or shortly afterwards. (Note: There is some confusion about the opening date of the station. Quick (2022) reports it as 1 January 1847, the same time as the west curve was opened, citing Holt and a Company notice. Both the first edition of Holt in 1976 and the revised 2nd edition with Biddle in 1986 say a station was opened at the junction but not when. Bradshaw records the station from March 1847 and this is supported by contemporary newspapers, for example the Liverpool Mercury, Butt (1995) also gives 1 January 1847 as the opening date. On the other hand, Sweeney (2008) states it opened on 26 September 1849 and this is supported by The Ordnance Survey Lancashire CII map of 1849 which shows the Junction and Four lane Ends but not a station. The survey for the map was done in 1845-47.) In its early days it was known as Preston Junction in the timetables between Liverpool and Manchester and North Union Junction in the north/southbound timetables, Bradshaw (1847) notes the latter timetable as the Preston & Parkside section of the L&NWR. By 1850 this practice appears to have ceased, both tables in Bradshaw showing the station name as Preston Junction.

This was the stations busiest period. Timetables showed the services to Preston Junction among the Liverpool to and from Manchester services with a note "By the trains marked N.U. being especially North Union Trains, the passengers for Manchester or Liverpool will be detained unavoidably at Preston Junction until the arrival of the trains from Preston". The north–south services were usually shown in a different table, for example in Bradshaw (1847) the Preston & Parkside section shows the same services departing Manchester and Liverpool going via North Union Junction to Wigan and Preston. These trains comprised through northbound carriages from both Manchester and Liverpool which met the southbound service from Preston at the station, the trains were re-organised before proceeding onwards in three different directions (towards Preston, Manchester and Liverpool), quite how this was achieved at the simple diverging double track at the junction is not known. The following table shows the passenger trains through the station on a weekday in 1847, on Sundays there were two trains in each direction to Liverpool and Manchester and only the mail trains to and from the south, details have been extracted from Bradshaw. There will have been a considerable amount of freight traffic using the same lines.

1847 Passenger trains passing through the station
Arrival from	Departure Time	Departure to	Type	Notes
London	0445*	Preston, Lancaster & Carlisle	Mail	Does not call here
Carlisle, Lancaster & Preston	0605	London; Manchester; Liverpool	Mail, 1st & 2nd	Train divides into 3
Manchester; Liverpool	0825	Preston	1st on L&MR; 1st, 2nd & 3rd on NUR	Trains combine, connects with following train Only stops on L&MR to pick up for passengers North of Preston Junction
Preston	0836	Manchester; Liverpool	1st, 2nd & 3rd on NUR; 1st on L&MR	Train divides into 2, connects with previous train Only stops on L&MR to drop off passengers from North of Preston Junction
Manchester; Liverpool	0935*	Preston with connection to Fleetwood, Blackpool and Lytham	Select 1st on L&MR; 1st, 2nd fast on NUR	Trains combine, does not pick up passengers here
Preston	0945	Manchester; Liverpool	1st & 2nd fast	L&NWR service (not NUR); Train divides into 2
Manchester; Liverpool	1111	Preston, Lancaster & Carlisle	1st on L&MR; 1st, 2nd & 3rd on NUR	Trains combine, connects with 1135 train Only stops on L&MR to pick up for passengers North of Preston Junction
Preston	1120*	London	1st & 2nd	Does not call here
Preston	1135	Manchester; Liverpool	1st, 2nd stopping on NUR; 1st on L&MR	Train divides into 2, connects with 1111 train Only stops on L&MR to drop off passengers from North of Preston Junction
Manchester; Liverpool	1416	Preston	2nd on L&MR; 1st, 2nd stopping on NUR	Trains combine, connects with following train Only stops on L&MR to pick up for passengers North of Preston Junction
Preston	1428	Manchester; Liverpool	1st, 2nd stopping on NUR; 2nd on L&MR	Train divides into 2, connects with previous train Only stops on L&MR to drop off passengers from North of Preston Junction
London	1435*	Preston, Lancaster & Carlisle	1st & 2nd	Does not call here
Manchester; Liverpool	1628	Preston	Select 1st on L&MR; 1st, 2nd fast on NUR	Trains combine, connects with 1658 train Only stops on L&MR to pick up for passengers North of Preston Junction
London	1640*	Preston, Lancaster & Carlisle	mail	Does not call here
Preston	1645*	London	express	Does not call here
Preston	1658	Manchester; Liverpool	1st & 2nd	Train divides into 2, connects with 1628 train Only stops on L&MR to drop off passengers from North of Preston Junction
Manchester; Liverpool	1953	Preston	2nd on L&MR; 1st, 2nd & 3rd on NUR	Trains combine, connects with following train Only stops on L&MR to pick up for passengers North of Preston Junction
Preston	2006	Manchester; Liverpool	1st, 2nd & 3rd on NUR; 2nd on L&MR	Train divides into 2, connects with previous train Only stops on L&MR to drop off passengers from North of Preston Junction
Carlisle, Lancaster & Preston	2040	Manchester; London	1st & 2nd mail	Train divides into 2
London	2240*	Preston	express	Does not call here
* Timings marked * are approximate and not provided by Bradshaw

By 1850 the five NUR trains had been reduced to four.

=== Later L&NWR 1864 - 1922/1923 ===
The station lost some traffic and importance in 1864 when the Winwick cut-off route between Winwick to the south and Golborne to the north, the cut-off became the main west-coast route.

The station was renamed to Lowton and Preston Junction on 1 February 1877 and finally Lowton in 1880. (Note: Quick (2022) records that L&NW Officers recommended the change to Lowton on 17 February 1880 but they did not seem sure whether the name they were moving from was Lowton & Preston Junction or Preston Junction and Lowton. Sweeney (2008) reports that the station was known in L&NWR timetables as Lowton Junction from February 1877.)

In 1895 there were 10 local services on weekdays in each direction, northbound all going to Wigan and southbound to Warrington except for one service, the 1445, which went to Liverpool Lime Street.

Lowton was closed from 1 January 1917 to 1 February 1919 probably as a wartime economy measure.

In 1922 twelve services called at Lowton in each direction on Mondays to Saturdays, most were local services. Northbound they mainly started from Warrington, with two starting from Crewe, two from Liverpool Lime Street and one from Hartford. All went to Wigan, three terminated at Preston and one at Carlisle. Southbound they mostly started from Wigan with only two early services starting elsewhere, first train, the 0633, began at Preston and the following train, the 0714, from Golborne. Destinations were mostly Warrington with two services running short journeys to Earlestown and one going onto Hartford. There was no Sunday service.

=== Post L&NWR to station closure ===
Services under the London, Midland and Scottish Railway (LMS) remained much the same as previously, in 1939 there were 15 services in each direction on weekdays, mostly local trains between Warrington and Wigan with one service from Liverpool, one from Crewe and a few shortened services terminating at Newton-le-Willows, there were slightly less trains on Saturdays and none on Sundays.

The station closed on 26 September 1949.

=== The line after the station closed ===
Local passenger traffic ceased between Crewe and Preston via Earlestown on 6 October 1969.

The lines from Newton-le-Willows through the west facing Parkside junction and Lowton junction formed a secondary West Coast Main Line (WCML) route that was electrified as part of the WCML modernisation which was completed in 1974. Electrification needed Southworth Road overbridge to be rebuilt to provide the necessary clearance.

The east facing curve and the main line between Newton-le-Willows and Castlefield Junction in Manchester was electrified on 9 December 2013.

The lines through the station site are still open in 2020.

Preceding station	Historical railways	Following station
Golborne	London and North Western Railway; North Union Railway; 1847 - 1878	Parkside
Golborne	London and North Western Railway; North Union Railway; 1847 - 1878	Newton Bridge
Golborne	London and North Western Railway; North Union Railway; 1878 - 1889	Kenyon Junction (Parkside closed)
Golborne	London and North Western Railway; North Union Railway; 1878 - 1889	Newton Bridge
Golborne	London and North Western Railway; 1889 - 1923 (NUR dissolved)	Kenyon Junction
Golborne	London and North Western Railway; 1889 - 1923 (NUR dissolved)	Newton-le-Willows (station renamed)
Golborne	London, Midland and Scottish Railway; London and North Western Railway; 1923 - 1948 (Grouping)	Kenyon Junction
Golborne	London, Midland and Scottish Railway; London and North Western Railway; 1923 - 1948 (Grouping)	Newton-le-Willows
Golborne	BR(LMR); London, Midland and Scottish Railway; 1948 - 1949 (Nationalisation)	Kenyon Junction
Golborne	BR(LMR); London, Midland and Scottish Railway; 1948 - 1949 (Nationalisation)	Newton-le-Willows
	Current situation	
Golborne South; Line open, station closed	Lowton; Line open, station closed	Kenyon Junction; Line open, station closed
Golborne South; Line open, station closed	Lowton; Line open, station closed	Newton-le-Willows; Line and station open
