= Hartford station =

Hartford station may refer to:

- Hartford Union Station, the major station in Hartford, Connecticut, United States
- Hartford railway station, in the village of Hartford, Cheshire, England

== See also ==
- Hertford North railway station, in Hertford, England
- Hertford East railway station, in Hertford, England
