= Preston and Wigan Railway =

Early British railway

Overview
- Locale: Lancashire
- Dates of operation: 22 April 1831–22 May 1834
- Successor: North Union Railway

Technical
- Track gauge: 4 ft 8 1/2 in (1,435 mm) standard gauge

The Preston and Wigan Railway would have been an early British railway company operating in Lancashire.

Preston and Wigan Railway Act 1831
- Act of Parliament
- Parliament of the United Kingdom
- Long title: An Act for making and maintaining a Railway from the Borough of Wigan to the Borough of Preston, both in the County Palatine of Lancaster, and collateral Branches to communicate therewith.
- Citation: 1 Will. 4. c. lvi

Dates
- Royal assent: 22 April 1831

Other legislation
- Repealed by: North Union Railway Act 1834

Status: Repealed

Text of statute as originally enacted

The Preston and Wigan Railway obtained an act of Parliament, the Preston and Wigan Railway Act 1831 (1 Will. 4. c. lvi) on 22 April 1831 to build a 15 miles 30 chains (24.7 km) line between Wigan and Preston. (Note: Railways in the United Kingdom are, for historical reasons, measured in miles and chains. A chain is 22 yards (20 m) long, there are 80 chains to the mile.) (Note: An Act for making and maintaining a Railway from the Borough of Wigan to the Borough of Preston, both in the County Palatine of Lancaster, and collateral Branches to communicate therewith.)

On 8 August 1833 the board decided that it would be to their advantage to amalgamate with the Wigan Branch Railway, the directors of the Wigan Branch Railway met shortly thereafter and agreed with them. The North Union Railway Act 1834 (4 & 5 Will. 4. c. xxv) was approved and gained royal assent on 22 May 1834 incorporating the two railways as the North Union Railway. It was the first-ever amalgamation of railway companies. (Note: An Act for uniting the Wigan Branch Railway Company and the Preston and Wigan Railway Company; for authorizing an Alteration to be made in the Line of the last-mentioned Railway; and for repealing, altering, and amending the Acts relating to the said Railways)

The line was formally opened by the North Union Railway on 21 October 1838 and to the public on 31 October.

== Bibliography ==
- Awdry, Christopher (1990). Encyclopaedia of British Railway Companies. Sparkford: Patrick Stephens Ltd. ISBN 1-8526-0049-7. OCLC 19514063. CN 8983.
- Grant, Donald J. (2017). Directory of the Railway Companies of Great Britain (1st ed.). Kibworth Beauchamp, Leicestershire: Troubador Publishing Ltd. ISBN 978-1-78803-768-6.
- Jacobs, Gerald (2009). "Railway Mileages". In Bridge, Mike (ed.). TRACKatlas of Mainland Britain. Bradford on Avon: Trackmaps. ISBN 978-0-9549866-5-0.
- Marshall, John (1969). The Lancashire & Yorkshire Railway. Vol. 1. Newton Abbot: David & Charles. ISBN 978-0-7153-4352-4.
- Sweeney, Dennis (2008), The Wigan Branch Railway, Triangle Publishing, ISBN 978-0-9550030-35
