= Hertford railway station =

There are two railway stations in Hertford:

- Hertford East railway station on the Hertford East Branch Line
- Hertford North railway station on the Hertford Loop Line

== See also ==
- Hartford railway station in Cheshire
