= Lightshaw Hall =

Listed building in Golborne, Greater Manchester, England

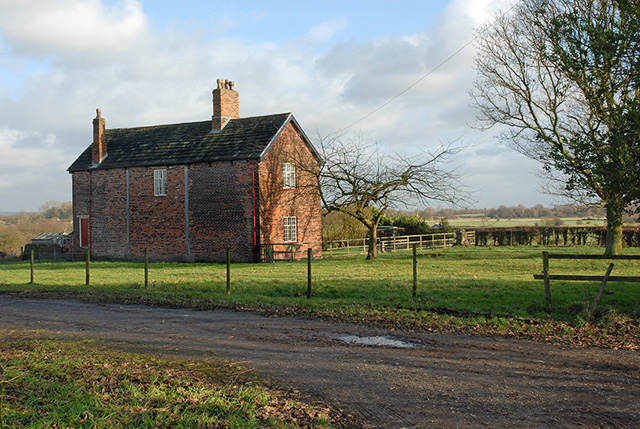
- Lightshaw Hall in 2006

- Location within Greater Manchester

General information
- Location: Lightshaw Lane, Golborne, Greater Manchester, England
- Coordinates: 53.4912°N 2.5820°W
- Year built: 16th century
- Renovated: 18th and 19th centuries (rebuilt)

Listed Building – Grade II*
- Official name: Lightshaw Hall
- Designated: 15 November 1966
- Reference no.: 1261780

Lightshaw Hall is a Grade II* listed building on Lightshaw Lane in Golborne, a town within the Metropolitan Borough of Wigan, Greater Manchester, England. Historically part of Lancashire, it is a farmhouse that dates from the 16th century and was largely rebuilt in brick during the 18th and 19th centuries. It is now a private residence.

== History ==
Lightshaw Hall originated as a timber-framed farmhouse in the 16th century. It underwent alterations over time and was largely rebuilt in brick during the 18th and 19th centuries. The site is understood to have been moated.

On 15 November 1966, Lightshaw Hall was designated a Grade II* listed building for its architectural and historic significance.

A dendrochronological analysis of timbers from the west (solar) wing of the hall found that seven samples crossmatched to form a tree-ring sequence spanning 1414 to 1552, with one timber retaining its bark edge and dating to the spring of 1553. These results indicate that the solar wing was constructed in the mid-16th century, shortly after the felling of the timbers. Additional samples—a tie-beam and a possible sill beam—produced earlier date ranges (1150 to 1209 and 1106 to 1270), consistent with the reuse of older material and suggesting the presence of an earlier structure on the site.

Lightshaw Hall is currently in use as a private residence and is not open to the public.

== Architecture ==
The building comprises a tall two-storey range, which reflects the form of the original timber-framed structure, alongside a lower two-storey wing that was added later. The brickwork features English garden wall bond and Flemish bond, with most of the masonry dating from the early 19th century. The roof is constructed from graduated stone slates.

Architectural details include casement windows, some of which are mullioned, set with stone sills and flat brick arches. A horizontally sliding sash window is located on the right return, while timber framing is visible externally only in the wall plate and two rear posts. The structure also incorporates a ridge chimney stack.

Internally, Lightshaw Hall retains two Gothic-moulded beams and roof trusses with braced and cusped members. These elements represent surviving examples of early construction techniques within the building.

== Location ==
The hall lies close to Lightshaw Meadows, an area of open countryside comprising wetlands within the Abram Flashes. The landscape developed over many years as a result of mining subsidence, associated with the region's industrial activity. The site covers approximately 44 acres (18 ha), of which 32 acres (13 ha) have been designated as a Site of Special Scientific Interest (SSSI). In recent decades, the condition of the SSSI has been assessed by Natural England as "unfavourable."

In recent years, Community Forest North West and the Lancashire Wildlife Trust have carried out restoration work aimed at returning the site to "favourable" condition and improving habitats for species such as yellow wagtail, lapwing, willow tit, bats, water voles, and various invertebrates.

== See also ==
- Grade II* listed buildings in Greater Manchester
- Listed buildings in Golborne
