= Listed buildings in Golborne =

Golborne is a town in the Metropolitan Borough of Wigan, Greater Manchester, England. The town, the nearby village of Lowton, and the surrounding countryside contain 13 listed buildings that are recorded in the National Heritage List for England. Of these, one is listed at Grade II*, the middle of the three grades, and the others are at Grade II, the lowest grade. The area was largely rural until a cotton mill and a colliery opened in the 19th century. These have closed and the area now contains distribution warehouses. The listed buildings include houses and associated structures, farmhouses, farm buildings, a set of stocks, and two churches.

== Key ==
Grade	Criteria
II*	Particularly important buildings of more than special interest
II	Buildings of national importance and special interest

== Buildings ==
Name and location	Photograph	Date	Notes	Grade
Lightshaw Hall; 53.49120°N 2.58200°W		16th century	A timber framed farmhouse that was largely rebuilt in brick in the 18th and 19th centuries. It has a stone-slate roof, two storeys, three bays, and a lower two-storey wing. Most of the windows are casements, some are mullioned, and in the right return is a horizontally-sliding sash window.	II*
Fair House Farmhouse; 53.47330°N 2.54938°W	—	17th century	The farmhouse is timber framed and rendered, with repairs and extensions in brick, and a slate roof. There are two storeys and five bays, the first bay projecting as a gabled cross-wing. At the rear is a later continuous outshut. The windows are 20th-century replacement casements. Inside is a pair of back-to-back inglenooks and bressumers.	II
Lawson's Farmhouse and wall 53.47012°N 2.59798°W	—	Mid to late 17th century	A brick farmhouse with a plinth on the right return and a slate roof. There are two storeys, a double-depth plan, and a front of two gabled bays. The doorway has a segmental head, the windows on the front are casements with segmental brick arches, and in the left return are horizontally-sliding sash windows. Inside there is an inglenook and a bressumer, and attached to the front of the house is a wall with round coping stones.	II
37 Barn Lane; 53.47518°N 2.60443°W	—	Late 17th century	A house that incorporates earlier material, it was extended and altered in the 19th century. The house consists of a hall and a west wing, with a rear service wing added in the 19th century. The west wing is timber framed, and was clad in brick in the late 17th century. In the front facing the road are horizontally-sliding sash windows, and the other windows are casements.	II
Byrom Hall; 53.48524°N 2.56723°W		1713	A rendered brick house with bands, a modillion eaves cornice and a slate roof. There are three storeys, a double-depth plan, and three bays. The central doorway has a fanlight and a canopy on enriched brackets. The windows are replacement 20th-century casements with stone sills and keystones.	II
St Luke's Church, Lowton; 53.47538°N 2.58046°W		1732	The oldest part of the church is the nave, the transepts date from 1771, alterations were made in 1813, and the chancel probably dates from 1856, the tower from 1862, and a vestry was added in the 20th century. The church is in brick with rusticated quoins, and consists of a nave, north and south transepts, a chancel, and a west tower. The tower has four stages, and contains a round-headed doorway and windows, diagonal buttresses, a clock face, and an embattled parapet. The nave and transepts have round-headed windows with keystones and impost blocks, the south transept has lunette windows, and in the chancel are simple Venetian windows.	II
Town Farmhouse; 53.46994°N 2.59890°W	—	1740	A brick farmhouse with rendered sides, a slate roof, two storeys and three bays. The doorway has a semicircular arch and a recessed brick panel. The windows are casements with cambered brick arches on the ground floor and segmental arches on the upper floor.	II
Stocks; 53.47537°N 2.58082°W	—	1766	The stocks are adjacent to the churchyard wall of St Luke's Church. They consist of two stone posts, tapering towards the top, with Gothic-type moulding. They are grooved and hold timber foot restraints.	II
Ashton Road Farmhouse; 53.48582°N 2.60591°W	—	Late 18th century	A brick farmhouse, rendered on the sides and rear, with a stone-slate roof, it has two storeys, two bays, a one-bay extension to the left, and rear extensions. The central doorway has a flat hood with a datestone above. The windows are casements with stone sills and segmental brick heads.	II
Sundial; 53.47536°N 2.58082°W	—	Late 18th century	The sundial is adjacent to the entrance to the churchyard of St Luke's Church. It is in stone, and consists of a vase-type baluster shaft with a scalloped base, and has a decorative collar including an egg-and-dart band. The dial and gnomon are missing.	II
Holly House; 53.46055°N 2.59155°W	—	c. 1830	A brick house with a pyramidal Welsh slate roof, a double-depth plan, two storeys, and a symmetrical front of three bays. There is a central doorway with engaged Doric columns and a fanlight. The windows on the front are sashes, and at the rear is a round-headed stair window and casement windows.	II
Barn, Town Farm	—	1846		II
St Thomas' Church; 53.47883°N 2.59319°W		1848–51	The church, designed by Joseph Clarke and built in stages, is in stone with a clay tile roof. It consists of a nave, a south aisle, a south porch, a chancel with a north chapel and vestries, and a west tower. The tower has diagonal buttresses, a three-light west window, gabled clock faces, and a pyramidal roof.	II
