= Bamfurlong, Greater Manchester =

Coordinates: 53.508°N 2.608°W

Bamfurlong
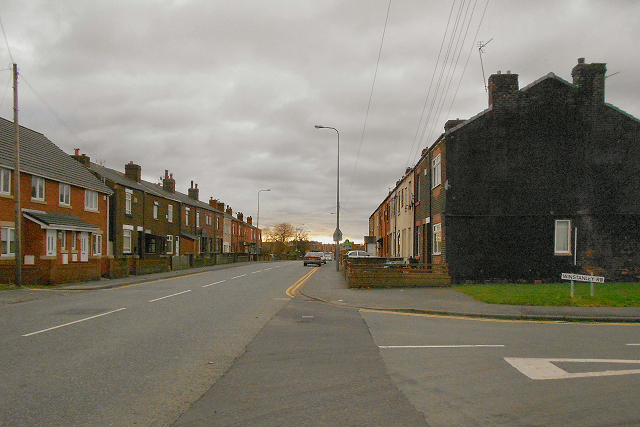
- Lily Lane (A58), Bamfurlong

- Location within Greater Manchester
- OS grid reference: SD596014
- Metropolitan borough: Wigan
- Metropolitan county: Greater Manchester
- Region: North West
- Country: England
- Sovereign state: United Kingdom
- Post town: WIGAN
- Postcode district: WN2
- Dialling code: 01942
- Police: Greater Manchester
- Fire: Greater Manchester
- Ambulance: North West
- UK Parliament: Makerfield

Bamfurlong is a small village in the Metropolitan Borough of Wigan, Greater Manchester, England.

== Location ==
It lies approximately 2.6 miles (4.2 km) south of Wigan town centre and 1.7 miles (2.7 km) to the north east of Ashton-in-Makerfield town centre. Bamfurlong has a population of around 2,500 people.

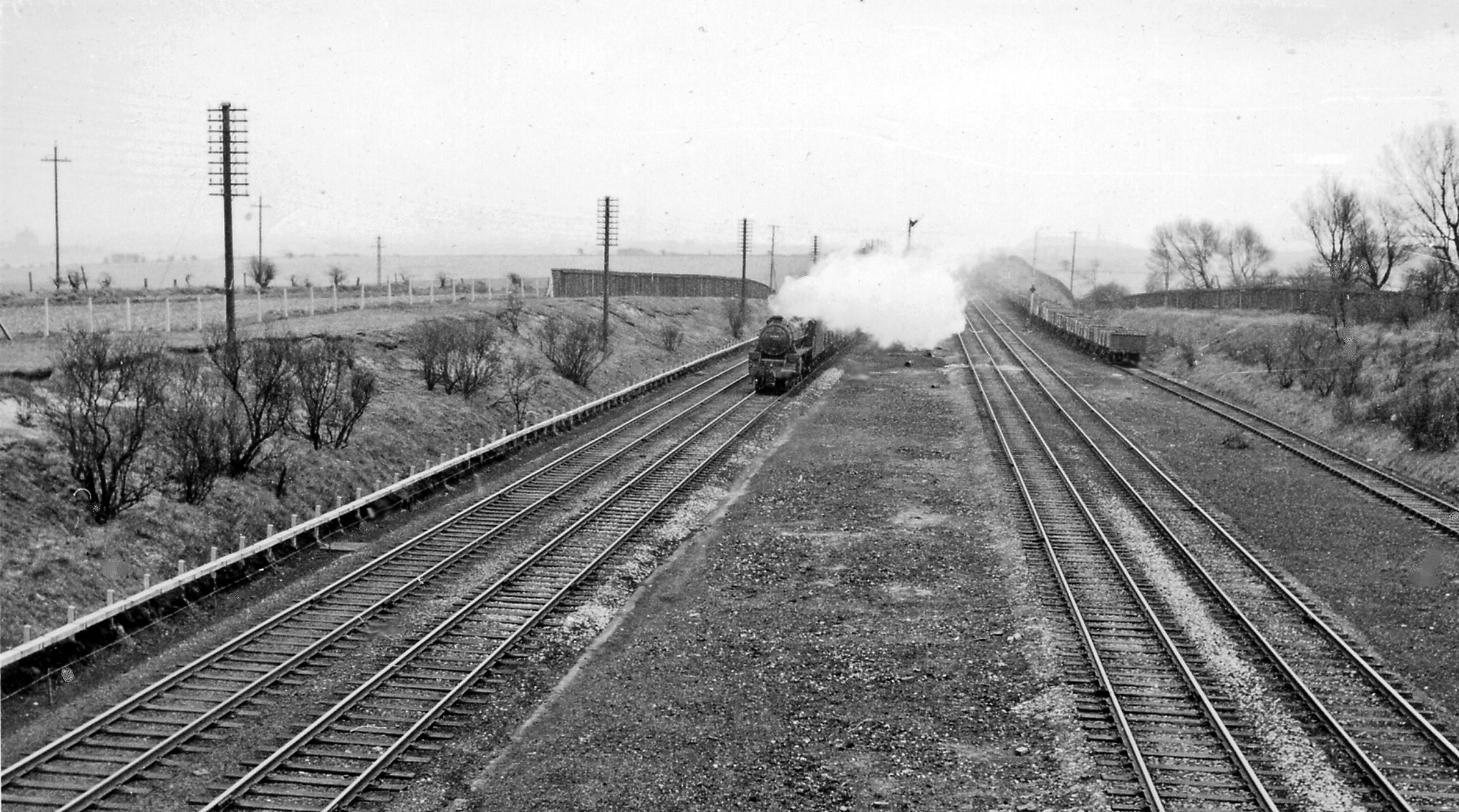
Remains of the station in 1962

Bamfurlong is within the ward of Abram. For transport it is relatively close to the M6 motorway. Bamfurlong railway station served the village from 1832 until closure in 1950.

The proposed High Speed 2 line coming from the south would connect to the West Coast Main Line at the site of the closed station, allowing high-speed services to continue north on slower tracks. No station will be built in the village.
