= Nigel Hart =

English footballer

Personal information
- Date of birth: 1 October 1958 (age 68)
- Place of birth: Golborne, Lancashire, England
- Height: 6 ft 0 in (1.83 m)
- Position: Defender

Youth career
- Stockport County
- 1978–1979: Wigan Athletic

Senior career*
Years	Team	Apps	(Gls)
1979	Wigan Athletic	1	(0)
1979–1981	Leicester City	0	(0)
1981–1982	Blackpool	37	(0)
1982–1987	Crewe Alexandra	142	(10)
1987–1988	Bury	45	(2)
1988–1989	Stockport County	39	(2)
1989–1991	Chesterfield	46	(2)
1991	York City	1	(0)
Total		311	(16)
- * Club domestic league appearances and goals

Nigel Hart (born 1 October 1958) is an English former football defender who played for Wigan Athletic, Leicester City, Blackpool, Crewe Alexandra, Bury, Stockport County, Chesterfield and York City.

== Career ==
Hart started his career on a part-time basis at Stockport County before joining Wigan Athletic in 1978. After spending a season in the reserve team, he made one Football League appearance for the club during the 1979–80 season before moving to Leicester City.

== Personal life ==
Hart is the son of Johnny Hart, who played for and managed Manchester City. His brother, Paul, also played as a defender.
