= North Union Railway =

Early British railway: active from 1834 to 1889

Overview
- Locale: Lancashire
- Dates of operation: 22 May 1834–26 July 1889
- Predecessor: Wigan Branch Railway and Preston and Wigan Railway
- Successor: London and North Western Railway and Lancashire and Yorkshire Railway

Technical
- Track gauge: 4 ft 8 1/2 in (1,435 mm) standard gauge

The North Union Railway was an early British railway company, operating two main routes, from Parkside to Preston and from Bolton Trinity Street to Preston, all in Lancashire. The northerly part of the routes sharing the line from Euxton to Preston.

The company was created in 1834 with the first parliamentary authorised railway amalgamation. The two companies amalgamated were the Wigan Branch Railway (WBR) and the Preston and Wigan Railway (P&WR). In 1844 the company acquired the Bolton and Preston Railway (B&PR).

The company operated independently until 1846, then under joint lease of London and North Western Railway (L&NWR) and Lancashire and Yorkshire Railway (L&YR) but continuing as an independent company until 1889.

In 1889 it was absorbed by the lessees with the line from Parkside to Euxton going to the L&NWR and the line from Euxton to Bolton (the former B&PR) being taken by the L&YR. The section from Euxton to Preston becoming jointly owned.

Most of the line eventually became part of the West Coast Main Line.

== Formation ==
The Wigan Branch Railway obtained an act of Parliament, the Wigan Branch Railway Act 1830 (11 Geo. 4 & 1 Will. 4. c. lvi) on 29 May 1830 to build a line from the Liverpool and Manchester Railway (L&MR) near Parkside to Wigan. The act included a branch to the south of Wigan, the Springs branch, connecting to collieries in the district. (Note: An Act for making and maintaining a Railway from the Borough of Wigan to the Liverpool and Manchester Railway in the Borough of Newton in the County Palatine of Lancaster, and Collateral Branches to communicate therewith.)

The Preston and Wigan Railway (P&WR) had been authorised by the Preston and Wigan Railway Act 1831 (1 Will. 4. c. lvi) in 1831 to construct a railway between Wigan and Preston but was struggling to find sufficient share subscriptions to start construction. (Note: An Act for making and maintaining a Railway from the Borough of Wigan to the Borough of Preston, both in the County Palatine of Lancaster, and collateral Branches to communicate therewith.)

The directors considered abandoning the project but decided that an amalgamation with the WBR would be of benefit to both companies. Within a month the board of the WBR resolved to consolidate with the P&WR.

North Union Railway Act 1834
- Act of Parliament
- Parliament of the United Kingdom
- Long title: An Act for uniting the Wigan Branch Railway Company and the Preston and Wigan Railway Company; for authorizing an Alteration to be made in the Line of the last-mentioned Railway; and for repealing, altering, and amending the Acts relating to the said Railways.
- Citation: 4 & 5 Will. 4. c. xxv

Dates
- Royal assent: 22 May 1834

The North Union Railway (NUR) was created by an act of Parliament, the North Union Railway Act 1834 (4 & 5 Will. 4. c. xxv) on 22 May 1834 which authorised the amalgamation of the Wigan Branch Railway (WBR) and the Preston and Wigan Railway (P&WR), the first-ever parliamentary approved railway amalgamation. (Note: An Act for uniting the Wigan Branch Railway Company and the Preston and Wigan Railway Company; for authorizing an Alteration to be made in the Line of the last-mentioned Railway; and for repealing, altering, and amending the Acts relating to the said Railways.)

When it was created, the North Union Railway consisted of the single-track line constructed by the Wigan Branch Railway from the Liverpool and Manchester Railway (L&MR) at Parkside to Wigan Chapel Lane but little else. The WBR did not own any locomotives or rolling stock, its operations were all supplied under contract by the L&MR.

The construction of the Wigan to Preston section did not start until after the amalgamation and the formation of the NUR.

== Parkside to Wigan 1834-1838 ==
Within a month of the amalgamation the railway appointed Charles Vignoles as engineer on the railway at a salary of £1,200 (equivalent to £135,000 in 2025 (Note: UK Consumer Price Index inflation figures from 1209–2024 based on data from "Inflation calculator", Bank of England, London, 18 February 2026)). His duties were to supervise the building of the 15 miles 30 chains (24.7 km) Wigan to Preston line and oversee the running of the already built 6 miles 47 chains (10.6 km) Parkside to Wigan line. The building and supervision of the Springs branch was not included and became a separate contract. (Note: Railways in the United Kingdom are, for historical reasons, measured in miles and chains. A chain is 22 yards (20 m) long, there are 80 chains to the mile.)

A maintenance contract was let to Smith & Eckersley in May 1835, it was extended for a further two years.

=== Passenger service ===
The L&MR had provided passenger services to the WBR under contract, they continued to provide passenger services for the line under NUR ownership. The service continued as thrice daily each way between Parkside and Wigan. (Note: Dawson (2020) records this as a small engine and one or two coaches, Thomas (1980) has it as one of the older locomotives and four carriages.)

=== Freight service ===
The L&MR had initially provided the WBR with freight services but in 1834 the WBR offered John Hargreaves, an established carrier in the North West, the lease for operating the goods service on their line. Hargreaves, in partnership with his son (also called John Hargreaves) declined the offer and made a counter offer based on the previous years receipts which was accepted by the new North Union Railway, as this was now after the merger of the railways. In July 1835 the son, John Hargreaves junior took over as the sole lessee over the Parkside to Wigan section of the line for all goods traffic with the exception of those who already had the right to operate their own trains, mainly coal mine owners like Richard Evans who operated Edge Green Colliery which was just to the west of the NUR line and connected to it with a standard gauge siding.

The NUR carried Post Office mail to Wigan, the mail being brought to Parkside from Liverpool and Manchester each evening, they were then handed to the guard of the Wigan train who handed them on to a messenger on arrival at Wigan.

== Wigan to Preston construction and opening ==
The construction was undertaken in three contracts which were let in 1835, progress was never as fast as the board would have liked, they blamed much of the delay on Vignoles' frequent absences as he had taken on other work, including in Ireland. One of the contracts had to be re-let at the end of 1836 and a large culvert burst in a flood in November 1837 requiring the building of a 400 feet (120 m) wooden bridge.

The line going north out of Wigan was required by its act of Parliament to cross Wallgate, a major road into Wigan town centre, by a bridge that was "in character architectural and handsome", this required raising the north end of the WBR on a substantial embankment.

As Preston stands upon a ridge rising sharply from the north bank of the River Ribble reaching it involved some engineering, the North Union reached its northern terminus by descending gradients as steep as 1 in 100 into the valley, crossing the river and cutting into the rising ground as far as Fishergate where it built the station. The river bridge was of five arches, each spanning 120 ft. The line was completed in 1838 and a trial run was held on 22 October with a train running from Wigan to Preston, and the line opened to the public on 31 October 1838.

=== Stations ===
The NUR opened the Wigan to Preston section with the following stations:

- Wigan Chapel Lane had been the northern terminus of the Wigan Branch Railway, it was closed on the same day as the opening of the Wigan to Preston section of the railway on 31 October 1838. It was replaced by the slightly further north Wigan station. This station became Wigan North Western on 2 June 1924.
- Boar's Head which was closed on 31 January 1949 (this station later became a joint station with the Lancashire Union Railway).
- Standish Lane, this station probably opened shortly after the line's opening. It was renamed Standish by 1844 and was closed on 23 May 1949.
- Coppull which was closed on 6 October 1969.
- Euxton which was closed on 2 September 1895.
- Golden Hill which was renamed Leyland in 1838 and is still open.
- Farington which was often known as Farrington and closed on 7 March 1960.
- Preston, the northern terminus which is still open.

== Springs branch ==
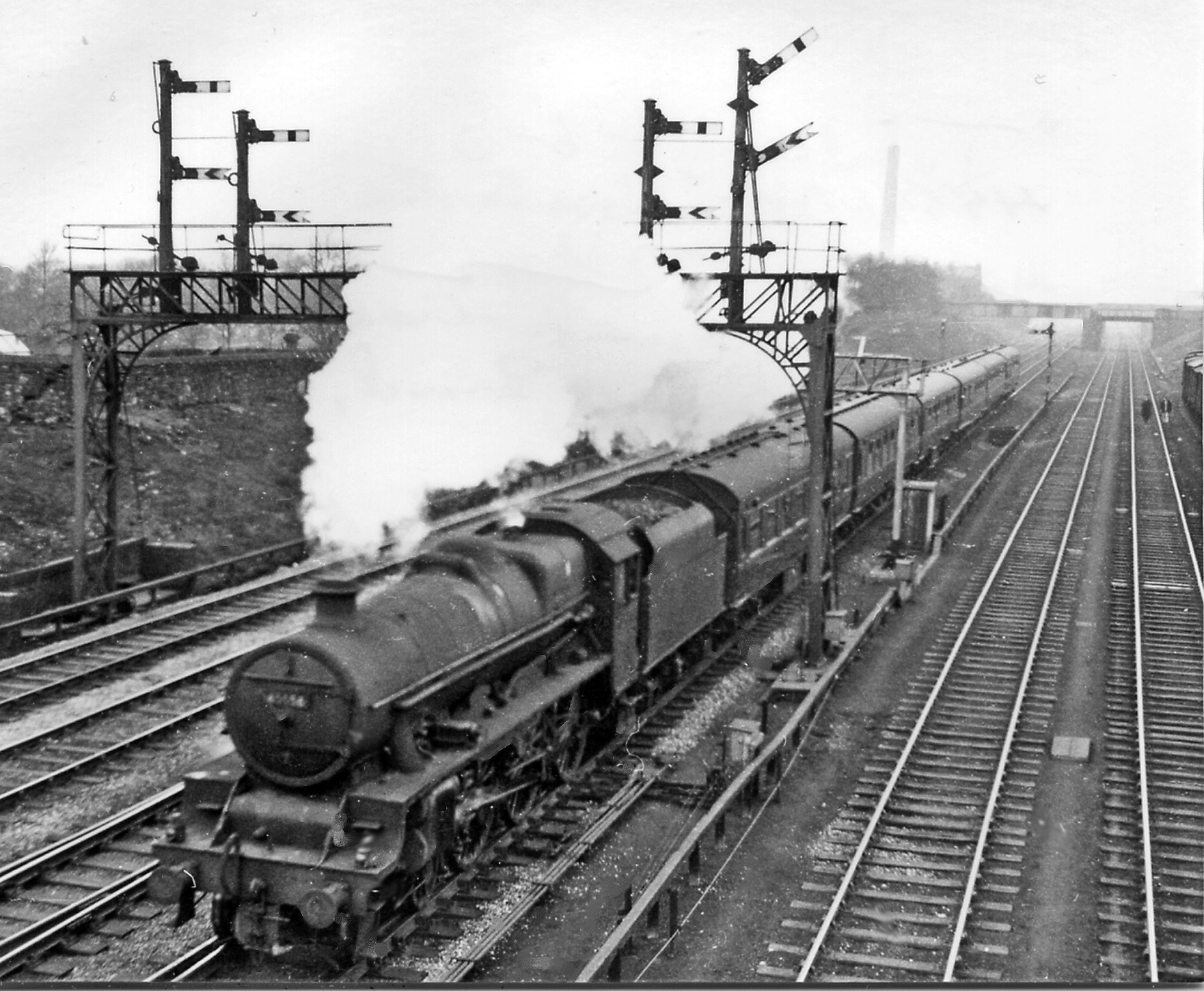
Wigan Springs Branch Junction

The Springs branch branched off the mainline about a mile south of Wigan centre and ran north-east for most of its 2 miles 54 chains (4.3 km) length then turned sharply to run north-west after bridging the Lancaster Canal to the New Springs and Kirkless areas of Wigan. (Note: Railways in the United Kingdom are, for historical reasons, measured in miles and chains. A chain is 22 yards (20 m) long, there are 80 chains to the mile.) The branch was included in the initial plans of the company, and was included in its act of Parliament, it wasn't built immediately for financial reasons. Vignoles was authorised to set out the line in 1836 and it was opened by the North Union Railway as a single track line but with the infrastructure for double track on 31 October 1838, the branch was constructed for freight traffic, especially coal and had no passenger facilities.

The area the branch was to run through had a number of coal mines some of which had been worked for decades, several of them had their own horse-drawn tramways, most of them were connected to either the Lancaster Canal or the Leeds and Liverpool Canal. Wherever the branch cut across these tramways a flat crossing was provided. (Note: Tracing the histories of the collieries in the area is not easy, Townley et al. comments "the pits themselves changed hands frequently...and as a consequence, the railways which served them altered their course just as frequently. To compound the difficulties...most of the firms operating in the district used the words Ince Hall in their title.)

When it opened the branch had connections with several collieries and other industrial concerns, in 1845, when the first Ordnance Survey was conducted there were connections with: (Note: The maps were surveyed between 1845 and 1846 but not published until 1849)

- Springs Colliery, on the east of the branch and connected with a standard gauge siding and opened in 1840. The owners Pearson & Knowles worked their own trains to Preston in the 1840s. There were coke ovens on an adjacent site and it later became an engineering and wagon repair works.
- Ince Hall Coal & Cannel Company Colliery had several pits in the area.
  - Their lower coal works was on the west of the branch alongside a basin on the Leeds and Liverpool Canal near lock 19. This had a standard gauge transfer siding and opened before 1845.
  - The other side of their lower coal works had a narrow gauge tramway running alongside a lengthy arm of the canal to a flat crossing over the branch and onto the north side of Moss Hall Collieries, this tramway was in existence before 1829.
- Moss Hall Collieries were to the east of the branch, as well as the connection above they had a lower narrow gauge connection which ran to lock 17 on the Leeds and Liverpool Canal. There was a transfer siding provided from 1845. (Note: There were several collieries with this name in existence at this time with a variety of owners, some in partnership, others not.)
- New Hall Colliery was to the east of the branch and connected via a narrow gauge tramway.
- New Hall Mill was to the west of the branch and connected via a narrow gauge tramway and a standard gauge siding.
- Barton's Kirkless Colliery was mainly to the west of the branch with at least one pit well the east, they were connected together and to the branch by standard gauge sidings.
- Thicknesse's Kirkless Colliery was to the north of the branch after the branch had crossed the Lancaster Canal, there was some overlap with Barton's Collieries in the area but Barton mined mostly deeper workings and Thicknesse the shallower ones, Thicknesse had a narrow gauge tramway connecting to a transfer siding on the branch.
- The Earl of Crawford and Balcarres owned mines in the Haigh and Aspull areas of Wigan. He had two Moor Pits and Wall Hey Pit that were connected together and to the branch at an end-on connection.

The branch was doubled in 1845 except for a short section where it crossed the canal spur. (Note: This short spur known as the Lancaster Canal extension was built in 1835/6 apparently mainly to inconvenience the building of the branch.)

== Other colliery connections ==
- Ince Hall Colliery, later known as Crow Orchard Colliery, had a connection to the main NUR line just north of the Springs branch. The owner, Thomas Pearson, ran his own coal trains from the early 1840s.
- Amberswood colliery originally had a connection to the NUR mainline south of Springs branch junction, this line was removed in the early 1860s when it was replaced by a connection at Fir Tree House Sidings, close to the end of the L&NWR's Eccles, Tyldesley and Wigan line. The owner, Richard Hollinshead Blundell, ran his own coal trains to Preston from the early 1840s. Blundell was authorised to run his own trains over the L&MR to Liverpool and later agreed to carry some of the Earl of Crawford's coal when the L&MR refused him permission to run his own. Blundell also ran trains over the Grand Junction Railway working coal to Winsford from 1844.

== 1838 to 1844 ==
By 1838 the Parkside to Wigan section of the railway had been double-tracked, a new Parkside station opened on 31 October 1838, providing improved connections with the Liverpool and Manchester Railway, it was east of the original station and situated at the junction with the L&MR. It was constructed jointly by the L&MR, Grand Junction Railway and NUR. The former station became a goods station on the L&MR.

Golborne was opened between Parkside and Wigan North Western as Golborne Gate or Gates by the NUR probably sometime before 1839 as the station started to appear on the maps in Bradshaw from then, fares to intermediate stations, including Golbourne Gate [sic] were published in 1839. (Note: Gate according to Quick (2022), but labelled Gates in Bradshaw (1839 - 1844))

== Bolton to Preston ==
The North Union Railway was concerned to protect its interests and had many disagreements with rival railways and canals. The North Union Railway opposed the proposed Bolton and Preston Railway (B&PR), whose original act of Parliament, the Bolton and Preston Railway Act 1837 (7 Will. 4 & 1 Vict. c. cxxi), of 15 July 1837 made for an independent route through to Preston. A further act of Parliament, the Bolton and Preston Railway Company Act 1838 (1 & 2 Vict. c. lvi), of 4 July 1838 was enacted withdrawing the B&PR's powers to build beyond Chorley and instead authorised an extension to join the North Union Railway's line at Euxton, north of Chorley.

The Bolton and Preston Railway Act 1837 was passed with the proviso that the line north of Chorley should be delayed for three years so that a compromise could be reached between the two companies about running trains into Preston. Section 17 of the Bolton and Preston Railway Company Act 1838 removed this restriction.

When the first section of the Bolton to Preston line opened on 4 February 1841 it met the Manchester, Bolton and Bury Railway (MB&BR) coming up from Salford which had opened on 29 May 1838. This railway was built by the Manchester, Bolton and Bury Canal Navigation and Railway Company who had in 1831 converted from a canal company. Their railway terminated at Bolton Trinity Street station and part of the enabling act of Parliament for the Preston to Bolton section made provision for the station to be converted to a through station to allow for traffic to Preston.

In the same way as the L&MR provided operational services to the WBR and NUR over the Parkside to Wigan section, so the MB&BR provided operational services to the NUR over the Bolton to Preston Section.

There was immediate competition between the two companies for the Manchester to Preston traffic and they tried to undercut each other's fares. The North Union managed to maintain the upper hand in the competition as they were able to extract tolls from its rival for running trains along its Euxton to Preston stretch.

The rivalry was short-lived as the Bolton and Preston Railway was acquired by the North Union Railway by the Bolton and Preston Railway Act 1844 (7 & 8 Vict. c. ii) of 10 May 1844. (Note: An Act to effectuate the Sale by the Bolton and Preston Railway Company of their Railway and other Property and Effects to the North Union Railway Company; to incorporate with such last-mentioned Company the Proprietors of the Bolton and Preston Railway; and to consolidate Shares into Stock.)

== Operations 1844—1889 ==
In 1846 arrangements were authorised by the North Union Railways Purchase Act 1846 (9 & 10 Vict. c. ccxxxi) for the line to be leased jointly to the Grand Junction Railway (GJR) and the Manchester and Leeds Railway (M&LR) but before this happened the GJR became part of the London and North Western Railway (L&NWR), the arrangement continued however with the L&NWR and the M&LR jointly leasing the NUR.

On 9 July 1847 the Manchester and Leeds Railway changed its title to the Lancashire and Yorkshire Railway (L&YR) but the leasing arrangement continued.

North Union and Ribble Navigation Branch Railway Act 1845
- Act of Parliament
- Parliament of the United Kingdom
- Long title: An Act for enabling the North Union Railway Company and the Ribble Navigation Company to make a Branch or Connexion Railway from the North Union Railway to the Victoria Quay in Preston; and for amending and enlarging the Powers and Provisions of the several Acts relating to such Railway and Navigation respectively.
- Citation: 8 & 9 Vict. c. cxvi

Dates
- Royal assent: 21 July 1845

In 1845, in conjunction with the Ribble Navigation Company, the North Union obtained powers in the North Union and Ribble Navigation Branch Railway Act 1845 (8 & 9 Vict. c. cxvi) to build a branch to Victoria Quay on the River Ribble. This line was built to convey coal from the Wigan district to the river for shipment. (Note: An Act for enabling the North Union Railway Company and the Ribble Navigation Company to make a Branch or Connexion Railway from the North Union Railway to the Victoria Quay in Preston; and for amending and enlarging the Powers and Provisions of the several Acts relating to such Railway and Navigation respectively.)

Parkside west curve opened in 1847 by the L&NWR under powers obtained by the GJR. Preston Junction was opened by the L&NWR in 1849 at the junction of the two curves from the former L&MR line.

Winwick cut-off opened in 1864 which provided a straight route between Warrington Bank Quay and Wigan North Western saving express trains 24 minutes along that stretch.

Bamfurlong station was opened on 1 April 1878 by the L&NWR and closed on 27 November 1950.

The NUR continued independently under this leasing arrangement with the L&NWR owning 60/94th and the L&YR 34/94th. This was the situation until 26 July 1889 when it was jointly absorbed by the L&NWR and L&YR under the terms of the London and North Western Railway Act 1889 (52 & 53 Vict. c. xcviii). (Note: An Act for conferring further Powers upon the London and North-Western Railway Company in relation to their own Undertaking and other Undertakings in which they are interested jointly with other Companies and also for conferring powers upon the North London Railway Company and other Railway Companies in relation to such other Undertakings for vesting portions of the North Union Railway in the Company and the Lancashire and Yorkshire Railway Company respectively and for other purposes.)

The NUR was absorbed by the two larger companies by the simple expedient of the section from Euxton to Bolton (the former B&PR) being taken by the L&YR and the section from Parkside to Euxton going to the L&NWR. The section from Euxton to Preston and Preston remained in joint ownership.

== Management ==
The first chairman of the company was Sir Thomas Dalrymple Hesketh, Bart. He had previously held the same position at the Preston and Wigan Railway. The board had active and powerful members in T. W. Rathbone, and Hardman Earle, who were also on the boards of L&MR and GJR.

== After dissolution ==
To cope with ever-increasing traffic, the line was quadrupled between 1889 and 1891.

The stretch between Euxton Junction and Preston, which included the major part of Preston station, remained in joint ownership up to 1921 when the L&YR was absorbed by the L&NWR so from that date the former North Union Railway had only one owner. This section of the West Coast Main Line between London Euston and Carlisle had been the only part not wholly owned by the L&NWR.

Balshaw Lane and Euxton station was opened by the L&NWR on 2 September 1905, it closed on 6 October 1969. Services restarted from this station now named Euxton Balshaw Lane on 15 December 1997.

== Accidents and incidents ==
- In November 1832 a locomotive from Evans' collieries at Edge Green collided head-on with a WBR passenger service on its way to Wigan at Parkside.
- A Pearson & Knowles locomotive ASA collided with a stage coach on a level crossing at Euxton on 7 September 1841.
- In February 1844 a coal train operated by Henry Blundell ran into the back of a Pearson & Knowles coal train near Coppull killing the brakesman.
- On 28 June 1847, the boiler of a locomotive exploded, injuring one person.
- On 17 October 1850 a Pearson & Knowles locomotive LIVER was involved in an unspecified accident near Boars Head.
