= Newton-le-Willows railway station =

Railway station in Newton-le-Willows, Merseyside

Newton-le-Willows
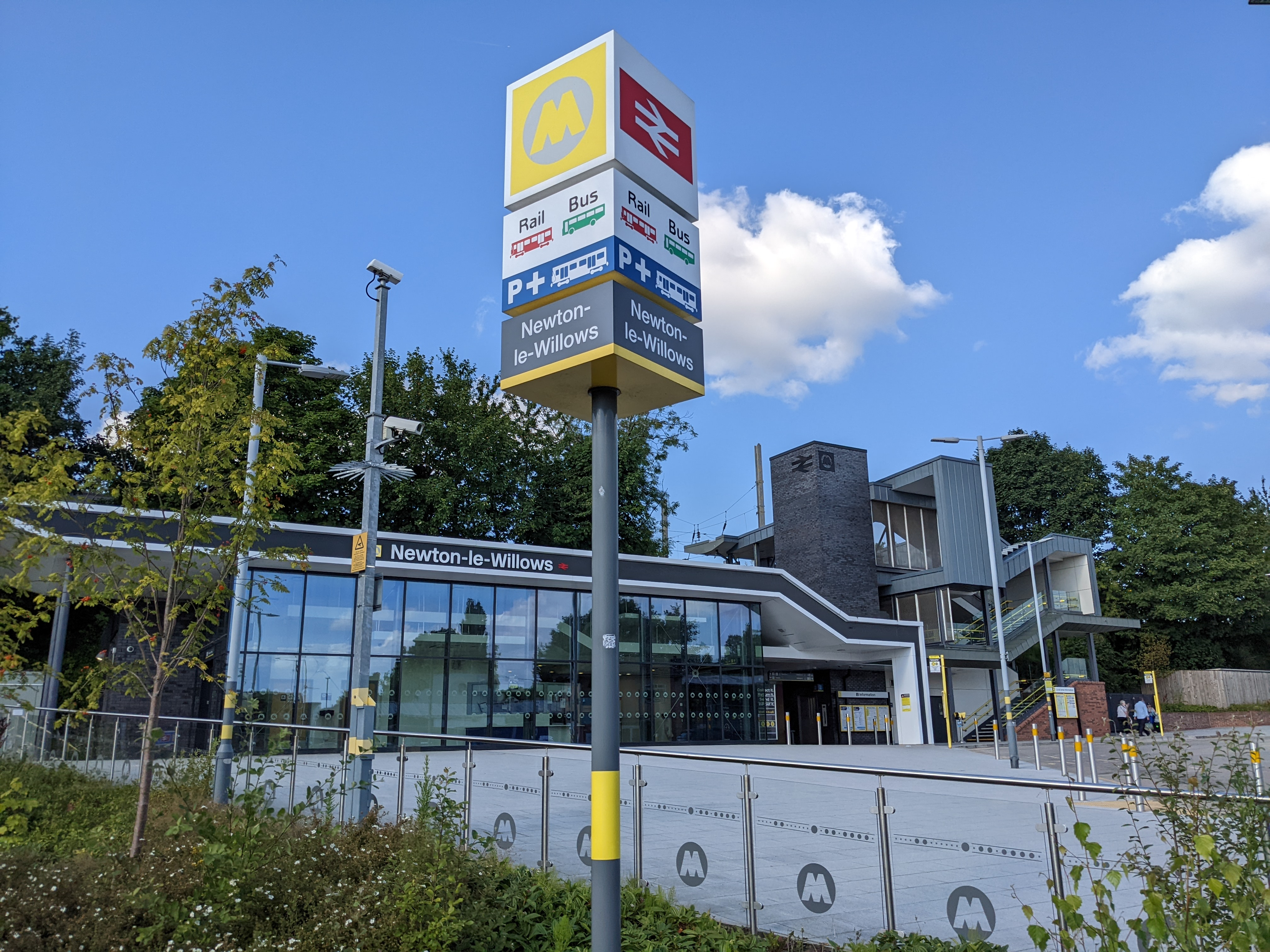
- Newton-le-Willows railway station

General information
- Location: Newton-le-Willows, St Helens; England
- Coordinates: 53.453°N 2.614°W
- Grid reference: SJ593953
- Managed by: Northern Trains
- Transit authority: Merseytravel
- Platforms: 2

Other information
- Station code: NLW
- Fare zone: A1
- Classification: DfT category E

History
- Original company: London and North Western Railway
- Pre-grouping: London and North Western Railway
- Post-grouping: London, Midland and Scottish Railway

Key dates
- 1830: Opened as Newton Bridge
- 1888: Renamed Newton-le-Willows

Passengers
- 2020/21: ▼0.213 million
- Interchange: ▼38,835
- 2021/22: ▲0.791 million
- Interchange: ▲0.136 million
- 2022/23: ▲0.799 million
- Interchange: ▲0.303 million
- 2023/24: ▲0.910 million
- Interchange: ▲0.325 million
- 2024/25: ▲1.107 million
- Interchange: ▲0.363 million
Location
Notes
- Passenger statistics from the Office of Rail and Road

Newton-le-Willows railway station is a railway station in the town of Newton-le-Willows, in the Metropolitan Borough of St Helens, and at the edge of the Merseytravel region (16 1/4 miles (26.2 km) from Liverpool Lime Street). The station is branded Merseyrail. The station is situated on the northern route of the Liverpool to Manchester Line, the former Liverpool and Manchester Railway which opened in 1830. It is a busy feeder station for nearby towns which no longer have railway stations, such as Golborne, Billinge and Haydock. There is also a complimentary bus shuttle service to Haydock Park Racecourse on certain racedays.

== History ==
The station was built in 1830 and originally named Newton Bridge. It was renamed Newton-le-Willows on 14 June 1888.

Later, it was also on the main LNWR line from London to Preston and Scotland (what is now the West Coast Main Line) thanks to a number of company mergers and acquisitions – the former North Union Railway's branch from Parkside Junction (east of the new station) to Wigan North Western had opened back in 1832 and the completion of a north to west curve round to Lowton on 1 January 1847 by the Grand Junction Railway had allowed through running to commence from London Euston and Birmingham New Street via the original Newton Junction (the modern day Earlestown), then over the L&M and onwards to Wigan and the north from that date. Within three years however, the heavily congested section of the L&M through the station was bypassed for north–south traffic with the opening of a cut-off line from Winwick Junction to Golborne, though local stopping trains between Warrington Bank Quay and Wigan continued to call thereafter. The station was also well served by trains between Manchester Exchange and Liverpool Lime Street (many of which were routed via Leigh) and also to Chester General via Warrington and the Birkenhead Joint Railway. The connections to the WCML also provided a useful diversionary route for trains to Preston and beyond from both Manchester and Liverpool – these were utilised by British Rail when they set up a Motorail terminal at the station in the 1960s, which offered through trains to Stirling and Inverness and to St Austell.

The station avoided the Beeching Axe in the 1960s, though the Warrington to Wigan local trains along the WCML ended in 1969 along with services via Leigh. The Motorail terminal closed in the early 1980s as British Rail cut back the number of routes on offer across the network, though the sidings into it were not finally removed until August 2013.

== Redevelopment ==
Merseytravel put forward proposals in December 2015 for the station to be developed as an interchange station. The proposals were later approved with the work scheduled to be completed by March 2018.

Work on the new facilities started on 28 November 2016 and included:

- New South side entrance
- New ticket office at south entrance
- Bus Interchange adjacent to the new ticket office
- 400+ space car park (including blue badge and wider spaces)
- Electric vehicle charging points
- New toilet facilities
- Improved passenger waiting facilities
- Step free access to and between the platforms via a new subway and lifts
- Increased cycle parking
- Dedicated drop off and pick up area
- Local highways improvements

Following some delays, the work was completed and the redeveloped station officially opened on Sunday 13 January 2019.

== Electrification ==
The line through the station was electrified by British Rail in 1973 as part of the West Coast Main Line electrification scheme, and the station was served by electrically hauled mail trains, but no regularly scheduled electric passenger trains called here. This finally changed over forty years later when the Liverpool to Manchester line via Chat Moss was electrified by Network Rail as part of the North West Electrification Programme. Commuter services which call at Newton-le-Willows were operated by four car Class 319 electric multiple units from March 2015 until 2024 when they were replaced with Class 331. 3-car Class 323 units also services.

== Facilities ==
Like most Merseytravel stations, it is staffed from start of service until the last train has left (closing just before midnight each evening). There are also self-service ticket machines provided. There are shelters on both platforms, along with digital information screens and timetable poster boards. On the south side of the station there is also a bus interchange with buses to a few local destinations and a large free car park.

== Services ==
The May 2018 timetable change has seen a major upgrade of services here. TransPennine Express now operate an hourly fast Liverpool to Newcastle via Manchester Victoria, Leeds and York that calls here (introduced as part of the new TPE franchise agreement), whilst Northern's service between Liverpool and Manchester Airport calls at all intermediate stations between Liverpool and the Airport (it no longer runs through to Crewe since the winter 2022 timetable change). At peak times there is also a limited local service to Manchester Victoria and a single evening train to Wigan North Western via the Parkside West curve (a balancing service from there runs in the morning).

Transport for Wales also serves the station once per hour each way (with peak extras) on its Manchester Airport/Manchester Piccadilly to Chester and Llandudno route, though a few trains run to and from Holyhead (to connect with the ferry to Ireland).

On Sundays the service frequency remains the same on all routes, though TfW trains only run to and from Chester. East Midlands Railway services between Liverpool and Nottingham/Norwich services sometimes call here if their usual route via Warrington Central is closed for engineering work, with Warrington-bound passengers changing here for a rail-replacement bus connection.

The new "Northern Connect" services from Chester to Leeds via Manchester Victoria and Bradford Interchange also stops at Newton-le-Willows following its introduction in May 2019. This runs hourly each way Mondays to Saturdays and also on a Sunday since the spring 2023 timetable change

Northern rail opened up a consultation on proposed services which would operate through Newton-le-Willows from December 2022 which reduces the volume of services to and from Manchester Piccadilly, and increased service to Manchester Victoria.

Preceding station	National Rail	Following station
Liverpool Lime Street	TransPennine Express; North TransPennine	Manchester Victoria
Earlestown	Northern Trains; Chester–Leeds	Manchester Victoria
Earlestown	Northern Trains; Liverpool to Manchester Line	Patricroft
Earlestown	Transport for Wales; Chester to Manchester Line	Manchester Oxford Road
	Historical railways	
Earlestown; Line and station open	London and North Western Railway	Lowton; Line open, station closed
Earlestown; Line and station open	London and North Western Railway	Parkside; Line open, station closed

== See also ==
- Listed buildings in St Helens, Merseyside
