= Wigan Chapel Lane railway station =

Early British railway station

Wigan Chapel Lane

General information
- Location: Wigan; England
- Coordinates: 53.5418°N 2.6300°W
- Grid reference: SD583052

Other information
- Status: Disused

History
- Original company: Wigan Branch Railway

Key dates
- 3 September 1832: Opened
- 31 October 1838: Closed
Location

Wigan Chapel Lane railway station served the town of Wigan in Lancashire, England.

== Wigan Branch Railway ==
The station opened as Wigan on 3 September 1832 as the terminus of the Wigan Branch Railway (WBR) when it opened the 6 miles 47 chains (10.6 km) long line from Parkside on the Liverpool and Manchester Railway. (Note: Railways in the United Kingdom are, for historical reasons, measured in miles and chains. A chain is 22 yards (20 m) long, there are 80 chains to the mile.)

The station building was located to the south of the running line adjacent to Chapel Lane, no other details are known. The station was only known as Wigan and Chapel Lane was added in an explanatory way as to the location of the Railway's office.

The station was short-lived as the line was extended northwards to Preston in 1838 necessitated taking it over Wallgate, the turnpike to Warrington, which required the building of substantial embankments, a new station, Wigan North Western was constructed to the south of this new bridge over Wallgate.

== Goods station ==
After closure in 1838 the station site became Wigan goods station. The goods station and yard gradually expanded until there were three sheds, it was able to accommodate most types of goods including live stock, and was equipped with a ten-ton crane. Sometime between 1938 and 1956 the yard lost its capacity to deal with livestock and its crane was downgraded to one of four tons.

The goods yard was still in use in 1957 but by 2008 the goods sheds had been demolished and the goods yard site was occupied by a retail warehouse and car park.
