= Golborne =

Town in Greater Manchester, England

Coordinates: 53.4758°N 2.5943°W

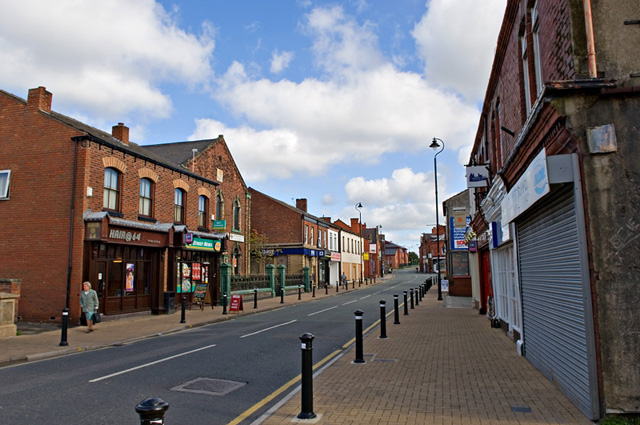
- High Street, Golborne

- Location within Greater Manchester
- Population: 24,169 (2011 census)
- OS grid reference: SJ606978
- Metropolitan borough: Wigan
- Metropolitan county: Greater Manchester
- Region: North West
- Country: England
- Sovereign state: United Kingdom
- Post town: WARRINGTON
- Postcode district: WA3
- Dialling code: 01925; 01942
- Police: Greater Manchester
- Fire: Greater Manchester
- Ambulance: North West
- UK Parliament: Leigh and Atherton

Golborne (pronounced /ˈɡoʊlbɔːrn/ GOHL-born) is a town in the Metropolitan Borough of Wigan, in Greater Manchester, England. It lies 5 miles (8.0 km) south-south-east of Wigan, 6 miles (9.7 km) north-east of Warrington and 14 miles (22.5 km) to the west of the city of Manchester. Along with the neighbouring village of Lowton, it recorded a population of 24,041.

Within the boundaries of the historic county of Lancashire and being situated across the A580 East Lancashire Road, Golborne owed most of its historic growth to mining and textile manufacturing; however, these industries have since declined. There was also significant agricultural activity, with many farms still belonging to the families who originally owned them.

== History ==
=== Toponymy ===
The name Golborne derives from the Old English golde and burna, meaning "stream where marsh marigolds grow". The earliest settlements in the present-day town were on banks of the Millingford Brook, hence its name being derived from a water course where calendula grew. Golborne has been recorded in ancient documents as Goldeburn in 1187, Goldburc in 1201, Goseburn and Goldburn in 1212 and Golburne in 1242. Golborne and Gowborne were 16th-century spellings.

=== Early history ===
A settlement at Golborne has existed since at least the time of the Domesday Book of 1086. The manor was held in two moieties, half by the Lords of Lowton, and the half by the Golbornes up to the reign of Henry III, and later by various families including the Fleetwoods and Leghs.

The old Manor of Golborne stood to the north side of the village, giving its name to a public house on Church Street (now demolished). The manor and its lands extended as far as St Luke's Church in Lowton, and also gives its name to Manor Avenue and Manor Court.

The Venerable Bede wrote in his Historia ecclesiastica gentis Anglorum of a well near Golborne sacred to St. Oswald's memory. This well had been suggested as the site where Penda, the pagan king of Mercia, slew the Christian King Oswald, later St Oswald, in the Battle of Maserfield, in 642. It is more generally accepted though that the site of that battle was some considerable distance to the southwest, near Oswestry.

Holcroft Hall, now a farm, was the home of Colonel Blood who, during the reign of Charles II, attempted to steal the Crown Jewels. King Charles was amused by Blood's audacity and pardoned him. Blood married Maria Holcroft of Holcroft Hall at Newhurch Church against the will of her father.

In 1648, the Battle of Red Gap was fought by the old road south from Golborne (probably the Red Bank area of Newton le Willows) during the 2nd Civil War. The Scots, on the side of Charles I, had advanced into England. Oliver Cromwell, leader of the Roundhead Army, intercepted the Scots at Preston; in a series of running battles between Preston, Wigan and Warrington, of which Red Gap was one, he defeated the Scots even though his army was outnumbered by ten to one.

=== Recent history ===
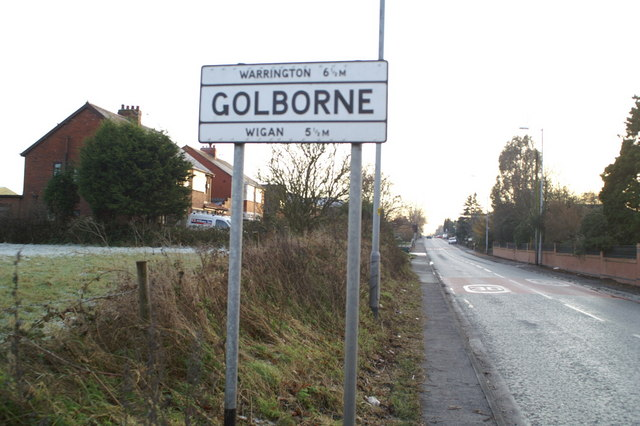
Boundary sign on Wigan Road (A573)

The former village grew rapidly during the Industrial Revolution as the mining industry expanded. On 18 March 1979, there was a methane explosion at the town's colliery caused by an electrical spark, which took the lives of ten miners. Of the eleven present, only one survived. The colliery closed in 1989. The location of the former colliery is known locally as the Bonk, which is now the largest park in Golborne. (Note: The name is said to have originated from the migration of Welsh miners to North West coal mines: 'bonk' may derive from the Welsh word "banc", meaning bank or mound, for the spoil tip of the colliery; possibly also involving a Lancashire dialect vowel mutation of 'a' to 'o'.)

The closure of the colliery led to the loss of employment for a large proportion of Golborne's population, as well as people from nearby towns and villages such as Abram, Lowton and Ashton-in-Makerfield. Unemployment problems have been mostly eradicated in recent years with the development of different industries which has brought in new jobs, further aided by the creation of Stone Cross Industrial Park and Golborne Enterprise Park.

== Governance ==
Under the Local Government Act 1972, in force from 1 April 1974, the urban district of Golborne, established in 1894 (and expanded in 1933 by adding part of Leigh Rural District which included Kenyon), was split, with the parts of Culcheth and Newchurch becoming the civil parish of Culcheth and Glazebury in the Warrington district in Cheshire, and the rest of the district becoming part of the Metropolitan Borough of Wigan of Greater Manchester.

== Demography ==
Population growth in Golborne since 1901
Year	1901	1911	1921	1931	1939	1951	1961	2001
Population	6,789	6,931	7,183	7,321	13,845	16,878	21,310	20,007
Source: A Vision of Britain through Time

== Landmarks ==
The parish church of Golborne is St Thomas' Church, in the Deanery of Winwick, Diocese of Liverpool. Founded in 1829, the church building has a clock tower that is still in operation and is still heard chiming on every hour. There is also a graveyard surrounding the building.

Peter Kane Square and memorial clock is situated in the town centre and is named in honour of local boxer Peter Kane.

On Sunday 19 March 2006 the Rector of Golborne, the Rev Robert Williams, officiated at a service in Kidglove Road at what was the entrance to Golborne Colliery. The service was attended by ex-miners and their families, and was the fruition of two years of fund-raising to erect the 6-by-3-foot (1.83 m × 0.91 m) stone, commissioned in memory of the men and women who worked and died at Golborne Colliery between its opening in 1880 and its closure in 1989.

The memorial was conceptualised by the Golborne Ex-Miners Association, who staged a series of concerts to help towards the cost of the stone. Funding was also received from a community chest grant from Wigan Metropolitan Borough Council, Alpla (UK) Ltd of Golborne, and the Coal Industry Social Welfare Organisation. Former miner Dean Mitchell landscaped the memorial site.

A cenotaph memorial also lies at the junction of Legh Street and Barn Lane.

== Transport ==
Golborne lies on the West Coast Main Line, one of the busiest rail lines in the UK, but no longer has a railway station on it; the nearest are at Newton-le-Willows for regional services connecting Liverpool, Manchester, Chester and North Wales, and Wigan North Western and Warrington Bank Quay for Avanti West Coast inter-city services between Glasgow Central, Edinburgh Waverley and London Euston.

There is a campaign to reopen the town's main line railway station, Golborne South. As part of Greater Manchester's Transport Initiative Fund package, a station at Golborne would be reinstated, probably on the site of the original station off the A573 in the centre of town. Golborne's branch line station, Golborne North, was closed in 1952. If it were to be reopened, hourly services between Wigan and Stalybridge would run. It would also be the first Bee Network train station in Manchester. Work will be starting in late January 2026 to remove parts of the greenery and trees to make way for the construction of the station. This work will end in March 2026. The Mayor of Greater Manchester, Andy Burnham, commented that “Golborne has a rock solid case for a station. It is now becoming quite clear. It has been sent to the Government for sign off. I prioritised it as mayor because of the very poor transport connectivity in that area – and if Metrolink isn’t coming anytime soon to the Wigan borough then it has to be the case to improve rail connectivity.

Bus services in Golborne are run by three operators – - the Bee Network who provide services to Leigh, Wigand and Platt Bridge; Arriva Merseyside provide services to Wigan, Warrington and Newton-le-Willows; Warrington's Own Buses who run a service to Wigan, Warrington Interchange, Newton-le-Willows and Earlestown.

== Notable people ==
- Brian Simpson (born 1953), politician, Member of the European Parliament, 1989–2014
- Philip McGinley (born 1981), actor, played Anguy the Archer in Game of Thrones season 3
- Natasha Hodgson (born 1986), actress, singer and writer; co-created and performed the musical Operation Mincemeat
- Chris Washington (born 1989), postman for eleven years, then comedian

=== Sport ===
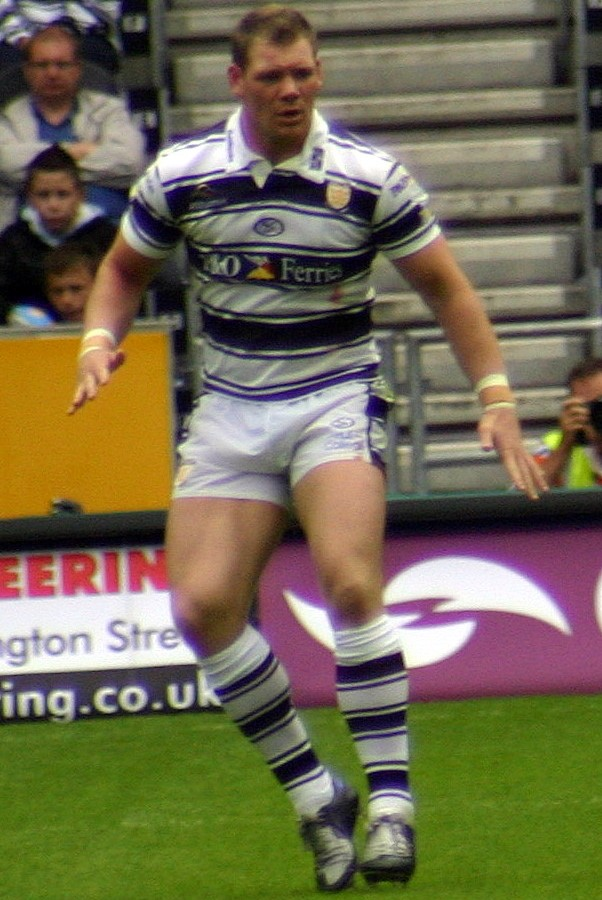
Danny Tickle, 2008

- Billy Hibbert (1884–1949), footballer, played 443 games, starting with 178 for Bury
- Peter Kane (1918–1991), blacksmith, then a world champion flyweight boxer in the 1930s.
- Johnny Hart (1928-2018), footballer, played 169 games with Manchester City then a football manager
- Fred Else (1933–2015), football goalkeeper who played 607 games including 238 for Preston North End & 221 for Blackburn Rovers
- Bert Llewellyn (1939–2016), footballer, played 327 games, ending with 115 with Wigan Athletic
- Jimmy Pennington (born 1939), footballer, played 161 games
- Paul Hart (born 1953), footballer, played 567 games, including 191 for Leeds United & 143 for Blackpool
- Nigel Hart (born 1958), football defender who played 311 games including 142 for Crewe Alexandra
- Thomas Billington (1958–2018), professional wrestler; known as the Dynamite Kid
- Davey Boy Smith (1962–2002), professional wrestler, cousin of Thomas Billington
- Danny Tickle, (born 1983), rugby league player, played 507 games, including 177 at Hull & 141 at Wigan Warriors
- Matty Hughes (born 1992), footballer, played over 270 games
- Andy Ackers (born 1993), rugby league footballer who has played 268 games
- Charlie Hughes (born 2003), footballer, played nearly 100 games

== See also ==
- Listed buildings in Golborne
- List of mining disasters in Lancashire
