= Wigan Branch Railway =

Early British railway: active from 1830 to 1834

Overview
- Locale: Lancashire
- Dates of operation: 29 May 1830–22 May 1834
- Successors: North Union Railway; London and North Western Railway; London, Midland and Scottish Railway; London Midland Region of British Railways

Technical
- Track gauge: 4 ft 8 1/2 in (1,435 mm) standard gauge

The Wigan Branch Railway was a short-lived early British railway company, formed in 1830 and operating from 1832 to 1834 in Lancashire. It was constructed to link Wigan and the surrounding coalfield to the Liverpool and Manchester Railway (L&MR). It was involved in the first parliamentary approved amalgamation of railways to become part of the North Union Railway. Most of the line eventually became part of the West Coast Main Line (WCML).

== Background ==
Wigan was situated on the Leeds and Liverpool Canal which ran to Liverpool on the west coast, to Yorkshire across the Pennines, and to the east a branch ran to Leigh where it made a connection with the Bridgewater Canal linking it with the rest of the canal network and in particular Manchester.

The canals of the time were the major freight routes being faster and able to transport greater loads than the carriers using the turnpike road system. But, unfortunately, these canal routes were slow, becoming congested, and increasingly more expensive as demand from the rapidly expanding businesses in the area increased. The waterways had a virtual monopoly on the transport links which enabled them to charge exorbitant tolls. Even with the demand the canals were not always able to provide the desired service, for example in February 1830 there was a severe frost which closed them and coal had to be carted into Liverpool at nearly twice the cost.

The area around Wigan had seen a stimulus in trade, and especially in coal mining, since the opening of the Leeds and Liverpool Canal in 1816. By the late 1820s local businesses considered themselves disadvantaged by the canal monopoly on transport, local newspapers reported the proposed railway as being shorter to both Liverpool and Manchester and should counteract the injurious influence of the charges to use the canal.

They looked to the railway to break this monopoly, the canal companies recognised this threat to their business early on, for example, the Leeds and Liverpool canal company minutes of 21 September 1822 mention the issue, and the canal businesses started to take steps to protect their interests.

Rail roads, tramroads and railways had been around for some time, mainly used to transport goods, especially coal to the canal network. There was already at least one private railway operating in the area, in 1812 Robert Daglish had constructed a railway to carry coal from Orrell Colliery in Winstanley, near Wigan to the Leeds and Liverpool Canal, this railway used "Blenkinsop and Murrays" patent cog and rack steam locomotives to haul the coal wagons. A little further north the Lancaster Canal had been built in two sections joined in 1797 by a five mile long tramroad.

The railway as planned was 13 miles shorter than the canal route to Liverpool, and one mile shorter to Manchester. There was only one level crossing on the line, at Golborne Gates where the Warrington to Wigan turnpike crossed the railway.

== Formation to 1834 ==
=== Establishment ===
Preliminary surveys had been completed in 1829, followed by an initial public meeting held in Wigan on 7 November that was reported by a Liverpool newspaper: (Note: Vignoles (1889) has the date as 29 November.)

Wigan Railway.-On Wednesday se'nnight a meeting of gentlemen favourable to the construction of a branch railroad, to connect Wigan and its neighbourhood with the Liverpool and Manchester railway, was held at the Eagle and Child Inn, in Wigan, at which Ralph Thicknesse, Esq. presided, and at which a variety of resolutions were passed. The substance of these was, that a line of road then and there suggested by Mr. Vignoles, the engineer, which includes a branch to join the Lancaster Canal, should be adopted; that notice should be given of the company's intention to apply next session for an Act of Parliament to carry the object into effect; that £60,000 should be the capital of the company, and not £40,000 as at first proposed; and that a committee be appointed at the next meeting (which was to take place yesterday) to conduct the company's affairs. In conclusion, R. Greenough, Esq. was called to the chair, and the thanks of the meeting were given to the Mr. Thicknesse for his able conduct in the chair. (Note: se'nnight is an old phrase for a week)

Wigan Branch Railway Act 1830
- Act of Parliament
- Parliament of the United Kingdom
- Long title: An Act for making and maintaining a Railway from the Borough of Wigan to the Liverpool and Manchester Railway, in the Borough of Newton, in the County Palatine of Lancaster, and collateral Branches to communicate therewith.
- Citation: 11 Geo. 4 & 1 Will. 4. c. lvi

Dates
- Royal assent: 29 May 1830

Other legislation
- Repealed by: North Union Railway Act 1834

Status: Repealed

Text of statute as originally enacted

The Wigan Branch Railway obtained an act of Parliament, the Wigan Branch Railway Act 1830 (11 Geo. 4 & 1 Will. 4. c. lvi), on 29 May 1830 to build a 6 miles 47 chains (10.6 km) line from the Liverpool and Manchester Railway (L&MR) near Parkside to Wigan. (Note: Railways in the United Kingdom are, for historical reasons, measured in miles and chains. A chain is 22 yards (20 m) long, there are 80 chains to the mile.) The act included a 2 miles 54 chains (4.3 km) branch, the Springs branch, with connections to collieries in the district. (Note: An Act for making and maintaining a Railway from the Borough of Wigan to the Liverpool and Manchester Railway in the Borough of Newton in the County Palatine of Lancaster, and Collateral Branches to communicate therewith.)

The line was promoted by 19 sponsors who were mainly Wigan-area coal merchants and colliery owners. They wanted a cheaper and faster way to get their coal to Liverpool and Manchester than using the canals. (Note: The initial proprietors named in the Act were: Sir Robert Holt Leigh, Thomas Legh, John Walmsley, Ralph Thicknesse, Samuel Newton, James Brownhill Boothby, John Ashton Yates, Ralph Greenough, Reece Bevan, William Greenough, Harmood Banner, Joseph Wagstaffe, Joseph Rylands, George Wood, Richard Tennant, Samuel Blain, William Blain, John Bewley and Joseph Neville.) Ralph Thicknesse was elected as the first chairman. Other original prominent shareholders were Edward Cropper, a Liverpool businessman and shareholder of the L&MR; and James Chapman also a shareholder in the L&MR, Chapman was appointed treasurer, secretary and general superintendent of the WBR in June 1830. After the first year Theodore Woolman Rathbone, also a shareholder of the L&MR, became a shareholder and director and at the following general meeting he was elected chairman.

=== Plans ===
The line as planned would have had multiple connections at the southern end where it connected to the L&MR at Parkside, the plans show that it was intended to have east and west facing curves and a spur to Parkside station arriving at right angles. The Springs branch was also intended to make both north and south facing junctions with the main line. There were no intermediate stations planned and the northern terminus was situated at Chapel Lane in Wigan.

=== Construction ===
In June 1830 Charles Vignoles was appointed engineer. He was familiar with the area having been involved with surveying the L&MR. (Note: His initial salary is variously quoted as £500 (Sweeney(2008)) or £650 (Vignoles(1889)) equivalent to approximately £45,000 and £58,630 in 2019.)

The line was constructed by contractors Pritchard & Hoof who were also awarded a two-year maintenance contract. The contract was not a success and they were relieved of the maintenance element before the end of the contractual period resulting in legal action that the contractors won.

The intention had been to construct a double track railway but money was in short supply and economies were made resulting in only the main line being constructed, it was engineered with enough space for a double track but only a single track was laid, with three passing loops per mile and only the east facing curve was provided at Parkside.

=== Operations ===
The line opened to traffic on 3 September 1832 without ceremony, the directors travelled in a separate carriage attached to the first train in each direction before dining together at Wigan.

The Wigan Branch Railway did not hire its own staff or provide motive power and rolling stock. Instead the line was worked under contract by the L&MR who provided a locomotive and a few coaches for passengers to run thrice daily each way between Parkside and Wigan. (Note: Dawson (2020) records this as a small engine and one or two coaches, Thomas (1980) has it as one of the older locomotives and four carriages.) The L&MR agreed to provide porters to turn the coaches at Parkside and the WBR was to provide a guard for each train, the establishment at Wigan, make all the bookings and collect the fares for passengers and parcels at Wigan, the receipts were to be apportioned according to a formula that took account of the relative use of each line, fares were set at 5s for first class and 3s 6d for second class for any journey between Wigan and Liverpool or Manchester.

As the line was operated under contract by the L&MR it likely followed L&MR practices. On the L&MR intermediate stopping places were neither advertised nor provided with facilities, they were mostly situated at level crossings where a policeman or gateman was permanently on duty, passengers wishing to use the stopping place informed the staff who signalled the requirement to stop to the train crew. The WBR had one crossing on the level, at Golborne, 1 mile 72 chains (3.1 km) from Parkside, where the Warrington to Wigan turnpike crossed the railway at a gated level crossing known as Golborne Gates and this would have been an identified stopping place on the line and therefore may have operated as a station in the same way as on the L&MR.

There is no evidence that through carriages ran between Wigan and Liverpool or Manchester at this time, it appears that passengers had to change at Parkside where they walked between the trains. In October 1832 the WBR arranged for a glass coach to run from Parkside to Newton Junction to meet the morning first class trains from Liverpool and Manchester. (Note: The expression glass coach was used on the L&MR who ran two sorts of first class coaches, fully enclosed, glazed glass coaches and curtained, or open coaches.)

The L&MR provided locomotives and wagons to convey freight between Wigan and Liverpool or Manchester at 5s per ton. (Note: The full terms of the agreement are set out in Reed (1969), initially the contract was for three months and thereafter, after slight adjustments, on three months notice. 5s (£0 5s 0d) and 3s6d (£0 3s 6d) would be approximately £23.40 and £16.38 in 2019.)

The railway announced in October 1832 that it would begin moving goods along the line and began construction of a warehouse at Wigan for this purpose.

From opening some colliery owners ran their own trains on the line, Richard Evans had a connection to it to transport coal from his Edge Green Colliery.

== Amalgamation ==
The construction of the Preston and Wigan Railway was authorised in 1831 but construction was delayed. The directors of the Wigan Branch Railway and Preston and Wigan Railway decided to merge and the North Union Railway Act 1834 (4 & 5 Will. 4. c. xxv) gained royal assent on 22 May 1834 incorporating the two merged railways as the North Union Railway. (Note: An Act for uniting the Wigan Branch Railway Company and the Preston and Wigan Railway Company; for authorizing an Alteration to be made in the Line of the last-mentioned Railway; and for repealing, altering, and amending the Acts relating to the said Railways)
