= Parkside railway station (Merseyside) =

Train stop halfway between Liverpool and Manchester

Parkside

General information
- Location: Newton-le-Willows, St Helens; England
- Coordinates: 53.456°N 2.5895°W
- Grid reference: SJ609956
- Platforms: 2

Other information
- Status: Disused

History
- Original company: Liverpool and Manchester Railway
- Pre-grouping: London and North Western Railway

Key dates
- 17 September 1830: Opened
- 31 October 1838: Relocated
- 1 May 1878: Closed
Location

Parkside railway station was an original station on the Liverpool and Manchester Railway. It then became the interchange station between lines when the Wigan Branch Railway opened in 1832, moving to the physical junction of the two lines in 1838. The station continued as an interchange until being by-passed in 1847 when a west curve was opened to facilitate north–south links that did not go through the station. Traffic declined further after the Winwick cut-off opened in 1864 leading to closure in 1878.

== First station ==
The original Parkside station opened on 17 September 1830 as part of the Liverpool and Manchester Railway (L&MR), and was one of the oldest passenger railway stations in the world.

These early intermediate stations were often little more than halts, usually positioned where the railway was crossed by a road or turnpike. This probably accounts for variations in the names of these stopping places, this station was located where Parkside Lane (later called Warrington Road, a road between Wigan and Warrington) crossed the line. Quick (2022) reports that the station was variously known as Parkside, Park Side and Parkside & Wigan Junction in its first decade of existence before settling on Parkside.

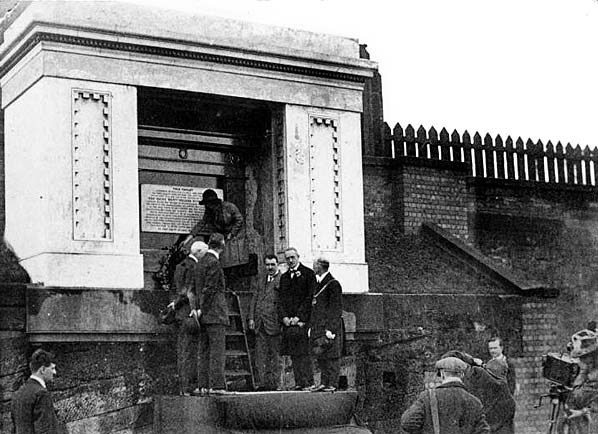
Huskisson Memorial 1913

During the opening ceremony the MP William Huskisson was killed in an accident at the station. A memorial to Huskisson was paid for by the railway and erected at the trackside in 1831. The memorial has subsequently been granted listed building status and remains at the site of the original station near Newton-le-Willows. (Note: The tablet displayed in the memorial is a reproduction of the original which is kept at the National Railway Museum in York.)

Parkside was one of only two intermediate stops on the L&MR where locomotives could be fuelled and watered (the other was at Eccles), it was well placed to do so being about halfway along the line, 14 miles 58 chains (23.7 km) from Edge Hill (Note: Measured from Edge Hill as that is where locomotives were attached to trains, stationary steam engines were used on the inclines on the other side of the station.) and 14 miles 29 chains (23.1 km) from Manchester Liverpool Road. (Note: Railways in the United Kingdom are, for historical reasons, measured in miles and chains. A chain is 22 yards (20 m) long, there are 80 chains to the mile.) In the early days the water was pre-heated by a lineside boiler. The boiler's chimney can be seen on the right in Bury's print.

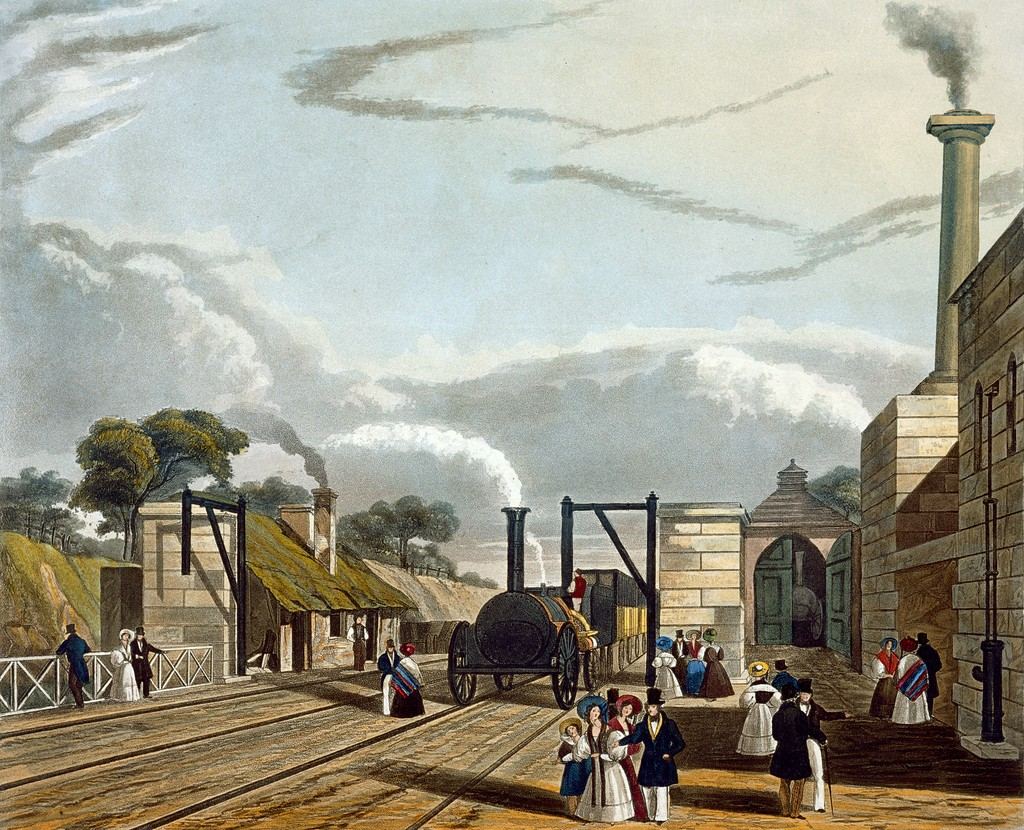
Taking in water at Parkside, from Bury's Liverpool and Manchester Railway, 1831

The Wigan Branch Railway (WBR) opened on 3 September 1832 forming a junction with the L&MR to the East of Parkside station with an east curve (that is towards Manchester). A west curve and a flat crossing of the L&MR had been planned, and authorised, but weren't built because of financial considerations. One of these unconstructed sections had been intended to meet a similarly unconstructed east curve of the Warrington and Newton Railway which had also not been constructed for the same reason.

The lack of these two curves made through south–north journeys very difficult, for example a train or carriages coming from Warrington in the south heading to Wigan in the north would have to pass through Newton Junction station, reverse onto the mainline, pass through the station again, pass through Parkside station, then reverse again to take the WBR, avoiding any interference with the regular and busy traffic already using the L&MR. This would have undoubtedly caused operational problems and therefore Parkside became the terminus station for trains on the WBR. There is doubt about how any transfer of passengers took place between the lines, it is unlikely that WBR trains ran from their single-track railway into the station on the L&MR double track, they would have had to reverse to do so, the WBR train likely stopped before the junction and passengers simply walked to the L&MR station. (Note: Reversing engines in this era was no easy task, see for example Ahrons (1927).)

Sweeney (2008) records there were complaints in October 1832 that passengers had to wait without shelter when changing trains, and the railways jointly funded the building of a waiting shed.

In 1834 the WBR became part of the North Union Railway (NUR). By 1837 there were 5 tracks at Parkside, Up and Down L&MR lines, Up and Down NUR lines (the NUR had by now installed its second running line) and a siding which ran into the point of the junction, this siding was probably used for an engine shed. The illustration by Tate shows the new station with the four lines running away from the junction to where the first station was located before the overbridge in the distance, also to be seen are the two NUR lines going to the right towards Wigan.

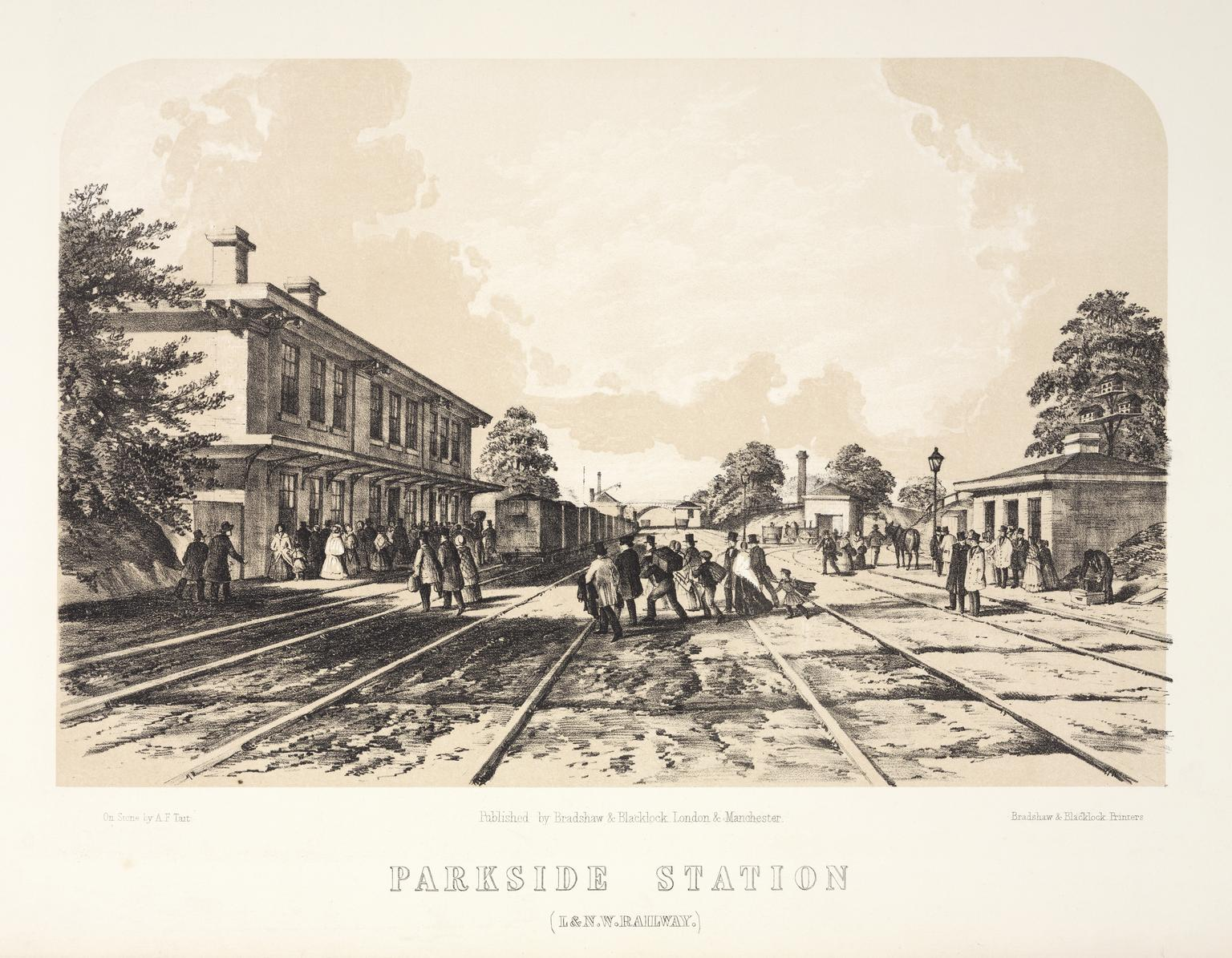
Parkside Station from Views on the London & North Western Railway - Tait, 1848

After the passenger station was moved to the junction this first station remained open as a goods station, being labelled a "Luggage Station" on the 1849 OS map. It is not recorded when the goods station closed but by the 1894 edition of the Ordnance Survey the site was labelled as a pumping station with a couple of sidings leading into it.

== Second station ==
On 31 October 1838, the station was relocated approximately 17 chains (340 m) east, to be at the junction of lines with the NUR which opened on the same day through to Preston. The station was constructed jointly by the L&MR, NUR and Grand Junction Railway (GJR) which had by that time absorbed the Warrington and Newton Railway. The GJR apparently contributed to the cost of the new station as an alternative to having to build a direct connection between the Warrington and Wigan lines. It was a two-storey building with a booking office, general waiting room, a ladies room and offices. The station was gas-lit in 1841, the three companies shared the cost of the installation.

This new station did not solve all the traffic problems, trains from the Liverpool, or Warrington (the east curve at Newton Junction had opened on 4 July 1837) directions still had to reverse at Parkside in order to access the northbound NUR line and vice versa. The Tate illustration does not appear to show any interconnection between the L&MR lines on the left and the NUR lines on the right, indeed it shows passengers making their way across the lines from one side of the station to the other, indicating a pedestrian changing of trains.

In 1845 the L&MR and others amalgamated into an expanded Grand Junction Railway and a year later the GJR itself amalgamated to form the London and North Western Railway (L&NWR).

== Junctions ==
There were two junctions associated with Parkside station;

- one to the east of the original station facing Manchester, to which the station was relocated in 1838, this junction was known at different times as Parkside East Junction, Parkside Manchester Junction, and since at least 2005, Parkside Junction.
- one to the west of both stations which opened in 1847 facing Newton Bridge (later called Newton-le-Willows) and Liverpool was known variously as Parkside West Junction, Parkside & Liverpool Junction, and since at least 2005, Newton-le-Willows Junction.

The two curves from the above junctions joined to the north of Parkside where Preston Junction station was built, this junction was known initially as Preston Junction but then became Lowton Junction by which name it is still known.

The lines from Newton-le-Willows through the west facing junction and Lowton junction formed a secondary West Coast Main Line (WCML) route that was electrified as part of the WCML modernisation which was completed in 1974. The east facing curve and the main line between Newton-le-Willows and Castlefield Junction in Manchester was electrified on 9 December 2013.

== Services ==
What follows describes the passenger services that ran through Parkside, there were also freight trains, both owned by the companies and private operators.

=== 1830-1832 ===
The L&MR started regular passenger services on 17 September 1830, they ran three first class trains in each direction daily and introduced second class trains a week later running two daily in each direction, there were fewer trains on Sundays. The Company policy at the time was only to publish departure times from the termini, and there were no intermediate stations only recognised stopping places, of which Parkside was one as locomotives needed to take on water here. (Note: The L&MR had first and second class coaches but they ran them as first and second class trains, first class trains were composed of only first class coaches, were faster because they had fewer stops, usually only Newton Bridge, whereas second class trains stopped wherever required, initially they had only second class coaches but later also had first class for the convenience of first class passengers who wished to use intermediate stations.)

Quick (2022) documents the lack of timetables at this time, it is known how many trains ran but not where and when they stopped on-route. the L&MR did publish fares from intermediate stations even if they didn't provide times, in 1832 it cost 3s 0d first class to Liverpool or Manchester, 2s 6d second class to Liverpool but only 2s 0d to Manchester. (Note: 3s (£0 3s 0d), 2s 6d (£0 2s 6d) and 2s (£0 2s 0d) would be approximately £14, £11.70 and £9.36 in 2019)

=== 1832-1839 ===
The situation on the L&MR continued much as described above except the railway became more popular and therefore more trains were run, by 1836 the timetable had settled down to 10 trains daily each way between Liverpool and Manchester, with an extra two trains during the summer.

The L&MR agreed to operate the WBR when it opened in September 1832, initially a passenger service was run utilising "an engine of the 'oldest' construction hauling four coaches", and the fares were fixed at 5s 0d and 3s 6d from Wigan to Liverpool or Manchester (or the reverse) for first and second class respectively. (Note: 5s (£0 5s 0d) and 3s 6d (£0 3s 6d) would be approximately £23.40 and £16.34 in 2019) The average journey time from Parkside to Wigan was 15 Minutes, and passengers would need to change trains at Parkside to continue their journey.

The WBR arranged in October 1832 for a glass coach (Note: On the L&MR some first class carriages had curtains instead of windows, after their introduction the regular, glazed, carriages were known as "glass coaches".) to meet the morning first class trains at Newton Junction and transport first class passengers to Parkside. These arrangements continued when the WBR amalgamated to become the North Union Railway (NUR) until the NUR line to Preston, and the relocated station opened on 31 October 1838.

=== 1839-1842 ===
Services became more complicated in 1838–39 because the NUR opened between Wigan and Preston, and the Grand Junction Railway (GJR) opened between Newton and Birmingham, and between Birmingham and London. This enabled through journeys from south–north as well as the original east–west, and additionally from the south and north to both Liverpool and Manchester. This was three railways running trains through or connecting at Parkside.

The L&MR services continued much as normal with 11 trains each way between Liverpool and Manchester.

From February 1839 the NUR ran four southbound passenger trains on weekdays, departing Preston for Liverpool, Manchester and Wigan at 0820 (mixed train), 1040 (first class), 1420 (second class) and 1620 (mixed train), on Sundays there were two mixed class trains at 0645 and 1715. Additionally, mail trains for Birmingham and London departed at 1710 and 0208, passengers were advised that in addition to the mail trains they could also proceed to the south by booking to Parkside and waiting for a short time for the next GJR train. All of these trains went through Parkside, and those in the opposite direction which are not mentioned in the company advertisement about return train times.

The GJR had weekday trains leaving Manchester to Birmingham at 0330 (first class), 0600 (mixed class), 0815 (first class), 1030 (first class), 1215 (first class), 1600 (mixed class) and 1900 (first class), these trains all went through Parkside and Newton to connect with trains from Liverpool (which did not go through Parkside) at Warrington, most of them connected with London trains at Birmingham. In the opposite direction three of the GJR trains connected with NUR trains at Parkside.

The L&MR and NUR companies agreed that each would operate its own passenger trains on its own line but that through coaches would be provided between Preston and Liverpool and Manchester. The GJR ran its own trains over the L&MR to Manchester.

This was probably the peak of services through the station.

== Demise and closure ==
The stations importance declined gradually. Advances to locomotive technology meant locomotives could make their journey between Liverpool and Manchester without needing to stop at Parkside to refuel.

In 1842 the Manchester and Birmingham Railway (M&BR) opened the direct line between Crewe and Manchester, this shorter route was used by the GJR in partnership with the M&BR and its trains to Manchester stopped running through Parkside.

In 1843 the Bolton and Preston Railway (B&PR) opened the line between the NUR at Euxton and Bolton, the Manchester and Bolton Railway line was already operating between Bolton and Manchester. After the B&PR became part of the NUR in 1844 the NUR used both this more direct route and via parkside for trains from the north to Manchester, partly because it combined the service with that bound for Liverpool, dividing the train at Parkside. The February 1844 departure schedule from Preston shows 5 services each way via Parkside (2 of which continued on to London and one to Birmingham) and 4 services via Bolton.

A west curve and Preston Junction station was opened by the L&NWR in 1847 which made north–south travel easier but reduced Parkside's importance as an interchange. The L&NWR used Preston Junction to exchange passengers with the North Union Railway, so passengers no longer changed trains at Parkside. From around this time trains going north towards Wigan from Warrington or Liverpool didn't pass through Parkside.

By 1855 the station is only listed in the Liverpool to Manchester service table with four trains to Manchester and three to Liverpool.

In 1864, the L&NWR constructed the Winwick cut-off which by-passed Parkside and its junctions, making the north–south journey much easier but effectively made Parkside redundant as an interchange.

Map showing the rural area around Parkside railway junctions and former station sites

Finally, there was very limited local demand as Parkside, even today, remains relatively rural.

The station closed on 1 May 1878, although the buildings continued in use as cottages for some time afterwards.

Preceding station	Historical railways	Following station
	East-West line	
Newton Junction	Liverpool and Manchester Railway; 1830 – 1843	Bolton Junction
Newton Junction	Liverpool and Manchester Railway; 1843 – 1845	Kenyon Junction; Station renamed
Newton Bridge; New station	Grand Junction Railway; Liverpool and Manchester Railway; 1845 – 1846; Amalgamated	Kenyon Junction
Newton Bridge	London and North Western Railway; Grand Junction Railway; Liverpool and Manchester Railway; 1846 – 1878; Amalgamated	Kenyon Junction
	Northbound line	
Wigan Chapel Lane	Wigan Branch Railway; 1832 – 1834	Terminus
Wigan Chapel Lane	North Union Railway; Wigan Branch Railway; 1834 – 1838; Amalgamated	Terminus
Wigan; Station rebuilt and renamed	North Union Railway; Wigan Branch Railway; 1838 – 1847	Terminus
Preston Junction; New station	London and North Western Railway; North Union Railway; Wigan Branch Railway; 1847 – 1878; Leased line	Terminus
	Current situation	
Newton-le-Willows; Formerly Newton Bridge; Line and station open	Parkside; Lines open, station closed 1878	Kenyon Junction; Line open, station closed
Lowton; Formerly Preston Junction; Line open, station closed	Parkside; Lines open, station closed 1878	Kenyon Junction; Line open, station closed
