= Wigan North Western railway station =

Railway station in Greater Manchester, England

Wigan North Western
- Platforms 5, 4 and 3 at Wigan North Western, 2026

General information
- Location: Wigan, Metropolitan Borough of Wigan, England
- Coordinates: 53.5430°N 2.6320°W
- Grid reference: SD581053
- Manager: Avanti West Coast
- Transit authority: Transport for Greater Manchester
- Platforms: 6 (5 in use)

Other information
- Station code: WGN
- Fare zone: Greater Manchester Rail Zone 3
- Classification: DfT category B

History
- Original company: North Union Railway
- Pre-grouping: London and North Western Railway
- Post-grouping: London, Midland and Scottish Railway

Key dates
- 31 October 1838: Opened as Wigan
- 2 June 1924: Renamed Wigan North Western

Passengers
- 2021/22: ▲1.168 million
- Interchange: ▲0.970 million
- 2022/23: ▲1.183 million
- Interchange: ▼0.695 million
- 2023/24: ▲1.260 million
- Interchange: ▲0.828 million
- 2024/25: ▲1.360 million
- Interchange: ▲0.894 million
- 2025/26: ▲1.529 million
- Interchange: ▲0.961 million
Location
Notes
- Passenger statistics from the Office of Rail and Road

Wigan North Western is one of two railway stations that serve the town centre of Wigan, in Greater Manchester, England; the other is Wigan Wallgate, 110 yards (100 m) away. It lies on the West Coast Main Line between Warrington Bank Quay and Euxton Balshaw Lane, 6 miles 47 chains (10.6 km) from Newton-Le-Willows junction.

The station is suffixed North Western because it formerly belonged to the London and North Western Railway (LNWR). In 2009, it was identified as one of the ten worst category B interchange stations for mystery shopper assessment of fabric and environment and was set to receive a share of £50m funding for improvements.

== History ==
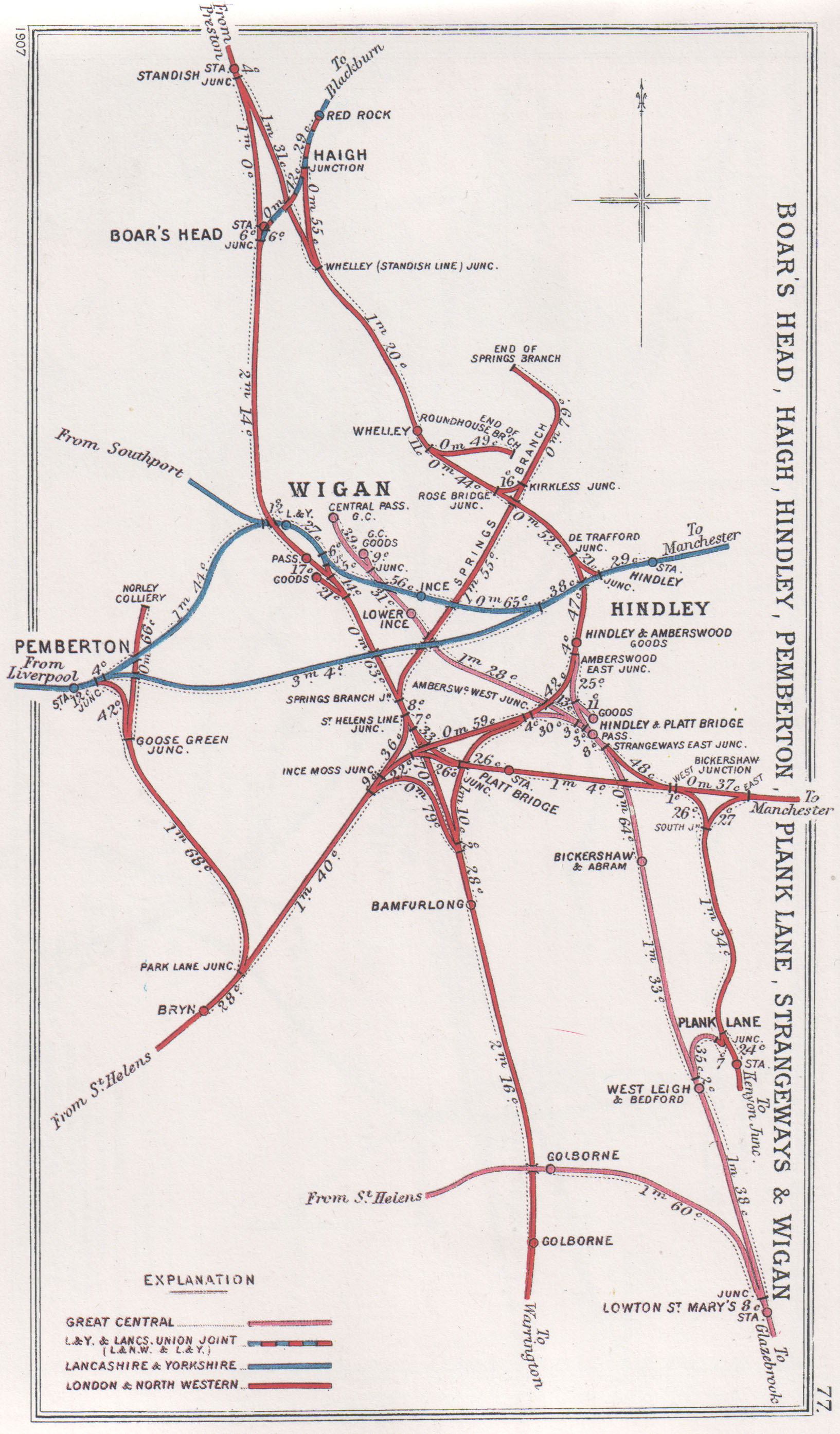
Lines around Wigan in 1907

The Wigan Branch Railway opened on 3 September 1832 between the Liverpool and Manchester Railway at Parkside Junction, in Newton-le-Willows, and Wigan. The original station in the town was located close to Chapel Lane, with three trains per day connecting with the Liverpool and Manchester trains at Parkside.

The North Union Railway opened between Wigan and Preston on 31 October 1838 and so the station was relocated to its present position. The LNWR was formed as a result of the progressive amalgamation of various earlier lines, including the Grand Junction Railway in 1846.

=== Accidents and incidents ===
The station was the site of a fatal accident on 2 August 1873. As the train ran through Wigan North Western station the driver glanced back and saw sparks flying to the rear of the train. The first 15 carriages of the fast-moving train had passed safely through the station, but two wheels of the 16th coach had derailed at a set of facing points. A luggage van that had derailed completely, demolished a lineside shunter's cabin and lost its side in the process. However the following carriages had all derailed on the points and broken away from the train. They lay shattered at the start of the platform and on the passing loop behind it, leaving 13 dead and 30 injured. Only the last coach and rear brake-van were undamaged. The front portion of the train continued to Scotland 90 minutes later.

== Layout ==
The station platforms are generally used for the following purposes:

- Platform 1 is used for some services to Stalybridge via Bolton and Manchester Victoria on Sundays
- Platform 2 was a bay platform but is no longer in use after platform 3 was extended at the end of 2020. The track serving it has been lifted and the face fenced off
- Platform 3 is a bay platform, used by early morning and late evening Northern services to Manchester Victoria and Leeds, via Walkden and the Calder Valley (as the December 2022 timetable rerouted Wigan to Leeds services to operate from Wigan Wallgate); Sunday services to Manchester Victoria, via Bolton; and as a reversing siding allowing trains and locomotives for Springs Branch depot to approach from and leave south of the depot as it can only be entered from the north.
- Platform 4 is used for Avanti West Coast services to London Euston and Birmingham New Street and Northern Trains services to Liverpool Lime Street.
- Platform 5 is for northbound services to Glasgow Central and Edinburgh Waverley. It is also used for services to Blackpool North
- Platform 6 is used to terminate Merseyrail's City Line services arriving from the Liverpool–Wigan line, which is operated by Northern Trains, and also used rarely for Avanti services if no other platforms are available.

== Passenger volume ==
Passenger Volume at Wigan North Western
	2002–03	2004–05	2005–06	2006–07	2007–08	2008–09	2009–10	2010–11	2011–12	2012–13	2013–14	2014–15	2015–16	2016–17	2017–18	2018–19	2019–20	2020–21	2021–22	2022–23
Entries and exits	1,108,080	1,253,745	1,396,601	544,313	962,171	1,038,503	960,121	1,066,546	1,073,710	1,071,012	1,154,040	1,282,076	1,380,716	1,620,278	1,583,806	1,683,184	1,604,012	386,422	1,168,204	1,182,964
Interchanges	– (Note: No data available.)	167,452	204,905	331,395	229,100	332,887	342,147	318,669	461,137	443,347	501,318	543,059	578,315	649,093	778,223	1,265,458	1,347,024	259,297	970,485	694,621

The statistics cover twelve month periods that start in April.

== Services ==
Wigan North Western is served by three train operating companies; they run the following off-peak services in trains per hour/day (tph/tpd):

=== Avanti West Coast ===
- 1 tph to Glasgow Central (having used the Trent Valley line)
- 1 tp2h to Glasgow Central (having used the Rugby–Birmingham–Stafford line)
- 1 tp2h to Edinburgh Waverley
- 1 tph to London Euston, via Warrington Bank Quay
- 1 tph to London Euston, via Wolverhampton, Birmingham New Street and Coventry
- 2 tpd to London Euston (from Blackpool North)
- 2 tpd to Blackpool North.

=== Northern Trains ===
- 2 tph to Liverpool Lime Street, via St Helens Central; 1 tp2h on Sunday
- 1 tph to Blackpool North.

=== TransPennine Express ===
- 4 tpd to Liverpool Lime Street
- 3 tpd to Glasgow Central
- 1 tpd to Oxenholme Lake District.

Preceding station	National Rail	Following station
Preston	Avanti West Coast West Coast Main Line	Warrington Bank Quay
Preston	Northern Trains Barrow-in-Furness/Windermere - Manchester Airport	Manchester Oxford Road
Euxton Balshaw Lane	Northern Trains Blackpool North - Liverpool Lime Street	St Helens Central
Terminus	Northern Trains Wigan North Western - Liverpool Lime Street	Bryn
Terminus	Northern Trains Wigan North Western - Leeds (Limited service)	Daisy Hill
Terminus	Northern Trains Wigan North Western - Leeds (Limited service)	Hindley
Terminus	Northern Trains Wigan North Western - Manchester Victoria (Limited service)	Eccles
Preston	TransPennine Express Glasgow Central - Liverpool Lime Street (Limited service)	St Helens Central
	Disused railways	
Bryn	London and North Western Railway; Lancashire Union Railway	Boar's Head

== See also ==
- West Coast Main Line route modernisation
- Wigan Central railway station
- Wigan Wallgate railway station

== Bibliography ==
- Holt, G.O. (1986). A Regional History of the Railways of Great Britain – vol.10 The North West. David & Charles. ISBN 0-946537-34-8.
- Nock, O.S. (1974). Electric Euston to Glasgow. Ian Allan. ISBN 0-7110-0530-3.
- Quick, Michael (2023). Railway Passenger Stations in Great Britain: A Chronology (PDF) (5th ed.). London: Railway and Canal Historical Society.
- Sweeney, D.J. (1996). A Lancashire Triangle – Part 1. Triangle Publishing. ISBN 0-9529333-0-6.
