= Hartford railway station =

Railway station in Cheshire, England

Coordinates: 53.242°N 2.554°W

Hartford
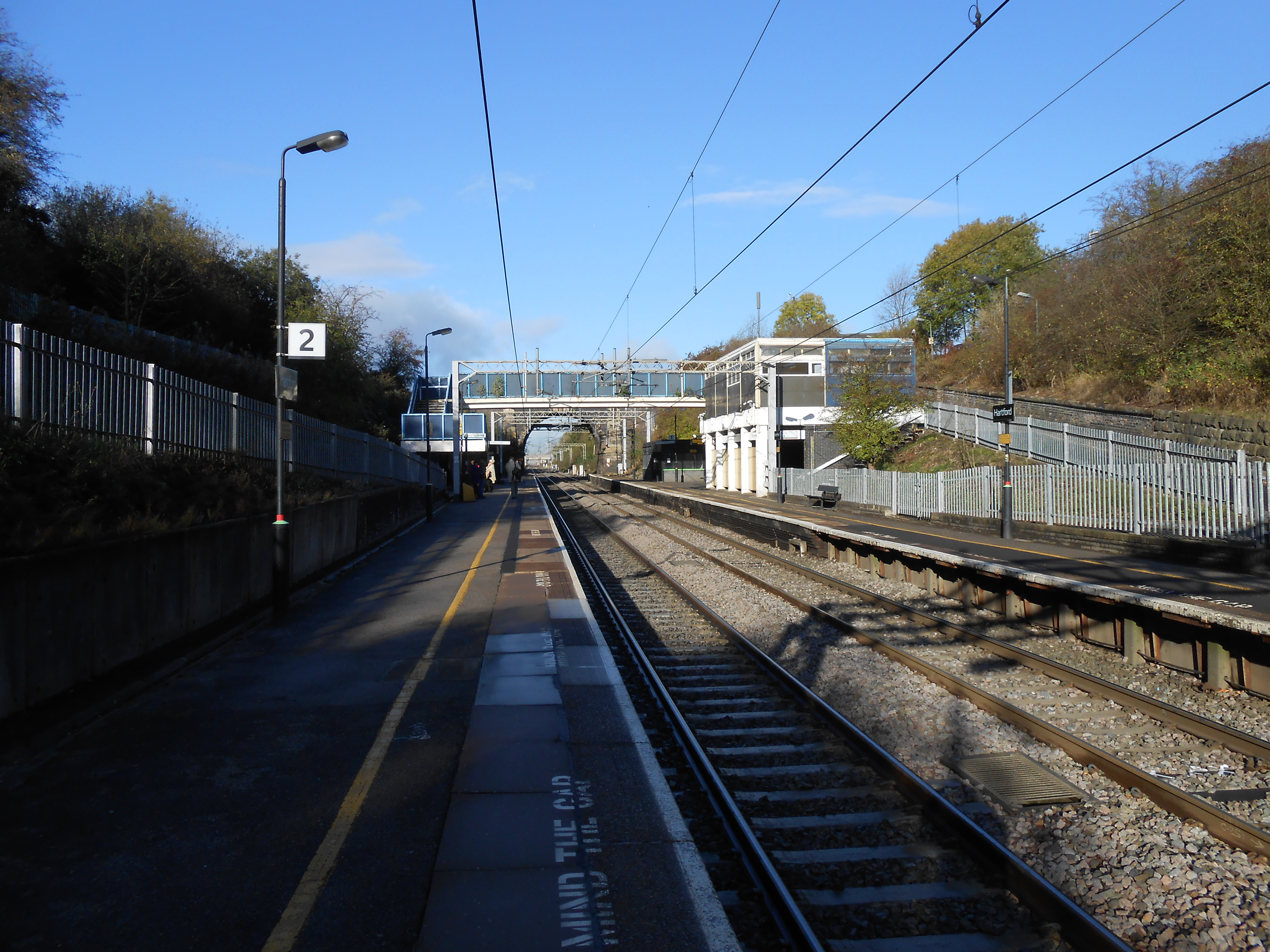

General information
- Location: Hartford, Borough of Cheshire West and Chester; England
- Grid reference: SJ631717
- Managed by: London Northwestern Railway
- Platforms: 2

Other information
- Station code: HTF
- Classification: DfT category D

Passengers
- 2020/21: ▼46,102
- 2021/22: ▲0.164 million
- 2022/23: ▲0.177 million
- 2023/24: ▲0.199 million
- 2024/25: ▲0.218 million
Location
Notes
- Passenger statistics from the Office of Rail and Road

Hartford railway station serves the village of Hartford, in Cheshire, England; the centre of the village is 0.8 miles (1.3 km) to the east, about 10–15 minutes walk away. It is situated on the A559 road, approximately two miles (3.2 km) west of the town of Northwich. This station is served by London Northwestern Railway and Avanti West Coast (from December 2025)

== History ==
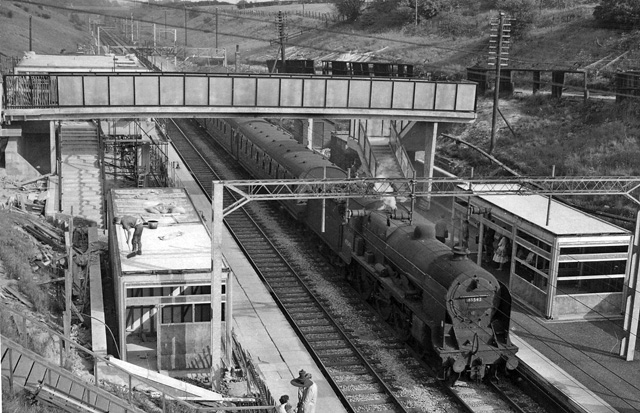
The station in 1961

Hartford station was built by the Grand Junction Railway (GJR) and opened in September 1837. The GJR became a constituent of the newly formed London and North Western Railway on 16 July 1846, which in turn was absorbed by the London Midland and Scottish Railway (LMSR) in 1923.

The LMSR was nationalised within British Railways on 1 January 1948; the station and its train services were thereafter operated by the London Midland Region of BR.

The station buildings were greatly rationalised at the time of the West Coast electrification in the 1960s.

== Facilities ==
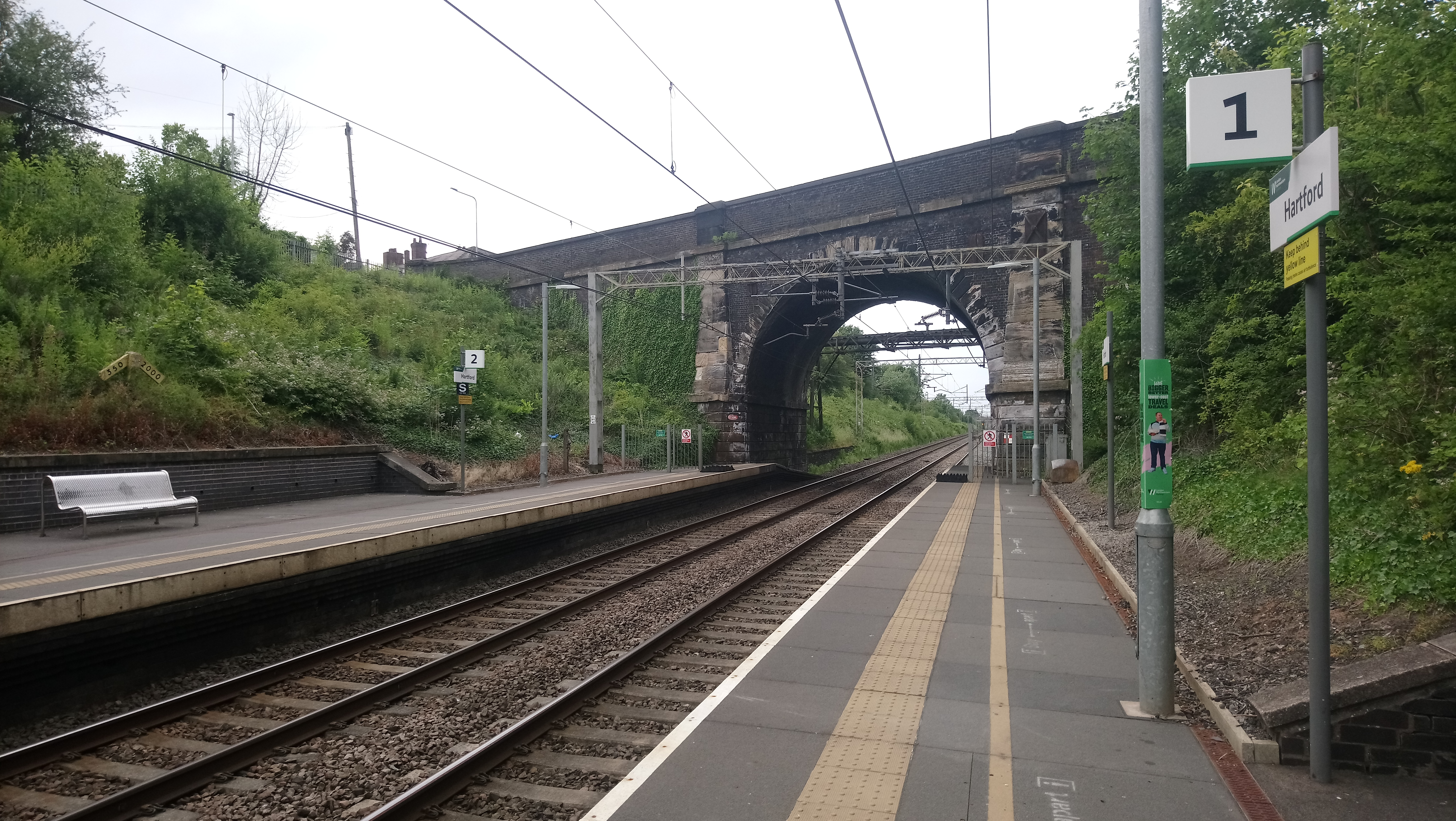
Looking north towards Acton Bridge and Warrington

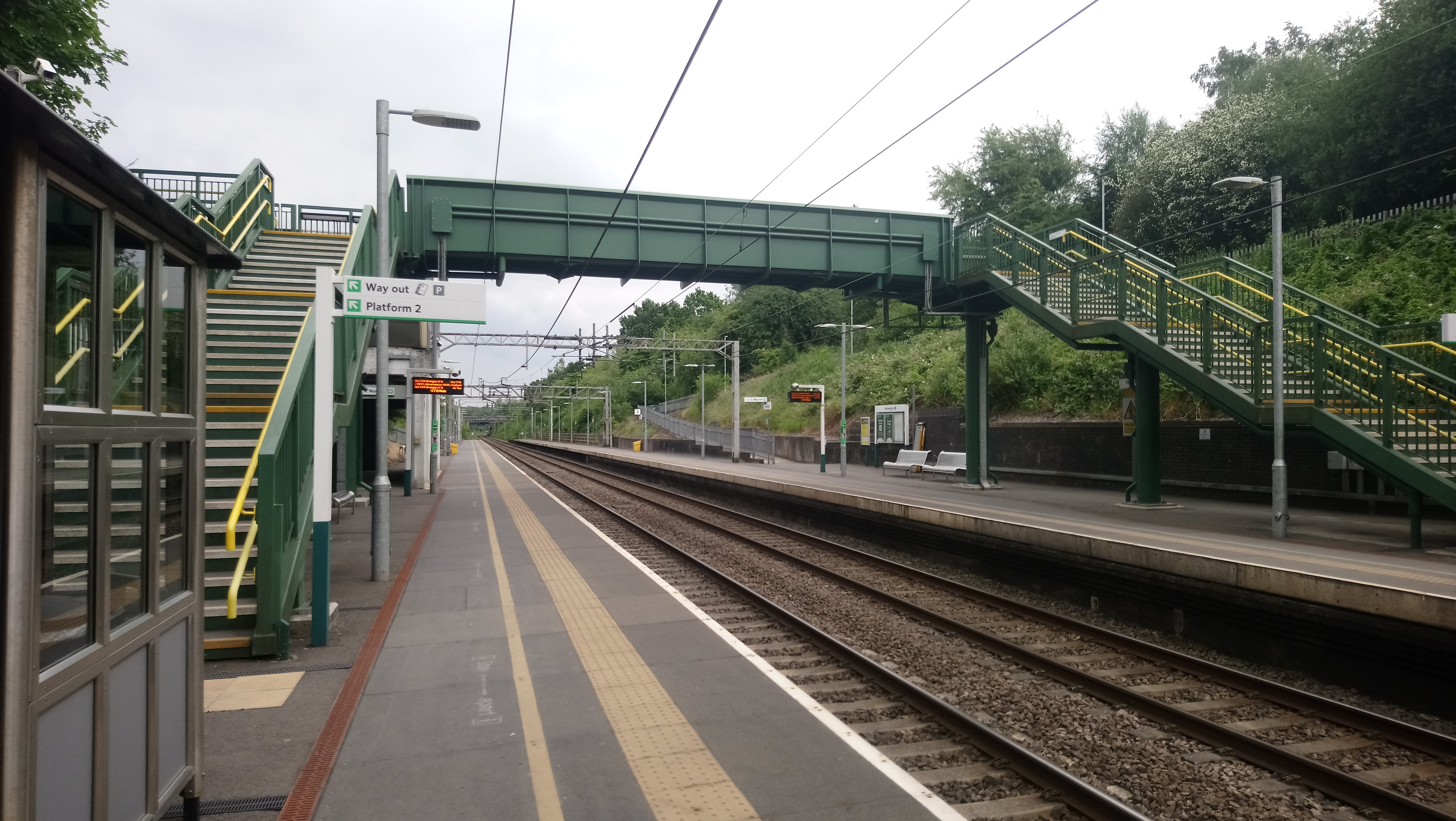
Looking south towards Winsford and Crewe

The station is in a cutting, with steps down from the car park. There is a ramp for wheelchairs but it is very steep. The station is staffed; the ticket office is open from start of services until late afternoon during the week and on Saturdays, but limited on a Sunday. There are bus stops and a public phone box on the road.

Greenbank railway station is about 1 mile (1.6 km) away, though nearer to Northwich, on the Mid-Cheshire Line from Chester to Manchester Piccadilly.

The station underwent an upgrade in spring 2011; it included new voice announcements, live arrivals and departure boards and new electronic systems.

Network Rail delivered more improvements to the station in summer 2014. These improvements ranged from replacing the station roof, resurfaced platforms and a new station footbridge. Step-free access is possible to both platforms via ramps from the nearby road.

== Services ==
West Midlands Trains operates one train per hour in each direction: northbound to Liverpool Lime Street via Runcorn and southbound to Birmingham New Street via Crewe, Stafford and Wolverhampton.

There is a daily Avanti West Coast service in each direction: southbound to London Euston during the early morning peak hours, and northbound to Liverpool Lime Street in the late evening peak hours.

| Preceding station | National Rail | Following station |
|---|---|---|
| Acton Bridge towards Liverpool Lime Street | London Northwestern Railway Birmingham–Liverpool | Winsford towards Birmingham New Street |
| Runcorn | Avanti West Coast; WCML Liverpool Branch | Crewe |
Historical Railways
| Winsford | London and North Western Railway; Grand Junction Railway | Acton Bridge |
