= Ordsall Lane railway station =

Former railway station in England

Coordinates: 53.4785°N 2.2635°W

Ordsall Lane

General information
- Location: Ordsall, Salford; England
- Grid reference: SJ825979
- Platforms: 5

Other information
- Status: Disused

History
- Original company: London and North Western Railway
- Pre-grouping: London and North Western Railway
- Post-grouping: London, Midland and Scottish Railway

Key dates
- 1 August 1849: Station opens
- 4 February 1957: Station closes
Location

Ordsall Lane railway station is a closed railway station on the Liverpool to Manchester line.

== History ==
The station was located on the Liverpool and Manchester Railway, which opened to traffic in September 1830. The station wasn't listed in initial timetables, but early company records state that it was one of the intermediate stopping points on the route. By August 1849 it had been fully opened to traffic, though even then it wasn't listed in Bradshaw's Guide until March 1850. One of its primary functions was to act as an interchange station between the L&MR (which from 1844 had been diverted to Manchester Victoria) and the 1849 link to the Manchester South Junction and Altrincham Railway at Castlefield Junction – as such it would eventually be expanded to five platforms by the end of the 19th century.

The station was closed to passenger traffic on 4 February 1957 by the British Transport Commission, through it remained substantially intact until well into the 1960s. A charter special stopped there for photographs in April 1966 and whilst the station buildings had been demolished by this point, the platforms were still extant. The remnants were eventually removed by British Rail in the mid-1970s, when the L&M route reverted to being a double track railway (the section from here to Patricroft had previously been quadrupled by the London and North Western Railway back in the early 1880s).

The opening of the Windsor Link connection from Salford Crescent in 1988 saw further major alterations to the site, with the existing junction significantly remodelled, a second one added, redundant trackwork being lifted and the area re-signalled. As a consequence, no trace remains of the station today.

| Preceding station | Disused railways | Following station |
|---|---|---|
| Cross Lane; Line open, station closed | LNW | Manchester Exchange; Line open, station closed |
| Cross Lane; Line open, station closed | LNW | Liverpool Road; Line and station closed |
