= Metropolitan Borough of Wigan =

Borough of Greater Manchester, England

- Metropolitan borough
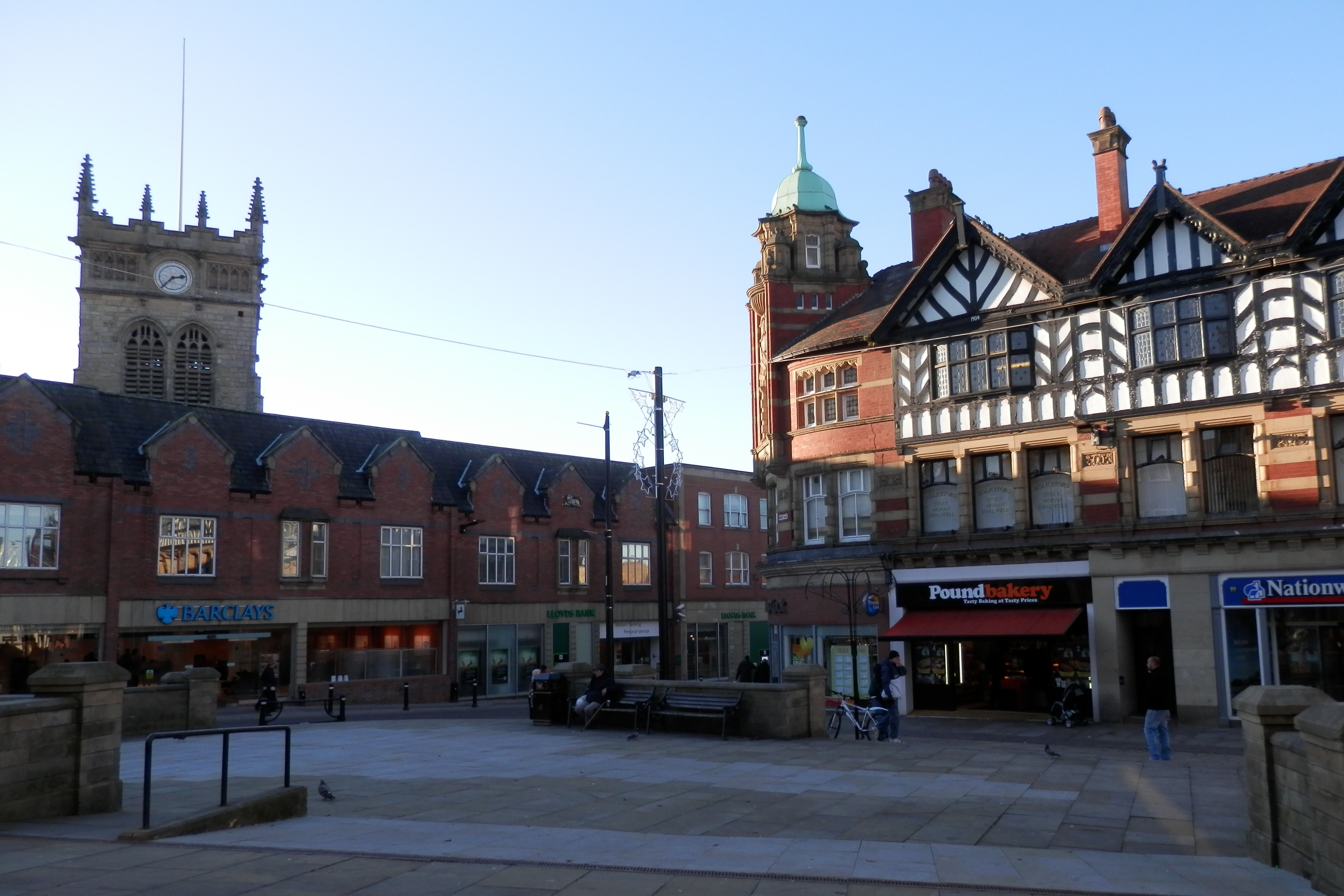
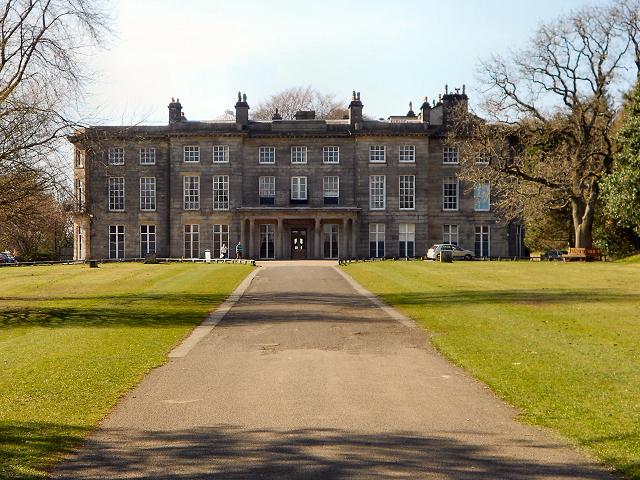
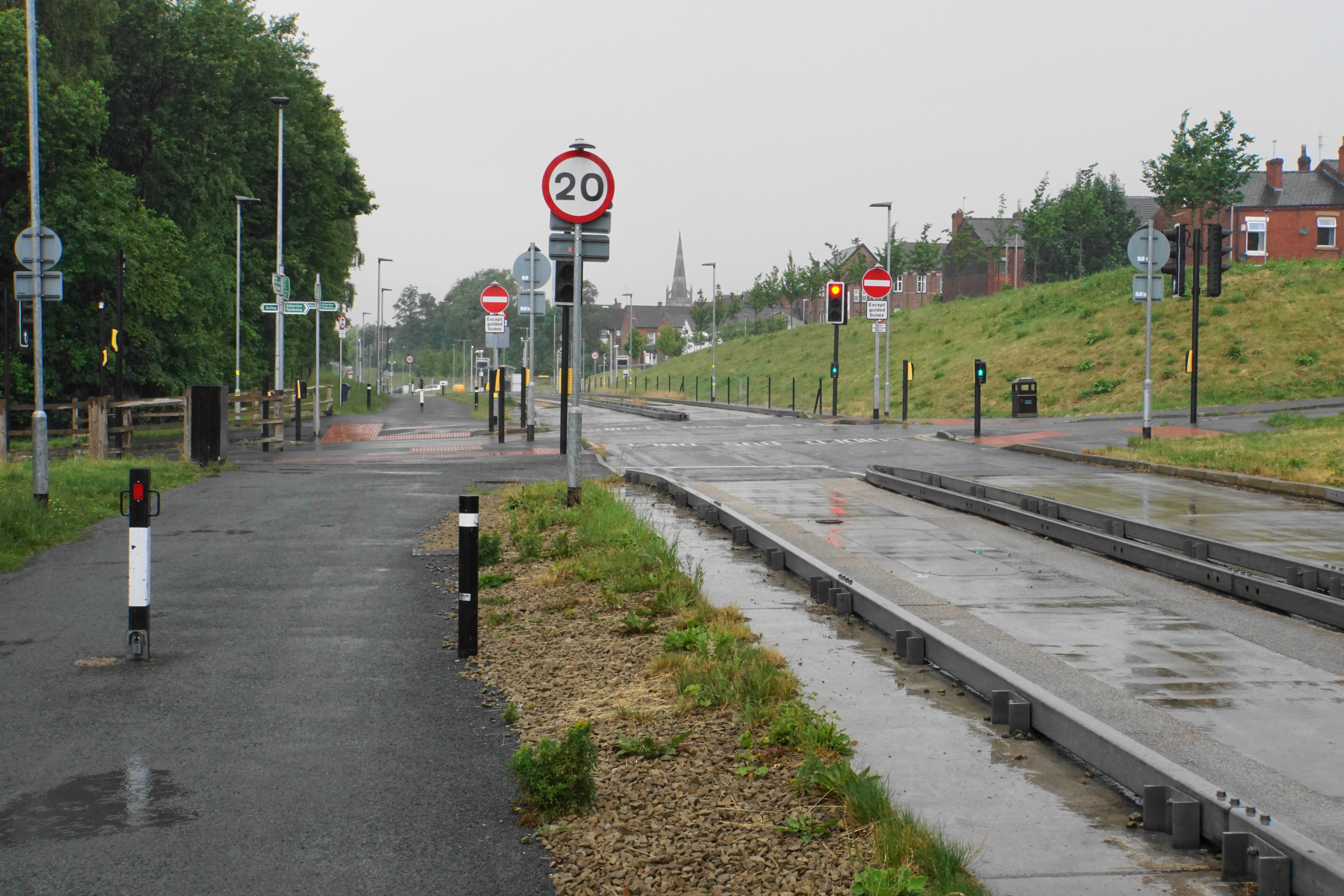
- Clockwise from the top; Wigan town centre with All Saints Church, the Leigh-Salford-Manchester Bus Rapid Transit in Tyldesley and Haigh Hall near Aspull

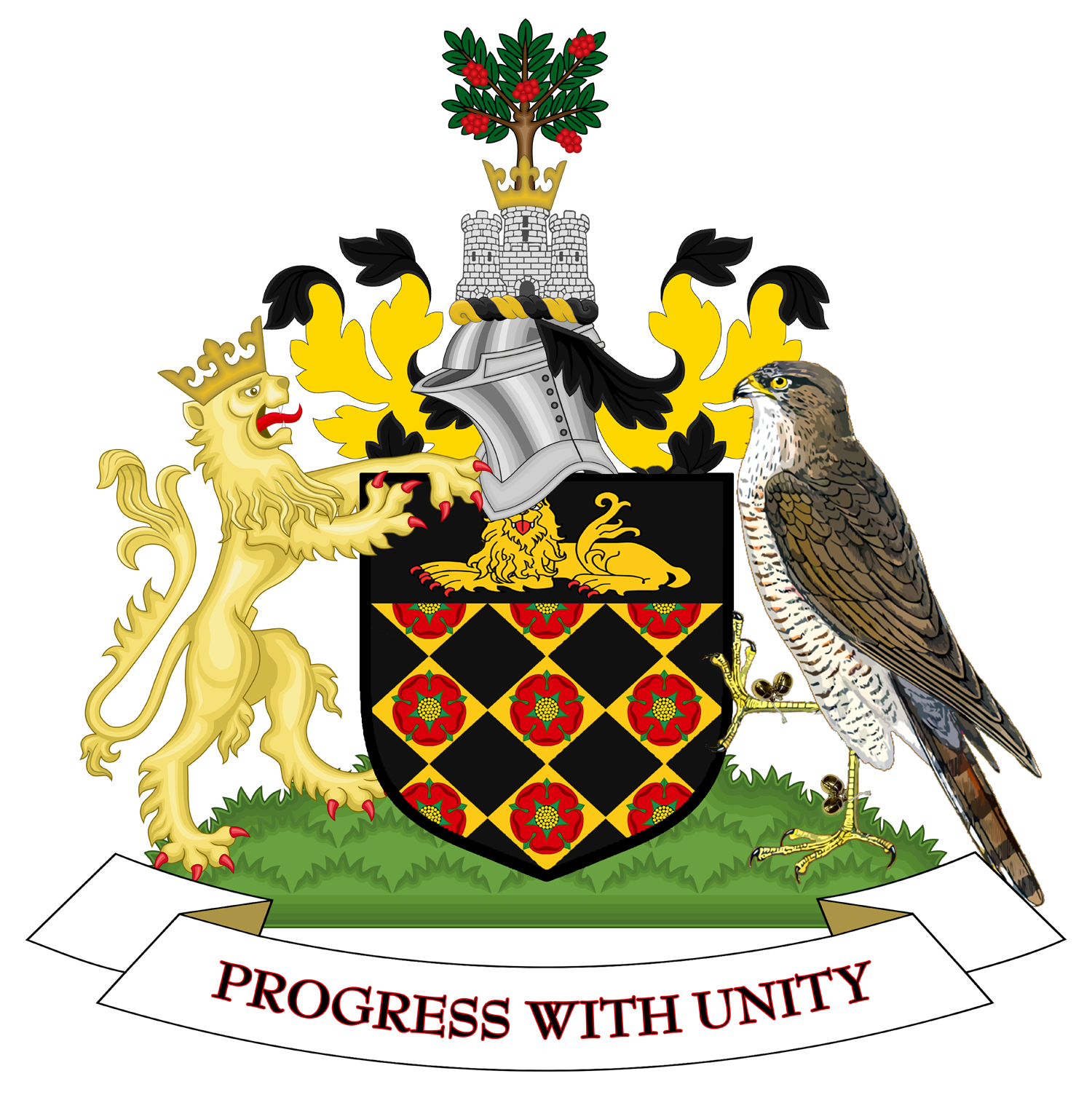
- Coat of arms
- Motto: Progress with Unity
- Wigan shown within Greater Manchester
- Coordinates: 53°32′N 2°37′W
- Sovereign state: United Kingdom
- Country: England
- Region: North West
- Ceremonial county and city region: Greater Manchester
- Historic county: Lancashire
- Incorporated: 1 April 1974
- Named for: Wigan
- Administrative HQ: Wigan Civic Centre

Government
  - Type: Metropolitan borough
  - Body: Wigan Metropolitan Borough Council
  - Executive: Leader and cabinet
  - Control: Labour
  - Leader: Nazia Rehman (L)
  - Mayor: Anne collins
  - MPs: 3 MPs: Andy Burnham (L); Jo Platt (L); Lisa Nandy (L)

Area
  - Total: 188 km^{2} (73 sq mi)
  - Rank: 150th

Population (2025)
  - Total: 347,089
  - Rank: 31st
  - Density: 1,845/km^{2} (4,780/sq mi)

Ethnicity (2021)
  - Ethnic groups: List: 95.0% White; 1.8% Asian; 1.3% Mixed; 1.2% Black; 0.7% other

Religion (2021)
  - Religion: List: 62.8% Christianity; 30.3% no religion; 1.3% Islam; 0.3% Hinduism; 0.3% Buddhism; 0.0% Sikhism; 0.0% Judaism; 0.3% other; 4.7% not stated
- Time zone: UTC+0 (GMT)
  - Summer (DST): UTC+1 (BST)
- Postcode area: M28–29; M46; WA3; WN1–7
- Dialling code: 01257; 0161; 01695; 01744; 01942
- ISO 3166 code: GB-WGN
- GSS code: E08000010
- Website: wigan.gov.uk

The Metropolitan Borough of Wigan is a metropolitan borough of Greater Manchester, England. It is named after its largest town, Wigan, but covers a far larger area which includes the towns of Atherton, Ashton-in-Makerfield, Golborne, Hindley, Ince-in-Makerfield, Leigh and Tyldesley. The borough also covers the villages and suburbs of Abram, Aspull, Astley, Bryn, Hindley Green, Lowton, Mosley Common, Orrell, Pemberton, Shevington, Standish, Winstanley and Worsley Mesnes. The borough is also the second-most populous district in Greater Manchester.

The borough was formed in 1974, replacing several former local government districts. It is the westernmost part of Greater Manchester and is bordered by the Greater Manchester boroughs of City of Salford and Bolton to the east, the Cheshire borough of Warrington to the south, the Merseyside borough of St Helens to the south west, and the Lancashire boroughs of West Lancashire to the west and Chorley to the north.

== History ==
Wigan metropolitan borough was created on 1 April 1974 by the Local Government Act 1972. It was formed from the former county borough of Wigan along with other local government units from the administrative county of Lancashire. These were the Municipal Borough of Leigh, the urban districts of Abram, Aspull, Atherton, Hindley, Ince-in-Makerfield, Orrell, Standish and Tyldesley. Ashton-in-Makerfield except for the parish of Seneley Green, the Golborne Urban District except for the parish of Culcheth and Glazebury in Warrington, the Higher End part of Billinge and Winstanley Urban District and the civil parishes of Haigh, Shevington and Worthington from the Wigan Rural District were included.

Before its creation, the name Wigan-Leigh was used in the Redcliffe-Maud Report. It was also suggested that the new metropolitan borough be named Makerfield. However, both names were rejected by a vote of 12 to 2. According to an opinion poll in 2003, 26% of 299 residents surveyed felt they belonged "very strongly" or "fairly strongly" (4% very strongly) to Greater Manchester, 64% (28% very strongly) to the borough of Wigan, and 63% (31% very strongly) to Lancashire.

The metropolitan borough was created from a highly industrialised area of Lancashire that was part of the Lancashire Coalfield and had an important textile industry.

== Geography ==
Wigan borough covers an area of 77 square miles (200 km^{2}), and is the 9th-largest metropolitan borough (out of 36) in England. The borough is positioned on the far western edge of Greater Manchester. Within Greater Manchester, it borders the Metropolitan Borough of Bolton to the north-east and east, and the City of Salford to the east. Outwith Greater Manchester, in the south it borders Warrington (a unitary authority in Cheshire); to the south-west it borders the Metropolitan Borough of St Helens in Merseyside. To the west, it borders the West Lancashire borough, and to the north it borders the Chorley borough, both in Lancashire.

Wigan borough has seven Local Nature Reserves: including Wigan Flashes LNR, Borsdane Wood LNR, between Hindley and Aspull, Greenslate Water Meadows LNR within Orrell Water Park in Orrell, Low Hall LNR between Hindley and Platt Bridge, Pennington Flash LNR, Kirkless LNR at Ince and Three Sisters LNR, Ashton-In-Makerfield.

== Governance ==
=== Local government ===
For 12 years from the creation of Greater Manchester in 1974, the borough had a two-tier system of local government, and Wigan Council shared power with the Greater Manchester County Council. The county council was abolished in 1986 by the Local Government Act 1985. Since April 2011, some of the borough's responsibilities have been pooled with neighbouring authorities and subsumed into the Greater Manchester Combined Authority, which covers ten boroughs including Wigan.

The first elections to the borough council were held on 10 May 1973. The Metropolitan Borough Council is divided into 25 wards, each of which elects three councillors. Elections are by thirds, with one councillor from each ward up for re-election in each election year. The borough council has a leader and cabinet system. The current leader is David Molyneux who took over from Peter Smith, who resigned in May 2018, having been leader since 1991. The council rejected the idea of a directly elected mayor following a consultation in 2001.

The Metropolitan Borough of Wigan is traditionally a Labour Party stronghold—the council has been Labour-controlled since its creation. The local elections in 1998 resulted in a council with only two non-Labour members.

Labour had a majority with 43 seats at the 2006 election. The second-largest party was the local Community Action Party which had 15 seats. Community Action first contested Wigan elections in 2002, and won 18 seats in the 2004 election following the re-warding - their councilors are for wards in the middle of the borough, between Wigan and Leigh. The Conservative Party had nine seats, and the Liberal Democrats eight.

At the 2008 elections Labour was the largest party with 41 seats out of a total of 75; the Conservative Party had 14 seats, Community Action Party eight seats, Independent seven seats, Liberal Democrats four seats, and one was vacant.

In November 2010 (after elections in May), Labour was the largest party with 51 seats out of a total of 75; the Conservative Party had eight seats, Independents seven seats, Community Action Party four seats, Liberal Democrats three seats (one member currently suspended) and two members were 'Independent Conservative'.

As of June 2011 (after May elections), Labour continued to be the largest party with 58 seats out of 75, the Independent Councillor group with 8 seats form the official opposition, the Conservative Party had 5 seats, the Liberal Democrats hold 2 seats, Community Action Party 1 seat and 1 Independent councillor.

In May 2012 (post 2012 Local Elections) the composition of the council was Labour 63 (+5), Others 9 (-1), Liberal Democrats 2 (No change) and Conservatives 1 ( -4).

Presently in May 2018, the Council's political composition is: Labour 60, Conservatives 7, Independent 4, Independent Network 2, Shevington Independents 1, and Standish Independents 1.

The council uses Wigan Town Hall as its main headquarters. Leigh Town Hall is used as a secondary base.

=== Localities and wards ===
Map of Wigan Metropolitan Borough's electoral wards.

The borough is divided into 25 electoral wards, each of which elect three councillors. The present wards were adopted in 2023, following a review by the Boundary Commission, the previous review took place in 2003. Prior to 2003 the borough was divided in 24 wards. From the 2003 Boundary Review until the 2020s, Wigan Council divided the borough into ten areas by the name of townships, each with a Township Manager (council liaison) and a regularly scheduled Township Forum meeting. However with Austerity cuts This has been replaced with an ad hoc community consultation structure without regularly scheduled community forums or permanent council liaisons consisting of 16 communities or 'Places' divided into 3 unnamed 'Localities', the Locality at the centre of the Borough consists of Ashton, Bryn, Abram, Platt Bridge, Hindley and Hindley Green with all areas to the northwest forming a locality centred on Wigan and all areas to the southwest forming one centred on Leigh. However two Town Centre Managers were appointed in Wigan and Leigh primarily to act as liaisons between the Council and local business.

Former Township	Wards
Ashton-in-Makerfield / Bryn	Bryn with Ashton-in-Makerfield North; Ashton-in-Makerfield South
Atherton	Atherton North; Atherton South with Lilford
Hindley / Abram	Abram; Hindley; Hindley Green
Leigh	Leigh Central & Higher Folds; Leigh North; Leigh South; Leigh West
Lowton / Golborne	Golborne and Lowton West; Lowton East
Orrell / Higher End / Winstanley	Orrell; Winstanley;
Standish / Aspull / Shevington	Aspull, New Springs & Whelley; Shevington with Lower Ground & Moor; Standish with Langtree
Tyldesley / Astley	Astley; Tyldesley & Mosley Common
Wigan North	Ince; Wigan Central; Wigan West
Wigan South	Douglas; Pemberton; Worsley Mesnes

=== Civil & ecclesiastical parishes ===
The borough has three civil parishes: Haigh, Shevington and Worthington. The rest of the borough is an unparished area. Church of England ecclesiastical parishes in the west of the borough are part of the Diocese of Liverpool, those in the east of the Metropolitan Borough are part of the Diocese of Manchester and the northern section part of the Diocese of Blackburn.

=== Parliamentary ===
The Wigan Metropolitan Borough is currently covered by four parliamentary constituencies, Wigan, Makerfield, Leigh & Atherton, and Worsley & Eccles.

=== Coat of arms ===
Wigan council's new coat of arms is based on various elements from the arms of the councils of its predecessor districts.

== Demography ==
Population pyramid of Wigan in 2020

With a population of around 300,000, Wigan is the second most populous borough of Greater Manchester, after Manchester. It has one of the lowest ethnic minority populations, with the 2001 census reporting 98.7% of the population as white. Unemployment is around the average for England and Wales. Approximately 9.5% of the population was recorded as being permanently sick or disabled compared to a national average of 5.5%.

=== Population change ===
The table details the population change since 1801, including the percentage change since the last available census data. Although the Metropolitan Borough of Wigan has existed since 1974, figures have been generated by combining data from the towns, villages, and civil parishes that became constituent parts of the borough.

Population growth in Wigan since 1801
Year	1801	1811	1821	1831	1841	1851	1861	1871	1881	1891			
Population	41,413	50,464	60,760	69,400	78,349	93,271	120,001	146,732	173,462	212,665			
% change	–	+21.9	+20.4	+14.2	+12.9	+19.0	+28.7	+22.3	+18.2	+22.6			
Year	1901	1911	1921	1931	1941	1951	1961	1971	1981	1991	2001	2011	2021
Population	239,399	269,503	267,754	266,040	266,436	266,839	284,309	302,929	307,721	310,866	301,415	317,849	329,321
% change	+12.6	+12.6	−0.6	−0.6	+0.1	+0.2	+6.5	+6.5	+1.6	+1.0	−3.0	+5.4	+3.6
Source: Office of National Statistics & Vision of Britain

The population of the borough has remained roughly static from the 1970s through to the start of the millennium at around 300,000 but has risen over 10% since reaching an estimated 339,174 in mid 2023, it is the second most populous borough within Greater Manchester after Manchester itself.

The ONS identify the Wigan Built-up Area as the western part of the district, as well as Skelmersdale and Upholland in West Lancashire, with a population of 175,485 in 2011.

It considers towns in the east of the borough, Hindley, Leigh, Golborne, Atherton and Tyldesley to be part of the Greater Manchester Built-up Area.

Aspull and Shevington are identified as standalone urban areas and Ashton-in-Makerfield is considered to be part of the Liverpool Built-up area, sitting at the border with St Helen’s. The entirety of the Wigan borough forms part of the Manchester Larger Urban Zone.

=== Ethnicity ===
Ethnic Group	Year							
Ethnic Group	1991		2001		2011		2021	
Ethnic Group	Number	%	Number	%	Number	%	Number	%
White: Total	304,112	99.2%	297,506	98.7%	309,193	97.3%	312,952	95.0
White: British	–	–	294,149	97.6%	303,519	95.5%	302,482	91.8
White: Irish			1,744		1,459	0.5	1,353	0.4
White: Gypsy or Irish Traveller	–	–			151	<0.1	247	0.1
White: Roma	–	–					291	0.1
White: Other	–	–	1,613		4,064	1.3	8,579	2.6
Asian or Asian British: Total	1,477	0.5%	1,814	0.6%	3,519	1.1%	5,826	1.8
Asian or Asian British: Indian	499		681		1,019	0.3	1,532	0.5
Asian or Asian British: Pakistani	303		400		676	0.2	1,342	0.4
Asian or Asian British: Bangladeshi	46		72		109	<0.1	156	<0.1
Asian or Asian British: Chinese	494		488		891	0.3	1,234	0.4
Asian or Asian British: Other Asian	135		173		824	0.3	1,562	0.5
Black or Black British: Total	495	0.1%	539	0.2%	1,678	0.5%	3,907	1.2
Black or Black British: African	148		302		1,310	0.4	3,081	0.9
Black or Black British: Caribbean	132		194		216	0.1	331	0.1
Black or Black British: Other Black	215		43		152	0.1	495	0.2
Mixed or British Mixed: Total	–	–	1,298	0.4%	2,756	0.9%	4,353	1.3
Mixed: White and Black Caribbean	–	–	416		1,015	0.3	1,148	0.3
Mixed: White and Black African	–	–	199		429	0.1	885	0.3
Mixed: White and Asian	–	–	387		783	0.2	1,293	0.4
Mixed: Other Mixed	–	–	296		529	0.2	1,027	0.3
Other: Total	437	0.1%	258	–	703	0.2%	2,292	0.7
Other: Arab	–	–	–	–	304	0.1	711	0.2
Other: Any other ethnic group	437	–	258	–	399	0.1	1,581	0.5
Total	306,521	100%	301,415	100%	317,849	100%	329,330	100%

Religion	2021	
Religion	Number	%
Christian	206,870	62.8
Muslim	4,155	1.3
Jewish	84	<0.1
Hindu	995	0.3
Sikh	122	<0.1
Buddhism	831	0.3
Other religion	1,099	0.3
No religion	99,784	30.3
Religion not stated	15,390	4.7
Total	329,300	100.0

== Transport ==
Public transport in Wigan MBC is co-ordinated by Transport for Greater Manchester (TfGM).

The borough is served by an extensive bus network with most services operated by Stagecoach Manchester, Arriva North West First Greater Manchester and Diamond North West. There are two major bus stations in both Wigan and Leigh town centres. Services operate from the bus stations to Bolton, Manchester, the Trafford Centre, St Helens and Chorley, as well as local inter-urban routes, with three high frequency services between Wigan and Leigh bus stations, operated by Stagecoach Manchester. Leigh, Atherton and Tyldesley are also served by the high frequency Vantage services, via a guided busway, connecting the towns to Central Manchester in 30-40 minutes outside of peaks.

Several railway lines cross the borough. Wigan Wallgate railway station is served by Northern trains on the Manchester to Southport and Kirkby lines. There are services to stations towards Manchester, serving all city centre stations including Manchester Victoria and Manchester Piccadilly via two routes: one through Bolton and one via Atherton, with connections to other local and national destinations. Wigan North Western railway station is on the West Coast Main Line served by Northern and Avanti West Coast. There are services to Liverpool Lime Street, Blackpool North, London Euston, Birmingham, Glasgow and Edinburgh. Other stations in the borough are Atherton, Hag Fold, Bryn, Gathurst, Hindley, Ince, Orrell, and Pemberton. Appley Bridge railway station just outside the border with West Lancashire is managed by TfGM and serves the far north-western part of the borough. There is a campaign for Golborne railway station and Kenyon Junction station to be re-opened. The Liverpool-Manchester line (Chat Moss route) crosses the far south of the borough but has no railway station since the 60's after Kenyon Junction railway station, Astley railway station, Lamb's Cottage railway station, Flow Moss railway station and Glazebury and Bury Lane railway station closed.

Leigh is one of the largest towns in the UK without a railway station. Westleigh station, on the Bolton and Leigh Railway, closed in 1954. Leigh and Tyldesley stations on the Tyldesley Loopline were closed in 1969.

The Leeds and Liverpool and Bridgewater canals meet in Leigh town centre. The M6 motorway crosses the west of the borough, and serves Ashton-in-Makerfield at junctions 23 and 24 (north only) and 25 (south only), Wigan at junction 25 (south only), Wigan/Orrell at junction 26 and Standish junction 27. The M58 motorway, to Liverpool, terminates at junction 26 of the M6 near Orrell. The dual carriageway A580 East Lancashire Road linking Liverpool to Manchester crosses the south of the borough. The A579 runs from Bolton to the M6 via Atherleigh Way, which runs from the west of Atherton, bypassing Leigh town centre to reach the East Lancashire Road at the Warrington border.

== Twinning ==
The Metropolitan Borough of Wigan has one twin town in France – Angers in the Pays de la Loire. The arrangement was established in 1988.

== Freedom of the Borough ==
The following people and military units have received the Freedom of the Borough of Wigan.

=== Individuals ===
- James Lindsay, 26th Earl of Crawford: January 1900.
- Sir William Gorman: 1954.
- David Whelan: 30 August 2007.
- Peter Smith, Baron Smith of Leigh: 7 December 2011.

=== Military units ===
- D Squadron (TA Reserve) Royal Mercian and Lancastrian Yeomanry: 27 February 2008.
- The Duke of Lancaster's Regiment: 2 December 2019.
