= Barton Moss railway station =

Former railway station in Peel Green, Lancashire, England

Barton Moss

General information
- Location: Peel Green, Salford; England
- Coordinates: 53.4778°N 2.4047°W
- Grid reference: SJ732980
- Platforms: 2

Other information
- Status: Disused

History
- Original company: Liverpool and Manchester Railway
- Pre-grouping: London and North Western Railway
- Post-grouping: London, Midland and Scottish Railway

Key dates
- 1832: Station opened
- 1 May 1862: Station resited
- 23 September 1929: Station closed
Location

Barton Moss railway station was in Peel Green, Lancashire, England.

== History ==
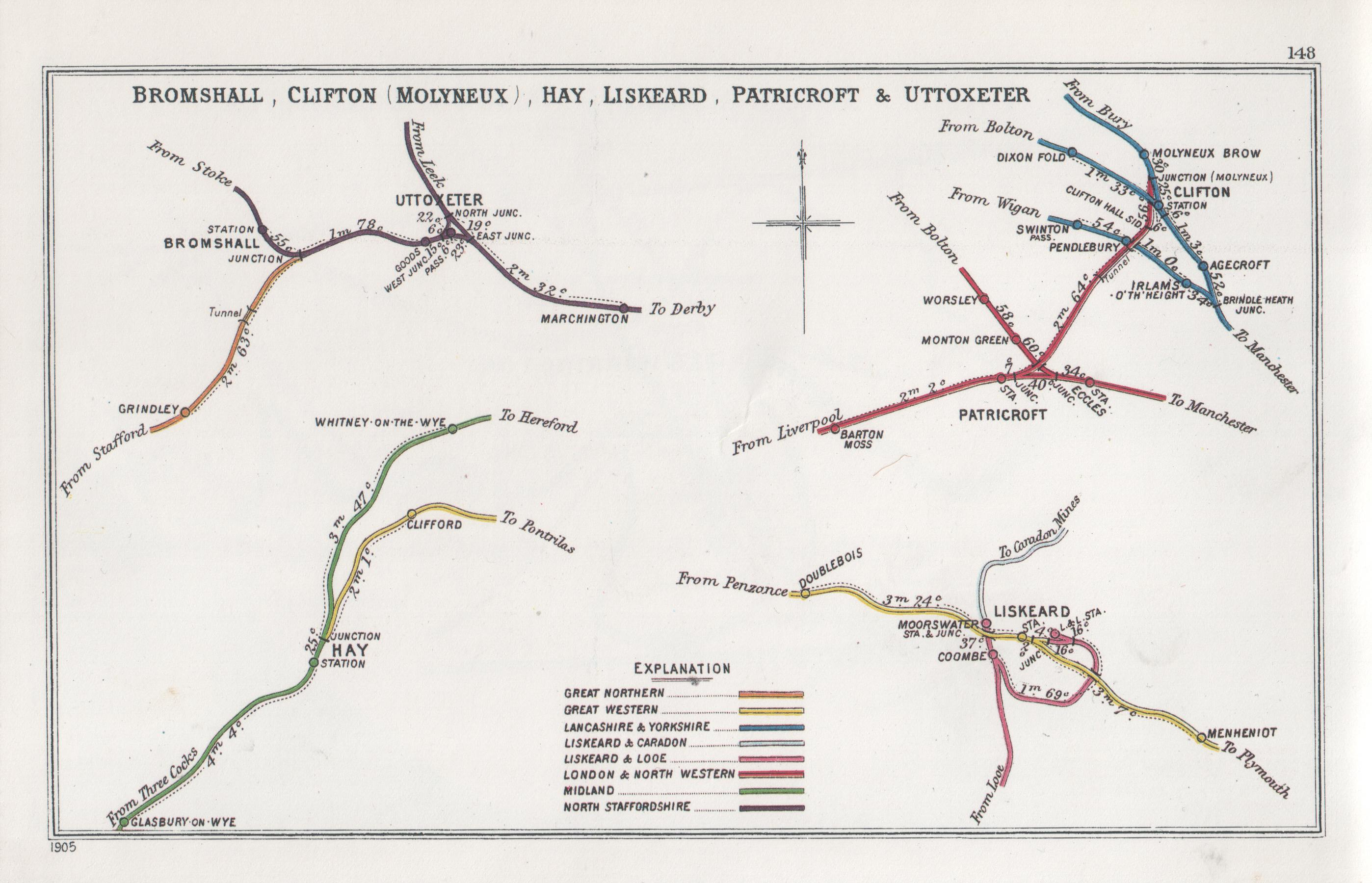
A 1905 Railway Clearing House Junction Diagram showing (upper right) railways in the vicinity of Barton Moss

The original Liverpool and Manchester Railway station at Barton Moss opened in 1832 and was replaced on 1 May 1862 by a new one 1.205 kilometres (0.749 mi) due east.

This second station was opened by the London and North Western Railway; it duly passed to the London, Midland and Scottish Railway (LMS) at the 1923 Grouping.

The LMS closed the station on 23 September 1929.

Preceding station	Historical railways	Following station
Lamb's Cottage; Line open, station closed	LNWR	Patricroft; Line and station open
