= Charles Lawrence (merchant) =

Charles Lawrence (1776–1853) was a Liverpool merchant who served as Mayor of Liverpool in 1823–24. He is primarily remembered as Chairman of the Liverpool & Manchester Railway which opened in 1830.

== Early life ==
Charles Lawrence was born in 1776 in Albemarle Street, London. He was the son of Richard James Lawrence and his wife Mary (b. Hall). In 1800, he married Rose D'Aguilar, poet and friend of Felicia Hemans.

== Business ==
The Lawrence family had business interests in the West Indies. It owned the Fairfield Estate in St James, Jamaica which produced variously coffee, sugar, molasses, rum and cattle. In 1830, Charles Lawrence part-inherited 199 slaves from the estate when his father died shortly before the abolition of slavery. He shared compensation with his mother when the slaves were freed. His activities as merchant were conducted from premises in Bridgewater Street, Liverpool, trading as Charles Lawrence & Son, the latter being George Hall Lawrence.

== Politics ==
Charles Lawrence had Whig political sympathies at the time he was elected Mayor of Liverpool for 1823–4.

== Railway interests ==
Lawrence was pivotal in the development of the Liverpool & Manchester Railway along with others in Liverpool such as Joseph Sandars, Henry Booth and John Moss. Once the Act of Parliament authorised construction, he took over as chairman from John Moss and saw the project through to 1845 when the company merged with the Grand Junction Railway. He also served as Deputy Chairman of the Grand Junction Railway and invested in a number of other railway projects.

== Family ==
The Lawrence family lived first at Wavertree Hall close to Wavertree Lane railway station. In 1843, the land was acquired by the corporation and ultimately formed the basis of Wavertree Park. Around 1839, the Lawrences moved to Carnatic Hall, Mossley Hill (the hall was destroyed by fire in 1891) where in 1847, they entertained Prime Minister Robert Peel during his visit to Liverpool to unveil Gibson's statue of William Huskisson MP in front of the new Custom House (Huskisson had died due to an accident on the opening day of the Liverpool & Manchester railway). One of his three sons, George Hall Lawrence, was Mayor of Liverpool at this time.

Charles Lawrence died in 1853.
