= Cross Lane railway station =

Former railway station in England

Coordinates: 53.4800°N 2.2823°W

Cross Lane

General information
- Location: Salford, Salford; England
- Grid reference: SJ813981
- Platforms: 4

Other information
- Status: Disused

History
- Original company: Liverpool and Manchester Railway
- Pre-grouping: London and North Western Railway
- Post-grouping: London, Midland and Scottish Railway

Key dates
- 15 September 1830: Opened as Cross Lane Bridge
- c. 1831: Renamed Cross Lane
- 20 July 1959: Station closed for passengers
- 1 January 1963: closed completely
Location

Cross Lane railway station is a closed station on the Liverpool to Manchester line which was located on Cross Lane, Salford. It was one of the original stations on the Liverpool and Manchester Railway when it opened to traffic in September 1830, though initial facilities were very basic. It was later rebuilt by the L&MR's successor, the London and North Western Railway in more substantial fashion and by the end of the 19th century had platform faces on all four lines that passed through.

British Railways closed the station to passenger traffic in July 1959 and to goods in January 1963. It was subsequently demolished and no trace now remains – much of the former site is now occupied by the M602 motorway, though the original L&M line (now double track once more and electrified since 2013) still passes through on its way west towards Eccles and Liverpool Lime Street.

Preceding station	Disused railways	Following station
Seedley	LNW	Ordsall Lane
