= Flow Moss railway station =

Former railway station in England

Flow Moss

General information
- Location: Astley Green, Wigan; England
- Coordinates: 53.4697°N 2.4672°W
- Grid reference: SJ690970
- Platforms: 2 (probably)

Other information
- Status: Disused

History
- Original company: Liverpool and Manchester Railway

Key dates
- 15 September 1830: Station opened as "Flow Moss"
- October 1842: Station closed
- about 1844: New station on a different location to the east opened as "Flow Moss Cottage", then renamed "Astley"
Location

Flow Moss was a short-lived, original railway station on the Liverpool and Manchester Railway south of Astley village in what was then the county of Lancashire, England.

== Location ==
This station's exact location station is difficult to establish because after it closed in 1842 a second station, named Flow Moss Cottage was opened around 1844, which is exactly the time period when Astley station was said to have opened. Sources are sometimes self-contradictory about which station is which and other times silent. The water is muddied still further by Butt's bare statement that Flow Moss Cottage was simply renamed "Astley" implying no change of location.

Flow Moss's location is clear, as it appears on the OS map surveyed in 1844 and published in 1848. Astley station also appears on the adjacent map some distance to the east,

There is no trace of Flow Moss Cottage on the 1888 OS map. No station or other lineside structure named simply "Flow Moss" appears on either the 1848 or the 1888 map, though on the 1848 map the geographical feature "Flow Moss" is prominently labelled immediately north of Flow Moss Cottage.

One source, writing with local knowledge but over a century later, places "Flow Moss" station between Flow Moss Cottage and Astley station, where Borron's Tramway met the Liverpool and Manchester line at right angles. This meeting point is readily identifiable at the extreme right of the 1848 OS map, but it gives no hint of any structure there, in use or otherwise. It can readily be seen that the meeting point had evolved by 1888 to a roadway or track running adjacent to the south side of the Liverpool and Manchester line eastwards to Astley station.

== Tramways ==
The station was in the general area of Chat Moss which was then very sparsely populated. It remained sparsely populated in 2015. A narrow gauge tramway can be seen on the 1848 map running north north west from the oxbow curve at Sandy Warps on the River Mersey, terminating at Flow Moss as described above. This tramway was part of an early scheme to bring in first Marl, then later manure and human excrement to "improve" the Moss. Later schemes greatly expanded this enterprise, which had the intended effect of turning land from unproductive to very fertile.

As well as the substantial tramways referred to above, two much smaller concerns straddled the Flow Moss stations' sites from the 1880s. These can be clearly seen on the 1888 map overlay, running northeast and southeast from sidings immediately east of Glazebury station, with the British Moss Litter Works being prominent. These minor lines, which among other things used Salford's night soil as opposed to Manchester's which was used by their larger neighbours, are described on pages 6 and 7 of The Narrow Gauge Railway Society's magazine "The Narrow Gauge" Volume NG93.

== Modern times ==
By 2015 no trace of either Flow Moss station survived. The Stephensons' masterpiece had been electrified and provided a service in their spirit.

Preceding station	Disused railways	Following station
Glazebury and Bury Lane; Line open, station closed	Liverpool and Manchester Railway	Astley; Line open, station closed
