= Lamb's Cottage railway station =

Former railway station in England

Lamb's Cottage

General information
- Location: Astley Green, Wigan; England
- Coordinates: 53.4718°N 2.4385°W
- Grid reference: SJ710973
- Platforms: 2 (probably)

Other information
- Status: Disused

History
- Original company: Liverpool and Manchester Railway

Key dates
- 15 September 1830: Station opened
- October 1842: Station closed
Location

Lamb's Cottage was a short-lived, original railway station on the Liverpool and Manchester Railway to the southeast of Astley village in what was then the county of Lancashire, England. The station was 32 chains (0.64 km) east of what later became Astley station and in 2015 was Astley signal box and level crossing carrying Rindle Road.

== History ==
Lamb's Cottage shows on the OS map surveyed in 1845 and published in 1848 at the point where a footpath running NW to SE crosses the railway. The footpath remained in place in 2015.

The station was in the general area of Chat Moss, which was then very sparsely populated. It remained sparsely populated in 2015. A narrow gauge tramway can be seen on the 1848 map running north- northwest from the River Irwell at Boysnope, terminating at Lamb's Cottage station's eastern neighbour, Barton Moss (1st) station, shown on the map as "Barton Station". This tramway was part of an early scheme to bring in manure and human excrement to "improve" the Moss. Later schemes greatly expanded this enterprise, which had the intended effect of turning land from unproductive to very fertile.

In 1908 work started to sink Astley Green Colliery and to build a line southwards to the Liverpool to Manchester line to take its coal to customers. This involved using Stephenson's method of floating the ballast and tracks on wood and brush. The line was completed by 1914, making a triangular junction on Lamb's Cottage's station site, obliterating what little evidence remained. That line and junction continued in use until 1970 and has since been lifted.

== Modern times ==
By 2015, no trace of the station survived. The Stephensons' masterpiece had been electrified and provided a service in their spirit.

Preceding station	Disused railways	Following station
Astley; Line open, station closed	Liverpool and Manchester Railway	Barton Moss; Line open, station closed
