= Wavertree Lane railway station =

Former railway station in England

Wavertree Lane

General information
- Location: Edge Hill, Liverpool; England
- Coordinates: 53.403299°N 2.939493°W
- Platforms: 2

Other information
- Status: Disused

History
- Original company: Liverpool and Manchester Railway

Key dates
- 1830: Opened
- 1836: Closed
Location

Wavertree Lane was one of the original stopping-places on the Liverpool & Manchester Railway which opened in 1830. Stopping-places were commonly located at supervised level crossings where gatekeepers were available to signal trains to stop close to the point at which the line crossed the road, in this case Wavertree Lane (now Wavertree Road). The stopping-places were generally primitive in nature without platform or shelter for passengers. Wavertree Lane appeared in the first official list of stopping-places issued in February 1831. The list was probably issued to reduce the number of informal intermediate stops requested by passengers. In the early days only second class trains made such request stops although mixed class trains were introduced subsequently.

The stopping-place was close to Wavertree Hall, residence of Mr Charles Lawrence, chairman of the railway company. A short length of track was laid in the vicinity in Summer 1827, very early in construction of the line, presumably for demonstration and public relations purposes. However, the cuttings to the east and west appear to have been incomplete at the time of Thomas Telford's report in early 1829. On 14 June 1830 the locomotive Arrow took a train carrying directors of the company to Manchester. On the return the train terminated at Wavertree where they were given dinner at Wavertree Hall.

The station was probably one of the first to have a company-owned building with a cottage across the road for the gatekeeper.

The station closed to passengers in 1836 with the opening of the tunnel to Lime Street station from Edge Hill station (the latter was initially referred to in planning documents as New Wavertree Lane station). Ultimately the level crossing was replaced by a bridge and the area occupied by the station subsumed into industrial and railway development associated with the Edge Hill goods marshalling yards.

Preceding station	Disused railways	Following station
Edge Hill	Liverpool and Manchester Railway	Broad Green
