= Weaste railway station =

Former railway station in England

Weaste

General information
- Location: Salford City Council; England
- Coordinates: 53.4835°N 2.3096°W
- Platforms: 4

Other information
- Status: Disused

History
- Original company: Liverpool and Manchester Railway
- Pre-grouping: London and North Western Railway
- Post-grouping: London, Midland and Scottish Railway

Key dates
- c.1831: Opened as Gortons Buildings
- 1856: Renamed Weaste
- 2 April 1883: Opened for goods
- 19 October 1942: Closed to passengers
- 1 November 1947: Closed for goods
Location

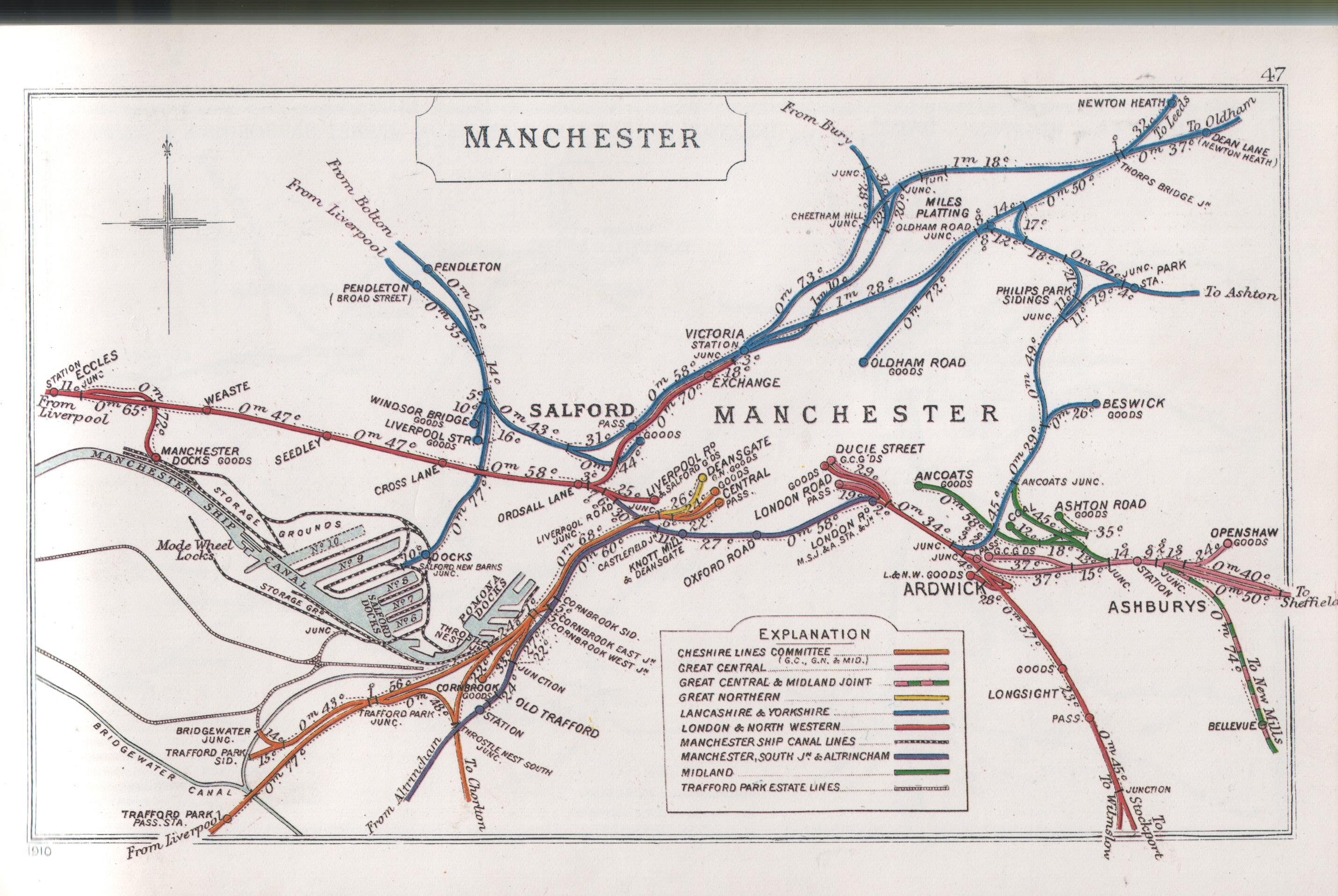
Manchester area pre-grouping, Weaste is centre left

Weaste railway station is a closed station on the Liverpool to Manchester line located between Seedley and Eccles in Salford.

The line opened on 17 September 1830 but there is little detail of early stops or stations, early intermediate stations were little more than halts, usually where the railway was crossed by a road or turnpike.

The station opened about 1831 or 1832 as Gortons Buildings, it is not known how long it was open for under this name, or if it was only open intermittently. The stop was not mentioned in the companies February 1831 list of stopping places but it is mentioned as existing in 1831 by Thomas (1980).

Gortons Buildings are shown on the OS 1848 six-inch map to the south of the line, on the Eccles Turnpike between Warrington and Manchester, Weaste Lane Station is shown to the north at the end of Weaste Lane, adjacent to Victoria Cotton Mill, no platforms are shown on the map. Weaste Road did not exist at this time.

In these early days the station was variously known as Gortons Buildings, Waste Lane, Weaste Lane and Weaste Lane Gate, it was called Waste Lane by Drake in his 1837 Road Book and Weaste Lane in the 1839 and 1850 Bradshaws.

By 1856 it had settled down and was known from then as Weaste.

By 1893 the running lines had been quadrupled with Weaste Road crossing the railway on an overbridge about 500 feet (150 m) west of the end of Weaste Lane, the area of the original station having become a goods yard. The station started to take goods traffic from 2 April 1883. Weaste station was now mostly located to the west of Weaste Road, with three platforms extending back under the overbridge. There was a central platform with running lines on both sides and outer platforms with one face to the railway. The station building was at road level with three stairways leading down to the platforms.

It closed to passengers on 19 October 1942 and to freight on 1 November 1947.

The line is still open but no trace of the station remains with the buildings having been removed and site obliterated by the building of the M602 motorway.

Preceding station	Disused railways	Following station
Eccles	LNWR	Seedley
