= Seedley railway station =

Former railway station in England

Seedley

General information
- Location: Seedley, Salford City Council; England
- Coordinates: 53.481052°N 2.296809°W
- Platforms: 4

Other information
- Status: Disused

History
- Opened: 1 May 1882
- Closed: 2 January 1956
- Original company: London and North Western Railway
- Pre-grouping: London and North Western Railway
- Post-grouping: London Midland and Scottish Railway
Location

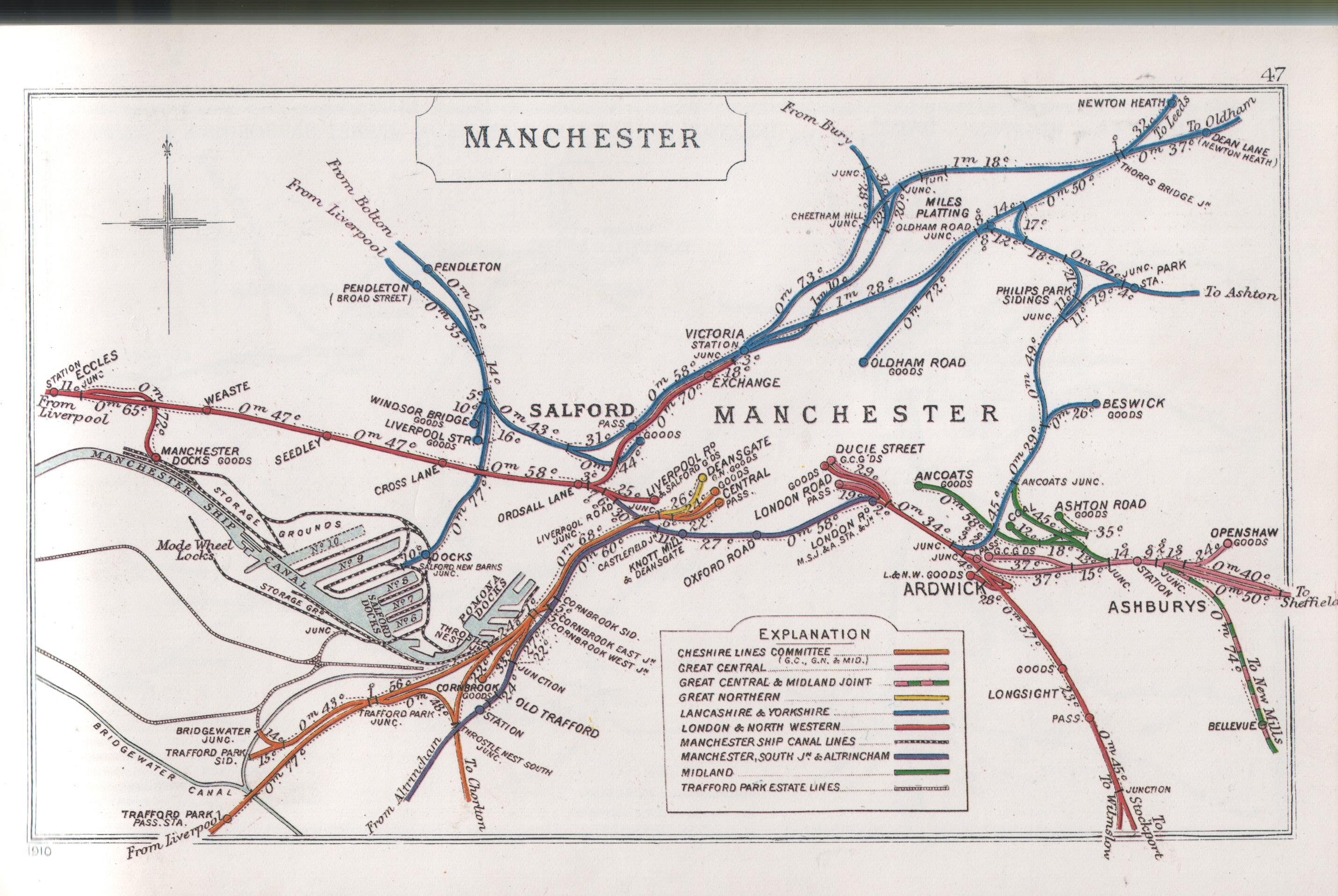
Manchester area pre-grouping, Seedley is centre left

Seedley railway station is a disused station located in the Seedley area of Salford, on the former Liverpool and Manchester Railway.

The station was opened by the London and North Western Railway on 1 May 1882. It was located where Langworthy Road crossed the railway on an overbridge. The station building was at road level with a footbridge running parallel to the road and three sets of stairs going down to the three platforms. The platforms were all to the west of the road, there was a central platform with running lines on both sides and outer platforms with one face to the railway. The northernmost platform had a signal box located half way along it.

The station had no goods facilities, only handling passengers and parcels, it closed on 2 January 1956.

The line is still open. Parts of the station wall can still be seen but part of the trackbed has been covered over following the construction of the M602 motorway.

Preceding station	Disused railways	Following station
Weaste	London and North Western Railway	Cross Lane
