= Seedley =

Coordinates: 53.4920°N 2.2931°W

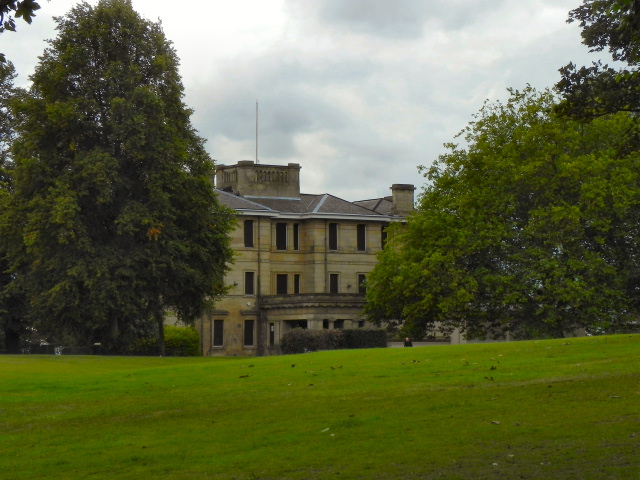
- Buile Hill Mansion in Seedley

- Location within Greater Manchester
- OS grid reference: SJ805995
- Metropolitan borough: Salford
- Metropolitan county: Greater Manchester
- Region: North West
- Country: England
- Sovereign state: United Kingdom
- Post town: SALFORD
- Postcode district: M5–M6
- Dialling code: 0161
- Police: Greater Manchester
- Fire: Greater Manchester
- Ambulance: North West
- UK Parliament: Salford

Seedley is an inner city suburb of Salford, Greater Manchester, England.

== Governance ==
The electoral ward of Weaste & Seedley is represented in Westminster by Rebecca Long-Bailey MP for Salford.

The ward is represented on Salford City Council by three Labour councillors: Ronnie Wilson, Paul Wilson, and Stephen Hesling.

== Amenities ==
Buile Hill Park is a large park in Seedley.

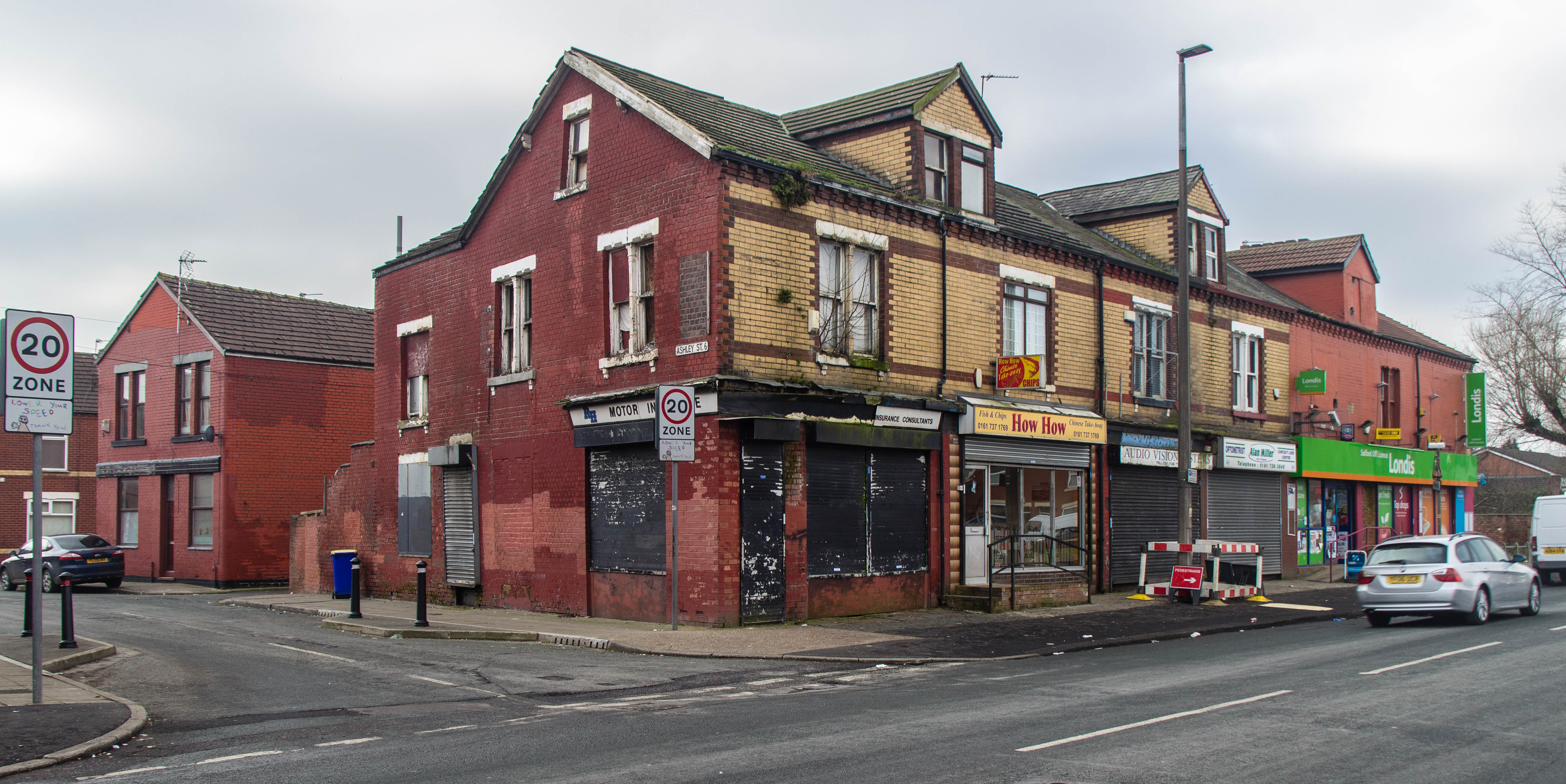
Liverpool Street, Seedley, in 2015

== History ==
Seedley was previously part of the County Borough of Salford in the administrative county of Lancashire.

=== Housing and Regeneration ===
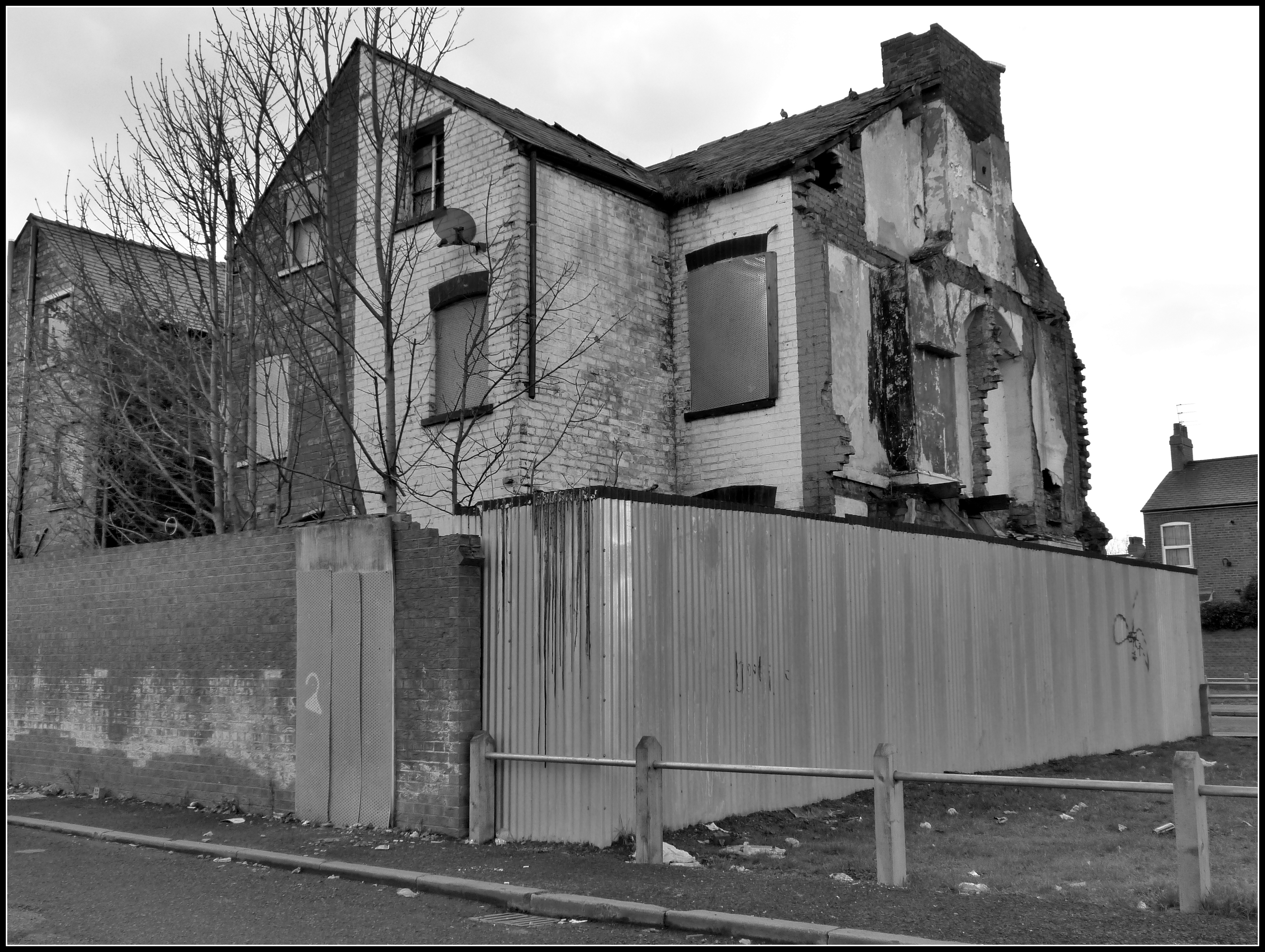
House on Kara Street, Seedley, in 2012

The area is mostly made up of terraced housing, dating from the late 19th century and early 20th century. Seedley experienced long-term population decline in the 1990s with high levels of crime and poverty and empty in the area. Owners were unable to sell their houses and many remained empty, often subject to arson and vandalism. Local government began regeneration plans in 1999 via the Seedley and Langworthy Initiative, an umbrella organisation of local interest groups. These plans continued under the controversial Housing Market Renewal Initiative scheme introduced later by the national government.

=== Former amenities ===
Seedley railway station served the area between 1882 and 1956.

Seedley Baths opened in 1910 and closed in 1978. The building was at the corner of Derby Road and White Street, a junction that no longer exists due to the construction of the M602.

=== Print works and bleach works ===
Seedley was formerly home to Seedley Bleach Works, established by Buckley and Brennand in approximately 1856 or 1887 according to differing sources. It is unclear when the site closed but it was still hiring workers until at least 1917. The works was entered via Nona Street to the north, and was bounded by Nansen Street, running diagonally, to the south.

The Nona Street site was previously the location of Seedley Print Works (calico printing), owned by Robert Goulden, social activist and father of Emmeline Pankhurst. It produced textile design patterns as well as printing, and was registered in censuses from 1845 until at least 1870.

The site predates terraced houses immediately surrounding it, which were in the process of being constructed in 1888.

== Geography ==
Seedley is near Pendleton, Salford and Weaste.

== Transport links ==
Seedley is not served by the Manchester Metrolink or National Rail.

The following bus routes run through the area:

- Route 67 between Manchester and Cadishead (operated by Go North West)
- Route 70 between Pendleton and Eccles (operated by Stagecoach Manchester)
- Circular routes 74 and 75 via Agecroft and Pendleton (operated by Stagecoach Manchester)
- Route 100 between Manchester and Warrington (operated by Go North West)

== Notable residents ==
Alistair Cooke, the broadcaster, lived on Newport Street, and went to the primary school, as did the artist Harold Riley. Emmeline Pankhurst, leader of the British suffragette movement, lived in Seedley.
