= Astley railway station =

Disused railway station in England

Astley
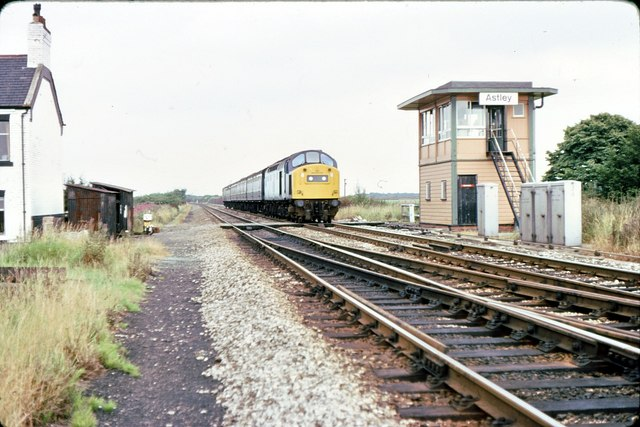
- Astley signalbox and level crossing

General information
- Location: Astley, Wigan; England
- Coordinates: 53.4706°N 2.4502°W
- Grid reference: SJ704973
- Platforms: 2

Other information
- Status: Disused

History
- Original company: Liverpool and Manchester Railway
- Pre-grouping: London and North Western Railway
- Post-grouping: London, Midland and Scottish Railway

Key dates
- about 1844: Station opened
- 7 May 1956: Station closed
Location

Astley was a railway station on the Liverpool and Manchester Railway on Chat Moss to the south of Astley village in what was then the county of Lancashire, England.

== History ==
Opened in the 1840s by the Liverpool and Manchester Railway, the station became part of the Grand Junction Railway on 8 August 1845. The GJR merged to form the London and North Western Railway on 16 July 1846. The LNWR became part of the London Midland and Scottish Railway during the grouping of 1923. The station then passed to the London Midland Region of British Railways on nationalisation in 1948 and was closed by the British Railways Board on 7 May 1956. It was subsequently demolished.

From 1914 to 1970 a triangular junction 32 chains (0.64 km) east of the station linked the mineral line from Astley Green Colliery north of the Bridgewater Canal to the main line.

== The site today ==
Trains on the now electrified, more northerly of the two Liverpool to Manchester Lines still pass through the station site. The buildings have been demolished and a signal box built since the station's closure occupies part of the site. An electrical switching site is being constructed in the vicinity as part of the Manchester - Liverpool (via Earlestown) section of the NW electrification schemes. The level crossing is locked and unlocked by the signaller, but is operated manually by road users.

Preceding station	Disused railways	Following station
Flow Moss	Liverpool and Manchester Railway	Lamb's Cottage
