= Patricroft railway station =

Railway station in Greater Manchester, England

Coordinates: 53.485°N 2.357°W

Patricroft
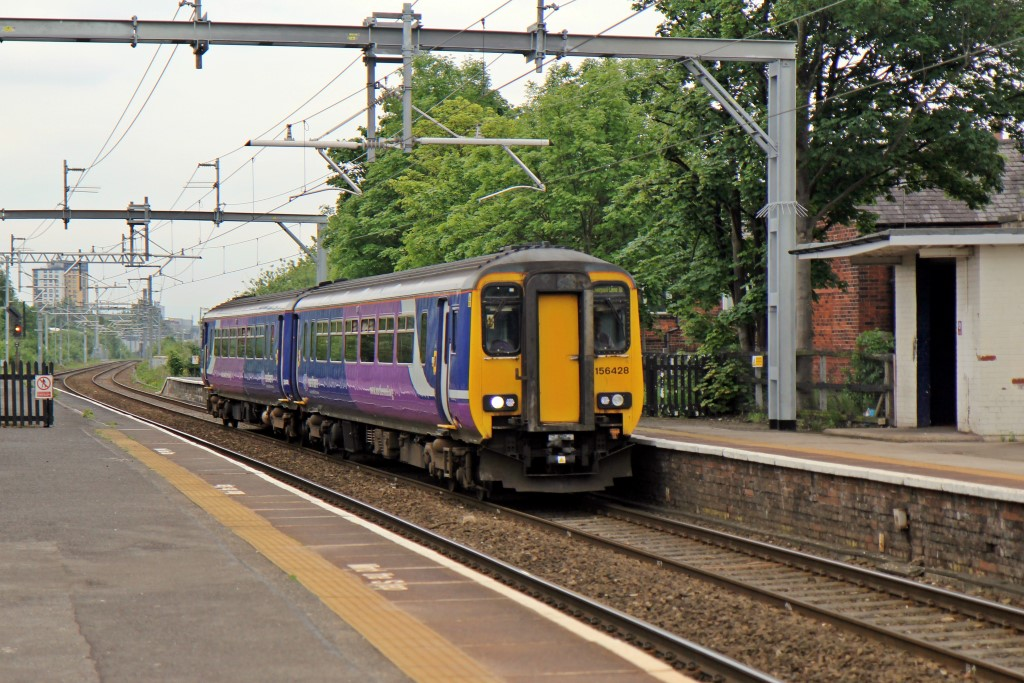
- Patricroft railway station in 2014.

General information
- Location: Patricroft, Salford; England
- Grid reference: SJ763987
- Managed by: Northern Trains
- Transit authority: Greater Manchester
- Platforms: 2

Other information
- Station code: PAT
- Classification: DfT category F2

Passengers
- 2020/21: ▼26,236
- 2021/22: ▲85,766
- 2022/23: ▲0.106 million
- 2023/24: ▲0.129 million
- 2024/25: ▲0.148 million
Location
Notes
- Passenger statistics from the Office of Rail and Road

Patricroft railway station serves Patricroft in Greater Manchester, England. The station is on Green Lane, just north of the junction with Cromwell Road and just east of the Bridgewater Canal. It is situated 5 miles (8.0 km) west of Manchester Victoria on the former Liverpool and Manchester Railway, which was electrified in stages between 2013 and 2015.

== History ==
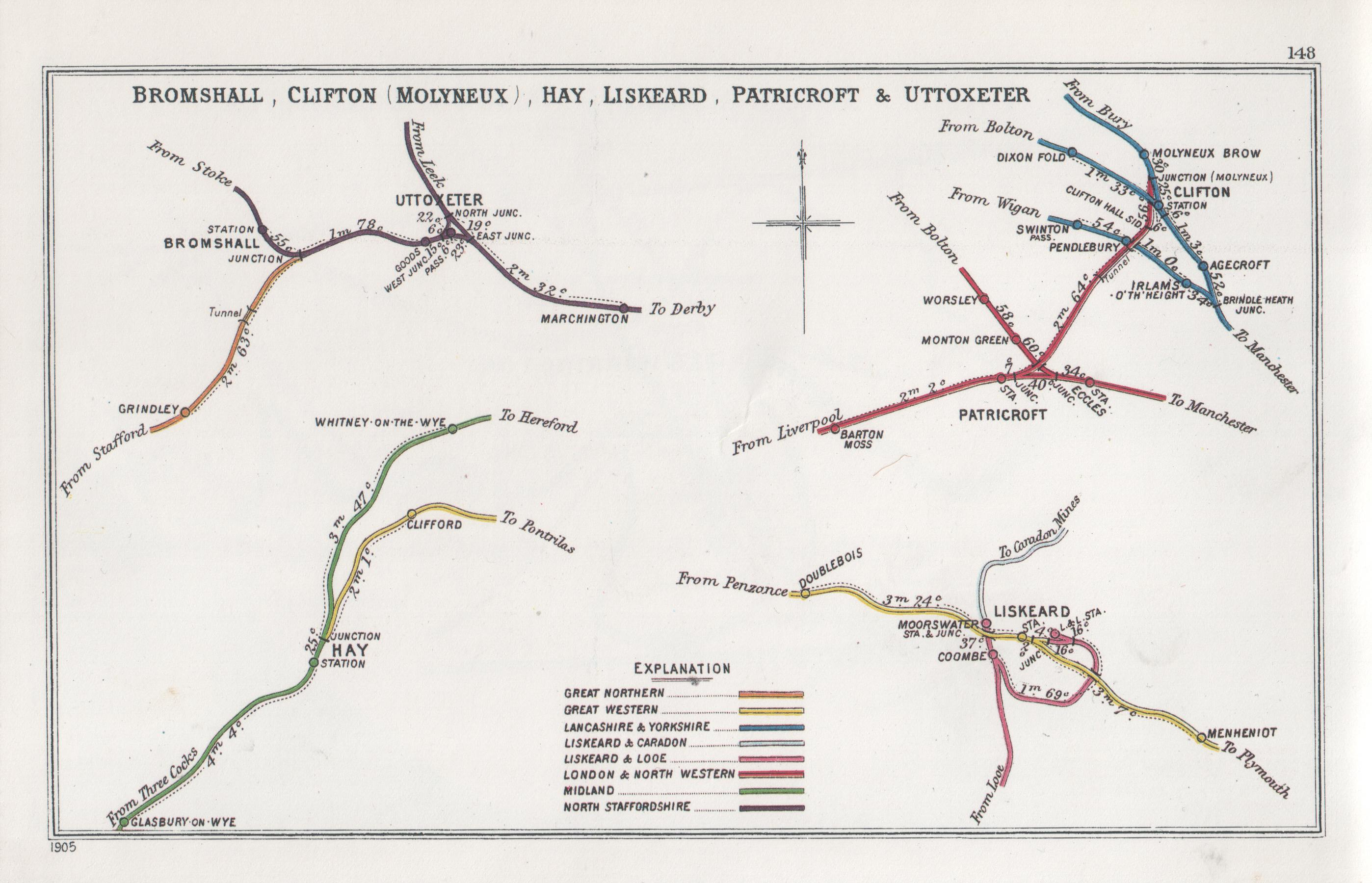
A 1905 Railway Clearing House Junction diagram showing (upper right) railways in the vicinity of Patricroft

The station is situated on the world's first inter-city passenger railway, between Liverpool and Manchester, and is also located close to the world's first commercial canal. The station used to have an adjacent engine shed, Patricroft MPD, which was located to the rear of the Manchester-bound platform on the northern side of the station. The engine shed opened in 1884 and closed in 1968. The majority of the station buildings were demolished in the 1980s, with only a waiting shelter remaining on each platform.

== Facilities ==
The station is unstaffed and has no permanent buildings; it does now though have ticket machines in place to allow passengers to buy tickets (or a permit to travel) prior to boarding. Train running information is provided by telephone, digital PIS screens and timetable posters. The platforms are linked by subway, but neither have step-free access as the subway has stairs from the station entrance to platform level.

== Services ==
Monday to Saturdays there is generally an hourly service from the station to Manchester Piccadilly and Manchester Airport eastbound, and Newton-le-Willows and Liverpool Lime Street westbound. These are operated by the Class 331 and Class 323 EMUs on a stopping service between Liverpool and Manchester. Services to and from Manchester Victoria are now very limited (peak periods and late evenings) since the May 2018 timetable change.

The Sunday service is the same, although trains operate to Wilmslow via Piccadilly and the Airport.

Preceding station	National Rail	Following station
Newton-le-Willows	Northern Trains; Liverpool to Manchester Line	Eccles
	Historical railways	
Barton Moss; Line open, station closed	London and North Western Railway; Liverpool and Manchester Railway	Eccles; Line and station open
