= Glazebury and Bury Lane railway station =

Former railway station in England

Glazebury and Bury Lane

General information
- Location: Culcheth and Glazebury, Warrington; England
- Coordinates: 53.4677°N 2.4943°W
- Grid reference: SJ674969
- Platforms: 2

Other information
- Status: Disused

History
- Original company: Liverpool and Manchester Railway
- Pre-grouping: London and North Western Railway
- Post-grouping: London, Midland and Scottish Railway

Key dates
- 15 September 1830: Station opened as Bury Lane
- July 1878: Station renamed Glazebury and Bury Lane
- 7 July 1958: Station closed
Location

Glazebury and Bury Lane is a closed railway station between Liverpool and Manchester.

The station opened on 15 September 1830 by the Liverpool and Manchester Railway as Bury Lane, being renamed Glazebury and Bury Lane in 1878. The station closed on 7 July 1958.

Preceding station	Disused railways	Following station
Kenyon Junction; Line open, station closed	London and North Western Railway; Liverpool and Manchester Railway	Flow Moss; Line open, station closed
