= George Griffiths (footballer, born 1924) =

English footballer

Personal information
- Full name: George Griffiths
- Date of birth: 23 June 1924
- Place of birth: Earlestown, England
- Date of death: 8 January 2004 (aged 79)
- Place of death: St Helens, England
- Position: Right back

Senior career*
Years	Team	Apps	(Gls)
–1942	Earlestown		
1942–1954	Bury	239	(7)
1954–1958	Halifax Town	166	(14)
- Earlestown

Managerial career
- Earlestown (player-manager)
- * Club domestic league appearances and goals

George Griffiths (23 June 1924 – 8 January 2004) was an English professional footballer who made over 400 appearances as a right back in the Football League for Bury and Halifax Town.
