= Newton-le-Willows =

Town in Merseyside, England

Coordinates: 53.450°N 2.633°W

Newton-le-Willows (Newton)
- Town
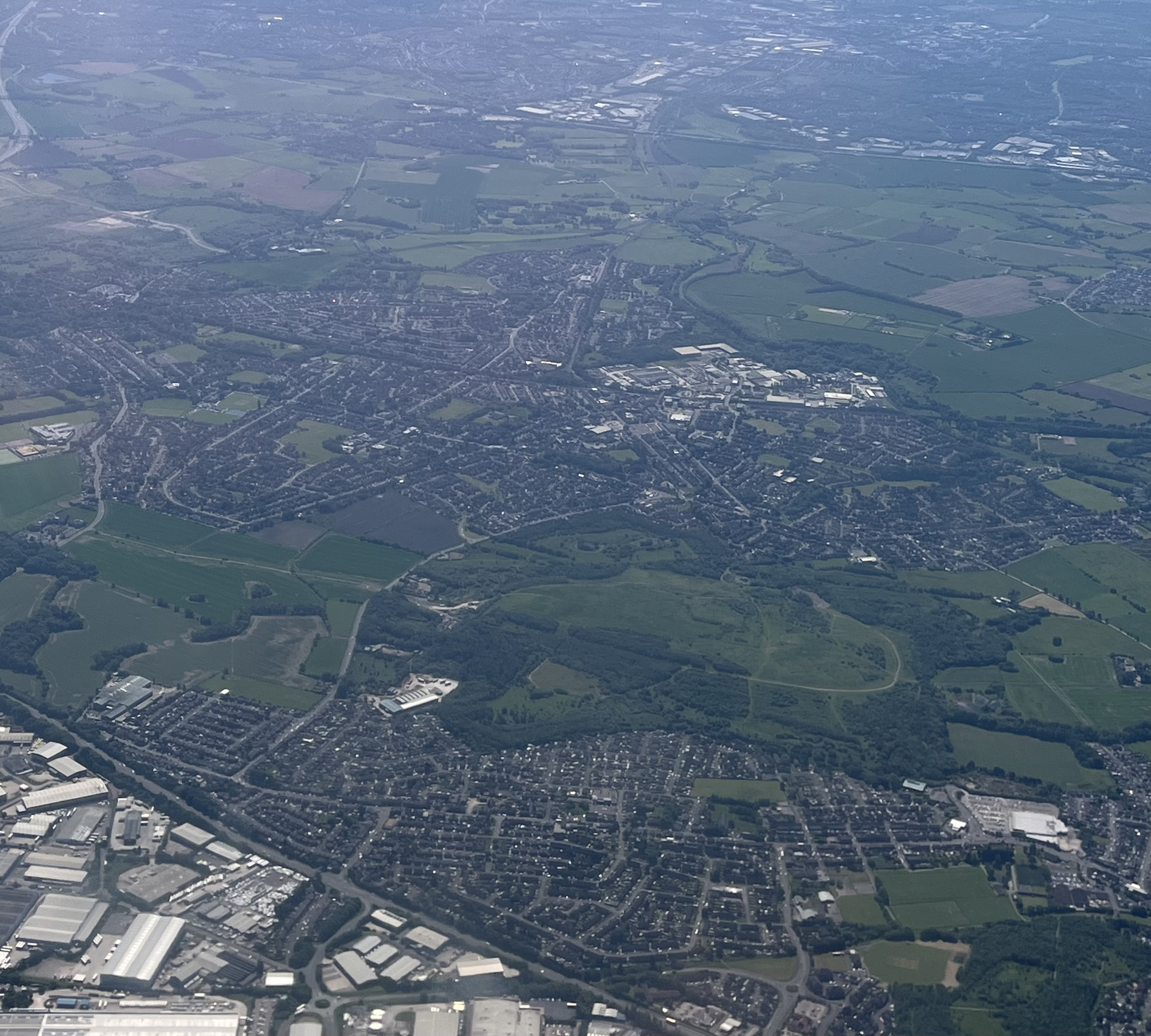
- Aerial view of Newton-le-Willows looking south with Haydock in the foreground and Warrington in the background

- Location within Merseyside
- Population: 24,642 (2021 Census)
- OS grid reference: SJ580949
  - London: 171 mi (275 km) SE
- Metropolitan borough: St Helens
- Metropolitan county: Merseyside
- Region: North West
- Country: England
- Sovereign state: United Kingdom
- Post town: NEWTON-LE-WILLOWS
- Postcode district: WA12
- Dialling code: 01925
- Police: Merseyside
- Fire: Merseyside
- Ambulance: North West
- UK Parliament: St Helens North

Newton-le-Willows, often shortened informally to Newton, is a market town in the Metropolitan Borough of St Helens, Merseyside, England. The population at the 2021 census was 24,642. Newton-le-Willows is on the eastern edge of St Helens, south of Wigan and north of Warrington, equidistant to Liverpool and Manchester.

Within the boundaries of the historic county of Lancashire, the Newton township was historically largely pastoral lands, with the mining industry encroaching from the north and the west as time went on. The township (often referred to as Newton in Makerfield at that time) is documented since at least the 12th century. In the early 19th century the township saw significant urban development to support the construction of the Liverpool and Manchester Railway. The presence of the Sankey Canal running through the Sankey Valley necessitated the construction of the Sankey Viaduct by George Stephenson, and the town of Earlestown developed around the industrial works there. Earlestown gradually became the administrative and commercial centre of the township, with the historic market and fairs moving to a purpose built square.

== Name ==
Historically, Newton was known as both "Newton-le-Willows" and "Newton in Makerfield" to differentiate it from other towns of the same name. The name Newton means "new town", while Makerfield is an ancient name for the district from the Brittonic word "mager" meaning "wall" combined with the English word "field". "Neweton" was mentioned in the Domesday Book while the spelling of Makerfield evolved and was recorded as Makeresfeld in 1205 and 1351, as Makefeld in 1206, Makerefeld in 1213 and Makerfield since 1242.

== History ==
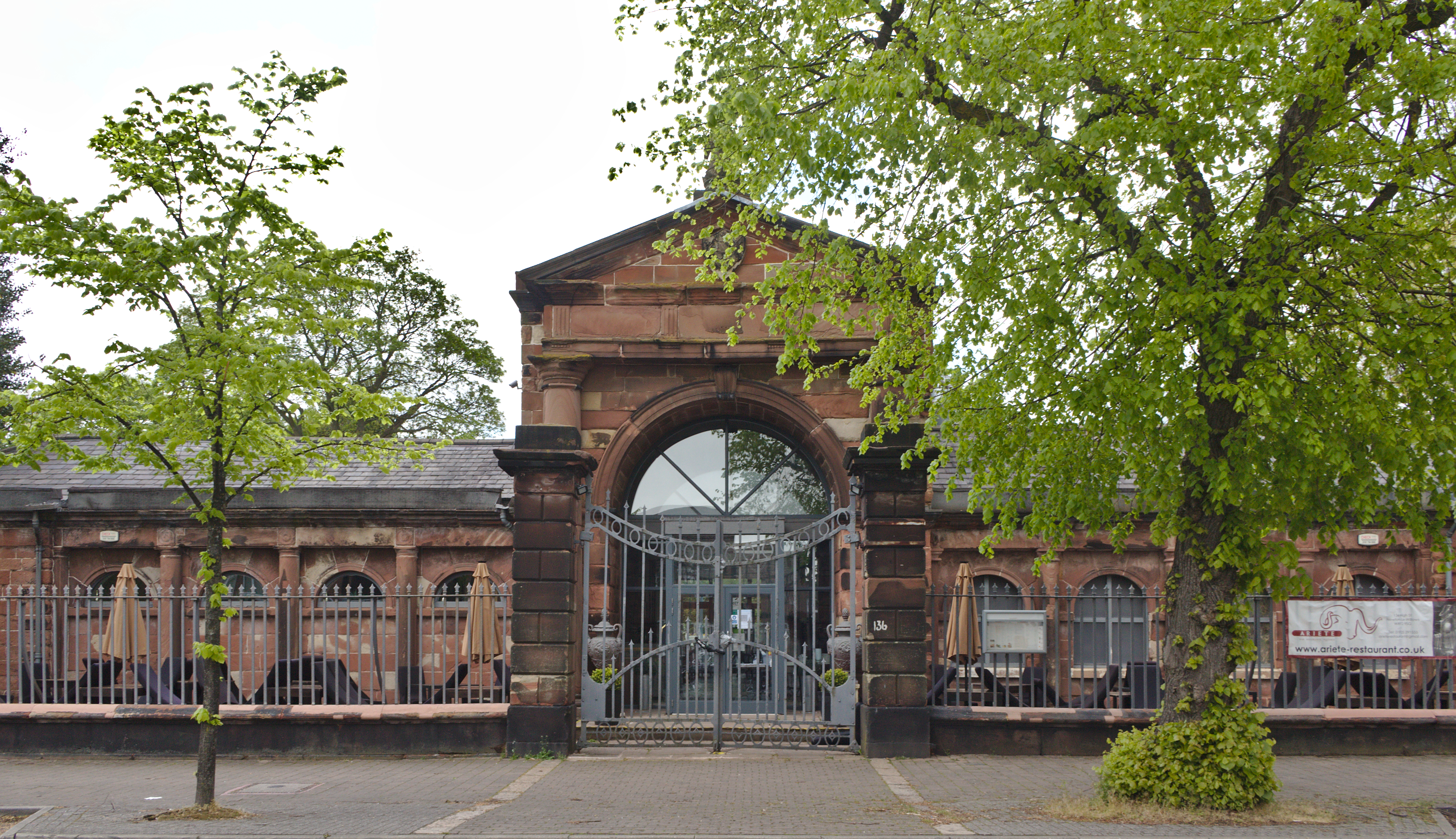
Randall's Arch

Newton's growth principally took place from the mid-19th century however the local area has been inhabited for the past millennium. An approximately 20 ft (6.1 m) wide road constructed during the Roman occupation of Britain roughly connecting Warrington and Wigan lies beneath the town running south to north through the Wargrave area.

Before the Norman Conquest, Newton was head of a hundred. The Domesday hundred was assessed at five hides one of which included Newton. The lord of the manor was Edward the Confessor at his death in 1066. The Newton Hundred was subsequently combined with the Warrington and Derby Hundreds to form the West Derby Hundred.

The barony was held by the Banastre family from the Conquest to 1286 and passed successively to the Langtons, Fleetwoods and Leghs. It does not seem that the barons were ever summoned to parliament, and the title, like all parliamentary titles, fell into disuse after the abolition of feudal tenures. The township returned two members to parliament from 1559 to 1831, but was disfranchised by the Reform Act 1832. There was a market here at least as early as 1558.

The fields between Newton and Winwick were the site of the battle of Winwick, the last battle of the Second English Civil War.

Newton has two railway stations. Newton-le-Willows railway station and Earlestown railway station, opened in 1830. They are two of the oldest railway stations. Earlestown was an important junction where the original Liverpool and Manchester Railway line was joined by the 1837 line running south to Birmingham. The town also had three other railway stations, at Parkside, the Vulcan Village, and the old racecourse (which closed when Haydock Park Racecourse was opened). Parkside is notable as the site of the world's first fatal rail accident, in which MP William Huskisson died. Two other railway related landmarks are Newton Viaduct and the Sankey Viaduct known locally as the "Nine Arches".

The town's strategic location at the intersection of two major railway lines led it to become a major manufacturer of locomotives, with the Vulcan Foundry operating from the mid 19th century up to its closure in 1962. The Vulcan Foundry was one of the town's most important employers at the time alongside various coal mines including Parkside Colliery and neighbouring Haydock Collieries. Newton's economy spans various sectors in the present day, with element of manufacturing continuing within the Sankey Industrial Estate. The town is also noted as hosting the head office of Vimto manufacturer Nichols.

== Governance ==
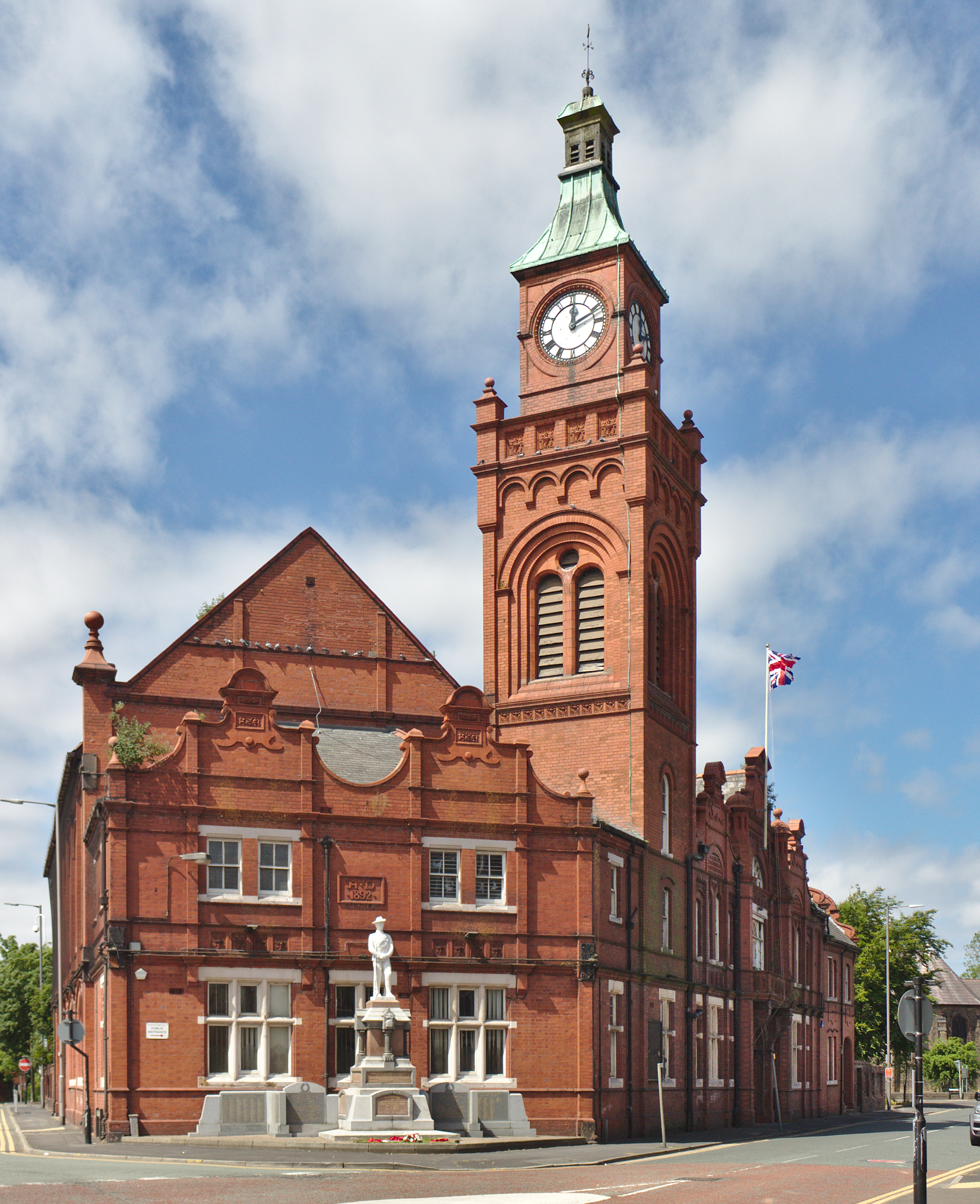
Earlestown Town Hall

Forming part of the historic county boundaries of Lancashire from a very early time, Newton-le-Willows is an ancient town. It was initially part of the Fee of Makerfield, which was part of the West Derby Hundred. It was later made a parliamentary borough from 1558 until 1832, one of the earliest in Lancashire. From this date until 1894, the town came under the control of a court leet and improvement commissioners. The developing industrial town was then created into an urban district under the name Newton in Makerfield. The name of the urban district was changed in 1939 to Newton-le-Willows. On 1 April 1974 Newton-le-Willows Urban District Council merged with a number of neighbouring local authorities, to create St Helens Metropolitan Borough Council in the new ceremonial county of Merseyside.

Newton-le-Willows is split into two wards, Newton East and Newton West; each ward returns three councillors to serve on St Helens Borough Council. As of May 2022, the East ward is represented by three Labour councillors, while Newton West has two Independent councillors and one Labour.

== Geography ==
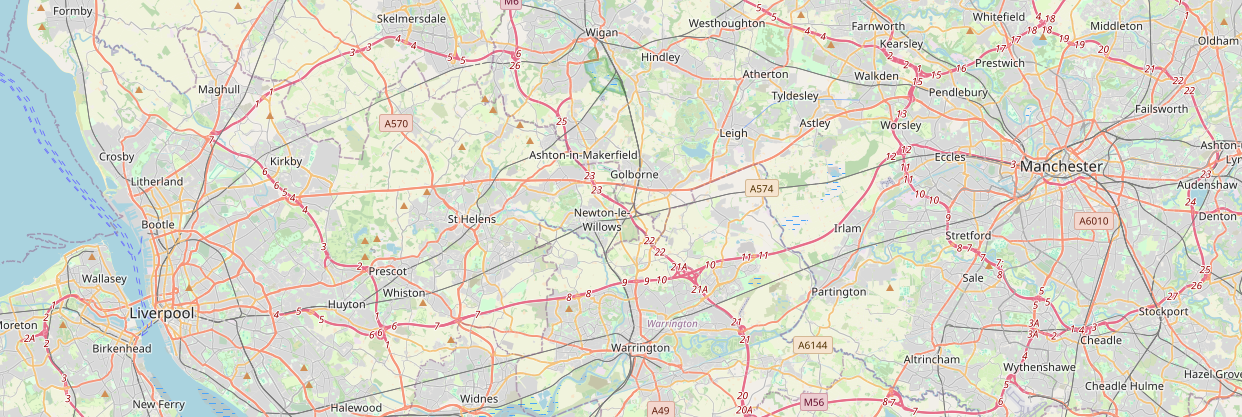
Newton-le-Willows (centre of map) is located at the easternmost edge of Merseyside adjacent to the Greater Manchester borough of Wigan and unitary authority of Warrington in Cheshire

Newton-le-Willows is located off the A580 East Lancashire Road between Liverpool and Manchester in north-west England. It is in the east of the Metropolitan Borough of St Helens in Merseyside, near to the border with Wigan in Greater Manchester. To the south is the Borough of Warrington in Cheshire. The wider built-up area of Newton-le-Willows includes Earlestown and areas of Wargrave and Vulcan Village.

The town is considered as part of the Greater Manchester Built-up Area for statistical purposes despite being situated within Merseyside.

== Transport ==
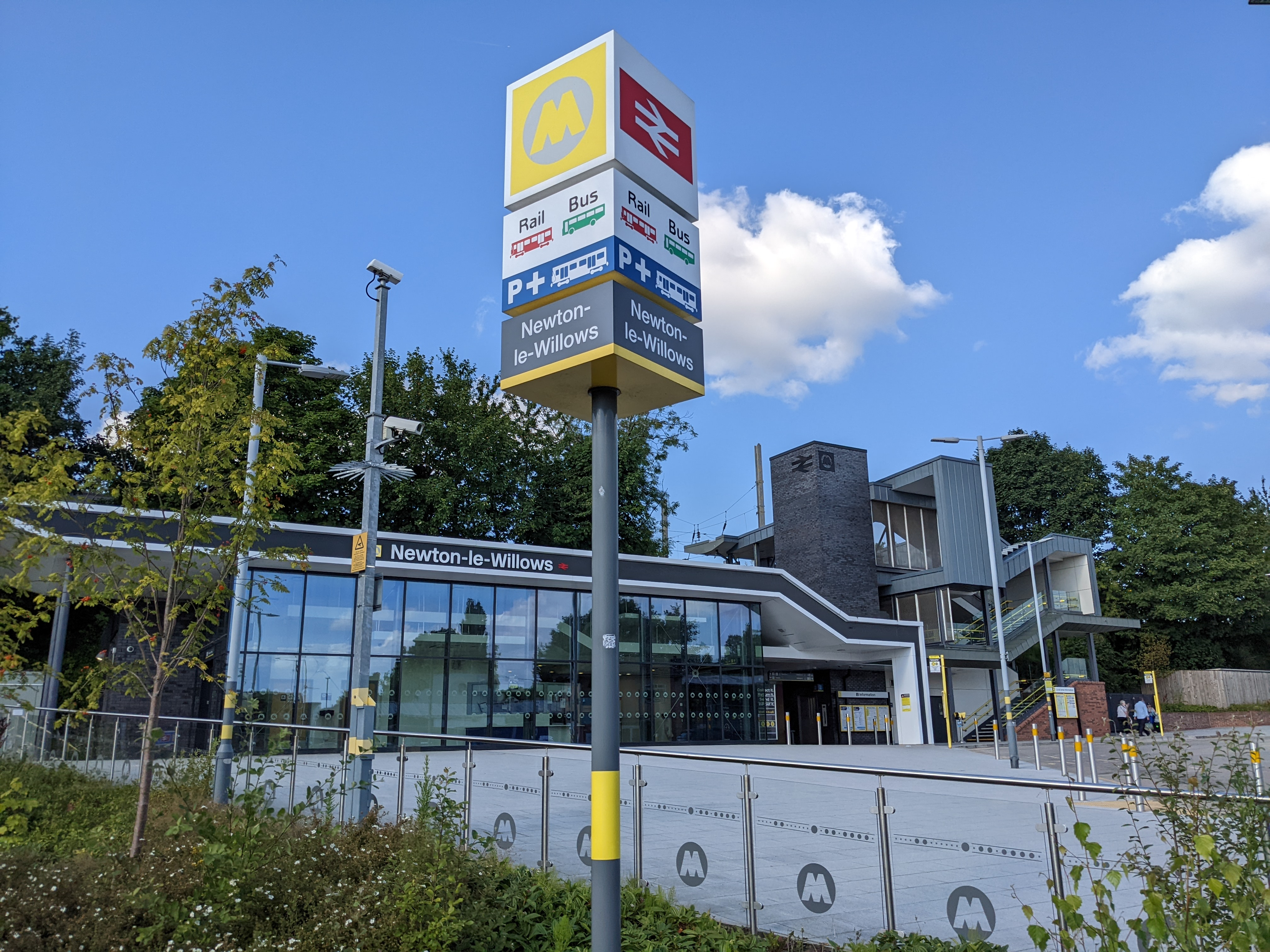
Newton-le-Willows railway station

The M6 and M62 motorways and A580 East Lancashire Road pass close to the town. This has helped Newton become an important commuter town, now that most of its industry has gone, with the city centres of Manchester and Liverpool also being accessible by train in as little as 17 minutes and 18 minutes respectively. There have as a result been many new housing estates built around the outskirts of the town.

The Sankey Canal passes through the town and is crossed, on the Sankey Viaduct, by the world's first passenger railway, also within the boundaries of the town.

Newton-le-Willows and Earlestown railway stations have a regional service with regular trains running to Liverpool and Manchester, St Helens, Warrington, Chester, West Yorkshire and along the North Wales coast to Llandudno. Earlestown is a very large station for the size of the town, with 5 platforms. On platform 2 is the old waiting room, regarded as one of the oldest remaining railway buildings in the world.

There is a small bus station in Tamworth Street, with a number of bus routes running around the town, and out of town services connecting neighbouring Burtonwood, Haydock, Ashton-in-Makerfield, Lowton, Garswood and major towns of Warrington, St. Helens, Wigan and Leigh.

== Religion ==
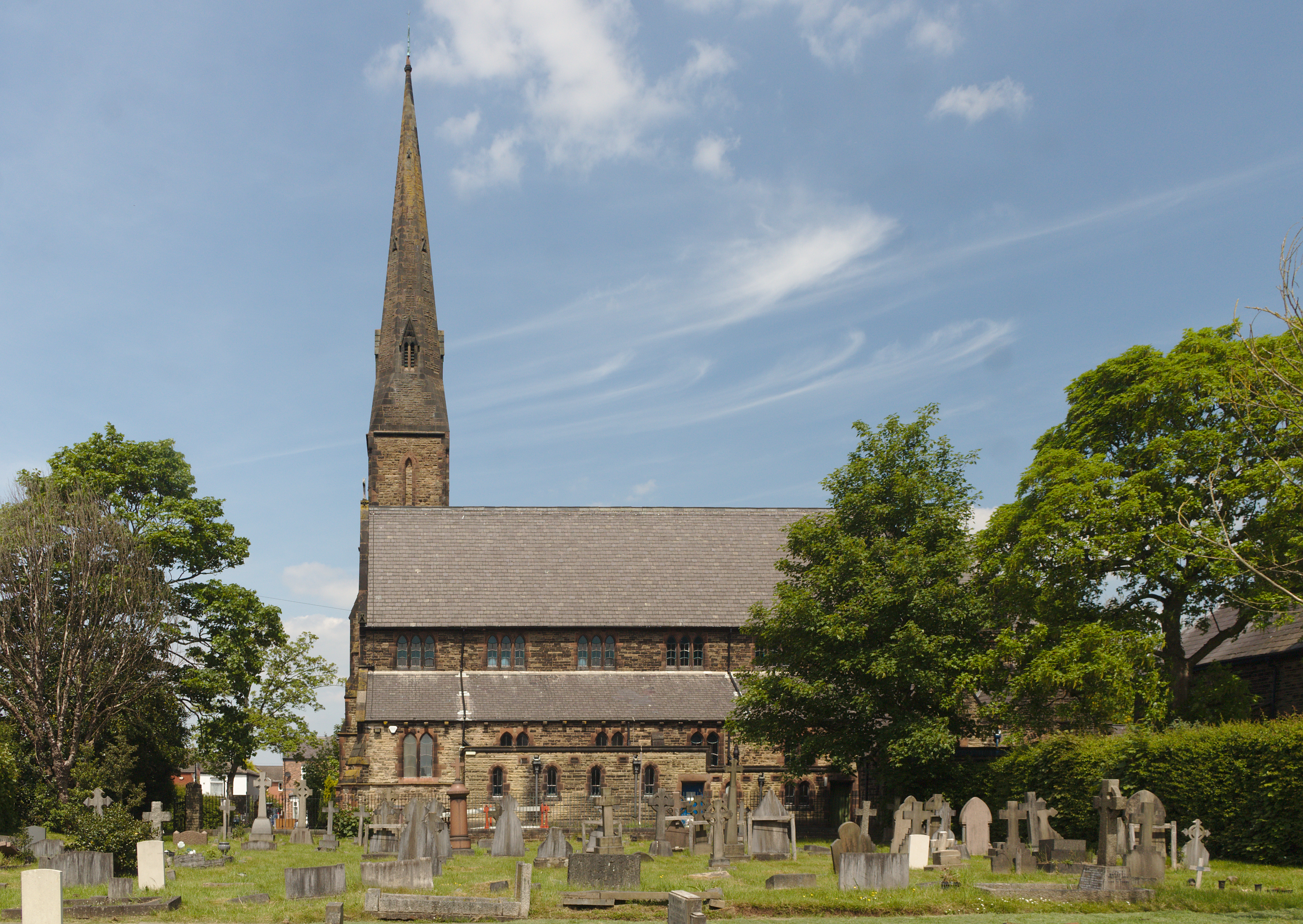
Church of SS Mary and John

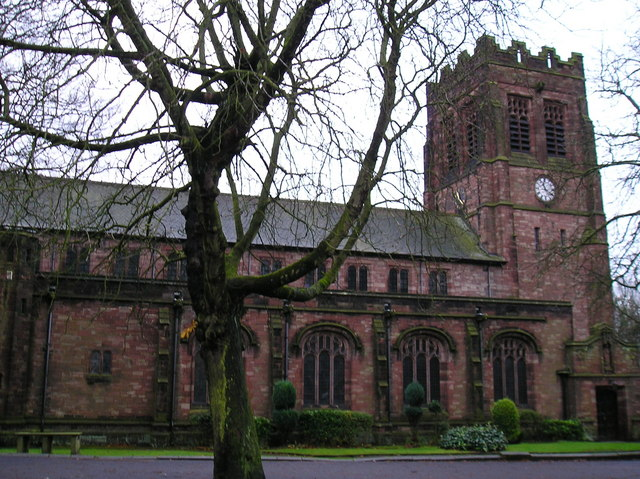
St Peter's Church, Newton-le-Willows

Once part of the ancient parish of Winwick, the town is split into four Anglican parishes, St Peter's covering Newton, St John's covering Earlestown, Emmanuel covering Wargrave and All Saints' covering the northern parts of the town.

Similar to other towns in Lancashire, Newton has a large Roman Catholic population and there are three Catholic churches in the town: St Patrick's in Earlestown, St Mary and St John's in Newton and St David's in Wargrave.

There are also other denominations represented in the town, such as the Methodist and Baptist churches in the town centre.

== Local media ==
From Victorian times until 2007, the town had a number of local newspapers. The Newton and Golborne Guardian was the longest established, which ceased publication in 2007. Other papers to have served the town over the years include the Earlestown Guardian, and Newton Reporter. The town comes within the distribution area of the St Helens Star and St Helens Reporter, both free newspapers. The Warrington Guardian, Liverpool Echo, Manchester Evening News and Wigan Post are widely available within the town.

Local radio is provided by WA12Radio, an internet-based radio station, set up in 2011 and named after the local postal code. The station is now part of Newton Boys and Girls Club. Regional radio is provided by Heart North West, BBC Radio Merseyside and BBC Radio Manchester.

The town falls within the BBC North West region and Granada region for ITV.

== Sport ==
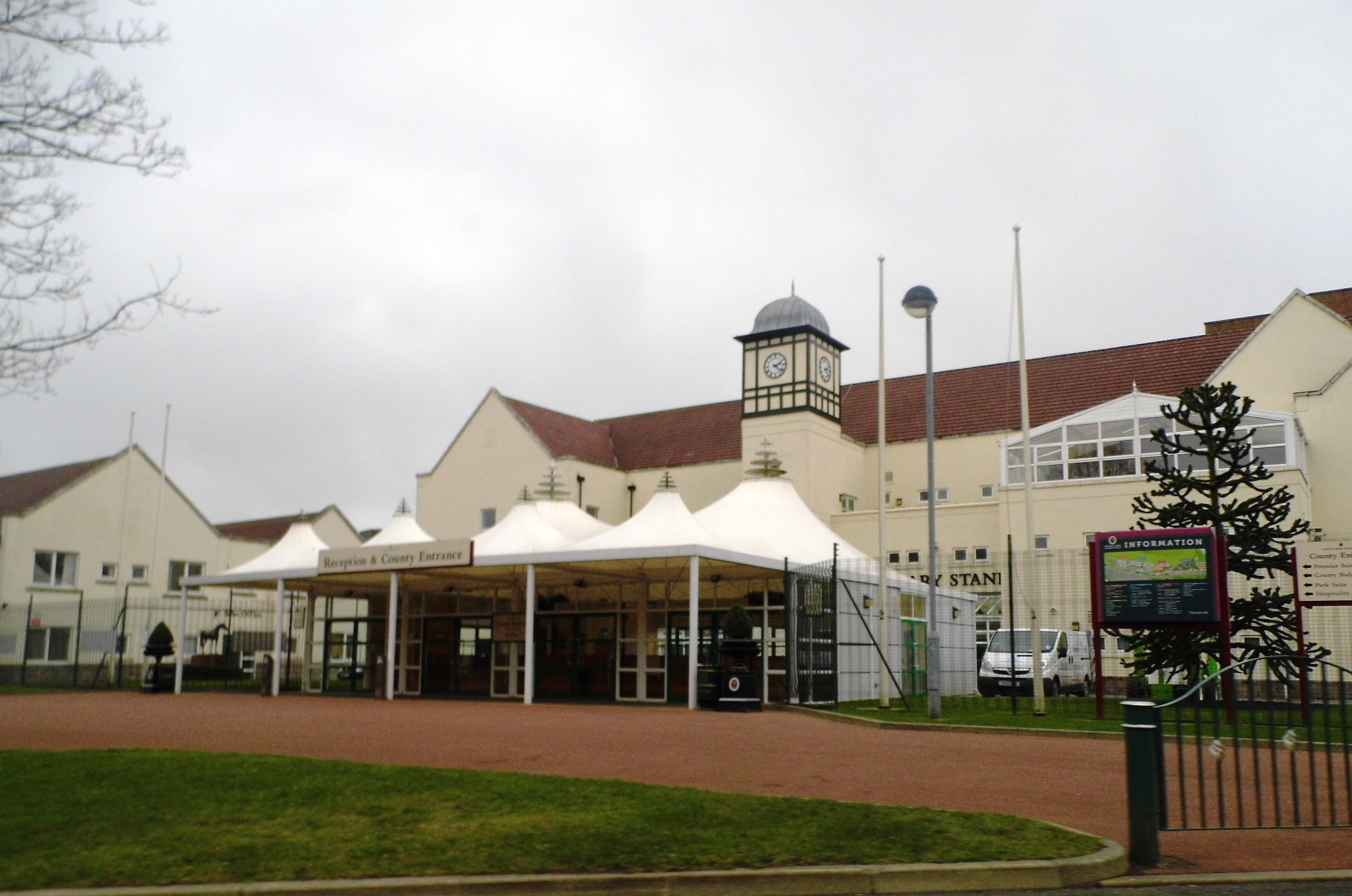
Haydock Park Racecourse on the outskirts of the town

Newton-le-Willows racecourse closed down in 1898 and was replaced by Haydock Park Racecourse. The Old Newton Cup is the world's oldest continually competed for trophy, with a history dating back over 200 years.

Football has always been an important sport within the town, and Newton-le-Willows had its own club between 1894 and 1908. Newton-le-Willows F.C. played in the local leagues until the 1900–01 season when the club joined the English Combination where they competed for three years. In 1903–04 season the club joined the Lancashire Combination where their derby matches included Bryn Central and Wigan Town (a forerunner of Wigan Athletic). The club left the league at the end of the 1907–08 season and folded three years later. Newton-le-Willows home ground was the Pied Bull Ground which was situated behind the public house of the same name and bordered Rob Lane (then Golborne Road), more or less where the Parchments estate lies.

There has been a couple of spells that Earlestown Football Club has been quite successful. The team competed in the Lancashire Combination league which at the time (1950s/1960s) was the equivalent of today's Conference North. Earlestown enjoyed a local rivalry with a number of teams which would go on to national prominence, especially Wigan Athletic. Earlestown was a very ambitious club who hit the headlines when they signed Wilf Mannion as player manager. Crowds of one or two thousand were not unknown for local derbies. However, falling gates and the cost of a professional squad forced the club into bankruptcy in the mid 1960s. In its earlier history, Earlestown F.C. created a few pieces of history, including being defeated by Everton in the Liverpool Cup which was the Toffees' first cup final victory. A year later, Earlestown won the final beating an Everton side that would help form the football league just three years later. Earlestown also played Everton in the first ever match at Anfield stadium. A number of smaller teams operated in the town, the most prominent being Vulcan Newton who have previously been in the Lancashire Combination and North West Counties League.

The area is very popular for rugby league, with St Helens R.F.C., Warrington Wolves, Widnes Vikings, Wigan Warriors, Salford Red Devils and Leigh Leopards all being local teams. However, Newton-le-Willows never had a rugby league team until 2002, with the formation of Newton Storm RLFC. Storm has become one of the fastest-growing amateur rugby league clubs in the north-west. Rugby union was historically the most popular code in the town, with two teams, Newton-le-Willows RUFC and Vulcan RUFC being prominent teams in the South Lancashire and Cheshire leagues. The most prominent players in the past have been former England and British Lions international Fran Cotton, and Wigan player Steve Hampson.

Cricket is now the major sport in the town, with Newton C.C. playing in the Premier Division of the Liverpool Competition, a major north west league with teams stretching from the Fylde coast to North Wales competing in it. Vulcan C.C. also represent the town on a more localised level. Newton has produced a number of players who have progressed onto Lancashire County Cricket Club.

== Notable people ==
- George McCorquodale (1817–1895), founded his printing business in the town in 1846.
- Norman Harvey (1899–1942), awarded the Victoria Cross during the First World War for bravery on the field of battle.
- John Randall (1905–1984), physicist and biophysicist, developed the cavity magnetron used in radar systems
- Rodney Porter (1917–1985), biochemist, won a Nobel Prize in 1972.
- Colin Welland (1934–2015), writer and actor, won an Oscar for writing the script of the film Chariots of Fire
- Lynda La Plante (born 1943), author, screenwriter and former actress
- Rick Astley (born 1966), pop star, most known for Never Gonna Give You Up
- Andy Burnham (born 1970), the United Kingdom Prime Minister, representing the Labour party, and former Leigh MP and Shadow Home Secretary was educated at St Aelred's High School in Newton. He was elected as Mayor of Greater Manchester in 2017 and was named as the country's Prime Minister in 2026.
- Steve Marsh (born 1979), actor, played Big Cook Ben in Big Cook, Little Cook between 2004 and 2006

=== Sport ===
- Wilf Mannion (1918–2000), former Middlesbrough and England winger was the manager of the town's most successful football club, Earlestown F.C. between 1960 and 1962
- Joe Fagan (1921–2001), the former Manchester City football player and European Cup–winning Liverpool F.C. manager, who resigned his post after the Heysel disaster started his career playing for Earlestown Bohemians FC in the 1930s
- Roger Hunt (1938–2021), former Liverpool and England World Cup–winning footballer, was born in the neighbouring village of Culcheth; his family's business Hunt Brothers Haulage is based in Newton-le-Willows
- Fran Cotton (born 1947), started playing rugby union for Newton RUFC before moving on to Sale, Greater Manchester and the British Lions; he runs the Cotton Traders sportswear firm in nearby Altrincham
- Ed Clancy (born 1985), Olympic Gold Medalist for Great Britain in the Team Pursuit event at Beijing 2008
- Martin Kelly (born 1990), current West Brom and former England U-21 international was born in Newton-le-Willows and attended St Aelred's Catholic Technology College

== Bibliography ==
- Liverpool & Manchester Railway 1830–1980, Frank Ferneyhough, Book Club Associates, London, 1980, (no ISBN)
