= Earlestown F.C. =

Earlestown Football Club may refer to:

- Earlestown F.C. (1880), an association football club from St Helens in Lancashire which existed from 1880 to 1911.
- Earlestown F.C. (1945), an association football club from the same town which existed from 1945 to 1962.
