= St John the Baptist's Church, Earlestown =

Coordinates: 53.4536°N 2.6447°W

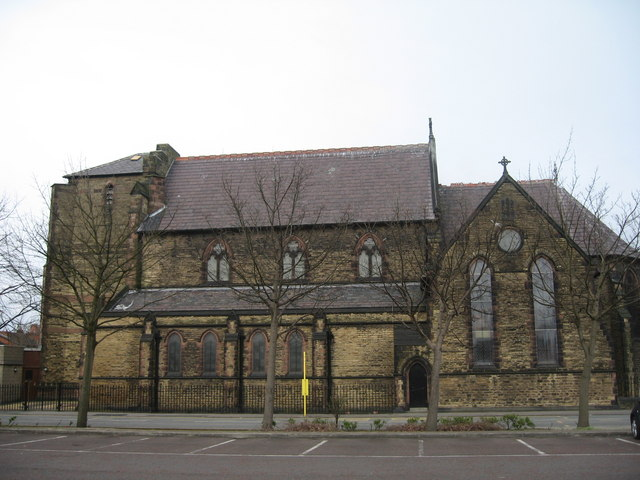
- St John the Baptist's Church, Earlestown, from the south

- Location in Merseyside
- OS grid reference: SJ 57285 95396
- Location: Market Street, Earlestown, St Helens, Merseyside
- Country: England
- Denomination: Anglican
- Website: St John, Earlestown

History
- Status: Parish church
- Founded: 4 August 1875
- Dedication: John the Baptist
- Consecrated: 6 January 1879

Architecture
- Functional status: Active
- Architect(s): Whalley and Fry; Austin and Paley
- Architectural type: Church
- Style: Gothic Revival
- Groundbreaking: 1875
- Completed: 1926

Specifications
- Materials: Sandstone

Administration
- Province: York
- Diocese: Liverpool
- Archdeaconry: Warrington
- Deanery: Winwick
- Parish: St John the Baptist, Earlestown

Clergy
- Rector: Revd Chris Stafford

St John the Baptist's Church is in Market Street, Earlestown, St Helens, Merseyside, England. It is an active Anglican parish church in the deanery of Winwick, the archdeaconry of Warrington, and the diocese of Liverpool. Its benefice is united with those of St Peter, Newton-in-Makerfield, All Saints, Newton-le-Willows, and Emmanuel Wargrave, Newton-le-Willows. Revd Dr Chris Stafford is currently the Team Rector for the Benefice.

== History ==
In the 1870s the population of Earlestown was growing. At that time it was in the parish of St Peter, Newton-in-Makerfield, whose rector was Canon Whalley. The architects Whalley and Fry of Dover (Note: The architect C. T. Whalley was the rector's son.) created plans for a church to seat 900 people, with a tower, at an estimated cost of £16,000 (equivalent to £1,600,000 in 2025). The foundation stone of the church was laid on 4 August 1875. There was insufficient money to build the church as it was originally planned, and a smaller church seating 600 people, and without a tower, was consecrated on 6 January 1879 by the Assistant Bishop of Chester. In 1925–26 the church was extended by half a bay, providing 90 extra seats, and the base of a tower was built. The work was carried out by the Lancaster architects Austin and Paley at a cost of about £6,000 (equivalent to £320,000 in 2025). The tower was never completed. In the 1970s an annexe was added to the west end of the tower.

== Architecture ==
The church is constructed in yellow sandstone with red sandstone dressings; the annexe is in concrete. The plan consists of a 3½-bay nave with a clerestory, north and south aisles, and an apsidal chancel with north and south vestries. At the west end is the base of the uncompleted tower, and an attached single-storey annexe. The windows are lancets containing Geometrical tracery. The interior of the church has been re-ordered, with removal of choir stall and pews, and with a platform extending to the west of the chancel arch. The font and the pulpit are both in stone with alabaster shafts. In the east window is stained glass by Shrigley and Hunt.

== See also ==
- List of ecclesiastical works by Austin and Paley (1916–44)

== Notes and references ==
Notes

Citations
