= Sankey Canal =

Canal in England

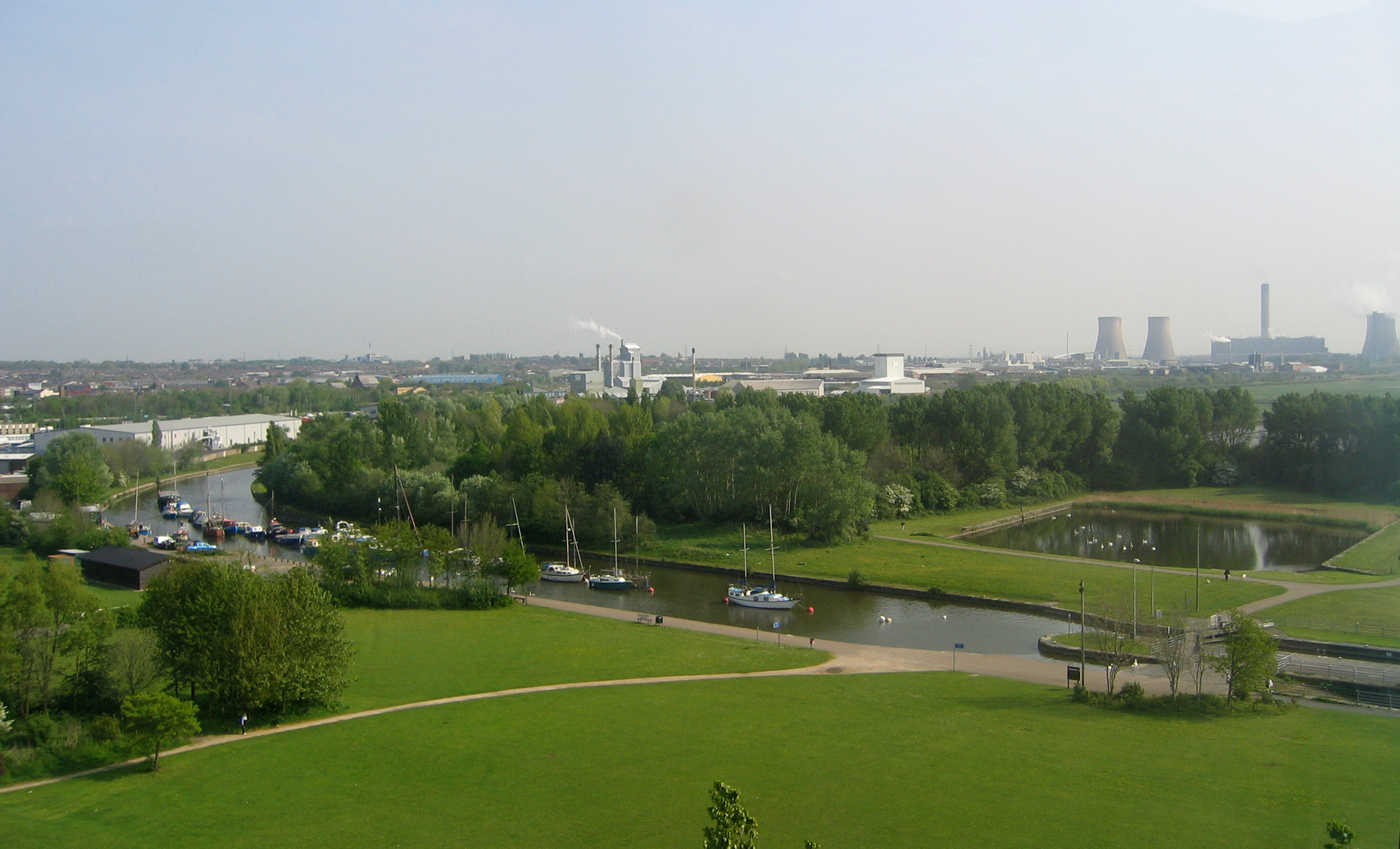
- The start of the Sankey Canal at Spike Island in Widnes

Specifications
- Locks: 16
- Status: Partly restored

History
- Original owner: Sankey Brook Navigation Co
- Principal engineer: Henry Berry
- Date of act: 1755
- Date of first use: 1757
- Date closed: 1963

Geography
- Start point: River Mersey, Widnes
- End point: St Helens
- Connects to: River Mersey

The Sankey Canal in North West England, initially known as the Sankey Brook Navigation and later the St Helens Canal, is a former industrial canal, which when opened in 1757 was England's first of the Industrial revolution, and the first modern canal.

The canal eventually connected St Helens to the River Mersey at Spike Island in Widnes. Originally it followed the valley of the Sankey Brook from the Mersey through Warrington to Parr following which extensions were constructed at the Mersey end to Fiddlers Ferry and then to Widnes, while at the northern end it was extended to Sutton.

The canal was abandoned between 1931 and 1963 but has been the object of ongoing restoration attempts since 1980.

== History ==
The Sankey Canal was built principally to transport coal from Haydock Collieries and Parr to the growing chemical industries of Liverpool, although iron ore and corn were important cargoes. The industries rapidly expanded, and spread along the line of the canal to St Helens, Haydock, Newton le Willows and Widnes, which were small villages until this period. The canal was an important factor in the industrial growth of the region.

The line of the canal was surveyed by Henry Berry and William Taylor, for which they charged £66. Berry, who had previously worked with Thomas Steers, Liverpool’s first dock engineer, on the Newry Canal in Northern Ireland, was Liverpool’s second dock engineer, but was appointed engineer for the navigation when the promoters convinced the Dock Trustees to release him for two days a week. It is not known whether Berry or the promoters presented the plans to Parliament as an upgrade to the river navigation, despite building it as a true canal, but it is thought to be the only time a canal was authorised by Parliament without anyone petitioning against it.

=== First act of Parliament ===
Sankey Brook Navigation Act 1755
- Act of Parliament
- Parliament of Great Britain
- Long title: An Act for making navigable the River or Brook called Sankey Brook, and the Three several Branches thereof, from the River Mersey, below Sankey Bridges, up to Boardman's Stone Bridge on the South Branch, to Gerrard's Bridge on the Middle Branch thereof, and to Penny Bridge on the North Branch thereof, all in the County Palatine of Lancaster; and also for adjusting the Measure of Coal to be brought down the said River or Brook, and sold within the Town of Liverpool in the said County.
- Citation: 28 Geo. 2. c. 8
- Territorial extent: Great Britain

Dates
- Royal assent: 20 March 1755
- Commencement: 14 November 1754 (Note: Start of session.)
- Repealed: 29 May 1830
Other legislation
Amended by	Sankey Brook Navigation Act 1762
Repealed by	Sankey Brook Navigation Act 1830

Status: Repealed

Text of statute as originally enacted

The act of Parliament authorising the construction of the navigation, the Sankey Brook Navigation Act 1755 (28 Geo. 2. c. 8), was passed on 20 March 1755. It was entitled "An Act for making navigable the River or Brook called Sankey Brook, and Three several Branches thereof from the River Mersey below Sankey Bridges, up to Boardman's Stone Bridge on the South Branch, to Gerrard's Bridge on the Middle Branch, and to Penny Bridge on the North Branch, all in the county palatine of Lancaster."

The canal was open and carrying coal by 1757; carriage of all goods was charged at a flat rate of 10d (ten old pence – £0.04, equivalent to £6 when adjusted for inflation) per ton. Upon its opening it became Britain's first canal of the Industrial Revolution.

As the title of the act states, in addition to the mainline between the Mersey and Parr, three branches were built to nearby collieries: the South Branch to Boardman's Stone Bridge, Parr; the Middle Branch to Gerrard's Bridge; and the North Branch to Penny Bridge.

=== Second act of Parliament ===
Sankey Brook Navigation Act 1762
- Act of Parliament
- Parliament of Great Britain
- Long title: An Act to amend, and render more effectual, an Act made in the Twenty-eighth Year of the Reign of His late Majesty King George the Second, for making navigable Sankey Brook, in the County of Lancaster; and for the extending and improving the said Navigation.
- Citation: 2 Geo. 3. c. 56
- Territorial extent: Great Britain

Dates
- Royal assent: 8 April 1762
- Commencement: 3 November 1761
- Repealed: 29 May 1830
Other legislation
Amends	Sankey Brook Navigation Act 1755
Repealed by	Sankey Brook Navigation Act 1830

Status: Repealed

Text of statute as originally enacted

A second act of Parliament, the Sankey Brook Navigation Act 1762 (2 Geo. 3. c. 56), was obtained on 8 April 1762, amending the earlier act, and was entitled "An Act to amend and render more effectual, an Act made in the Twenty-eighth Year of the Reign of his late Majesty King George the Second, for making navigable Sankey Brook, in the county of Lancaster, and for the extending and improving the said Navigation".

This authorised the extension of the navigation to Fiddler's Ferry on the River Mersey, and to take an additional toll of two-pence per ton, making the rate one shilling (£0.05) per ton.

The line of this extension was surveyed by John Eyes, who acted as principal witness to see the bill through Parliament.

An early trial of steam power took place on 16 June 1797, when, according to the Billing's Liverpool Advertiser, dated 26 June, John Smith's "vessel heavily laden with copper slag, passed along the Sankey Canal ... by the application of steam only ... it appears, that the vessel after a course of 10 miles [16 km], returned the same evening to St Helens whence it had set out". The boat was powered by a Newcomen engine working a paddle crankshaft through a beam and connecting rod.

=== Third act of Parliament ===
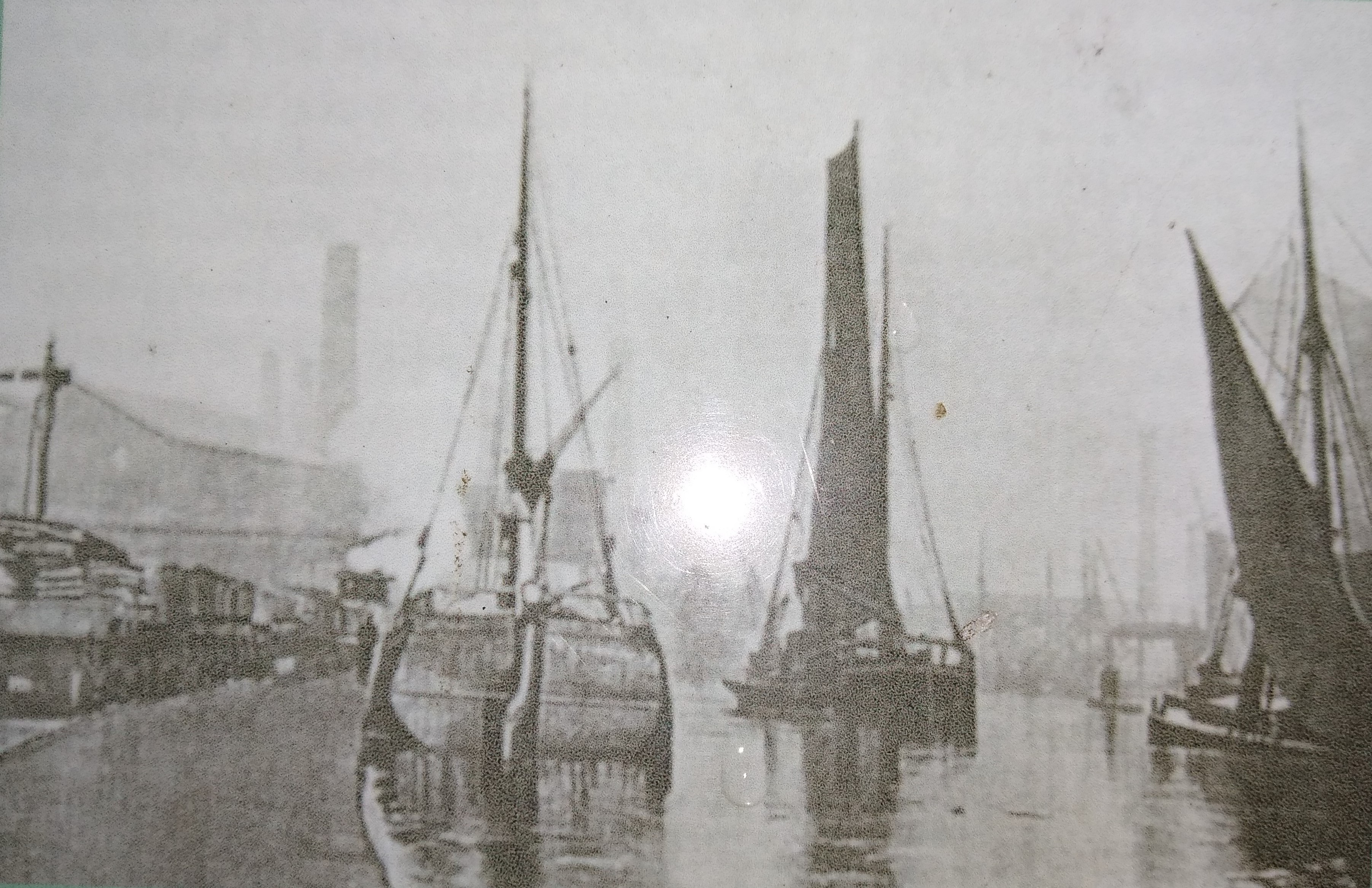
The Sankey Canal basin at Spike Island, circa 1850

To counter competition from the new railways, another extension was planned from Fiddler's Ferry across Cuerdley and Widnes Salt Marshes to Widnes Wharf, on the west bank of the River Mersey near Runcorn Gap, creating a second connection to the Mersey and another basin.

Sankey Brook Navigation Act 1830
- Act of Parliament
- Parliament of the United Kingdom
- Long title: An Act to consolidate and amend the Acts relating to the Sankey Brook Navigation, in the County of Lancaster; and to make a Navigable Canal from the said Navigation at Fidler's Ferry, to communicate with the River Mersey at Widness Wharf, near Westbank, in the Township of Widness, in the said County.
- Citation: 11 Geo. 4 & 1 Will. 4. c. l
- Territorial extent: United Kingdom

Dates
- Royal assent: 29 May 1830
- Commencement: 29 May 1830 (Note: Section 1.)
Other legislation
Repeals/revokes	Sankey Brook Navigation Act 1755; Sankey Brook Navigation Act 1762
Amended by	Sankey Brook Navigation Act 1845; Saint Helens Improvement Act 1845; St. Helens Canal and Railway Act 1846; St. Helens Canal and Railway Transfer Act 1864; London, Midland and Scottish Railway Act 1936

Status: Amended

Text of statute as originally enacted

This was authorised by a third act of Parliament, the Sankey Brook Navigation Act 1830 (11 Geo. 4 & 1 Will. 4. c. l), granted on 29 May 1830, entitled "An Act to consolidate and amend the Acts relating to the Sankey Brook Navigation, in the county of Lancaster; and to make a New Canal from the said Navigation at Fidler's Ferry, to communicate with the River Mersey at Widness Wharf, near West Bank, in the township of Widnes, in the said county".

This act repealed the acts of 1755 and 1762, and incorporated the proprietors under the title of "The Company of Proprietors of the Sankey Brook Navigation."

Francis Giles was appointed engineer for this extension, which opened in 1833. In 1825 Giles, who was a pupil of John Rennie and involved in many canal projects of the period, had proposed a link from the Sankey, via an aqueduct across the Mersey, to the Bridgewater Canal and the Mersey and Irwell Navigation, but this was never implemented.

== Operation ==
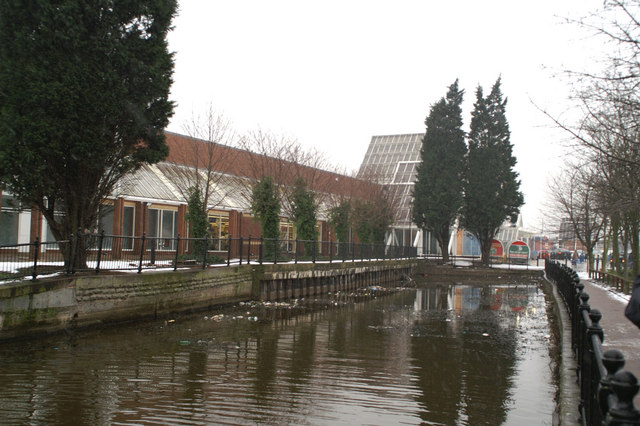
The current end point of the canal in St Helens

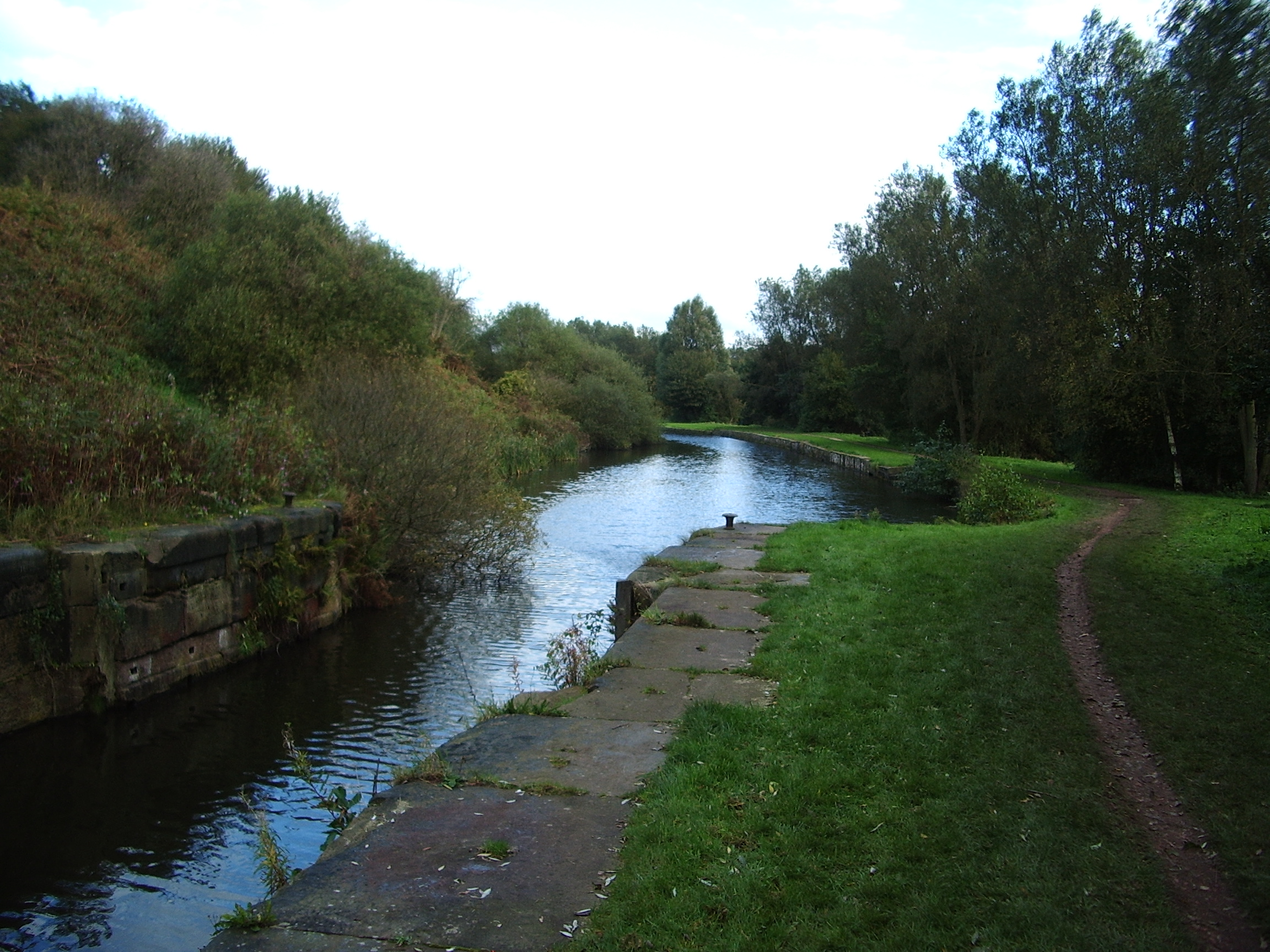

The Sankey Canal was built for Mersey Flats, the common sailing craft of the local rivers; they were used on the Mersey, Irwell and Weaver and along the Lancashire and North Wales coasts. To allow for the masts of the flats, swing bridges were constructed where roads crossed the canal. When the railways were built, they too had to cross in similar fashion. The exception was near the newly built town in Newton-Le-Willows that was to become Earlestown, where George Stephenson erected the Sankey Viaduct for the Liverpool and Manchester Railway, leaving 70-foot (21 m) headroom for the flats' sails.

The canal's immediate commercial success, followed soon after by that of the Bridgewater Canal, led to a mania of canal building, and for further extension schemes to be proposed for the Sankey Canal. Francis Giles' proposal to link the canal to the Bridgwater Canal was not implemented, and neither was a plan to link the canal to the Leeds and Liverpool Canal near Leigh, to the North-East. Apart from the early extension to Fiddlers Ferry, which provided better access to the River Mersey, and the 1775 extension to St Helens, the only major change came with the extension to Widnes in the 1830s. Built primarily to take coal from Haydock and Parr down to the Mersey and so on to the saltfields of Cheshire and Liverpool, the final traffic on the Sankey Canal was very different, and in the opposite direction, consisting of raw sugar for the Sankey Sugar Works at Earlestown, Newton-le-Willows, from Liverpool.

In 1877, it was reportedly the case that, due to the pollution of a local Leblanc alkali works, "The mud deposited in the Sankey Brook, near St Helens, has been found to contain no less than 2.26 percent of arsenic ... The water of the Sankey Brook is so acid that iron fittings cannot safely be used in the barges and lock gates."

In 2004, St Michael's Golf Course, a municipal golf course in nearby Widnes built atop 30 hectares of land from old chemical waste tips was closed due to high levels of arsenic found in the soil. Reportedly, by 1891, 500 acres (2.0 km^{2}) of nearby Widnes and Ditton Marshes were buried under an average depth of 12 feet (3.7 m) of toxic galligu from alkali operations near the Sankey Canal. The galligu detritus was estimated at 10 million tonnes in total weight.

In 1845 the St Helens and Runcorn Gap Railway Company and the then more prosperous Sankey Canal Company merged to form the St Helens Canal and Railway Company.

=== Closure ===
The ending of the sugar traffic in 1959 led to the closure of the canal in 1963. North of the sugar works, closure had taken place in 1931, and fixed bridges quickly replaced the old wooden swing bridges.

== Restoration ==
Restoration of the canal began in 1980, when work began on the section between Bewsey and Liverpool Road, Great Sankey, funded by a Derelict Land Grant. Most of the canal is still in water and much has been restored to navigable standard, with short sections at Fiddlers Ferry, Warrington and Spike Island, Widnes having locks into the Mersey which have allowed craft access to the canal for mooring since the locks were restored in the 1980s. However, fixed bridges which replaced the original wooden swing bridges and other obstructions isolate the sections from one another. The route of the canal passes through the Sankey Valley Park and the towpath from Sankey Bridges to Widnes now forms part of the Trans Pennine Trail.

There are plans to restore the canal, and perhaps to extend it northwards to join the main canal system via the Leeds and Liverpool Canal. The total cost of this would be in excess of £100m and it is therefore a long-term project. There are, however, plans to dig out an infilled section in the centre of St Helens as part of the town's Eastside development. A feasibility study for this work was funded by a grant from the Single Regeneration Budget Fund, while at the other end of the canal, the Widnes Waterfront plan, published by Halton Council, and the new Mersey crossing between Widnes and Runcorn were expected to lead to further restoration at Widnes. One major obstacle is that the canal is severed by the A57 dual carriageway in Warrington.

Following the closure of the Fiddlers Ferry power station which previously pumped water into the canal, the water level at Spike Island has begun to drop. The locks to the River Mersey are currently unable to be opened for fear of losing more water.

== Structures ==
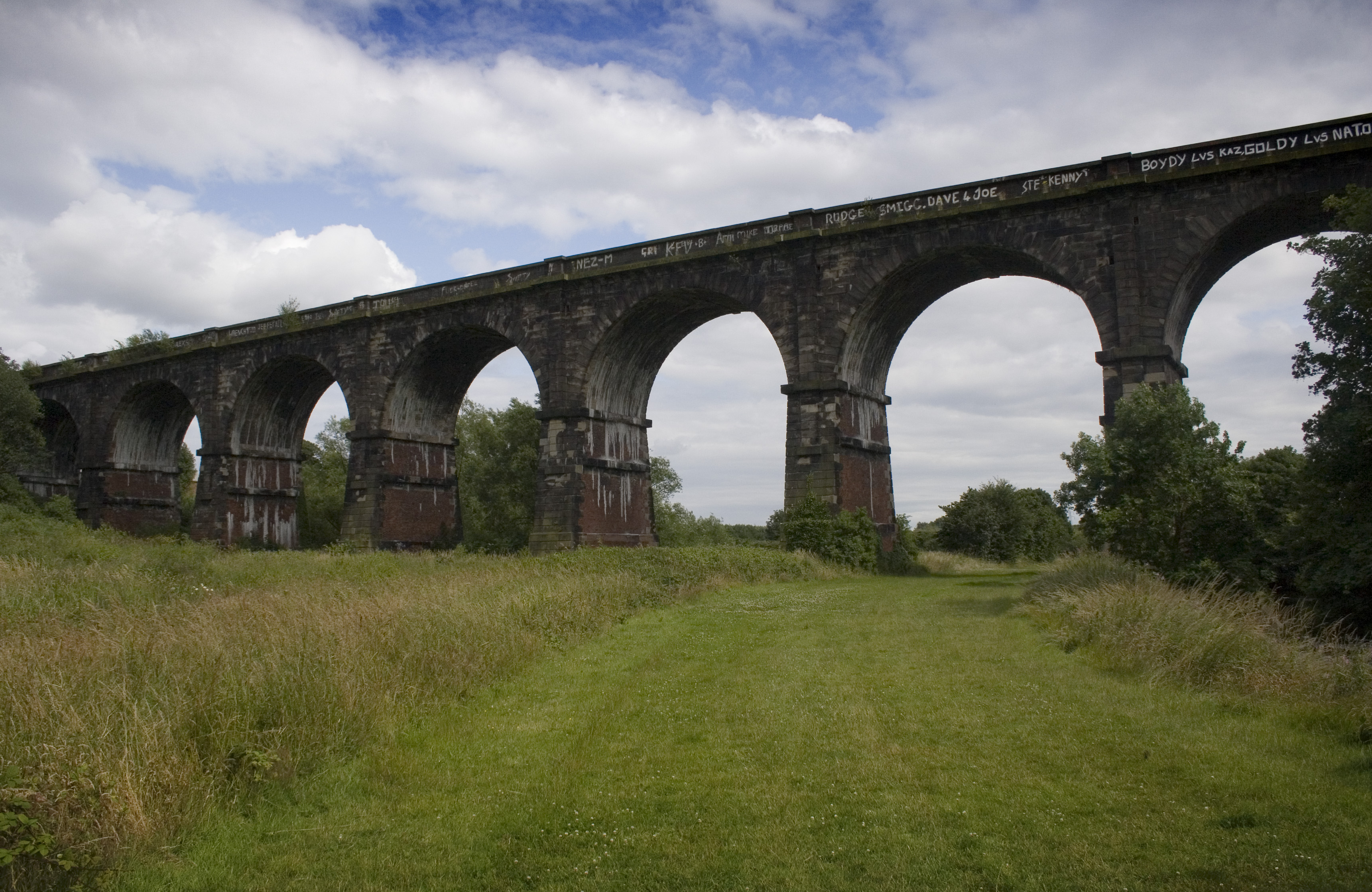
The Sankey Viaduct

The Sankey Viaduct railway viaduct over the Sankey Canal in Newton-le-Willows, known locally as the "Nine Arches" was completed in 1830. It is still in use and carries the intercity Liverpool to Manchester (via Rainhill and St Helens Junction) railway. It actually comprises nine sandstone arches, with a 60-foot (18.3m) minimum clearance above the canal, which was required to allow the masts of the Mersey flats to clear. Designated Grade I listed building in 1966, it has been described as being "the earliest major railway viaduct in the world".

A staircase lock was built on the Sankey Canal and a second staircase was built later when the Ravenhead Branch was constructed in 1775. They are known respectively as the Old Double Lock and the New Double Lock. The latter was restored by St. Helens Borough Council in 1992, although it has no navigable waterway either above or below it.

== See also ==
- Canals of the United Kingdom
- History of the British canal system

== Bibliography ==
- Cumberlidge, Jane (1998). Inland Waterways of Great Britain 7th Ed. Imray Laurie Norie and Wilson. ISBN 978-0-85288-355-6.
- Cumberlidge, Jane (2009). Inland Waterways of Great Britain 8th Ed. Imray Laurie Norie and Wilson. ISBN 978-1-84623-010-3.
- Higgins, Clement (1877). A Treatise on the Law Relating to the Pollution and Obstruction of Watercourses, Together With a Brief Summary of the various Sources of River Pollution (1st ed.). Bell Yard, Temple Bar, London, England.: Stevens and Haynes.
- Priestley, Joseph (1831). Historical Account of the Navigable Rivers, Canals, and Railways of Great Britain. Archived from the original on 3 March 2016.
- Skempton, Sir Alec (2002). A Biographical Dictionary of Civil Engineers in Great Britain and Ireland: 1500 to 1830. Thomas Telford. ISBN 978-0-7277-2939-2.
- Squires, Roger (2008). Britain's restored canals. Landmark Publishing. ISBN 978-1-84306-331-5.
