= Burtonwood =

Coordinates: 53.430153°N 2.661355°W

- Village
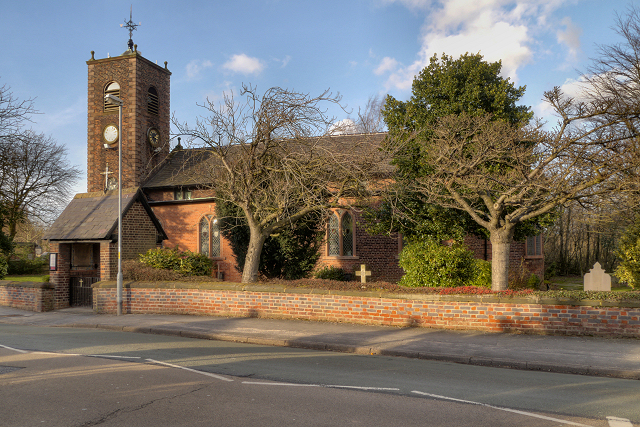
- St. Michael's Church, Burtonwood

- Location within Cheshire
- Population: 11,265
- OS grid reference: SJ561928
- Civil parish: Burtonwood and Westbrook
- Unitary authority: Warrington
- Ceremonial county: Cheshire
- Region: North West
- Country: England
- Sovereign state: United Kingdom
- Post town: WARRINGTON
- Postcode district: WA5
- Dialling code: 01925
- Police: Cheshire
- Fire: Cheshire
- Ambulance: North West
- UK Parliament: Warrington North

Burtonwood is a village in the civil parish of Burtonwood and Westbrook, in the Borough of Warrington, Cheshire, England. Within the boundaries of the historic county of Lancashire, the name Burtonwood is known worldwide as the location of the former RAF Station Burtonwood military camp. Burtonwood village itself is a few miles away from the site of the former station. The civil parish also includes Westbrook, which is a council ward and suburb of Warrington. At the 2001 census, the population of the civil parish was 11,265.

== History ==
Burtonwood was a chapelry in the ancient parish of Warrington, in the West Derby Hundred of Lancashire. It was later created a civil parish and was part of the Warrington Poor Law Union and then the Warrington Rural District. By 1974 the village of Burtonwood became part of Warrington District and is now part of the Warrington Unitary Authority. It is still a civil parish (now named Burtonwood and Westbrook) and thus has its own parish council. Burtonwood's population rose from 990 in 1861 to 2,408 in 1911 as the mining and brewing industries grew. The village of Burtonwood saw its greatest increase in housing and population post 1945 when the locally named 'miners estate' was built and vast numbers of people took employment in the collieries of Bold and Clockface both in the neighbouring Parish of Bold in St Helens. The population of the parish of Burtonwood continued to grow in 1951 partly due to the arrival of the United States Air Force (USAF) personnel and the but dropped from 8,238 to 4,899 in 1971, before rising to 11,265 today as a result of housing development on the old RAF station site. Nowadays, there is work being done on the station and two of the camps have been knocked down. This is because of the Omega Project.

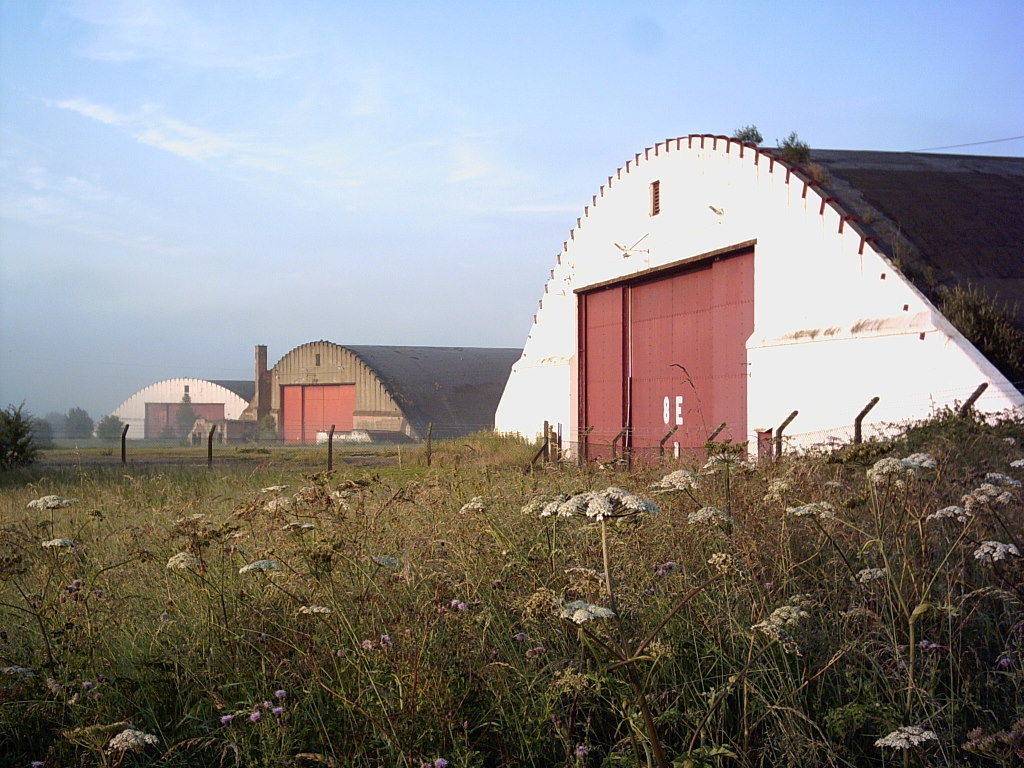
Burtonwood Air Base

RAF Burtonwood was mainly used by the United States Air Force between 1942 and closure of the main airfield in 1958 and was the biggest US airbase in Europe.

== Brewery ==
The village is known for its brewery, which brewed the Burtonwood ales. The brewery was founded in 1867, and built up a large estate of pubs. In 1964 Burtonwood Breweries became a public company, but retained its head office in the village. In 1998 the company formed a joint venture with Thomas Hardy Holdings, known as Thomas Hardy Burtonwood. Soon after the company stopped producing Burtonwood-brand beers and was then contracted for a short while to produce Brakspear ales. The brewery closed in September 2022. The brewery premises were then demolished.

== Facilities ==
Burtonwood had four pubs. Three that have since been demolished are The Bridge House Inn, The Elm Tree Inn, and The Limerick Hotel. The Bridge House Inn and the Elm Tree Inn were both owned by the Marstons Group, and were demolished in 2014. The first was located in Phipps lane built in the early 1900s, the second was located on the corner of Phipps Lane and Chapel Lane, built around 1885. The Limerick Hotel was located on what was Cow Lane, now Burtonwood Rd, built in 1911 and demolished in the early 1940s because the pub was too close, to the (fully operational) Burtonwood Air Base and runway. The Village currently has only one public house, the Chapel House since the Fiddle i'th Bag Inn closed in the 2020s. It has three social clubs and three churches, St. Michael's, St. Paul of the Cross and the Methodist church, Though the latter has since ceased services and was listed for sale in 2025.

The two primary schools are Burtonwood Community Primary School and St Paul of the Cross Primary School. The village does not have a secondary school or college and the nearest high school is Great Sankey High School, which has a sixth form attached to it. Also Hope Academy in nearby Newton-le-Willows and Priestley Sixth Form College in Warrington town centre is the nearest specialised sixth form college.

Burtonwood village also has two doctors' surgeries, known as Burtonwood Surgery on Clay Lane, and Kinnock Park Surgery. There is also a large Co-operative store brand new since 2018 (Chapel Lane), as you walk into the village there is a fish and chip shop, a Village Barbers, a beauty salon and a Lloyd's chemist and a post office, located on Chapel Lane.

There are two recreational parks. Burtonwood also has three nature reserves. Wheatacre Woods (access via Clay Lane / Gorsey Lane), the Old Colliery Moss (access via Bold Lane / Back Lane) and an area known as the Burtonwood Nature Park which is accessed primarily from the footpath adjacent to the bowling greens behind Burtonwood Community Centre.

More information can be found on the Burtonwood Village history on the Burtonwood Village Facebook site.

== Transport ==
The village is small, with only four bus routes through it, (Arriva North West 329 to St Helens, Warrington's Own Buses 24E to Newton Le-Willows which only runs through the village twice a day (subject to rural bus grant) and Ogden 141 (St Helens to Newton) run on behalf of Merseytravel). The nearest major bus interchanges are in Warrington (6 miles) and Wigan (8.19 miles). The nearest railway station was Collins Green, but is now St. Helens Junction, two miles to the north-west of the village. Liverpool John Lennon Airport is the nearest airport (10 miles to the west). Another bus company that operate services within the Burtonwood and surrounding areas is MD Buses who operate the 329 services alongside Arriva North West and the B29 service that runs from Collins Green to Europa Boulevard ( IKEA ) who are known for punctuality and reliability

== Statistics ==
=== Civil parish ===
The following statistics are for the civil parish of Burtonwood and Westbrook.

==== Population and gender ====
- Population: 11,265
- Population, Males: 5,554
- Population, Females: 5,711

==== Housing ====
- Total households: 4,264

=== Council ward ===
The following statistics are for the council ward of Burtonwood and Winwick.

==== Population and ethnicity ====
- Population: 5,595
- Population ratio (Male:Female): 49.2%:50.8%
- White origin: 98.48%
- Mixed origin: 0.00%
- Asian origin: 0.57%
- Black origin: 0.01%
- Other origin: 0.23%

==== Housing ====
- Total households: 2,400
- Owner occupied: 84.68%
- Shared ownership: 0.26%
- Council accommodation: 10.64%
- Housing association accommodation: 0.18%
- Other rented accommodation: 4.24%

== See also ==
- Listed buildings in Burtonwood and Westbrook
