= Warrington A.F.C. =

Association football club active at the turn of the 19th/20th century

- Full name: Warrington Association Football Club
- Founded: 1899
- Dissolved: 16 January 1902
- Ground: Warrington Cricket Field
- President: Councillor W. Pierpoint
- Secretary: 1899: T. P. Bradshaw; 1900: E. A. Connor
Home colours

Warrington A.F.C. was an association football club from Warrington, Lancashire.

== History ==
The first Warrington A.F.C. (normally referred to as Warrington Association) was founded in 1884. With the rugby football code dominant in the town, the club struggled to keep its head above water; in 1886 and 1887 its members faced claims in court for non-payment of bills, and in September 1893 the club was formally disbanded.

The club however was re-founded in 1899, and showed considerable ambition before the 1899–1900 season, joining the Lancashire Alliance, and signing (amongst others) Ted Connor of Preston North End and one Colour-Sergeant Jones from St Helens Recs, whom Aston Villa wanted to buy out of the Army, only for Warrington to beat it to the punch. Jones however did not remain with the club long - in November, as an Army reservist, he was called up for deployment to Enniskillen, the club presenting him with a travelling bag.

After a season in which the club made a profit of 14s 6½d from an income of £207 8s, and finished mid-table in the Alliance, the club resolved to join the Combination league in 1900, and finished the season 10th out of 12, but also winners of the Warrington Cup, thanks to a win over Newton-le-Willows in front of 3,000 at Earlestown.

Despite this success, the club had suffered a loss of £45 over the season, and took a step up to join the higher status Lancashire League for the 1901–02 season, in the hope of attracting higher crowds. However the club ran out of money before the season ended; in January 1902, with a loss of £15 likely to increase to £50 before the season end, it resolved to wind itself up. In February 1902, it tendered its resignation to the League, which was accepted, and the club's record was expunged. At the time, the club had only won one of its 14 games (against Haydock in December 1901, coming from 3–1 down to win 4–3) and drawn 2, and had only scored 9 goals, conceding 38; it was bottom of the table, a point behind Bacup.

== Colours ==
The club colours were amber and black, with an alternate kit of white.

== Ground ==
The club played at the Warrington Cricket Field.
