= Westbrook, Cheshire =

Suburb of Warrington, England

Coordinates: 53.4062°N 2.6295°W

Westbrook
- Location within Cheshire
- Population: 11,265 (2015)
- OS grid reference: SJ581901
- Civil parish: Burtonwood and Westbrook
- Unitary authority: Warrington
- Ceremonial county: Cheshire
- Region: North West
- Country: England
- Sovereign state: United Kingdom
- Post town: Warrington
- Postcode district: WA5
- Dialling code: 01925
- Police: Cheshire
- Fire: Cheshire
- Ambulance: North West
- UK Parliament: Warrington North

Westbrook is a ward and suburb in north west Warrington, in the Warrington district, in the ceremonial county of Cheshire, England. Within the boundaries of the historic county of Lancashire, it forms part of the civil parish of Burtonwood and Westbrook, to part of which it gives its name. The main part of Westbrook was built in the early 1980s. There are new estates being developed, the newest (Chapelford) was started in 2001.

== Facilities ==
The original estate (area around Westbrook Crescent and Cromwell Avenue) has an out of town shopping area. The shopping centre is known as the "Westbrook Centre", and has a large Asda supermarket as well as many smaller specialist stores. Westbrook also has an Odeon cinema adjacent to the shopping centre.

There are two primary schools in Westbrook, St Phillips C of E Primary School and Old Hall Primary School, the nearest high schools are St. Gregory's Catholic High School and Great Sankey High School.

There are various pubs in the district. There are also playing fields and parkland. Sankey Valley Park is also a short distance away.

== Travel ==
The centre of Westbrook is served by many buses. On average the journey to Warrington takes 14 to 22 minutes depending on route. The buses serving Westbrook are the 17 and 18 direct to Warrington town centre (18E in evening), and the 13, 29A, 29C via Chapelford.

== Demographics ==
Note: Statistics expressed as percentages may not add up to 100%

=== Politics ===
It is in the Westbrook ward of Warrington borough. There are two councillors, both representing the Labour Party.

=== Census data ===
Data is based on that of Westbrook Ward.

==== Population ====
- Total Population: 6,450 residents
- Male:Female ratio: 49.7%:50.3%
- Average age of population: 34.7 years

===== Ethnicity breakdown =====
- 95.3% White
- 0.6% Mixed
- 0.1% Black
- 2.6% Asian
- 1.4% Other

==== Housing and social situation ====
===== Housing situation =====
- Households: 2,294
  - 92.4% are owner occupied
  - 3.9% are socially rented (i.e. Council Accommodation)
  - 3.7% are privately rented
  - 0.3% are rent free
- Average House Price: £111,855

===== Social situation =====
- Population Density: 14.8 residents per hectare
- 72.1% of residents say this ward is a "Wealthy" area (based on ACORN index)
- Based on the Index of Multiple Deprivation, this is ranked as a "very above average" (in terms of economics) in Warrington, with an index of around 90.0%.
- 3.9% of residents are on some form of benefits.
- 2.5% of households are classed as overcrowded.

==== Employment and education ====
===== Employment =====
- 63.6% are employed.
- 1.7% are unemployed.
- 3.5% are full-time students (therefore classed as active).
- 21.2% are classed as "economically inactive".

===== Education =====
- 16.7% have no qualifications whatsoever.
- 52.7% have only level 1 or 2 qualifications.
- 25.1% have level 3 or higher (i.e. non-compulsory qualifications).

== See also ==
- Listed buildings in Burtonwood and Westbrook
