= The Railway Viaduct =

2006 novel by Edward Marston

- A Detective Inspector Colbeck Mystery
- Author: Edward Marston (Keith Miles)
- Language: English
- Series: Railway Detective
- Genre: Detective, Mystery novel
- Publisher: Allison & Busby
- Publication date: 2006
- Publication place: United Kingdom
- Media type: Print (hardcover)
- Pages: 319 pp (hardcover edition)
- ISBN: 978-0-7490-8114-0
- Preceded by: The Excursion Train
- Followed by: The Iron Horse

The Railway Viaduct is the third title in the Railway Detective series of detective mystery novels written by Keith Miles under the pseudonym Edward Marston. Set in 1852, it is about a murder on a train which is investigated and ultimately solved by two Scotland Yard detectives, Inspector Robert Colbeck and Sergeant Victor Leeming. The title place is the Sankey Viaduct on the former Liverpool and Manchester Railway. The novel was published in 2006 by Allison & Busby of London. The graphic on the book cover is from T. T. Bury's 1831 depiction called Viaduct across the Sankey Valley in his Liverpool and Manchester Railway series of paintings. According to the publishers in a 2018 news release, the series has been optioned for television adaptation by Mammoth Screen.

== Plot introduction ==
A French railway engineer is killed on a train crossing the Sankey Viaduct and his body is flung over the parapet into the canal below.

== Plot summary ==
Inspector Robert Colbeck, Sergeant Victor Leeming and their former colleague Brendan Mulryne follow the trail to France where they meet Thomas Brassey, whose construction of the Mantes to Caen railway is being sabotaged. First Leeming and then Mulryne must pose as navvies to unravel a conspiracy.

== Characters in "The Railway Viaduct" ==
=== Main characters (all recurring) ===
For a full description of the main characters, who all recur throughout the series, see The Railway Detective.

- Robert Colbeck – A detective inspector working for the Metropolitan Police Force (the Met) at Scotland Yard, London. He is the eponymous "Railway Detective".
- Victor Leeming – A detective sergeant at Scotland Yard who is Colbeck's assistant.
- Edward Tallis – The detective superintendent who is in charge of the Detective Department at Scotland Yard.
- Madeleine Andrews – A talented artist who is Colbeck's love interest. She frequently assists him in his investigations.
- Caleb Andrews – Father of Madeleine. He is an engine driver with the London and North Western Railway (L&NWR).
- Brendan Mulryne – Huge, jovial Irishman who was a police officer himself until being discharged by Tallis for brawling. He remains a close friend of Colbeck and Leeming.
- Estelle Leeming – Wife of Victor and mother of their two children. An unseen character in this book.

=== Other characters ===
- Thomas Brassey – A key character in the novel which largely concerns his construction of the Mantes to Caen railway in Normandy.

== Historical references ==
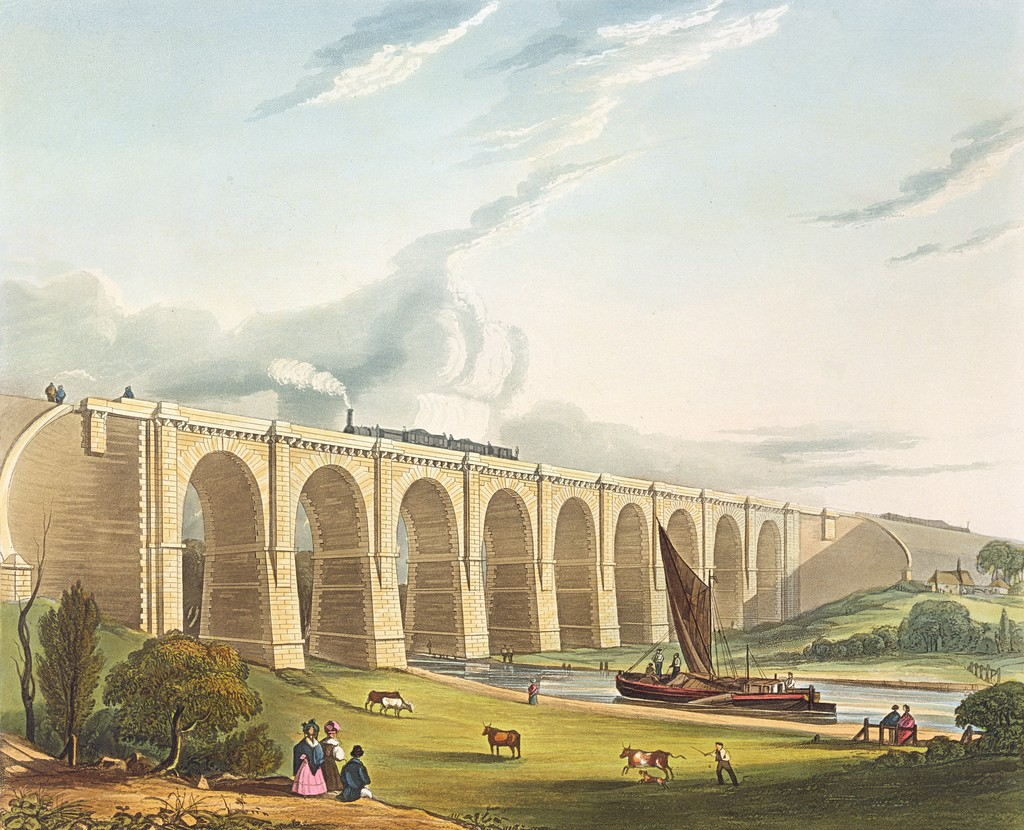
T. T. Bury's Viaduct across the Sankey Valley (1831)

The Detective Department of the Metropolitan Police Force (the Met) was founded in 1842 and so was only ten years old in 1852, when the story is set.
