= Earlestown Town Hall =

Municipal building in Earlestown, Merseyside, England

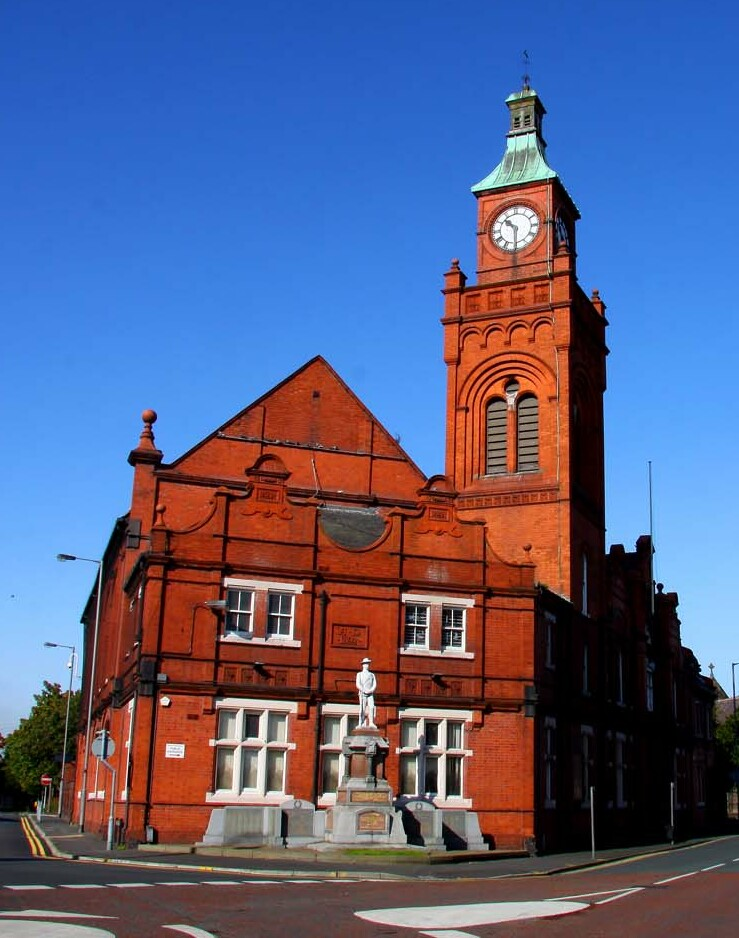
- Earlestown Town Hall

- Shown in Merseyside
- 53.4530°N 2.6434°W
- Location: Market Street, Earlestown

History
- Built: 1893

Site notes
- Architect: Thomas Beesley
- Architectural style: Queen Anne style

Listed Building – Grade II
- Official name: Earlestown Town Hall
- Designated: 3 July 2008
- Reference no.: 1392639

Earlestown Town Hall is a municipal building in Market Street in Earlestown, Merseyside, England. The building, which was the headquarters of Newton-le-Willows Urban District Council, is a Grade II listed building.

== History ==
In the late 1880s the town improvement commissioners, who were based in the old assembly hall in the High Street in Newton-le-Willows, decided to procure a new public hall for Earlestown. The building was financed in part by a donation of land together with a gift of £500 from the lord of the manor, Lord Newton. It was designed by Thomas Beesley in the Queen Anne style, built in red brick by R. Neill & Sons of Manchester at a cost of £10,200 and opened in December 1893. The design involved an asymmetrical main frontage with seven bays facing onto Market Street; the central section of three bays featured a round headed doorway with a stained glass fanlight flanked by pilasters and brackets supporting a curved balcony and by full-height octagonal turrets. There was a French door on the first floor with a lunette window above surmounted by a shaped pediment containing a blank roundel. The left hand section contained a five-stage tower with a belfry in the fourth stage and a clock in the fifth stage. The quarter-chiming clock was designed and manufactured by Potts of Leeds. Internally, the principal rooms, which were both on the first floor, were the main hall on the south side of the building and the mayor's parlour on the northeast side.

After significant population growth, largely associated with the growth of the Earlestown Wagon Works, the Newton-le-Willows area became an urban district in 1895. As the centre of gravity of Newton-le-Willows moved to the west, the new building became the main town hall for the whole of Newton-le-Willows. A war memorial to commemorate local service personnel who had died in the Second Boer War, in the form of a stone figure of a soldier on a plinth, was designed by the local firm of Dring & Manchester and was built by Scott & Prescott of St Helens: it was unveiled by Lord Newton on 29 April 1905.

During the Second World War, the Home Guard took over the basement. A sandstone tablet commemorating the life of the locally-born soldier, Company Quartermaster Sergeant Norman Harvey, who was awarded the Victoria Cross for his actions while serving with the Royal Inniskilling Fusiliers in Belgium in October 1918 and who had died in the Second World War, was installed in the pavement in front of the war memorial after the end of the war. Performers at the town hall in the post-war period included the rock band, The Beatles, who took part in a concert on 30 November 1962. An extension at the rear of the building was constructed in the 1960s.

The building continued to serve as the headquarters of the Newton-le-Willows Urban District Council for much of the 20th century but ceased to be the local seat of government after the enlarged St Helens Metropolitan District Council was formed in 1974. It was subsequently used as workspace for the delivery of local services by the district council but closed completely in 2008. As part of longer term plans to bring the building back into use, the 1960s extension was demolished in August 2020.

== See also ==
- Listed buildings in St Helens, Merseyside
