= Newton-le-Willows F.C. =

Newton-le-Willows
- Full name: Newton-le-Willows Football Club
- Founded: 1885
- Dissolved: 1911
- Ground: Pied Bull Ground
Home colours

Newton-le-Willows F.C. was an association football club from Newton-le-Willows, Lancashire, active at the start of the 20th century.

== History ==
The earliest record of the club is from the 1885–86 season, and it played mostly low-key local matches for its first decade. The club appeared to have won the Warrington Cup in 1897–98, with a 4–3 win over Witton Albion in the final. However Witton protested that one of the Newton players (Richard Lee) was ineligible, having only joined from Earlestown in April, and the protest was sustained; Witton won the replay 1–0 in extra-time at Dalton Bank, after an early Newtonian penalty was saved.

Newton joined the Liverpool Combination in time for the 1898–99 season. Two years later joined a league with a wider remit, namely The Combination, which covered much of the north-west of England. The club struggled at this higher level, finishing at or near the bottom of the table in its three seasons in the competition; a rare highlight was finishing as runner-up to Warrington A.F.C. in the Warrington Cup in 1901.

Before the 1903–04 season, the Combination was merged with the Lancashire League, and the club was placed in the second division in the new format. The step-up entitled the club to enter the FA Cup, and it did so for the first time in 1905–06, losing to Earlestown in a first qualifying round replay.

The new format did not give much respite to the club - after one mid-table finish, the club hovered around the bottom of the table for the next three seasons, surviving re-election by four votes in 1905, and in 1907–08 finished last out of 20 clubs. The club applied for re-election once more, but did not turn up to the annual general meeting to present its case, and duly failed to obtain re-admission.

As a result, the club dropped into the Lancashire Alliance league for 1908–09, but struggled once more towards the bottom of the table, and it is last recorded playing at the end of 1910. The club had continued to enter the FA Cup until 1910–11, and never won a tie.

There was a brief revival of the club after the First World War and a current club plays in the Cheshire Association Football League.

== Colours ==
The club wore red and white striped jerseys.

== Ground ==
The club's ground was the Pied Bull Ground, behind the hotel of the same name, off Golborne Road. The highest known attendance was the "nearly 6,000" who saw the home side lose a derby to Earlestown 6–3 on 31 October 1903.
