= Listed buildings in Burtonwood and Westbrook =

Burtonwood and Westbrook is a civil parish in the Borough of Warrington in Cheshire, England, northwest of the town of Warrington. It contains eight buildings that are recorded in the National Heritage List for England as designated listed buildings. The parish includes the village of Burtonwood, and Westbrook, a suburb of the town of Warrington; otherwise it is rural. The original Liverpool to Manchester railway line runs through the north of the parish, and provides it with its only Grade I listed structure, the Sankey Viaduct. The other listed buildings are a church, two country houses, a gatehouse, and four farmhouses.

== Key ==
Grade	Criteria
Grade I	Buildings of exceptional interest, sometimes considered to be internationally important.
Grade II*	Particularly important buildings of more than special interest.
Grade II	Buildings of national importance and special interest.

== Buildings ==
Name and location	Photograph	Date	Notes	Grade
Collins Green Farmhouse; 53.4444°N 2.6649°W	—	Medieval	The farmhouse originated as a timber-framed building, which was remodelled in the 17th century, with the addition of another wing. It was encased in brick in the 18th and 19th centuries, and further alterations were made in the 20th century. The older wing has 1 1/2 storeys, and the later wing has 2 1/2. Retained in the interior are features from each stage of the building's development, including some timber-framing, a medieval seven-light timber diamond mullioned window, moulded beams, and a dog-leg staircase.	II
Gatehouse to Bradley (or Bradlegh) Old Hall; 53.44013°N 2.64622°W		c. 1460	The gatehouse to the hall, now partly in ruins. It is constructed in sandstone, forming an archway above the entrance to the drive. The surviving features include the arch, which is four-centred with colonnettes (small columns), the springers of the fallen vault, and octagonal canted mock turrets supported by buttresses at the four corners.	II*
Bewsey Old Hall; 53.4013°N 2.6170°W		Late 16th century	The hall underwent alterations during the 17th to the 19th centuries, and was restored and partly rebuilt in the 20th century, but only a fragment of the original hall has survived. What does survive has an L-shaped plan, and is in three storeys. It is constructed in brick with stone dressings and slate roofs, and has mullioned or mullioned and transomed windows. The moated site on which the hall stands is a scheduled monument.	II*
Bradley (or Bradlegh); Old Hall; 53.4398°N 2.6464°W		Late 16th century	Originating as a farmhouse, it was cased in brick in the late 18th century. The house has sandstone fittings and quoins, and stands on a sandstoneplinth, Parts of the walls are pebbledashed and other parts are slate-hung. The roofs have stone slates. The house is in two storeys plus attics, and incorporates dormers. The windows are sashes. The interior includes two altered inglenooks, and an inscribed beam including the date 1597. The moated site on which the house stands is a scheduled monument.	II
Causeway Bridges Farmhouse; 53.4243°N 2.6224°W	—	1646	The farmhouse has been altered and extended. It is constructed in brick with slate roofs, and consists of a main wing and a cross wing. The building is in two storeys, and contains sash windows. Inside the farmhouse is a dog-leg staircase.	II
St Michael's Church, Burtonwood; 53.4307°N 2.6559°W		1716	The south aisle was added in 1939 by Edwin J. Dod, and the church was rebuilt in 1984 following mining subsidence. It is constructed in brick with stone dressings. The nave has a slate roof and there is a copper roof on the aisle. The church has a west tower and a small apsidal chancel. Inside the church are remnants of a pew inscribed with the date 1610. The stained glass is a memorial to RAF Burtonwood dated 1988.	II
Bewsey Old Hall Farmhouse; 53.4014°N 2.6172°W	—	Mid 18th century	Attached to the west of Bewsey Old Hall, the farmhouse was altered during the 19th century. It is constructed in brick with a slate roof, and has two storeys. On its west side is a two-storey lean-to, also in brick with a slate roof, and with sash windows.	II
Sankey Viaduct; 53.44759°N 2.65018°W		1828–30	The first railway viaduct to be built in the world, it was designed by George Stephenson for the Liverpool and Manchester Railway Company to carry the railway across the Sankey Valley. It is constructed in brick faced with sandstone ashlar. The viaduct is carried on nine semicircular arches.	I
