= Mersey flat =

Type of doubled-ended barge

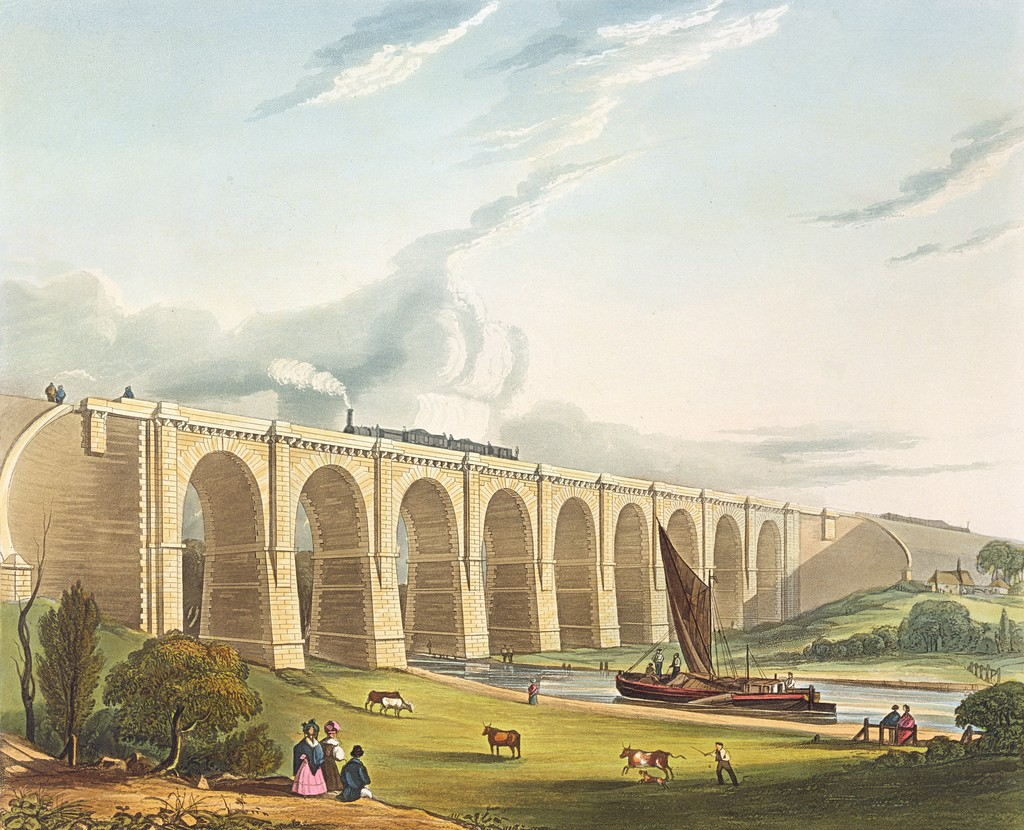
A Mersey flat on the Sankey Canal, approaching the Sankey Viaduct (1831)

A Mersey flat is a type of double-ended barge, that were commonly used on the River Mersey.

== Construction ==
Traditionally, the hull was built of oak and the deck was pitch pine. Some had a single mast, with a fore-and-aft rig, while some had an additional mizzen mast. Despite having a flat bottom and curved sides, they were quite stable. They were common from the 1730s to 1890s.

The length of a flat was from 62 to 70 feet (19 to 21 m) long, with a 6-foot (1.8 m) draught and a beam of 14 feet 9 inches to 17 feet (4.5 to 5.2 m). They could carry up to 80 tons of cargo, and this size allowed them to work along the Bridgewater Canal, the Sankey Canal and the northern parts of the Shropshire Union Canal. The Weaver flat was a larger version of the Mersey flat, measuring 90 by 21 feet (27.4 by 6.4 m). Its draught was 10.5 feet (3.2 m) and when fully loaded, could carry 250 tons.

== Naming ==
As the name suggests, these flats originated on the River Mersey, but they were also used on the rivers Irwell and Weaver.

== Usage ==
Most Mersey flats had been converted to dumb barges by the end of the 19th century, towed by horses or by steam tugs. The larger Weaver flats were fitted with steam engines, and later with diesel engines, although there were still around 20 working by sail in 1935. Both the Liverpool Maritime Museum and the Ellesmere Port Museum have a Mersey flat in their collections, neither of which actually worked under sail.

== See also ==
- Thames sailing barge
