= Sankey Viaduct =

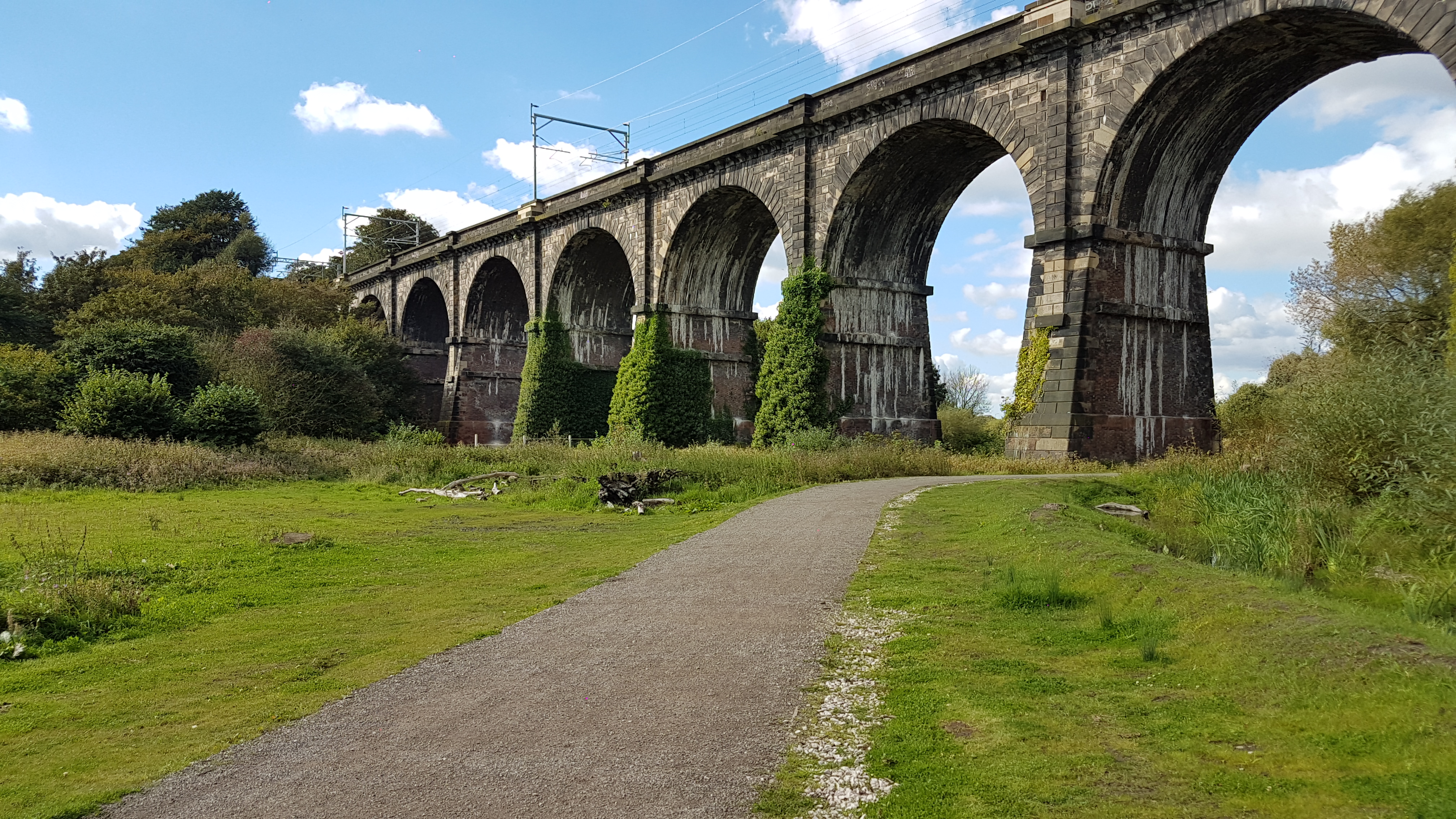
- The Sankey Viaduct in 2016 with the overhead line equipment for electric trains visible
- Coordinates: 53.44745°N 2.65076°W
- OS grid reference: SJ5682394761
- Carries: Liverpool and Manchester Railway
- Crosses: Sankey Brook (historic route of the Sankey Canal)
- Other name: The Nine Arches
- Heritage status: Grade I
- ID number: 1075927

Characteristics
- Material: Yellow sandstone and red brick
- Total length: 600 feet (180 m)
- Height: 70 feet (21 m)
- No. of spans: Nine

Rail characteristics
- No. of tracks: 2
- Track gauge: Standard-gauge railway
- Electrified: 2015

History
- Architect: George Stephenson
- Construction start: 1828
- Construction cost: £45,000
- Opened: 1830

Location
- Interactive map of Sankey Viaduct

The Sankey Viaduct (locally known as the Nine Arches) is a railway viaduct in Newton-le-Willows in North West England. The majority of the viaduct is located within the borough of St Helens, Merseyside, with approximately a third to west of Sankey Brook being located within the borough of Warrington, Cheshire. It is a designated Grade I listed building and has been described as being "the earliest major railway viaduct in the world".

In 1826, the Liverpool and Manchester Railway Company (L&MR) was authorised to construct the world's first intercity railway. One obstacle on the selected 31-mile (50 km) route between Liverpool and Manchester was the Sankey Valley. The company's principal engineer, George Stephenson, designed the Sankey Viaduct for the double-track railway to traverse the valley and Sankey Canal with sufficient clearance for the masts and sails of the Mersey flats that used the canal.

The viaduct was built between 1828 and 1830, although work on the structure did not finish until the middle of 1833. On 15 September 1830, the viaduct was opened along with the Liverpool & Manchester railway. In 2015, Network Rail installed overhead line equipment as part of a wider electrification programme.

== History ==
=== Background ===
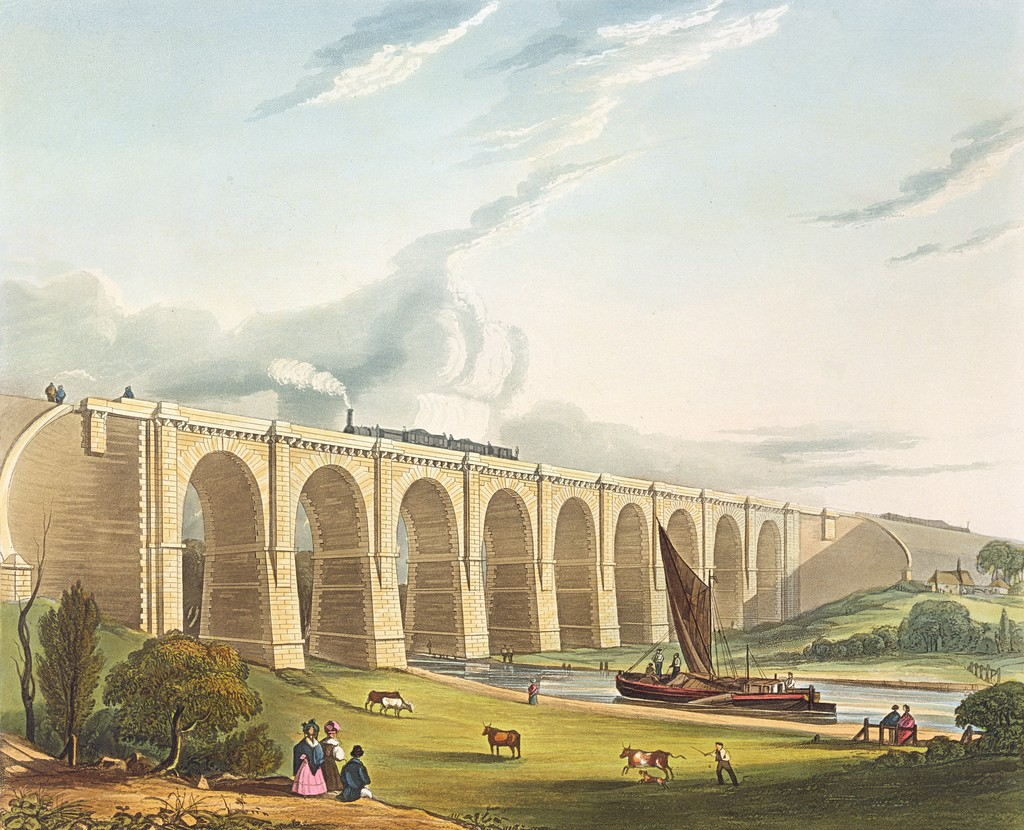
1831 view of the Viaduct

In 1826, the Act for the Liverpool & Manchester Railway (L&MR), the world's first intercity railway, was passed by Parliament. George Stephenson was the company's principal engineer for the 31-mile (50 km) route between Liverpool and Manchester. The route required crossing the Sankey valley west of Newton-le-Willows, about halfway along the line.

The Sankey valley contained two obstacles, the Sankey Brook and the Sankey Canal that was constructed to link the St Helens coalfield to the River Mersey. The engineered waterway could be regarded as the first canal built in England since Roman times.

To traverse the Sankey Valley, Stephenson had to devise a route for the railway to pass without obstructing barges on the canals and maintain gradients for steam locomotives using the route. The Sankey Brook Navigation Company objected to the Liverpool & Manchester Railway's intended route and insisted that any structure across the valley must provide a minimum clearance of 60 feet (18 m) above the water to allow fully-rigged Mersey flats to pass underneath.

Stephenson's solution was to construct an embankment on the west side of the valley, roughly 900 yards (820 m) long, and then cross the brook and the canal on a viaduct that met a smaller embankment on the eastern side. Stephenson designed the viaduct in conjunction with Thomas Longridge Gooch, his chief draughtsman. Constructed from yellow sandstone and red brick, the viaduct is of nine round-headed arches carried on piers that incline sharply from the base towards the top. Its form is similar to the traditional designs of canal aqueducts.

=== Construction ===
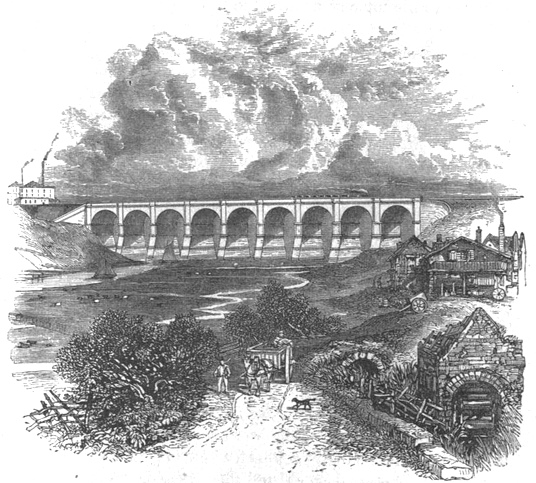
Etching of the Sankey Viaduct, 1868

Work commenced on the embankment for the western approach in June 1827. The embankment was constructed of more than 100,000 tons of clay, marl and moss, which was compacted with brushwood. The clay was excavated from the sides of the valley. On completion, trees were planted to provide a natural camouflage for the structure. During the first half of 1828, William Allcard (1809–61) was appointed resident engineer for the mid-section of the Liverpool & Manchester railway, which included the Sankey Viaduct and Kenyon cutting.

In spring 1828, work commenced on piling for the viaduct's foundations, which was necessary because of the soft conditions of the ground. The splayed bases of the viaduct's piers are built on sandstone foundation slabs, which was quarried from the nearby Olive Mount Cutting. Each slab was founded on top of around 200 timber piles, which were between 20 and 30 feet (6.1 and 9.1 m) long.

In summer 1829, the piers were completed and work began on the superstructure. By February 1830, the parapet walls had been completed. The cost of the viaduct, which was known locally as the Nine Arches Viaduct, was between £45,200 and £46,000.

On 15 September 1830, the viaduct was opened with the Liverpool & Manchester railway. Before its formal opening, a number of passengers had been transported across on special excursion trains. In July 1833, work on the structure included the addition of copings to the parapet walls.

The viaduct stands between 60 and 70 feet (18 and 21 m) above Sankey Brook. It has nine semicircular arches of 50 feet (15 m) span, 25 feet (7.6 m) rise, and is of red brick with yellow sandstone facings. The arches are supported on eight rectangular piers and abutments at either end of the structure. The curved wing walls of the abutments retain the ends of the embankments. Projecting pilasters form rectangular cutwaters, which extend up the face of the piers to form part of the parapet walls. The width between the parapets is 25 feet (7.6 m).

The retaining walls of the western embankment have been strengthened by the addition of stay bolts, which extend deep inside the embankment and bolt fixings set onto the faces of the retaining walls. Concrete has been applied to some of the vertical pilasters and areas of the masonry.

In 1931, the Sankey Canal was abandoned north of the viaduct. In 1963, the last navigable section closed and the waterway was subsequently infilled; the canal beneath the viaduct was infilled in 2002.

In February 1966, the viaduct received Grade I listed building status, attributed to its "international significance being the earliest major railway viaduct in the world".

During the first half of 2015, Network Rail installed overhead line equipment for the line's electrification.

== In popular culture ==
The Sankey Viaduct is the scene of an 1852 murder in The Railway Viaduct (2006), a detective mystery novel by Keith Miles writing as Edward Marston.

== See also ==
- Grade I and II* listed buildings in Warrington
- Grade I listed buildings in Merseyside
- Listed buildings in St Helens, Merseyside
- Listed buildings in Burtonwood and Westbrook
- North West England electrification schemes
