= Earlestown =

Town in Merseyside, England

Coordinates: 53.45°N 2.65°W

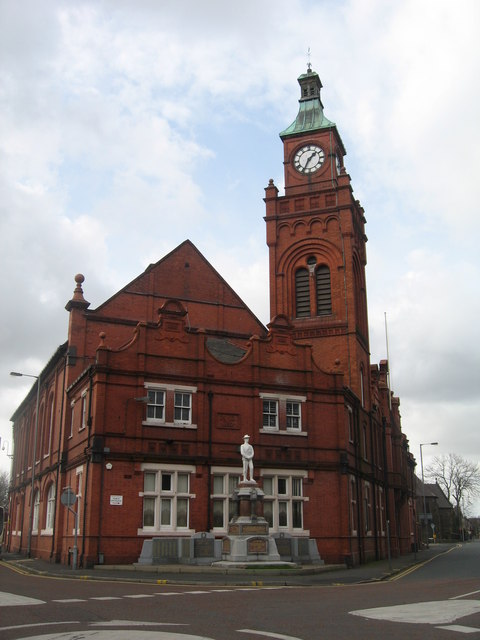
- Earlestown Town Hall

- Location within Merseyside
- Population: 10,830 (2011 Census)
- OS grid reference: SJ569949
- Metropolitan borough: St Helens
- Metropolitan county: Merseyside
- Region: North West
- Country: England
- Sovereign state: United Kingdom
- Post town: NEWTON LE WILLOWS
- Postcode district: WA12
- Dialling code: 01925
- Police: Merseyside
- Fire: Merseyside
- Ambulance: North West
- UK Parliament: St Helens North

Earlestown (/ɜːrlztaʊn/ URLZ-town) is a town contiguous with Newton-le-Willows in the Metropolitan Borough of St Helens, Merseyside, England. At the 2011 Census the town had a population of 10,830. The town's name is derived from Hardman Earle, a businessman and director of the London and North Western Railway who established a railway workshop here.

== History ==
Within the boundaries of the historic county of Lancashire, Earlestown is named after Sir Hardman Earle (11 July 1792 – 25 January 1877.) He was a senior and long-standing director of the London and North Western Railway (L&NWR).

In July 1831, the Warrington and Newton Railway was opened, less than six months after the Liverpool and Manchester Railway began service. A railway station was built at the junction of the two railways, a mile west of the town of Newton in Makerfield, now Newton-le-Willows, and was given the name Newton Junction.

In 1853 the L&NWR leased the Viaduct Foundry from Jones & Potts who had built locomotives there but had ceased trading in 1852. The L&NWR subsequently purchased the site outright in 1860, it became the Earlestown wagon works. (Note: The works were originally the Earlestown carriage and wagon works but carriage manufacturing was transferred to Saltney in 1860 and wagon manufacturing and repair work was centralised at Earlestown.) The foundry was adjacent to the railway on its north side between the station and the Sankey Canal In 1855 the works and the new town that sprang up next to it was named Earlestown in honour of the L&NWR's senior director Hardman Earle who had been instrumental in setting up the works. (Note: The works eventually grew to 36 acres and employed 2,000, the railway company itself built 340 houses.)

In 1861 the station was renamed Earlestown Junction. The suffix junction was officially dropped on 5 June 1950 though Earlestown had been used earlier than this on London, Midland and Scottish Railway (LMS) tickets.

Locomotive building was concentrated in another area within Newton-le-Willows. Between 1833 and 1956, the Vulcan Foundry produced some 6,210 steam locomotives to become the fourth largest builder of steam locomotives in the country, almost 70% of which were exported. Vulcan Foundry received its final steam locomotive order in 1954 and from then on built diesel and electric locomotives until closing in 2002.

Other significant (non-railway) employers in the town included Sankey Sugar, and T&T Vicars, who produced biscuit manufacturing equipment. There were also the nearby Lyme and Wood pits, located in neighbouring village of Haydock.

== Community ==
Newton-le-Willows has held a market by Royal Charter since the 14th century. By the 1890s, the Earlestown area of Newton-le-Willows had outgrown the older part of the town and so the market was moved to its current location in Earlestown and the market square is the town's centre-piece. Today trading takes place on Friday, with a mixed flea market/car boot sale every Saturday. The Saturday Market features many regular traders selling tools, clothing, antiques, records, DVDs, model railways, wartime memorabilia as well as cheap house clearance and bric-a-brac.

Earlestown Town Hall is an imposing building, fronted by a war memorial. In 1962 the Beatles visited Earlestown for a night gig and played at the town hall. On the same night Newton Boys Club on Graffton Street was opened by Frankie Vaughan for the local community.

Another significant building included the art-deco former Curzon cinema which was demolished in January 2010.

Earlestown's town centre includes high-street outlets such as Tesco, Boots, Wilko and several high street banks alongside independent retailers, bookmakers and fast-food takeaways. There are a range of traditional pubs, such as The New Market, The Ram's Head, The Railway Inn, The Griffin, and The Wellington. Earlestown is served by many fast food outlets offering a good range of Indian and Chinese dishes as well as fish and chips and the ubiquitous McDonald's. Most of the local restaurants are curry houses; Earlestown's 'curry quarter-of-a-mile' on Queen Street has three Indian restaurants and a Tandoori take-away.

== Governance ==
Newton-le-Willows is part of the Parliamentary constituency of St Helens North. At the 2024 general election, David Baines was elected to this seat.

Earlestown is one of two council wards within Newton-le-Willows.

== Transport ==
Due to its role in the history of rail travel, Earlestown has good rail connections with its railway station having frequent services to Liverpool, Manchester, Warrington and North Wales. Earlestown is also well located as far as the road network is concerned, being close to junction 9 of the M62 motorway, junctions 21A, 22 and 23 of the M6 motorway, and the A580 East Lancashire Manchester-Liverpool road.

== See also ==
- St John the Baptist's Church, Earlestown
- The K's, an Earlestown rock band, whose 2024 album peaked at number three in the album charts

== Gallery ==
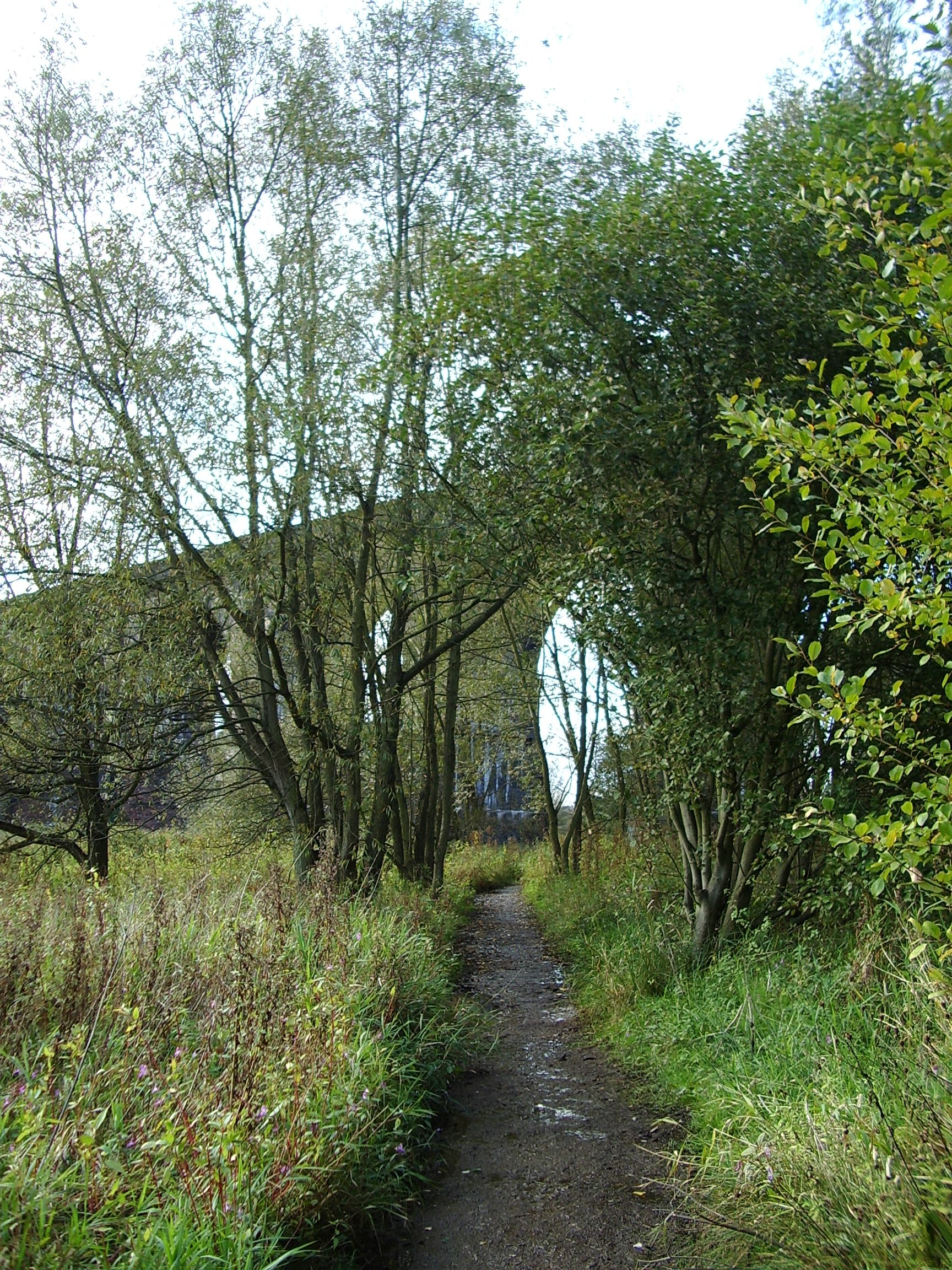
Sankey Viaduct seen from the Sankey Valley Country Park.

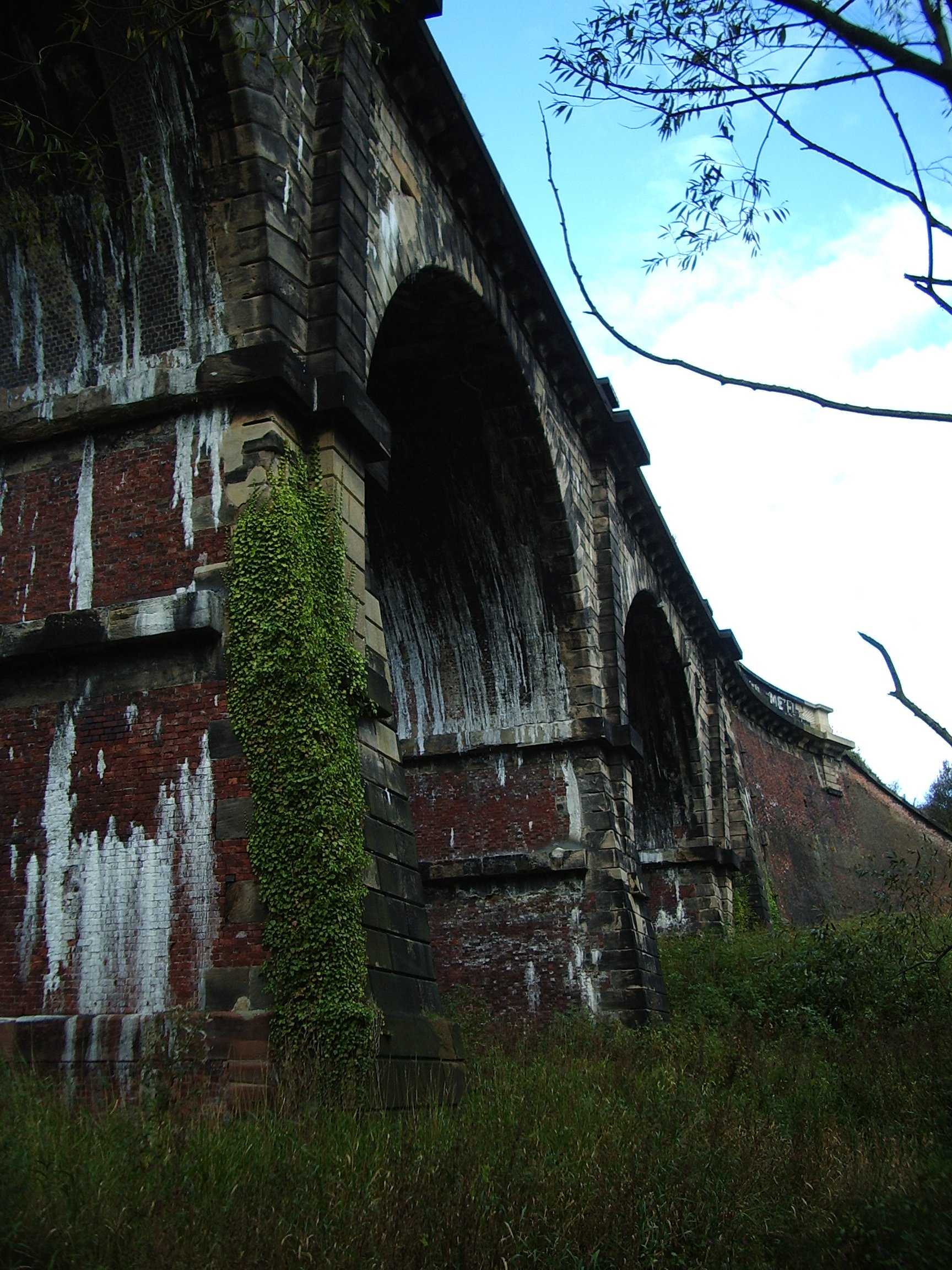
Detail of the viaduct from third arch.
