= Banastre =

Banastre may refer to:

- Adam Banastre, English disaffected knight who led the 1315 Banastre Rebellion
- Alard Banastre, High Sheriff of Oxfordshire in 1174 and 1176
- Christopher Banastre, High Sheriff of Lancashire in 1670
- Thomas Banastre (c. 1334–1379), English knight and soldier
- Thomas Banastre (MP), MP for Lancashire (UK Parliament constituency) in 1314
- William Banastre, English politician, MP for Lancashire in 1305
- Banastre family who constructed Bank Hall in 1608 (family also known as 'Banastre de Banke')
- Banastre Maynard, 3rd Baron Maynard (c. 1642–1718), English politician
- Banastre Parker (1696–1738), father-in-law of John Tarleton (slave trader) (1718–1773)
- Banastre Tarleton (1754–1833), British general and politician, noted for service in the American War of Independence
