= Earlestown F.C. (1945) =

Earlestown
- Full name: Earlestown Football Club
- Founded: 1945
- Dissolved: 1963
- Ground: Vista Park
Home colours

Earlestown Football Club was an association football club from Earlestown in Lancashire.

== History ==
The club was formed in 1945 and played in the Liverpool County Combination's first division for four years, winning the league title in 1947–48. After this, they joined the Lancashire Combination second division in 1949.

The club was promoted in its first season, and promptly relegated; it was promoted a second time in 1958–59. Its best finish in the competition was 13th (out of 22) in the first division in 1961–62. In the FA Cup it never got beyond the second qualifying round.

In 1960, the club was ambitious enough to sign Wilf Mannion as player-manager, spending £3,000 on buying him a house in the town. Shortly after his dismissal in 1962, the club withdrew from the Combination. The club's last recorded match was a 10–0 defeat at Altrincham in the first qualifying round of the 1963–64 FA Cup, Taberner scoring a double hat-trick and Wilson in goal being credited with keeping the score down to a mere ten. Mannion sued the club committee for breach of contract and in 1965 settled for £75 plus £50 costs.

== Colours ==
The club played in tangerine shirts and white shorts.

== Ground ==
The club played at Vista Park.
