= Bolton Crook Street railway station =

Disused railway station in Bolton, Greater Manchester

Bolton, Crook Street

General information
- Location: Bolton, Greater Manchester, Bolton; England
- Coordinates: 53.5734°N 2.4312°W
- Grid reference: SD716088

Other information
- Status: Disused

History
- Original company: Bolton and Leigh Railway
- Pre-grouping: London and North Western Railway
- Post-grouping: London, Midland and Scottish Railway

Key dates
- 1 August 1871: Opened as temporary terminus
- 28 September 1874: Closed to passengers
- 1 October 1967: Closed for freight
Location

Bolton Crook Street passenger station was a purely temporary facility within the Bolton Crook Street goods yard, devised by the LNWR for use while their nearby Great Moor Street station was demolished and rebuilt. It was used as such from August 1871 to September 1874, after which it reverted to use solely for goods.

The temporary passenger station's exact location within the goods yard is believed to be the goods shed on the eastern side of Chandos Street.

Sources differ on whether Great Moor St station reopened in September 1874 or April 1875. The original service to Kenyon Junction was provided continuously from 1831 to 1954. Still, the new, additional service to Manchester Exchange via Roe Green Junction and Walkden Low Level by the London and North Western Railway did not start until 1 April 1875, when it ran from Great Moor Street. It is therefore possible that Crook Street handed the Kenyon Junction traffic to the new Great Moor Street station in 1874.

== Accidents ==
On 29 October 1875, an accident occurred at Roe Green Junction but the official register of accidents gives no actual details

On 16 March 1918 a goods train from Little Hulton "ran away" on the falling gradients towards Bolton. An alert signalman diverted it into Crook Street depot where it crashed through buffer stops, crossed cobbled land, crashed through a boundary wall and into the cellar of a house on Crook Street. The crew had jumped clear and nobody was injured.

== Closure ==
After a long period of decline the Crook Street goods depot was finally closed to all traffic on 1 October 1967.

The site has been redeveloped in the years since and by 2015 no trace of its railway origins could be seen.

Preceding station	Disused railways	Following station
Terminus	London and North Western Railway; Bolton and Leigh Railway	Daubhill; Line and station closed
