= Earlestown railway station =

Railway station in Merseyside, England

Earlestown
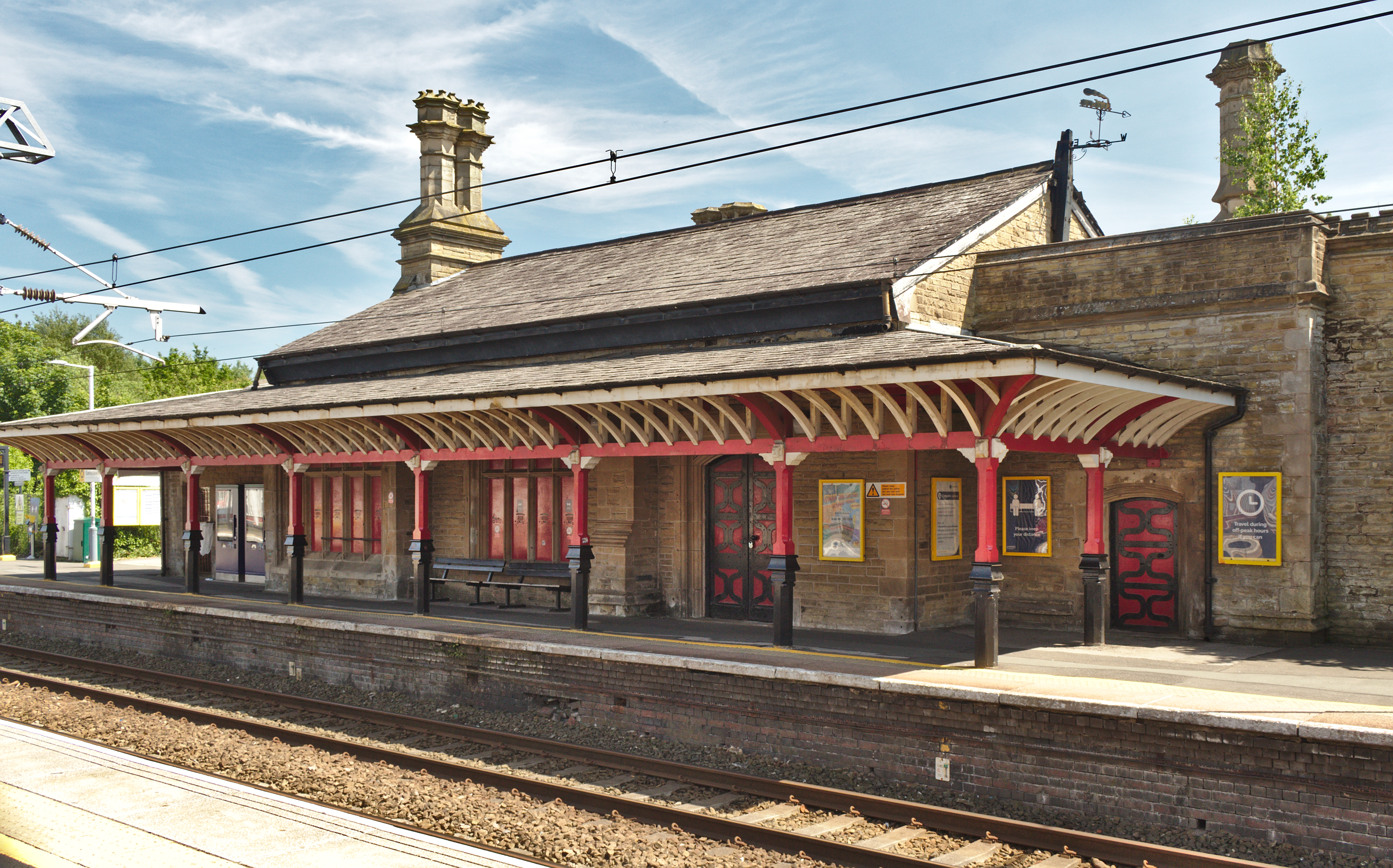
- Platform at historic Earlestown station

General information
- Location: Earlestown, Newton-le-Willows, St Helens; England
- Coordinates: 53°27′04″N 2°38′17″W
- Grid reference: SJ578951
- Managed by: Northern Trains
- Transit authority: Merseytravel
- Platforms: 5

Other information
- Station code: ERL
- Fare zone: A1
- Classification: DfT category E

History
- Original company: Liverpool and Manchester Railway
- Pre-grouping: London and North Western Railway
- Post-grouping: London, Midland and Scottish Railway

Key dates
- 17 September 1830: Opened as Viaduct
- October 1832: Renamed Warrington Junction
- c. 1839: Renamed Newton Junction
- 1852: Renamed Warrington Junction
- 1861: Renamed Earlestown Junction
- 5 June 1950: Renamed Earlestown

Passengers
- 2020/21: ▼68,338
- Interchange: ▼4,593
- 2021/22: ▲0.231 million
- Interchange: ▲12,893
- 2022/23: ▲0.275 million
- Interchange: ▲51,348
- 2023/24: ▲0.302 million
- Interchange: ▼29,277
- 2024/25: ▲0.331 million
- Interchange: ▲43,987

Listed Building – Grade II
- Official name: Earlestown railway station
- Designated: 3 February 1966
- Reference no.: 1343264
Location
Notes
- Passenger statistics from the Office of Rail and Road

Earlestown railway station is a railway station in Earlestown, Merseyside, England, in the Merseytravel region. The station is branded Merseyrail. It was an original station on the Liverpool and Manchester Railway opening in 1830. It became a junction station when the Warrington and Newton Railway opened in 1831. It is one of the few "triangular" stations in Britain.

== History ==
=== Opening ===
The Liverpool and Manchester Railway (L&MR) opened its line through the site on 17 September 1830.

In the early days of railway operations intermediate stations were often little more than halts, usually positioned where the railway was crossed by a road or turnpike, in this case the station was at the first place eastbound after crossing Sankey Viaduct, where the line crossed a road, Wargrave Lane (now Wargrave Road).

The station, or more correctly stopping place, was one of sixteen listed by the L&MR on 1 January 1831, at the time it was known as Viaduct. Making it one of the oldest passenger railway stations in the world.

=== Early connections ===
The station became a junction in 1831 when the Warrington and Newton Railway (W&NR) reached the L&MR. The W&NR opened the first section of its line in June 1831 to the 'south end of Newton' to cater for traffic between Warrington and the races at Newton Race Course. (Note: The race course was to the north of the Liverpool and Manchester Railway so getting there would have required a walk from the temporary drop-off point to the race course.) (Note: Newton Race Course closed in 1898 being succeeded by Haydock Park Racecourse which opened in 1899.) Shortly afterwards, on 25 July 1831, a connection was made between the W&NR and the L&MR when the W&NR extended its line northwards and a west curve, that is towards Liverpool, was installed. The L&MR did not initially allow the W&NR to run their passenger trains on its line but did agree to attach W&NR coaches to its own trains at Newton Junction for onward delivery to Manchester or Liverpool. This arrangement changed in 1832 when the L&MR decided that their own coaches would be used and passengers would have to change trains at Newton Junction.

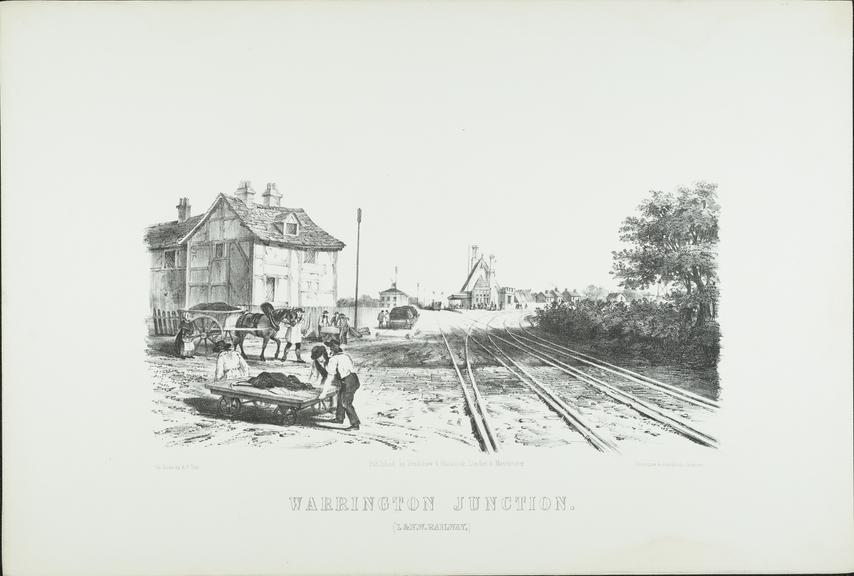
Warrington Junction Station from Views on the London & North Western Railway - Northern Division 1848

The space in and around the station became more congested when the Haydock colliery line connected to the L&MR towards Manchester in December 1831 and then crossed the L&MR via an at-grade almost right-angled crossing to join the W&NR towards Warrington in 1832. The L&MR objected to this at-grade crossing they were unable to do much about it due to an existing right-of-way for a tramway. This line then bifurcated with the main route continuing to join the W&NR line south of the station, the branch turned eastwards into a dead-end from which a further line crossed south of the station, crossing the west curve, again at-grade, to the Sankey Canal at Bradlegh Wharf. There was a spur into Muspratt's vitriol works which closed in 1873. (Note: There are two photographs of this arrangement available online in Meccano Magazine.)

A further connection towards Manchester was made when the W&NR east curve opened on 4 July 1837, creating another at-grade crossing with the Haydock colliery line.

The two curves had a very tight radii causing problems leading to breakages of crank axles on GJR early locomotives leading in turn to the introduction of Crewe type locomotives with outside cylinders. Trains travelling on the curves were restricted to a slow maximum speed, needing careful handling as the drivers needed to use a lot of power in the northwards direction, because of the gradient of 1 in 85 for the 1 mile (1.6 km) up to the junctions, and then ease off under control into the station. (Note: Reed (1969) notes the east curve was the tightest at 660 feet (200 m) radius, the GJR had to resort to using older locomotives as an interim measure.)

The use of the east curve reduced considerably when the Manchester and Birmingham Railway opened from Manchester Store Street to Crewe on 10 August 1842. The east curve continued to be used by Manchester to Chester trains and those from the south heading further north than the Liverpool to Manchester line via the North Union Railway.

The L&NWR direct line from Winwick, just north of Warrington, to Golbourne, north of the former L&MR (the Winwick cut-off) on the former Wigan Branch Railway line opened on 1 August 1864 cutting the station out of the route of most of the long-distance north–south traffic.

Passenger services from the south to Liverpool reduced dramatically in 1869 when the Runcorn Railway Bridge was opened by the L&NWR, although the Newton route was still used by some freight trains.

=== Names and governance ===
The station has had a variety of names, when the L&MR opened the line in 1830 the stopping place was called Viaduct. The following year, when the connection between the W&NR and the L&MR was made it was renamed to Warrington Junction.

On 1 January 1835 the W&NR was acquired by the Grand Junction Railway (GJR) which opened the remainder of its line to Birmingham in July 1837, thus providing through services between Birmingham, Liverpool and Manchester.

When the first Bradshaw's Guide was published in 1839 the station was called Newton Junction, (Note: The station is located in the township of Newton-le-Willows.) contemporary Ordnance Survey mapping also shows the station as Newton Junction. Although it was sometimes known by both names simultaneously, the L&MR calling it Warrington Junction and the W&NR/GJR calling it Newton Junction.

On 8 August 1845 the L&MR and the GJR amalgamated under the GJR name and on 16 July 1846 the GJR amalgamated with others to become the London and North Western Railway (L&NWR) whose mainline extended south to London Euston and north to Preston with connections to Carlisle.

In 1852 Bradshaw's guide was showing the station had been renamed to Warrington Junction.

In 1853 the L&NWR leased the Viaduct Foundry from Jones & Potts who had ceased trading in 1852, subsequently purchasing the site outright in 1860, it became the Earlestown wagon works. (Note: The works were originally the Earlestown carriage and wagon works but carriage manufacturing was transferred to Saltney in 1860 and wagon manufacturing and repair work was centralised at Earlestown.) The foundry was adjacent to the railway on its north side between the station and the Sankey Canal In 1855 the works and the new town that sprang up next to it was named Earlestown in honour of the L&NWR's senior director Hardman Earle who had been instrumental in setting up the works. (Note: The works eventually grew to 36 acres and employed 2,000, the railway company itself built 340 houses.)

In 1861 the station was renamed Earlestown Junction. The suffix junction was officially dropped on 5 June 1950 though Earlestown had been used earlier than this on London, Midland and Scottish Railway (LMS) tickets.

=== Layout and structures ===
After the curves were built the station had an unusual triangular configuration with six platforms, one each side of the former L&MR Liverpool to Manchester main line (platform 1 towards Manchester and platform 2 towards Liverpool) and one each side of the former W&NR lines in the east (platform 5 towards Manchester and platform 6 towards Warrington) and west curves (platform 3 towards Warrington and platform 4 towards Liverpool).

Platform 1, the L&MR platform for Manchester, was directly accessible from the adjacent road (originally Pepper Alley Lane, by 1893 Railway Street had been built), by 1893 the other platforms were accessed by a long footbridge stretching from platform 1 to platform 4 with steps in the centre down to platforms 2 and 3. The east curve platforms were some distance from the rest of the station, a footpath led from the eastern end of platform 2, crossing the Haydock colliery railway to the Manchester bound platform, a further footbridge was needed to reach the Warrington platform. In 1903 an additional footbridge was provided from platform 1 to platform 2 and a covered walkway provided to platform 5, the walkway was still in existence in 1973 but had gone by 1975.

A station building was located in the angle of the Liverpool to Manchester main line and the west curve (at the western end of platforms 2 and 3), it was probably built c.1835–1840. (Note: The Oxford Gazetteer of Britain's historic railway buildings dates it thus, it is shown on the 1849 OS mapping which was surveyed in 1846–1847) The building is described by Biddle (2003):

A little Tudor building of amazing elaboration and charm was erected in a creamy-golden stone. Windows are mullioned, including a large rectangular bay at the west end adorned with carved decoration and mini-crenellations. On the south side a window angled to the curve is surmounted by three giant saw-tooth crenellations and blank shields on a frieze, accompanied by three different octagonal chimney stacks. The north side has a low-pitched hipped and slated veranda on wooden posts.

The building's roof was replaced with one of a shallower pitch in 1903, Biddle (2003) reported it as having collapsed recently with only a temporary replacement. A full history of the building is unavailable, in 1947 it was a waiting room. prior to this it was at some time the booking office. It was listed at grade 2 in 1966. The building was refurbished in 1980 to hold an exhibition celebrating 150 years of British railways. Opposite the Tudor building on platform 1 there was a waiting shelter with a cantilevered roof.

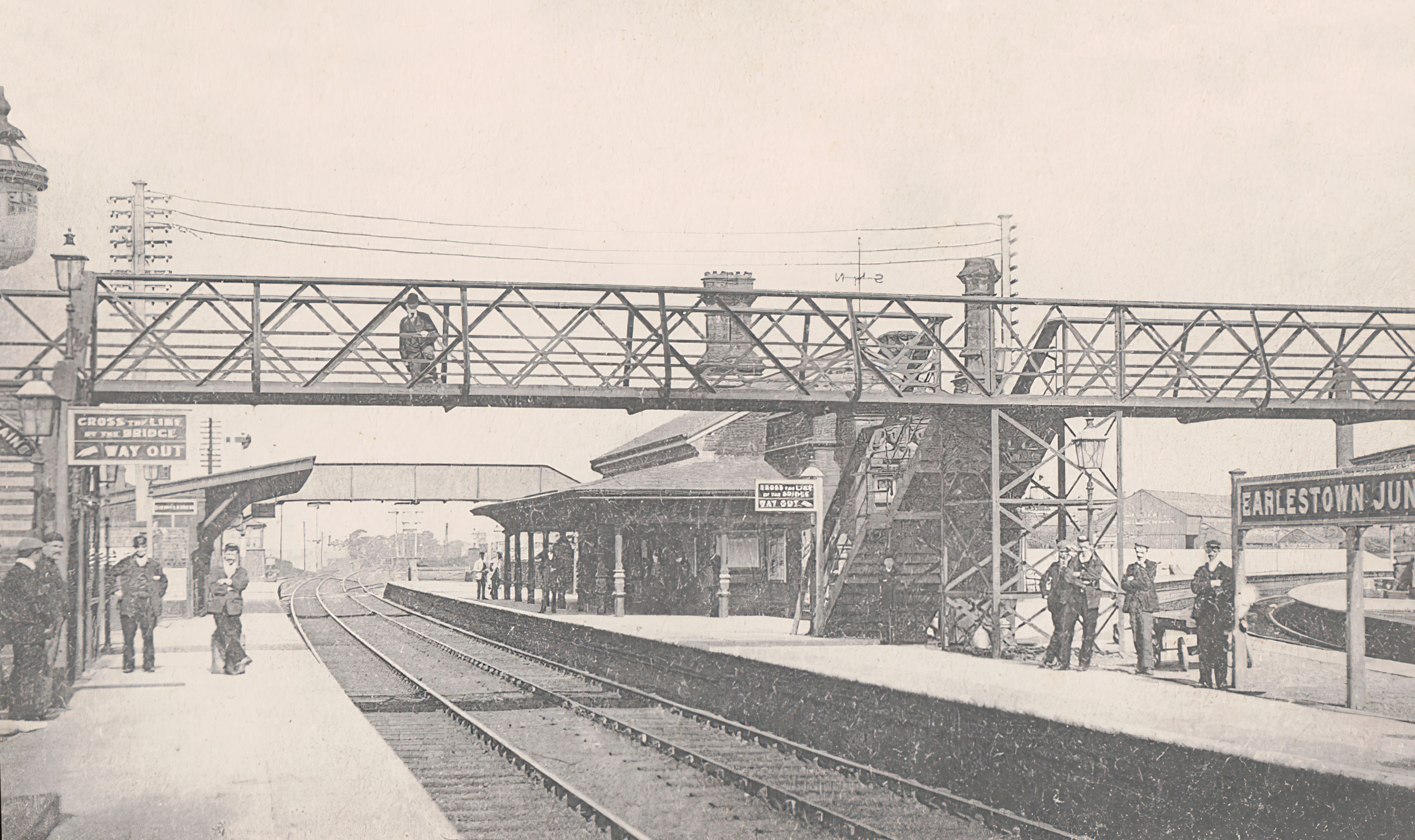
Earlestown Junction postcard from c.1900 showing the long footbridge to platforms 2,3 & 4, the Tudor building with veranda on platforms 2 & 3, and a waiting shelter on platform 1 with a cantilevered roof

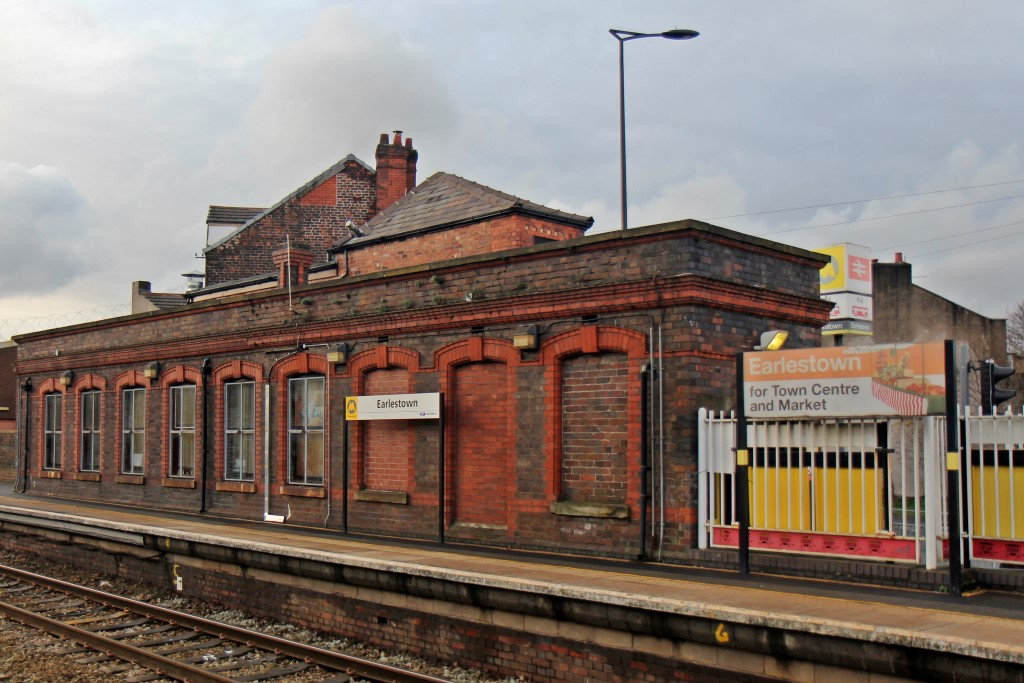
The 1880 L&NWR booking office, still in use

Until 1880 the booking office was in the end terraced house on Railway Place. In c.1880 the L&NWR built a long, narrow ticket office in blue brick and red terracotta on platform 1.

The station was rebuilt in 1902 when buildings were provided on platforms 5 and 6 these buildings were demolished in 1972–1973 to provide room for masts to support overhead wire electrification.

The platforms on the west curve (platforms 3 and 4) closed some time between 1973 and 1975 as the curve was reduced to a single bi-directional track. A single platform was brought back into use by 2009, this may have happened in 1994 as Merseyrail planned for the platform to re-open then.

The platforms were re-numbered, platforms 1 and 2 remained the same, platform 3 became bi-directional and the east curve platforms became platform 4 towards Manchester and platform 5 towards Warrington.

=== Early operations ===
The safe working of the station and its junctions created additional problems for the railway, over and above the novelty of operating a new railway. There had been nothing like this before and rules had to be created to keep things as safe as possible. Initially any special conditions were advised through the published timetable and on large placard notices. The station had four policemen (signallers who controlled trains with flags or hand signals) constantly on duty. Newton Junction was the first station in Britain to have fixed signals installed, these were chequered boards on posts that could be turned through 90° to indicate another train was just ahead, several lamps were used at night.

Initially the station had only to deal with L&MR second class trains, that is trains stopping trains at all the stopping places on the mainline. There were two of these trains in each direction, shortly increased to three. (Note: The L&MR had first and second class coaches but they ran them as first and second class trains, first class trains were composed of only first class coaches, were faster because they had fewer stops, whereas second class trains stopped wherever required, initially they had only second class coaches but later also had first class for the convenience of first class passengers who wished to use intermediate stations.)

By 1836 the service pattern had evolved to five daily second class trains each way, with an additional two per day during the summer months. In 1837 the GJR opened as far as Birmingham, they operated their trains in a similar manner as the L&MR with first class and mixed trains carrying both classes, their trains ran through the station to both Liverpool and Manchester, initially there were four first class trains per day and two mixed class.

Roscoe (1839) describes the operation of the GJR trains at Warrington:

The carriages for Liverpool and Manchester, which have come from Birmingham in one train, are here separated; and, while the Firefly continues to rush forward with those destined for Liverpool, the Comet, or some other locomotive of equally ominous name, flies off with the Manchester carriages in quick succession... The plan is this: the separate trains from Liverpool and Manchester arrive at Warrington a few minutes before the train from Birmingham; the locomotive which has come from Liverpool takes the united trains forward to Birmingham, while the engine which has brought its train from Manchester returns back again with the carriages which have arrived from Birmingham.

The crossing of all three sides of the triangle of lines by the Haydock colliery lines caused difficulties but it was especially difficult at the crossing of the L&MR main-line as this junction was at the bottom of an incline on the colliery line. In July 1838 a tall flagpole was erected and a policeman hoisted a distinctive coloured flag when a coal train was crossing the mainline. The flag eventually became a semaphore signal which remained in use until the colliery line closed in the mid 1960s.

A whole section of the rule book was devoted to trying to regulate the various lines through the junction, it was the busiest and most complicated point on the line.

=== Historic passenger services ===
By 1895 services through the station were:

- Liverpool to Manchester line services on the main line, these services are still running.
- Manchester to Chester line services, these services are still running.
- Selected services using the West Coast Main Line including some services between Birmingham and Glasgow, the newspaper train between London and Aberdeen and services from Crewe to stations north of Wigan. These services have been discontinued.
- There was a service between Warrington Bank Quay and Wigan North Western. This service has been withdrawn.

Other historic services included:

- There was a Manchester to Warrington service in 1947 that has since been withdrawn.
- Until 1954 there was a service between Warrington Bank Quay and Bolton Great Moor Street via Kenyon Junction and Atherton Bag Lane.
- A Push-pull service ran between Warrington Bank Quay and St Helens Shaw Street until 1964 when it was withdrawn as a result of the Beeching report.

=== Freight ===
Between 1893 and 1907 a goods shed with a yard was built to the south of the main line on the western side of the station. Rail access was from the western end, road access from the east. The goods yard was able to accommodate most types of goods including live stock and was equipped with a five ton crane.

=== Accidents ===
- On 17 November 1833 a L&MR train was stopped by the west curve to effect repairs when a W&NR train crashed into it, the W&NR train carriages were being propelled by the locomotive with no-one on the lookout.
- In January 1836 a L&MR train ran into an empty Haydock colliery line train which was crossing the main-line with one fatality.
- On 22 June 1836 a passenger alighted from the wrong side of a Manchester bound train into the path of the Liverpool bound one which fatally ran her over.
- On 22 December 1841 a pedestrian crossing the line was fatally run over.
- On a foggy morning in February 1844 a pedestrian crossing the line was run down and killed.
- At midnight on 25 March 1845 a Bolton and Leigh Railway (B&LR) train heading towards Liverpool on the L&MR main-line collided with the rear of a GJR luggage train that was crossing from the northern L&MR main-line onto the west curve, it had not cleared the junction when the B&LR train collided with it. (Note: Luggage trains was the early term for freight, in the same vein passenger trains were initially called coach trains.)
- On 19 December 1873 a London to Liverpool train collided with a portion of a train of coal wagons from the Haydock colliery line which were standing across the line.
- On 23 December 1873 an express train from Liverpool to Leeds came into collision with a Chester to Manchester train that had overrun the signal at the end of the east curve resulting in 8 passengers being injured.
- On 12 September 1882 a coal train collided with a standing passenger train on the east-to-south curve due to a signalman error.
- In the early 1960s a coal train on the Haydock colliery line ran out of control heading towards Earlestown and crashed through the crossing gates.
- On 29 December 1959 the trap points on the Haydock colliery line derailed a 40 wagon coal train unable to stop before crossing the mainline.

=== Beeching ===
In the Beeching Report of 1963, Earlestown was listed as one of the stations to be closed, but it remained open along with other stations between Liverpool and Manchester that had also been listed such as Huyton and Edge Hill.

=== Electrification ===
The original south to north west coast route, using the east curve, was electrified at 25 kV 50 Hz AC at the same time as the shorter route using the Winwick cut-off at the end of July 1973.

The remaining parts of the station were electrified as part of the North West electrification, which was announced in July 2009. This project saw the original West Coast Main Line electrification joined to the Manchester to Liverpool electrification at the east and south sides of Earlestown station. This electrification work was completed in February 2015.

== Current situation ==
In 2025 the ticket office is staffed for the duration of service here each day (06:00 to midnight weekdays and Saturdays, 08:30 to midnight Sundays) and there are ticket machines on platforms 1 and 2. Digital information screens, timetable poster boards and automatic announcements provide train running information. All platforms have either shelters or canopies.

There two entrances to the station, past the booking office on Railway Street directly on to platform 1, or via a footpath from Old Wargrave Road onto platform 5. Only platforms 1 and 5 have step-free access, as the others are reached via the stepped footbridge between platforms 1 and 2 or via the stepped footbridge between platforms 5 and 4.

=== Platform layout and services ===
Services indicated are the normal Monday to Saturday services for the summer of 2025.

- Platform 1:
  - for services from Liverpool Lime Street to Manchester Airport, via Newton-le-Willows and Manchester Piccadilly operated by Northern Trains, one service per hour.
  - for services from Liverpool Lime Street to Manchester Victoria via Newton-le-Willows, operated by Northern Trains, three trains per day.
  - for services from Liverpool Lime Street to Wigan North Western via Newton-le-Willows, operated by Northern Trains, two trains per day.
- Platform 2:
  - for services to Liverpool Lime Street, via St Helens Junction from Manchester Airport, one train per hour, and Manchester Victoria, three trains per day operated by Northern Trains.
- Platform 3:
  - there is only one train per day from this platform, this is an evening service to Liverpool Lime Street from Ellesmere Port, operated by Northern Trains.
- Platform 4:
  - for services to Manchester Airport via Newton-le-Willows and Manchester Piccadilly, from Chester and North Wales, operated by Transport for Wales, one train per hour.
  - for services to Leeds via Newton-le-Willows and Manchester Victoria from Chester, one train per hour operated by Northern Trains.
- Platform 5:
  - for services to Chester and North Wales, via Warrington Bank Quay from Manchester Airport operated by Transport for Wales, one train per hour.
  - for services to Chester from Leeds and Manchester Victoria operated by Northern Trains, one train per hour.

== Planned projects ==
The station is due to have new lifts and footbridges installed in a refurbishment due to start in 2026, the plan also includes a reopened ticket office and café. Even the station's ‘triangle area’ is being transformed into community parkland.

Preceding station	National Rail	Following station
Warrington Bank Quay	Transport for Wales; North Wales and Chester to Manchester Airport	Newton-le-Willows
Warrington Bank Quay	Northern Trains; Chester–Leeds	Newton-le-Willows
St Helens Junction	Northern Trains; Liverpool to Manchester Line	Newton-le-Willows
St Helens Junction	Northern Trains; Liverpool to Wigan North Western service	Wigan North Western
	Historical railways	
Collins Green	Liverpool and Manchester Railway; Grand Junction Railway; London and North Western Railway	Newton Bridge
Terminus	Warrington and Newton Railway; Grand Junction Railway; London and North Western Railway	Warrington Dallam Lane
Collins Green	Grand Junction Railway; London and North Western Railway	Warrington Bank Quay
Newton Bridge	Grand Junction Railway; London and North Western Railway	Warrington Bank Quay

== See also ==
- Listed buildings in St Helens, Merseyside

== Bibliography ==
- Awdry, Christopher (1990). Encyclopaedia of British Railway Companies. Sparkford: Patrick Stephens Ltd. ISBN 1-8526-0049-7. OCLC 19514063. CN 8983.
- Beeching, Richard (1963). "The Reshaping of British Railways" (PDF). HMSO.
- Biddle, Gordon (2003). Britain's Historic Railway Buildings: An Oxford Gazetteer of Structures and Sites. Oxford: Oxford University Press. ISBN 9780198662471.
- Bradshaw, George (1843). Bradshaw's Railway Companion, containing the times of departure, fares, &c. of the railways in Great Britain and Ireland. London: Bradshaw's Railway Information Office.
- Bradshaw, George (2011) [December 1895]. Bradshaw's Rail Times for Great Britain and Ireland December 1895: A Reprint of the Classic Timetable Complete with Period Advertisements and Shipping Connections to All Parts. Midhurst: Middleton Press. ISBN 978-1-908174-11-6. OCLC 832579861.
- Bridge, Mike, ed. (2009). TRACKatlas of Mainland Britain. Bradford on Avon: Trackmaps. ISBN 978-0-9549866-5-0.
- Christiansen, Rex (1995). Regional Rail Centres: North West. Specialist Marketing International. ISBN 0-7110-2348-4.
- Dawson, Anthony (2020). The Liverpool and Manchester Railway : an operating history. Barnsley, South Yorkshire: Pen & Sword Transport. ISBN 978-1-4738-9913-1. OCLC 1204607582.
- Donaghy, Thomas J. (1972). Liverpool & Manchester Railway operations, 1831-1845. Newton Abbot, Devon: David and Charles. ISBN 0-7153-5705-0.
- Ferneyhough, Frank (1980). Liverpool & Manchester Railway, 1830-1980. R. Hale. ISBN 978-0-7091-8137-8.
- Grant, Donald J. (2017). Directory of the Railway Companies of Great Britain (1st ed.). Kibworth Beauchamp, Leicestershire: Troubador Publishing Ltd. ISBN 978-1-78803-768-6.
- Hartless, Adrian (2017). Crewe to Wigan : including Over & Wharton. Midhurst, West Sussex: Middleton Press. ISBN 9781910356128. OCLC 1391400402.
- Holt, Geoffrey O.; Biddle, Gordon (1986). The North West. A Regional history of the railways of Great Britain. Vol. 10 (2nd ed.). David St. John Thomas. ISBN 978-0-946537-34-1. OCLC 643506870.
- Larkin, Edgar J.; Larkin, John G. (1988). The Railway Workshops of Britain, 1823-1986. Basingstoke: Macmillan. ISBN 978-1-349-08074-8. OCLC 1053798352.
- Latham, J.B. (1980). Haydock Collieries: Their locomotives and railways. Industrial Locomotive Society.
- LMS Railway (1939). London Midland & Scottish Passenger Railway Timetable- July 3rd to September 24th, inclusive, 1939. London: LMS.
- Lowe, James Wensley (1975). British steam locomotive builders. Leicestershire: TEE Publishers. ISBN 0-905100-57-3. OCLC 39757689.
- Nock, Oswald Stevens (1974). Electric Euston to Glasgow. Shepperton: Ian Allan. ISBN 0-7110-0530-3.
- Pixton, Bob (1996). Warrington Railways. The Archive Photographs. Stroud: Chalford. ISBN 0-7524-0750-3.
- Pixton, Bob (2006). Liverpool and Manchester: LNWR Lines. Midland Publishing Limited. ISBN 978-0-9544859-9-3.
- Quick, Michael (2023) [2001]. Railway passenger stations in Great Britain: a chronology (PDF). version 5.05. Railway & Canal Historical Society.
- Reed, Brian (1969). Crewe to Carlisle. Shepperton, Surrey: Ian Allan. SBN 7110-0057-3.
- Reed, Malcolm C. (1996). The London & North Western Railway: A History. Atlantic Transport. ISBN 978-0-906899-66-3.
- Roscoe, Thomas (1839). The Book of the Grand Junction Railway:Being a History and Description of the Line from Birmingham to Liverpool and Manchester.
- Simmons, Jack (1997). "Class distinctions". In Simmons, Jack; Biddle, Gordon (eds.). The Oxford Companion to British Railway History From 1603 to the 1990s (1st ed.). Oxford: Oxford University Press. pp. 84–87. ISBN 0-19-211697-5.
- Singleton, David (1975). Liverpool and Manchester Railway : a mile by mile guide to the world's first "modern" railway. Clapham, N. Yorkshire: Dalesman. OCLC 1310749385.
- The Railway Clearing House (1970) [1904]. The Railway Clearing House Handbook of Railway Stations 1904 (1970 D&C Reprint ed.). Newton Abbot: David & Charles Reprints. ISBN 0-7153-5120-6.
- Thomas, R. H. G. (1980). The Liverpool & Manchester Railway. London: Batsford. ISBN 0-7134-0537-6.
- Townley, C.H.A.; Peden, J.A. (2002). The industrial railways of St. Helens, Widnes and Warrington: Part 2, St. Helens coalfield and the sandfields : including Pilkington Brothers Ltd's sandfield operations. Industrial Railway Society. ISBN 9781901556254. OCLC 50099823.
- Webster, Norman W. (1972). Britain's First Trunk Line:The Grand Junction Railway. Adams & Dart. SBN 239 00105 2.
