= Plodder Lane engine shed =

Plodder Lane
- Interactive map of Plodder Lane

Location
- Location: Farnworth, Bolton, England
- Coordinates: 53.5516°N 2.4245°W
- OS grid: SD719061

Characteristics
- Owner: British Railways
- Depot code: 10D
- Type: Steam

History
- Opened: 1 April 1875
- Closed: 10 October 1954
- Original: London and North Western Railway
- Pre-grouping: LNWR
- Post-grouping: LMSR

Plodder Lane engine shed was built by the LNWR to coincide with expanding its operations in the Bolton area in the 1870s and in particular the opening of a direct route from Bolton Great Moor Street station to Manchester via Walkden in 1875.

== History ==
The shed was built on a 5.85 acres (2.37 hectares) plot north of Plodder Lane (now the B6199) and Plodder Lane station. The engine shed, 42 feet (13 m) turntable, coaling and watering facilities were on the western side of the line, with a goods shed and yard on the eastern side. The shed was built in Ramsbottom's hipped-roof style and could accommodate twelve locomotives.

In 1890 work started to enlarge the shed's facilities. A six road shed in the standard northlight style was built adjoining the original engine shed, more than doubling the covered storage capacity. The turntable was moved to accommodate it and its tracks and the coaling and watering plant were replaced by a larger version. Minor adjustments were made in later years, but the basic facilities put in place in the 1890s hardly changed until closure in 1954.

In the 1930s the roof and one wall of the original shed were demolished as life expired and not replaced. The hand-operated 42-foot turntable was replaced by a 60-foot vacuum-operated version in 1938. During World War II an air raid shelter was dug and a distinctive aircraft spotter's hut was erected on top of the water tank.

Passenger services were reduced during the Second World War and thereafter. The Great Moor St to Manchester service took more than twice as long as the service from Bolton Trinity Street and intermediate traffic was slight, some with rail alternatives available such as at Walkden. The route to Kenyon Junction served small communities which either had other rail routes nearby or had more frequent and convenient buses. Bolton Great Moor St closed to regular passenger services in March 1954. Freight traffic was undergoing gradual decline and combined with the end of passenger workings left Plodder Lane shed with no role which could not be filled by other sheds such as Patricroft. Plodder Lane shed closed in October 1954.

The shed buildings and Plodder Lane station were demolished although the shed's water tank - minus lookout post - survived until the 1960s. The goods facilities on the other side of the tracks remained open until 30 January 1965.

All former LNWR lines in the Bolton area north of Howe Bridge and Atherton were closed by 6 January 1969.

== See also ==
- List of British Railways shed codes
