= Manchester Exchange =

Manchester Exchange may refer to:

- Manchester Exchange railway station
- Manchester Exchange (UK Parliament constituency)
- Royal Exchange, Manchester
