= Collins Green railway station =

Former railway station in England

Collins Green

General information
- Location: Burtonwood, Warrington; England
- Coordinates: 53.4436°N 2.6628°W
- Grid reference: SJ560943
- Platforms: 2

Other information
- Status: Disused

History
- Original company: Liverpool and Manchester Railway
- Pre-grouping: London and North Western Railway
- Post-grouping: London, Midland and Scottish Railway

Key dates
- 15 September 1830: Station opened
- 2 April 1951: Station closed
Location

Collins Green railway station was a railway station in Burtonwood, Warrington, England. It was in operation between 1830 and 1951.

== Opening and location ==
The station was opened by the Liverpool & Manchester Railway (L&MR) on 15 September 1830. The station lay on the L&MR's line between St Helens Junction and Earlestown stations.

It was situated in the hamlet of Collins Green, Lancashire (now in Cheshire), one mile (1.6 km) north of Burtonwood village. The station was located just east of the point where the railway line passed over Penkford Lane (B5204). The station was initially a request stop manned by a railway policeman in charge of the level-crossing. His quarters were in a building north of the line as shown on contemporary tithemaps.

Subsequently a short access road linked to a new station building on the south side of the line and the level-crossing was replaced by a tunnel.

== Later history and operating companies ==
The L&MR was absorbed by the Grand Junction Railway on 8 August 1845 and this company became a major component of the London & North Western Railway (L&NWR) on 16 July 1846. On 1 January 1923, the L&NWR was absorbed by the London Midland and Scottish Railway, which continued to operate the train services through the station.

== Passenger train service ==
During July 1922, most eastbound L&NWR trains stopping at the station on weekdays were local services from St Helens Shaw Street station to Earlestown or Warrington Bank Quay station, but three were through trains from Liverpool Lime Street to Manchester Exchange. Three years after the L&MSR was nationalised within British Railways, Collins Green station was closed on 2 April 1951.

Preceding station	Historical railways	Following station
St Helens Junction; Line and station open	London and North Western Railway; Liverpool and Manchester Railway	Earlestown; Line and station open
