= Little Hulton railway station =

Former railway station in England

Little Hulton
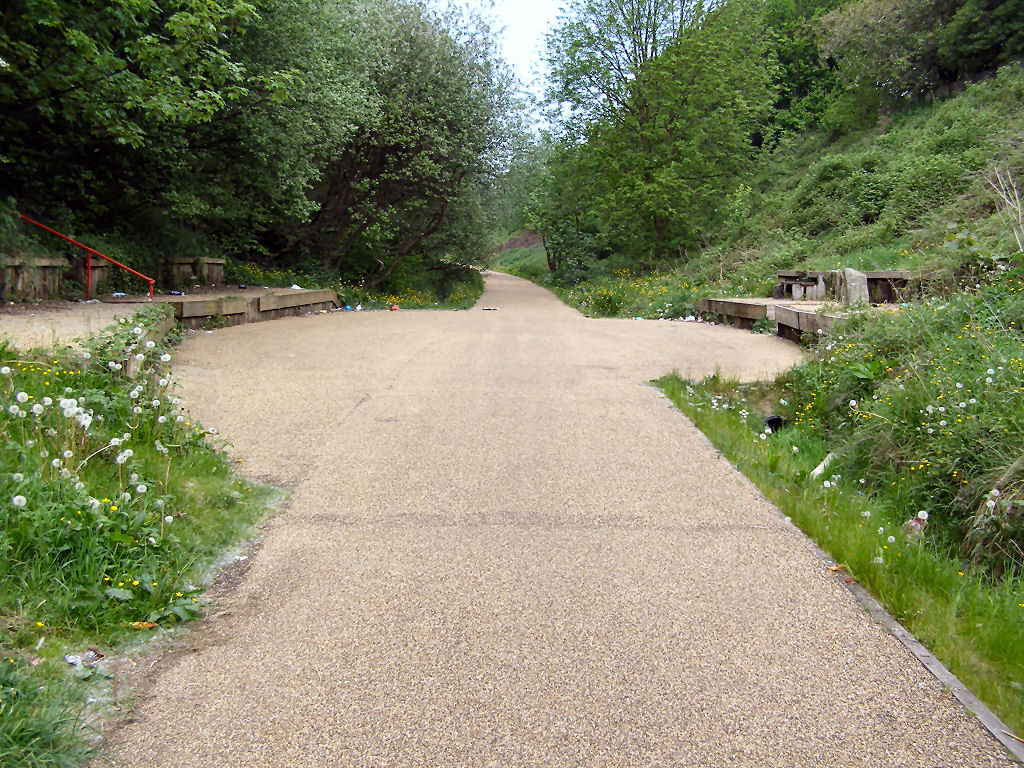
- The site of the station in 2010

General information
- Location: Little Hulton, Salford; England
- Coordinates: 53.5285°N 2.4163°W
- Grid reference: SD725036
- Platforms: 2

Other information
- Status: Disused

History
- Original company: London and North Western Railway
- Pre-grouping: London and North Western Railway
- Post-grouping: London Midland and Scottish Railway

Key dates
- 1 April 1875: Station opened
- 29 March 1954: Station closed
Location

Little Hulton railway station served the village of Little Hulton, Greater Manchester, England.

== History ==
The station was opened on 1 April 1875 by the London and North Western Railway (LNWR), on the line from Roe Green Junction to Bolton Great Moor Street. It was situated on the north side of the turnpiked Manchester to Chorley road at Little Hulton.

The LNWR proposed naming the station Streetgate but was overruled by the Little Hulton Local Board.

The line and station closed to regular passenger traffic in 1954, with the last train calling on Saturday 27 March.

By 2015 the trackbed through the station site formed part of National Cycle Network Route 55.

Preceding station	Disused railways	Following station
Plodder Lane; Line and station closed	LNWR	Walkden Low Level; Line and station closed
