= Plodder Lane railway station =

Former railway station in England

Plodder Lane

General information
- Location: Highfield, Farnworth, Bolton; England
- Coordinates: 53.5485°N 2.4233°W
- Grid reference: SD720058
- Platforms: 2

Other information
- Status: Disused

History
- Original company: London and North Western Railway
- Pre-grouping: London and North Western Railway
- Post-grouping: London, Midland and Scottish Railway

Key dates
- 1 April 1875: Station opened
- 29 March 1954: Station closed
Location

Plodder Lane railway station served the southern part of Bolton and the western, Highfield, part of Farnworth.

The station was located on the southern side of a bridge carrying Plodder Lane, the present B6199. The wooden station building was at road level with steps down to both platforms.

Plodder Lane station was on the London and North Western Railway route between Bolton Great Moor Street and Manchester Exchange.

== History ==
The station opened on 1 April 1875 and was sometimes known as Plodder Lane for Farnworth. There was a nearby locomotive shed, also named Plodder Lane. The station was the first one to the south of Bolton Great Moor Street, the line's northern terminus.

The station closed on 29 March 1954 and was demolished in the Winter of 1955–56.

The cutting that the station was in is still visible today and a footpath runs between the station site and Highfield Road. The site of the adjacent Engine Shed and Goods Yard was covered by housing although the path that led from Plodder Lane to Minerva Road survives and much of the exterior wall of the shed site is still in situ.

Preceding station	Disused railways	Following station
Bolton Great Moor Street; Line and station closed	London and North Western Railway	Little Hulton; Line and station closed
