= Warrington and Newton Railway =

Early British railway company

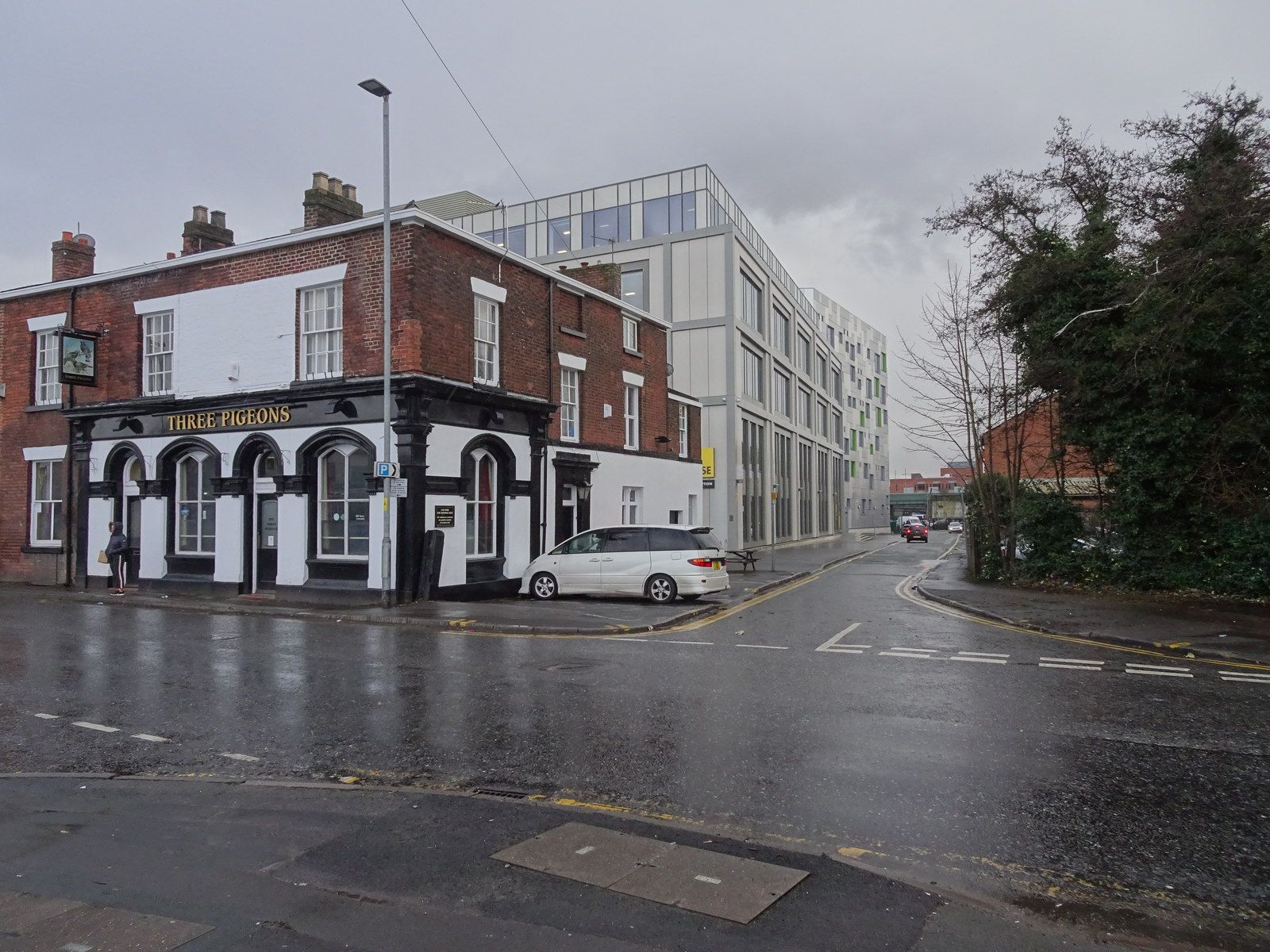
- Warrington Dallam Lane station site behind the three pigeons pub.

Overview
- Locale: Lancashire
- Dates of operation: June 1831–1 January 1835
- Successors: Grand Junction Railway; London and North Western Railway; London, Midland and Scottish Railway; London Midland Region of British Railways

Technical
- Track gauge: 4 ft 8 1/2 in (1,435 mm) standard gauge
- Length: 4 1/4 miles (6.8 km)
The W&NR in 1831
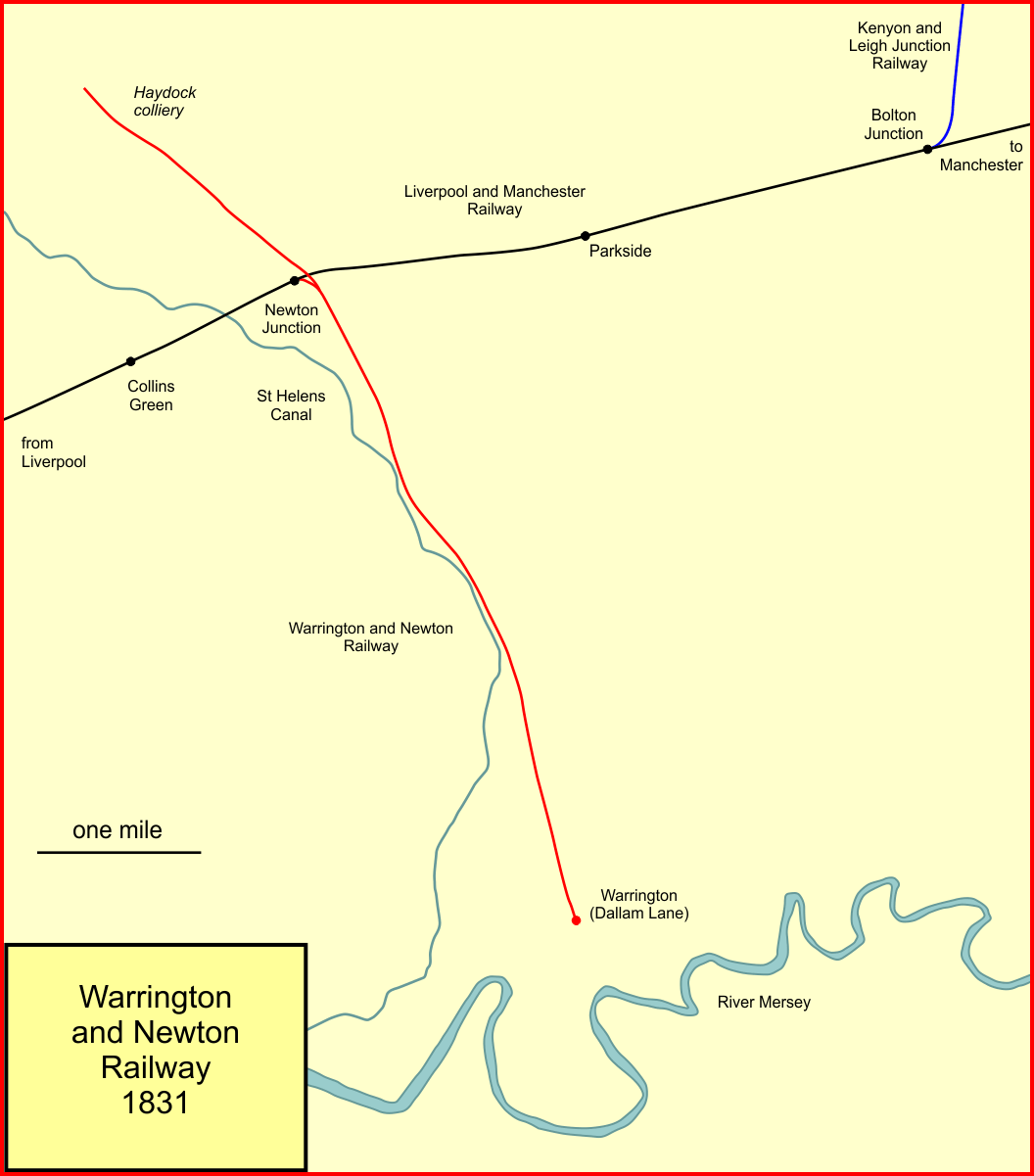

The Warrington and Newton Railway (W&NR) was a short early railway linking Warrington to the Liverpool and Manchester Railway (L&MR) at Newton, and to coal mining pits at Haydock, nearby. It opened in 1831.

In 1833 the Grand Junction Railway (GJR) was formed, it aspired to make a long-distance route from Birmingham to Liverpool and Manchester, and acquired the W&NR in 1835 so as to use it as part of its route from Warrington northwards.

The GJR opened its line in 1837, connecting to the former W&NR at Warrington Bank Quay.

== Background ==
The Liverpool and Manchester Railway (L&MR) was authorised under the Liverpool and Manchester Railway Act 1826 (7 Geo. 4. c. xlix) on 5 May 1826 and construction started soon after in June.

In 1828, while the L&MR was being built, a branch line to it from Warrington was proposed. Warrington was at the time a centre of manufacturing with a population approaching 20,000.

The line was surveyed by Robert Stephenson who was unable to lay the railway out in the way he would have wished instead having to resort to a more curvaceous route to appease local land owners.

The proposers of the railway included in the Act's preamble that it would be a:

work of great public utility and advantage by opening a safe , convenient and expeditious communication for the conveyance of goods, wares and other merchandize, between the town of Warrington and the towns of Liverpool, Manchester and other populous places, and also by affording a cheap and quick conveyance of coal from the pits in the neighbourhood of Newton to the town of Warrington where large quantities are consumed. (Note: An Act for making and maintaining a railway or tramroad from the Liverpool and Manchester Railway, at or near Wargrave Lane in Newton in Mackerfield to Warrington in the County Palatine of Lancaster, and Two Collateral Branches to communicate therewith.)

The proposed line ran from the L&MR at Wargrave Lane (now Wargrave Road) in Newton-in-Makerfield to a terminal at Dallum Lane in Warrington, a distance of 4 1/4 miles (6.8 km). (Note: Some sources give the lines length as 4 1/2 miles (7.2 km) or 4 3/4 miles (7.6 km).)

There was a branch proposed at Warrington from the intersection of Dallum Lane and Jockey Lane to terminate on the north side, and within 20 yards (18 m) of the Warrington to Liverpool turnpike, opposite Bankey or Bank Quay. (Note: Newton-le-Willows was historically known as Newton-in-Makerfield, the Act uses Newton-in-Mackerfield. Dallum was the contemporary spelling of Dallam and was used in that form in the Act. Both spellings were used for Bank Quay)

There was a second branch proposed, from the same junction but running southeastwards to Cockhedge Field, this branch was never built.

== Company formation ==
Two rival meetings were held in Warrington on 7 July 1828 each intending to promote a railway to link with the L&MR, fortunately the rivals came together and held a joint meeting on 4 August 1828 to propose forming a company and pursuing an act in parliament.

=== First act ===
The Warrington and Newton Railway was authorised by Parliament on 14 May 1829 in the Warrington and Newton Railway Act 1829 (10 Geo. 4. c. xxxvii).

On 4 June 1829 the first general meeting was held, adjourned until December 1829, when it resolved to "carry the Act into execution". Among the original shareholders were George Stephenson, Joseph Sandars, Joseph Locke, Benjamin Hick and Edward Pease.

The act had some limitations including the restrictions on the use of locomotives and it provided for a junction with the L&MR only towards Liverpool.

Warrington and Newton Railway Act 1829
- Act of Parliament
- Parliament of the United Kingdom
- Citation: 10 Geo. 4. c. xxxvii

Dates
- Royal assent: 14 May 1829

Other legislation
- Repealed by: Warrington and Newton Railway Act 1835

Status: Repealed

Text of statute as originally enacted

=== Second act ===
While the line was under construction in 1830, a second act, the Warrington and Newton Railway Act 1830 (11 Geo. 4 & 1 Will. 4. c. lvii), was obtained to construct a branch to also connect with the L&MR in the Manchester direction near to Parkside, it would also connect to the Wigan Branch Railway (WBR), the act also repealed some of the locomotive restrictions of the first act. (Note: An Act to enable the Company of Proprietors of the Warrington and Newton Railway to extend the Line of the said Railway, and for repealing, explaining, altering, amending and enlarging some of the Powers and Provisions of the Act relating thereto.) In fact both the W&NR and the WBR found themselves short of funds that they were unable to build the connecting lines.

Warrington and Newton Railway Act 1830
- Act of Parliament
- Parliament of the United Kingdom
- Long title: An Act to enable the Company of Proprietors of the Warrington and Newton Railway to extend the Line of the said Railway, and for repealing, explaining, altering, amending and enlarging some of the Powers and Provisions of the Act relating thereto.
- Citation: 11 Geo. 4 & 1 Will. 4. c. lvii

Dates
- Royal assent: 29 May 1830

Other legislation
- Repealed by: Warrington and Newton Railway Act 1835

Status: Repealed

Text of statute as originally enacted

=== Opening ===
In early June 1831 the Warrington and Newton Railway opened between Warrington (Dallam) and a location at Newton, somewhere to the south of the L&MR. The line opened without a northern terminus initially to service the Newton Common races, and passenger trains ran regularly after that. (Note: Reed (1969) quoting research by Mr E Craven rebuts the previous claims of the line opening on 25 July 1831.)

On 25 July 1831 the west curve at Newton Junction was opened and the connection to the L&MR was completed, there was one intermediate station at Winwick Quay. The opening was quiet, the directors travelled by special train to Newton where they met some of the L&MR directors, both parties travelling on to Warrington for refreshments.

The W&NR line at Newton Junction also connected to the Haydock colliery line which had a branch to Newton Race Course.

The branch to Bank Quay was not constructed immediately but probably opened in early 1835. The branch was used for goods and mineral traffic only, it terminated north of the Warrington to Liverpool turnpike. (Note: It was then Bank Quay Road, now the A5061 Liverpool Road.)

=== Operations ===
When the line opened the L&MR agreed to provide locomotives, carriages and waggons 'as far as they were able' but suggested that it would be expedient for the W&NR to acquire its own stock.

The L&MR did not initially allow the W&NR to run their passenger trains on its line but did agree to attach W&NR coaches to its own trains at Newton Junction for onward delivery to Manchester or Liverpool. This arrangement changed in 1832 when the L&MR decided that their own coaches would be used and passengers would have to change trains at Newton Junction.

The first locomotive, Warrington, a 2-2-0 Planet type built by Robert Stephenson and Company in Newcastle, arrived in May 1831.

The second and third locomotives were of the same type and came from the same company, they were named Newton and Vulcan (renamed Achilles at some time before September 1834), they were delivered on 1 September 1831 and 9 December 1831 respectively. There is a small possibility that these two locomotives were assembled at the Vulcan foundry from parts built at Newcastle. (Note: Baxter (1978) notes a fourth locomotive, Shrigley, also delivered in December 1831. Dawson (2020) attributes this locomotive as belonging to Thomas Legh the then part owner of Haydock Collieries.)

Service details were advertised in local newspapers by the railway's agent George Stubs. There were four trains each way Monday to Saturday only, trains left Warrington at 0700, 1000, 1400 and 1700, all carrying first and second class passengers with both Liverpool and Manchester as the destination. Return trains left at 0700, 0730 (second class only), 1000, 1400, 1700 and 1730 (second class only). Fares were 1/- second class and 1/6 first class each way between Warrington and Newton and 3/6 second class and 4/6 first class each way between Warrington and Liverpool or Manchester. (Note: United Kingdom pre-decimalisation currency, £sd, the fares were 1 shilling, 1 shilling and six pence, three shillings and six pence and four shillings and six pence.)

Sunday trains were run from late October 1831, there were two trains each Sunday timed to meet the trains from Liverpool and Manchester that left at 0700 from both places and at 1700 and 1800 one from Liverpool and the other from Manchester. (Note: The newspaper notice did not give the departure times from Warrington, nor was it clear which train was from Liverpool nor what time trains would be at Newton.)

The type of track adopted had cast iron fishbellied rails and untreated larch sleepers; the kyanising process for treating and preserving wood had not been fully developed by this time resulting in the early failure of the sleepers, many of which needed replacing by 1840.

== Grand Junction Railway acquisition ==
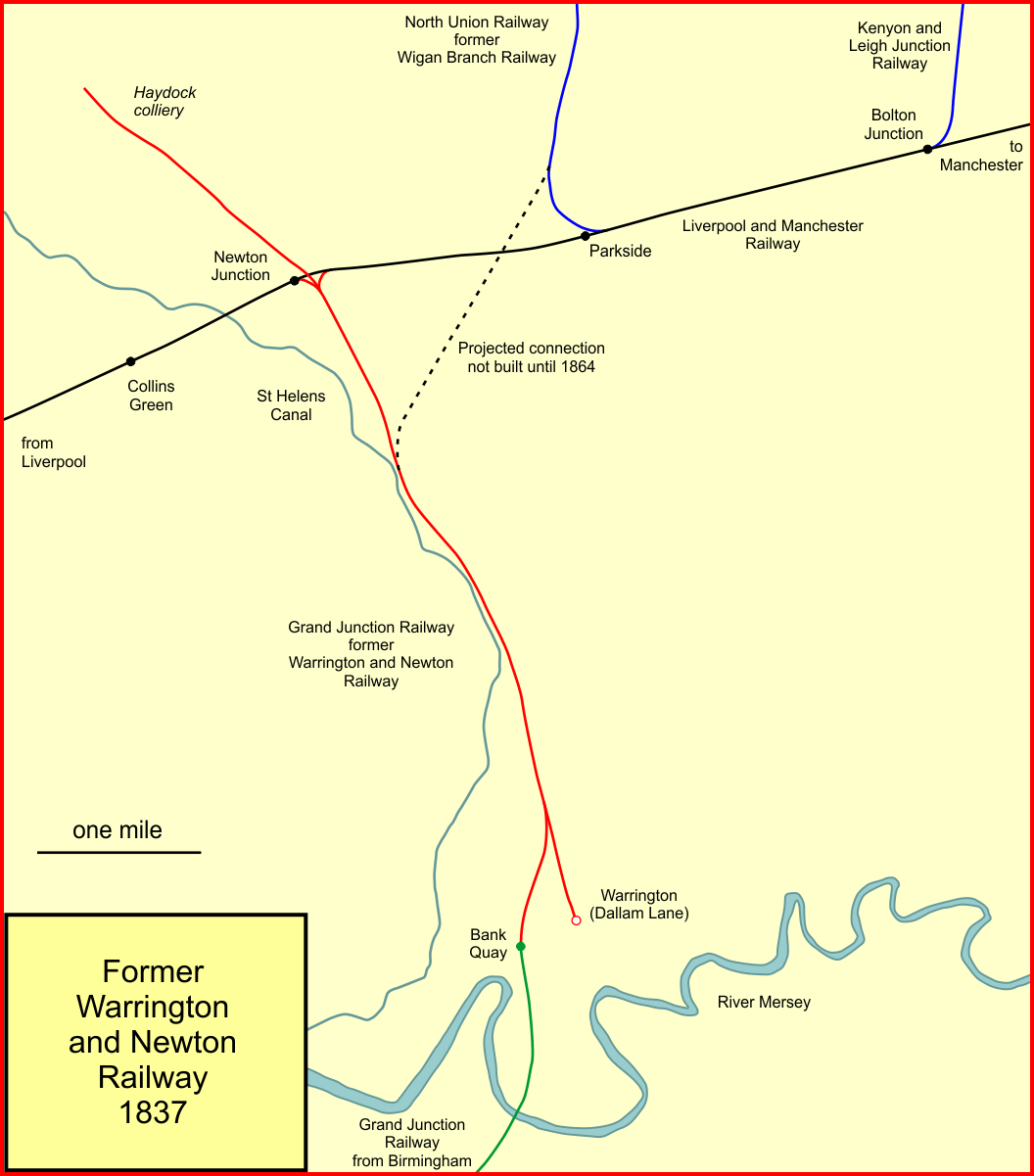
The Warrington and Newton line in 1837

=== Background ===
In 1832 and 1833 the promoters of the Grand Junction Railway (GJR) were considering their options. Their aim was to build a trunk railway connecting Birmingham with Liverpool and Manchester. If Liverpool was to be connected to the network further south, then the River Mersey would need to be crossed: the W&NR could serve as the northern extremity of their line if a crossing of the Mersey were made at Warrington.

The proposed GJR would link Birmingham with the central point of the Liverpool and Manchester Railway at Newton Junction, and Liverpool and Manchester would thereby be joined with Birmingham. This compromise lengthened the distances by rail but the greater convenience and economy was decisive, and the GJR authorising Act to set up the company and build the line from Warrington to Birmingham was secured on 6 May 1833. (Note: The act of Parliament was the Grand Junction Railway Act 1833 (3 & 4 Will. 4. c. xxxiv) (Note: An Act for making a Railway from the Warrington and Newton Railway at Warrington in the County of Lancaster to Birmingham in the County of Warwick, to be called the Grand Junction Railway.))

=== Negotiations ===
In September 1833 the GJR approached the W&NR regarding tolls and improvements to the W&NR line, before the end of the 1833 the W&NR suggested that the GJR could purchase its railway, and they set a high price, they were asking £125 for each £100 of stock as well as settlement of their debts of about £20,000.

The GJR declined, subsequent negotiation reduced this to £114 6s a share, but by August 1834 the GJR directors had broken off negotiations and expressed themselves disappointed that terms could not be reached.

They now considered an alternative route, by-passing the W&NR to the west with a crossing of the River Mersey at Fiddler's Ferry, this route had the disadvantage of by-passing Warrington, an important source of traffic, but it was 7 miles shorter to Liverpool and avoided the 1 mile (1.6 km) long 1 in 85 gradient south of Newton.

Warrington and Newton Railway Act 1835
- Act of Parliament
- Parliament of the United Kingdom
- Long title: An Act for incorporating the Warrington and Newton Railway with the Grand Junction Railway, and for extending to the said first-mentioned Railway the Provisions of the several Acts of Parliament relating to the said last-mentioned Railway; and for other Purposes relating thereto.
- Citation: 5 & 6 Will. 4. c. viii

Dates
- Royal assent: 12 June 1835

Other legislation
- Repealed by: London and North Western Railway Act 1846

Status: Repealed

Text of statute as originally enacted

=== Purchase ===
Terms were finally agreed in February 1835 the W&NR agreed to sell their line for shares at par, with the GJR adopting their outstanding debt of about £22,000.

The GJR undertook to pay the W&NR shareholders 4 per cent until their main line was open throughout: the purchase price was around £67,000, and the takeover was authorised by the Warrington and Newton Railway Act 1835 (5 & 6 Will. 4. c. viii) of 12 June 1835, effective from 1 January 1835. (Note: An Act for incorporating the Warrington and Newton Railway with the Grand Junction Railway, and for extending to the said first-mentioned Railway the Provisions of the several Acts of Parliament relating to the said last-mentioned Railway; and for other Purposes relating thereto.)

This act enabled the first railway 'take-over', as distinct from a legal amalgamation, and had the effect of making the former W&NR line the first part of the GJR to be operated.

== Grand Junction Railway ==
After the take-over the railway continued to work as usual but now under the auspices of the GJR stores committee while new arrangements were made. The GJR approached the L&MR in an effort to get them to lease the line, they were unwilling and despite some negotiation they declined.

In July 1835 the line was leased to George Stubs, who had been treasurer and general agent of the W&NR. Stubs seems to have had three locomotives to work the service, these were probably the original three Warrington, Newton and Achillies.

Stubs continued to operate the former W&NR until the GJR opened throughout, after handing it back he remained with the GJR for some time as its agent for Warrington.

By 1837 the former W&NR infrastructure had been upgraded with heavier rails, keys and chairs.

The GJR opened their line from Newton Junction to a temporary Birmingham terminus station at Vauxhall on 4 July 1837. The connection to the W&NR was made at a new passenger station at Bank Quay situated south of the turnpike. On the same day an east curve at Newton Junction was opened and direct running towards Manchester was now possible.

Bank Quay handled all the long-distance trains, Warrington Dallam Lane continued to be used for local passenger and goods services until 1839, when all passenger services were transferred to Bank Quay. Thereafter Warrington Dallam Lane became a goods station and coal yard.

=== Connections at Newton ===
Roscoe (1839) describes the operation of the GJR trains at Warrington Bank Quay:

The carriages for Liverpool and Manchester, which have come from Birmingham in one train, are here separated; and, while the Firefly continues to rush forward with those destined for Liverpool, the Comet, or some other locomotive of equally ominous name, flies off with the Manchester carriages in quick succession... The plan is this: the separate trains from Liverpool and Manchester arrive at Warrington a few minutes before the train from Birmingham; the locomotive which has come from Liverpool takes the united trains forward to Birmingham, while the engine which has brought its train from Manchester returns back again with the carriages which have arrived from Birmingham. (Note: Italics in original, Firefly and Comet are fictional GJR locomotive names.)

The two curves at Newton Junction had very tight radii, especially the east one of 660 feet (200 m) radius. Reed (1969) attributes building it so tight it obviated the necessity of a further Act of Parliament, by avoiding a land take. Within one week of the east curve opening Joseph Locke, Chief Engineer of the GJR, notified the GJR board his apprehensions of the effect the curve might have on six-wheeled engines, the curves subjected the locomotive axles to lateral bending stresses which caused breakages of the axles. Locke was instructed to repair the three locomotives lately used by Mr Stubs sufficiently to manage the Manchester traffic. (Note: These locomotives had not passed to the GJR, it is not known what their ownership was when Mr Stubs was using them, or subsequently. The locomotives were valued on 4 September 1834 by John Dixon, then civil engineer of the L&MR in anticipation of them being taken by Messrs. Tayleur and Stephenson.) (Note: A side effect of this problem was the introduction of Crewe type locomotives with outside cylinders and plain crank axles.)

The use of the east curve reduced considerably when the Manchester and Birmingham Railway opened from Manchester Store Street to Crewe on 10 August 1842. The east curve continued to be used by Manchester to Chester trains and those from the south heading further north than the Liverpool to Manchester line via the North Union Railway.

== After the Grand Junction Railway ==
The GJR amalgamated with London and Birmingham Railway and the Manchester and Birmingham Railway on 16 July 1846 to become part of the London and North Western Railway.

The L&NWR opened a direct line from Winwick, just north of Warrington, to Golborne, north of the former L&MR on the former WBR on 1 August 1864, this became known as the "Winwick cut-off", it simplified most of the long-distance north–south traffic by avoiding the junctions at Newton and Lowton providing a direct route. (Note: Lowton had probably opened in 1847 simplifying the north-south route by cutting out a reversal at Parkside.)

Passenger services from the south to Liverpool reduced dramatically in 1869 when the Runcorn Railway Bridge was opened by the L&NWR, although the Newton route was still used by some freight trains.

The former W&NR line remains in use from Warrington Bank Quay station to Earlestown.

== Accidents ==
On 21 October 1831 a passenger disembarked the train as it was passing his residence and was fatally injured.

In December 1841 a locomotive was sent from Bank Quay to collect a goods train from Dallam Lane, after admitting the locomotive to the branch the points were not reset and a freight train ran onto the branch and into the locomotive.

On 6 December 1837 a collision occurred when a GJR train from Birmingham ran into the back of a slow moving train of empty coal waggons belonging to Haydock Colliery at Winwick Quay. There was one fatality.

On 4 August 1854 a goods train from Warrington came to a stand on the Vulcan Bank, and the driver proceeded with half his train, leaving the other half standing on the main line; when a fast passenger train came into collision with the waggons so left, breaking two of them, slightly injuring one of its passengers, and bruising a few others.

On 28th September 1934 the Winwick rail crash occurred at Winwick Junction. An express from Euston to Blackpool, running under clear signals and at a normal speed of about 50 m.p.h., overtook and came into violent collision with the trailing end of a local, Warrington to Wigan via Earlestown train, which was moving forward at low speed resulting in 11 deaths and 19 injured.

== Bibliography ==
- Awdry, Christopher (1990). Encyclopaedia of British Railway Companies. Sparkford: Patrick Stephens Ltd. ISBN 1-8526-0049-7. OCLC 19514063. CN 8983.
- Baxter, Bertram (1978). Baxter, David (ed.). British Locomotive Catalogue 1825–1923. Vol. 2A: London and North Western Railway and its constituent companies. Ashbourne, Derbyshire: Moorland Publishing Company. ISBN 0-903485-51-6.
- Bradshaw, George (1843). Bradshaw's Railway Companion, containing the times of departure, fares, &c. of the railways in Great Britain and Ireland. London: Bradshaw's Railway Information Office.
- Carter, George A. (1971). Warrington and the Mid-Mersey valley. Manchester: E.J. Morten (Publishers). OCLC 1391890740.
- Dawson, Anthony (2020). The Liverpool and Manchester Railway : an operating history. Barnsley, South Yorkshire: Pen & Sword Transport. ISBN 978-1-4738-9913-1. OCLC 1204607582.
- Dendy Marshall, Chapman Frederick (1930). Centenary History of the Liverpool & Manchester Railway. London: Locomotive Publishing.
- Ferneyhough, Frank (1975). The History of Railways in Britain. Reading: Osprey. ISBN 0-85045-060-8. OCLC 2120140.
- Ferneyhough, Frank (1980). Liverpool and Manchester Railway 1830–1980. Clerkenwell Green, UK: Robert Hale Limited. ISBN 0709-18137-X.
- Grant, Donald J. (2017). Directory of the Railway Companies of Great Britain (1st ed.). Kibworth Beauchamp, Leicestershire: Troubador Publishing Ltd. ISBN 978-1-78803-768-6.
- Holt, Geoffrey O.; Biddle, Gordon (1986). The North West. A Regional history of the railways of Great Britain. Vol. 10 (2nd ed.). David St. John Thomas. ISBN 978-0-946537-34-1. OCLC 643506870.
- Pixton, Bob (1996). Warrington Railways. The Archive Photographs. Stroud: Chalford. ISBN 0-7524-0750-3.
- Reed, Brian (1969). Crewe to Carlisle. Shepperton, Surrey: Ian Allan. SBN 7110-0057-3.
- Roscoe, Thomas (1839). The Book of the Grand Junction Railway:Being a History and Description of the Line from Birmingham to Liverpool and Manchester.
- Singleton, David (1975). Liverpool and Manchester Railway : a mile by mile guide to the world's first "modern" railway. Clapham, N. Yorkshire: Dalesman. OCLC 1310749385.
- Thomas, R. H. G. (1980). The Liverpool & Manchester Railway. London: Batsford. ISBN 0-7134-0537-6.
- Quick, Michael (2023) [2001]. Railway passenger stations in Great Britain: a chronology (PDF). version 5.05. Railway & Canal Historical Society.
- Webster, N.W. (1970). Joseph Locke: Railway Revolutionary. George Allen & Unwin. ISBN 0043850553.
- Webster, Norman W. (1972). Britain's First Trunk Line:The Grand Junction Railway. Adams & Dart. SBN 239 00105 2.
