= Dallam Lane railway station =

Disused railway station in Dallam, Warrington

Dallam Lane
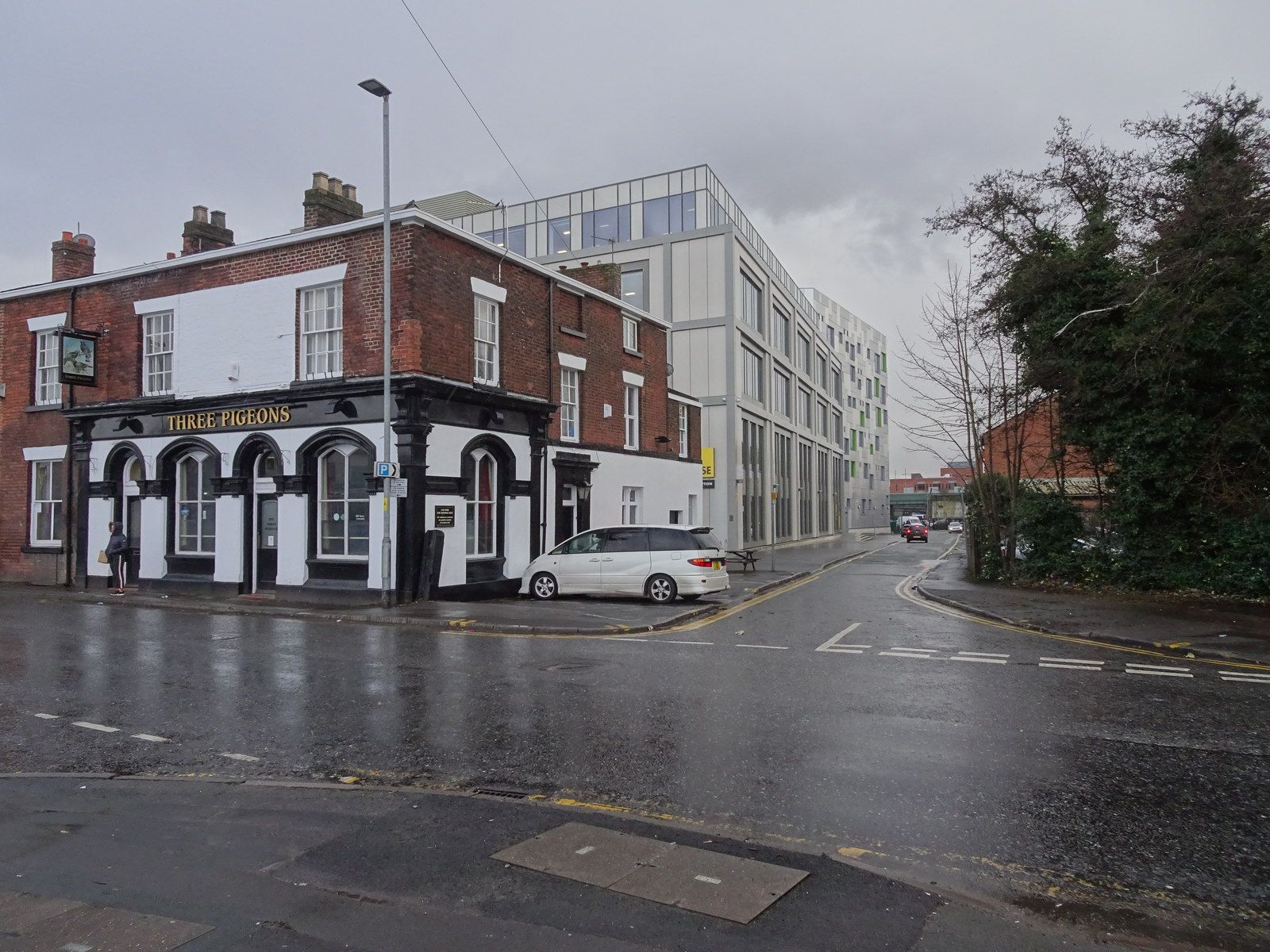
- The site of the station in 2020

General information
- Other names: Dallum Lane (contemporary spelling)
- Location: Dallam, Warrington; England
- Coordinates: 53.392789°N 2.595964°W
- Grid reference: SJ604886

Other information
- Status: Disused

History
- Original company: Warrington and Newton Railway; Grand Junction Railway
- Pre-grouping: London and North Western Railway

Key dates
- June 1831: Opened as Warrington
- 1839: Closed to passengers
- 9 August 1965: Closed completely
Location

Dallam Lane railway station served the town of Warrington, England from 1831 to 1839, firstly as part of the Warrington and Newton Railway and latterly part of the Grand Junction Railway. It was superseded by Warrington Bank Quay and subsequently became a goods station and coal yard.

== Opening ==
The station opened in June or July 1831. It is not certain exactly when, it was probably from when services started on the Warrington and Newton Railway (W&NR), there is also uncertainty about when that happened but it was likely to have been in June 1831 to cater for race-goers attending Newton races held on 1–3 June 1831.

Dallam Lane was the W&NR's southern terminus with the line's northern terminus to be at Newton Junction where it would connect to the Liverpool and Manchester Railway (L&MR).

The station was definitely open on 25 July 1831 when the W&NR made its connection to L&MR.

== Passenger station ==
The station was located on the eastern side of Dallam Lane between the junction of Dallam Lane and Foundry Street and Tanners Lane, effectively the area behind the Three Pigeons and the Tanners Lane Engine house. It was a two-storey red-brick building, trains entered at the end of the building and passengers from the side.

The Three Pigeons public house, (still extant in 2026) is frequently mentioned as 'possibly' having been the original booking office. Reed (1969) says that:

It has been surmised that the Three Pigeons, erected as a public house shortly before the railway, may have served by the good offices of the then landlord, as a booking office for the W. &. N. This seems unlikely; it is at the outer end of the whole station area, and with Warrington as it was in 1831–37 most passengers would come in at the town end from Bewsey Lane and Foundry Lane, and not along Tanner's Lane; and the station building would be of ample size to provide booking accommodation and a waiting room.

In 1835, the Grand Junction Railway (GJR) acquired the W&NR intending to use it to connect to the Liverpool and Manchester Railway (L&MR).

The GJR formally opened its line from Birmingham Vauxhall on 4 July 1837, it connected to the W&NR at a new station at Bank Quay which handled all the long-distance trains, Warrington Dallam Lane station continued to be used for local passenger and goods services until 1839, when all passenger services were transferred to Bank Quay.

== Goods station and coal yard ==
Once passenger services had transferred the station became a goods station and coal yard. The Ordnance Survey map of 1851 shows the area as being the 'Haydock coal yard' and the former station building area as 'Edge Green coal yard', there are several tracks mostly around the perimeter of the site. One of the coal yards was opened when the passenger station opened, it had an access from Foundry Street.

By 1904 it is listed as a London and North Western Railway (L&NWR) coal yard and there is an additional L&NWR goods depot at Marson Street, a short distance from Dallam Road station.

Both goods depots and their associated coal yards closed on 9 August 1965.

In 2016 a technical college opened on the site.

Preceding station	Disused railways	Following station
Winwick Quay; Line and station closed	Warrington and Newton Railway	Terminus

== Bibliography ==
- Brown, Joe (2021). Liverpool & Manchester Railway Atlas. Manchester: Crécy Publishing. ISBN 9780860936879. OCLC 1112373294.
- Carter, George A. (1971). Warrington and the Mid-Mersey valley. Manchester: E.J. Morten (Publishers). OCLC 1391890740.
- Grant, Donald J. (2017). Directory of the Railway Companies of Great Britain (1st ed.). Kibworth Beauchamp, Leicestershire: Troubador Publishing Ltd. ISBN 978-1-78803-768-6.
- Reed, Brian (1969). Crewe to Carlisle. Shepperton, Surrey: Ian Allan. SBN 7110-0057-3.
- Pixton, Bob (1996). Warrington Railways. The Archive Photographs. Stroud: Chalford. ISBN 0-7524-0750-3.
- Quick, Michael (2023) [2001]. Railway passenger stations in Great Britain: a chronology (PDF). version 5.05. Railway & Canal Historical Society.
- The Railway Clearing House (2001) [1904]. Railway Clearing House Atlas of England & Wales 1904. Hersham: Ian Allan. ISBN 978-0-7110-2778-7.
