= Warrington Bank Quay railway station =

Railway station in Cheshire, England

Warrington Bank Quay
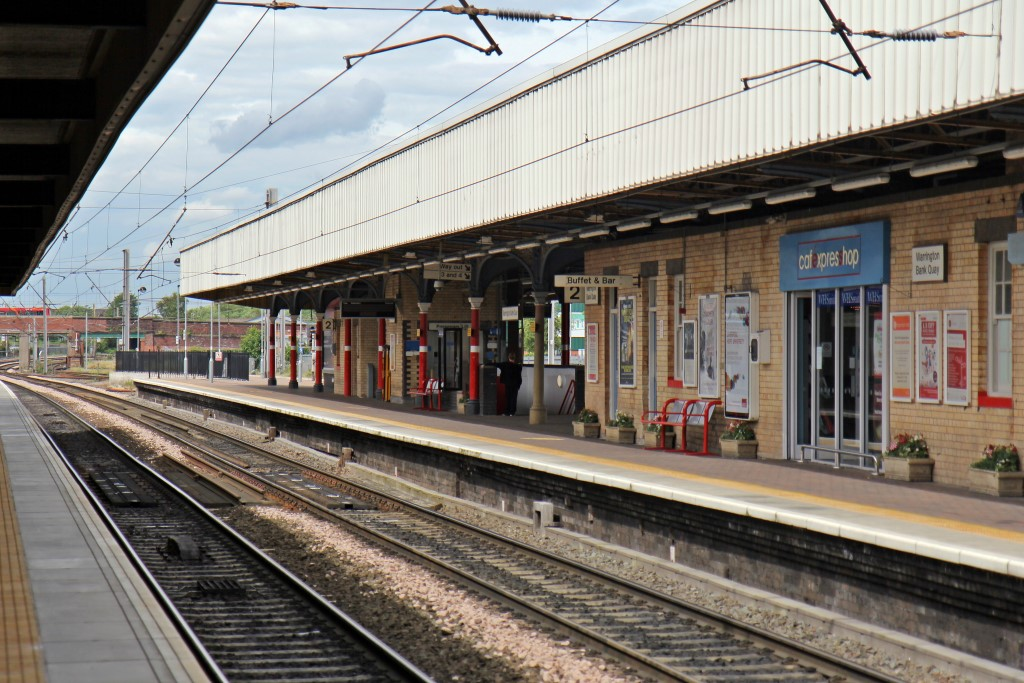
- The station in June 2014

General information
- Location: Warrington, Borough of Warrington, England
- Coordinates: 53.386°N 2.603°W
- Grid reference: SJ599878
- Manager: Avanti West Coast
- Platforms: 4

Other information
- Station code: WBQ
- Classification: DfT category B

History
- Original company: Grand Junction Railway
- Pre-grouping: London and North Western Railway
- Post-grouping: London, Midland and Scottish Railway

Key dates
- 4 July 1837: Station opened as Warrington
- 16 November 1868: Station relocated
- 16 November 1868: Low level platforms opened
- about 1870–1871: Station renamed Warrington Bank Quay
- 9 September 1963: Low level platforms closed

Passengers
- 2021/22: ▲0.959 million
- Interchange: ▲0.233 million
- 2022/23: ▲1.126 million
- Interchange: ▲0.468 million
- 2023/24: ▲1.241 million
- Interchange: ▲0.542 million
- 2024/25: ▲1.468 million
- Interchange: ▼0.395 million
- 2025/26: ▲1.556 million
- Interchange: ▲0.616 million
Location
Notes
- Passenger statistics from the Office of Rail and Road

Warrington Bank Quay is one of five railway stations serving the town of Warrington, in Cheshire, England. (Note: The other four are Warrington Central, Warrington West, Sankey for Penketh and Padgate.) It is a principal stop on the West Coast Main Line between London Euston and Glasgow Central. The station is north–south oriented, located to one side of the town's main shopping area.

== History ==
When the Warrington and Newton Railway (W&NR) came into being, it intended to open three branches:

- The initial line, opened in 1831, ran south from Newton-le-Willows to Warrington Dallam Lane, which became the town's first station
- The second W&NR branch diverged from the Dallam line at Jockey Lane and went to Bank Quay station. (Note: At the time, it was also written as "Bank Key".) This branch probably opened in 1835 and was used for goods and mineral traffic only, it terminated north of the Warrington to Liverpool turnpike (Note: It was then Bank Quay Road, now the A5061 Liverpool Road.)
- The third W&NR branch was never constructed.

In 1835, the Grand Junction Railway (GJR) acquired the W&NR making an end-on connection with the Bank Quay branch to expand northwards, using it to connect to the Liverpool and Manchester Railway (L&MR).

=== First station (1837 to 1868) ===
The first Warrington Bank Quay station opened on 4 July 1837, when the GJR formally opened its line from Birmingham Vauxhall to Earlestown where it connected to the L&MR. (Note: Earlestown station was, at the time, variously known as Viaduct, Newton Junction or Warrington Junction.)

The station was situated to the south of turnpike on the east (Warrington) side of the running lines. The turnpike had to be elevated onto a bridge, predictably known as Bank Quay bridge, to enable the end-on connection of the lines.

There was a platform in front of the station building and two island platforms, with four lines running through the station some of which were accessible from platforms on both sides. The station was described as having "a booking-office and ladies waiting room...with conveniences detached from the building" on the up side and two small waiting-rooms enclosed under a shed-roof on the down side. (Note: Down trains usually headed away from the major conurbation, usually London, some railway companies ran 'up' to their headquarters location. In this case 'up' trains were southbound towards Birmingham.)

The station had goods facilities to the north of the turnpike on both sides of the running lines. There were further freight facilities to the south of the station on the east side.

The station handled all the long-distance trains, Warrington Dallam Lane station continued to be used for local passenger and goods services until 1839, when all passenger services were transferred to Bank Quay.

In 1842, the station staff consisted of a superintendent, two clerks, a manager, three porters, one policeman, four shuntsmen, four coke and water fillers, one coach-greaser, and two gate-porters. In 1846, the GJR amalgamated with others to form the London and North Western Railway (LNWR).

=== Second station ===
In 1864, the LNWR absorbed the St Helens Canal and Railway Company (SHCR) which had opened a line between Runcorn Gap and Warrington Arpley in 1853–1854. Services were run on this line between Liverpool Lime Street and Manchester London Road.

This west-east line ran underneath the north-south LNWR line 300 yards (270 m) south of Bank Quay station using Warrington Arpley as their station in the town.

On 16 November 1868, the LNWR relocated Bank Quay station to the point where the lines crossed, effectively superimposing one station over the other to provide an interchange.

The station has a single-storey entrance building with subway access to two island platforms at a higher level. The LNWR station entrance was described as a "dowdy little brick entrance building."

When the new station opened, a local newspaper described the low-level platforms as "no more than a covered shed, open in front." Mr Banks, promoted from Dudley Port (also a two-level station), became the first station master of the relocated station.

The upper station had four through platforms. The central platforms were aligned to the fast lines and were often used by non-stopping trains. There was a bay platform facing north and a very small bay facing south. (Note: The platform numbering has changed over time.)

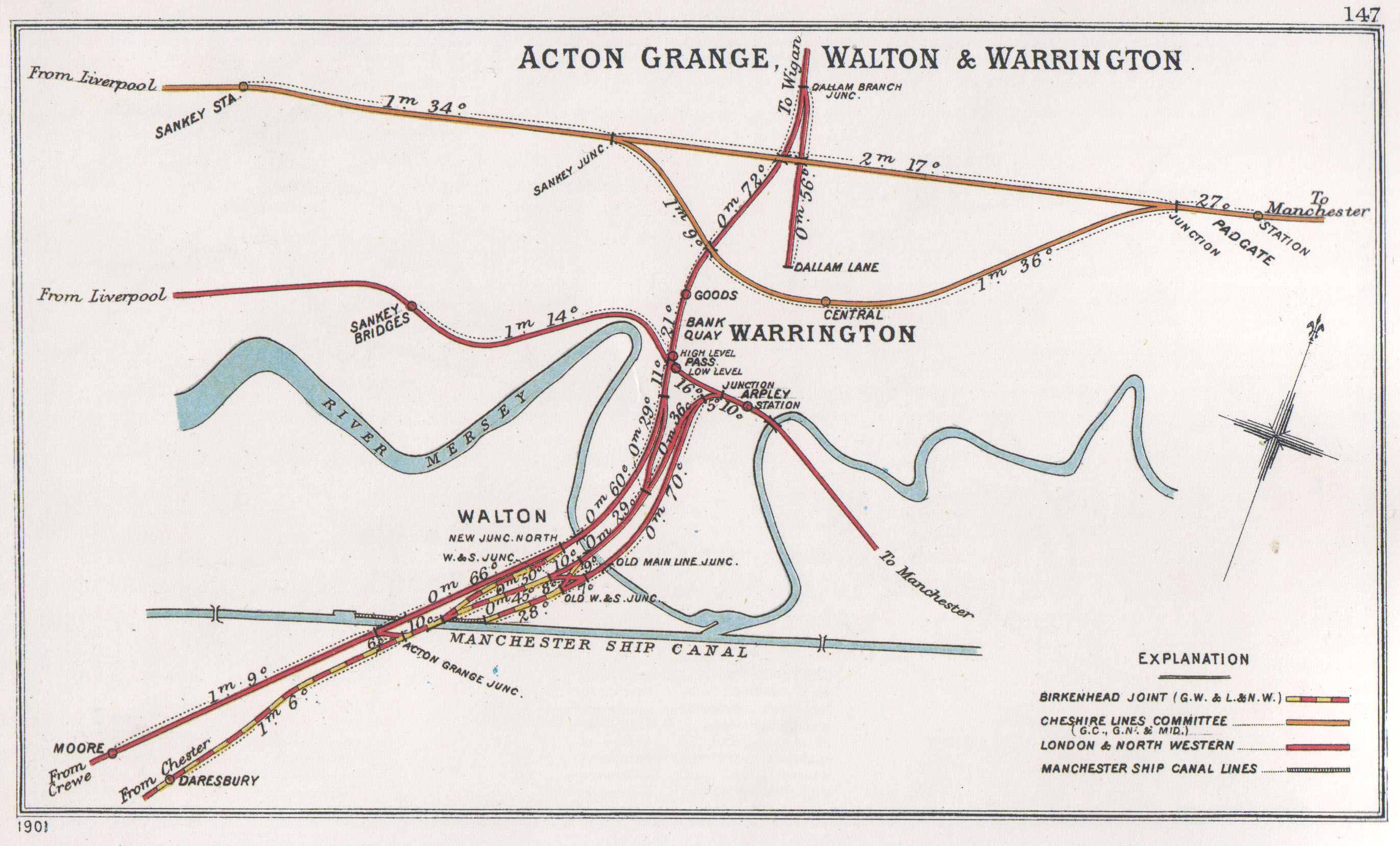
Acton Grange, Walton & Warrington RJD 147

The lower station had two through platforms, with a bay at the Manchester end of the eastbound platform. The lower platforms had a short canopy with ornate curved iron supports and a covered wooden footbridge.

Goods facilities gradually expanded and the area north of Bank Quay bridge increased in size and acquired a locomotive depot. The area between the running lines and Parker Street (Note: That is the area immediately east and north of the station.) was filled with goods sidings. When these became inadequate goods yards were built at Walton Old Junction (to the south of the station) and between the main north-south line and Arpley (to the east and south-east of the station).

The station was still called Warrington until at least 1870, when the Bank Quay suffix started to be used for the east-west line; it came into use on the north-south line later, but increasingly after Warrington Central opened in 1873. The terms low level and high level were used locally; they appeared in junction diagrams and some station handbooks, but were never part of an official title.

The station was enlarged in 1897, when new signals and signal boxes were provided.

The low level station was closed to passengers on 9 September 1963; the line through the station remains open for freight.

The station was rebuilt when the line was electrified in 1973, with a new power signal box covering an extended area was built east of the station for the electrification.

In 2009, a new entrance hall was completed, with a travel centre/ticket office and a shop; the buffet on the London-bound platforms was modernised. Improvements were made to the platforms and an extension to the existing car park and a new taxi rank were built.

=== Service history ===
Being situated on the West Coast Main Line, Bank Quay has had regular trains to a wide range of destinations including northbound to Perth, Aberdeen and Inverness and southbound to Birmingham New Street, London Euston, Plymouth Millbay and Penzance. However, there were several local passenger services that have ceased operation, including:

- Low level station service between Liverpool Lime Street and Manchester Piccadilly in 1962
- High level station service to Bolton Great Moor Street, via Kenyon Junction and Atherton Bag Lane in 1954
- High level station service to St Helens Shaw Street in 1964.

== Layout and facilities ==
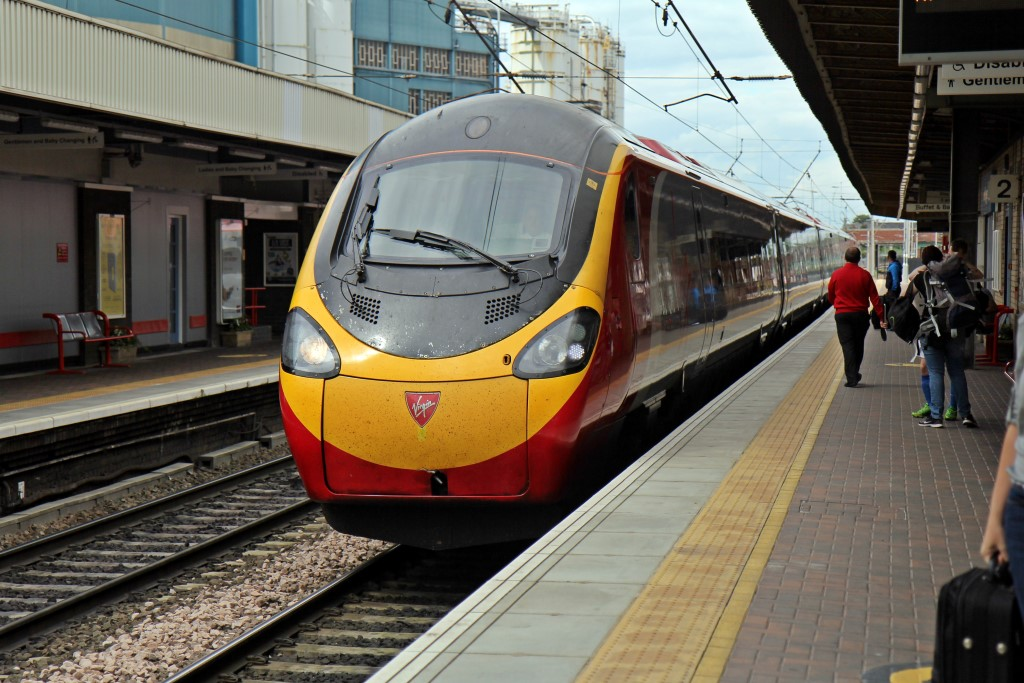
A Virgin Trains Class 390 Pendolino, at platform 2 (June 2014)

The current station has evolved from the second station; it is still on the same site with four high-level platforms, one each side of the two islands. The easternmost retains the 19th century buildings, with the western island's buildings dating from the 1950s.

Passengers enter the station at street level through a functional modern entrance containing an information office and ticket office, and proceed through a subway, reaching the elevated platforms by stairs or a lift. There is a buffet on the eastern platform. There is a dedicated car park for 282 vehicles and bicycle storage.

The platforms are numbered 1 to 4 from east to west, the two central lines, platforms 2 (up) and 3 (down) are the fast lines, with the outer platforms the slow.

== Services ==
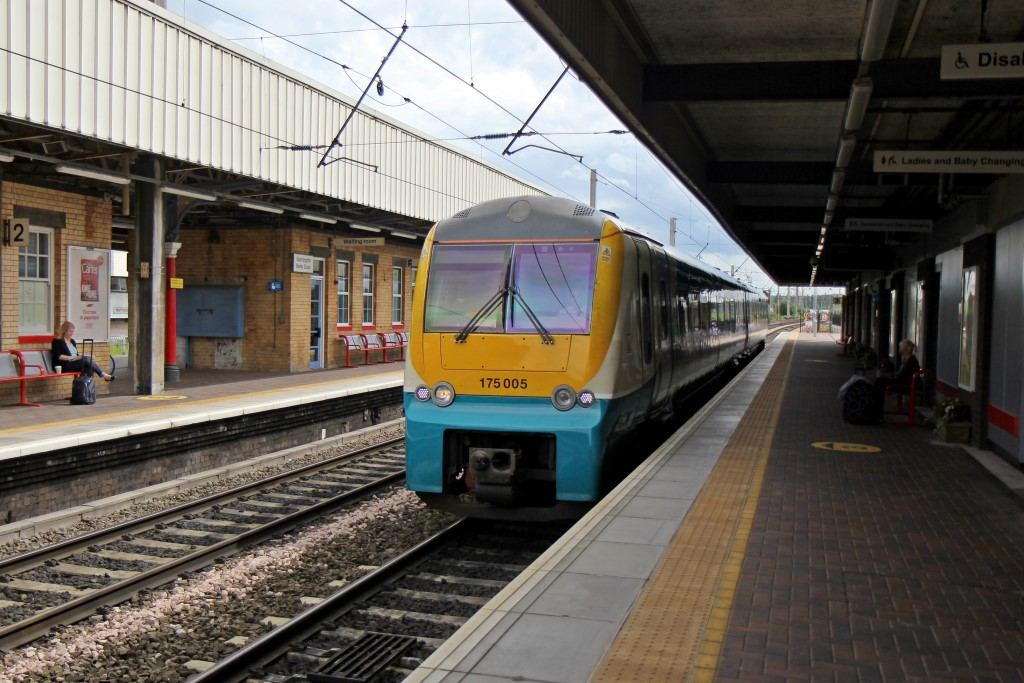
An Arriva Trains Wales Class 175, at platform 3 (June 2014)

The station is served by three train operating companies, which provide the following general off-peak service in trains per hour (tph):

Avanti West Coast:

- 2 tph to London Euston; of which:
  - 1 tph using the more direct Trent Valley line
  - 1 tph via Birmingham New Street
- 3 tp2h to Glasgow Central
- 1 tp2h to Edinburgh Waverley.

Northern Trains:

- 1 tph to Chester
- 1 tph to Leeds.

Transport for Wales:

- 1 tph to Manchester Airport, via Manchester Piccadilly
- 1 tph to Holyhead, via Chester and Llandudno Junction.

Preceding station	National Rail	Following station
Earlestown	Transport for Wales; Manchester Airport to Llandudno Junction and Holyhead	Runcorn East
Earlestown	Northern Trains; Chester–Leeds	Chester or Runcorn East
Wigan North Western	Avanti West Coast; West Coast Main Line	London Euston
Wigan North Western	Avanti West Coast; West Coast Main Line	Crewe
	Historical railways	
Daresbury; Line open, station closed	Birkenhead, Lancashire and Cheshire Junction Railway; Chester to Walton Junction line later Birkenhead Railway (LNWR & GWR joint)	Terminus
Moore; Line open, station closed	London and North Western Railway; Grand Junction Railway	Earlestown; Line open, station open
Sankey Bridges; Line open, station closed	St Helens Railway	Warrington Arpley; Line open, station closed
