= Winwick Quay railway station =

Short-lived railway station in Winwick, Warrington

Winwick Quay

General information
- Location: Winwick, Warrington; England
- Coordinates: 53.4209°N 2.6093°W
- Grid reference: SJ596917
- Platforms: 2

Other information
- Status: Disused

History
- Original company: Warrington and Newton Railway
- Pre-grouping: Grand Junction Railway

Key dates
- After July 1831: Opened
- 28 November 1840: Closed
Location

Winwick Quay railway station served the village of Winwick, near Warrington, England, from 1831 to 1840 on the Warrington and Newton Railway.

== History ==
The station was opened sometime after July 1831 by the Warrington and Newton Railway (W&NR), although it didn't appear in Bradshaw's timetables until August 1840 and had been removed by 1841.

It was probably situated to the east of the Sankey Canal adjacent to a canal repair facility and an inn, where Mill Lane passed under the railway.

Due to the station's remote location, it never attracted many passengers so the decision to close it was made on 25 November 1840 and official closure occurred on 28 November 1840.

== Bibliography ==
- Bradshaw, George (1839). Bradshaw's Railway Time Tables and assistant to railway Travelling with illustrative maps & plans. London: Shepherd and Sutton, and Wyld.
- Bradshaw, George (1840). Bradshaw's Railway Companion, containing the times of departure, fares, &c. of the railways in England. Manchester: Bradshaw & Blacklock.
- Bradshaw, George (1841). Bradshaw's Railway Companion, containing the times of departure, fares, &c. of the railways in England (PDF). Manchester: Bradshaw & Blacklock.
- Hartless, Adrian (2017). Crewe to Wigan : including Over & Wharton. Midhurst, West Sussex: Middleton Press. ISBN 9781910356128. OCLC 1391400402.(Book has no page numbers)
- Quick, Michael (2023) [2001]. Railway passenger stations in Great Britain: a chronology (PDF). version 5.05. Railway & Canal Historical Society.
