= Walkden Low Level railway station =

Former railway station in England

Walkden Low Level

General information
- Location: Walkden, City of Salford; England
- Coordinates: 53.5186°N 2.3978°W
- Grid reference: SD737025
- Platforms: 2

Other information
- Status: Disused

History
- Original company: London and North Western Railway
- Pre-grouping: London and North Western Railway
- Post-grouping: London Midland and Scottish Railway

Key dates
- 1 April 1875: Station opened as "Walkden"
- June 1924: Renamed "Walkden Low Level"
- 29 March 1954: Station closed
Location

Walkden Low Level railway station served the town of Walkden, City of Salford, Greater Manchester, England.

== History ==
The station was opened as "Walkden" in 1875 by the London and North Western Railway on its new line from Roe Green Junction to Bolton Great Moor Street. It was renamed Walkden Low Level to distinguish it from the nearby ex-Lancashire and Yorkshire Railway's Walkden High Level station in June 1924. The station had two platforms reached by four ramps with waiting rooms and canopy on each, and offices on the north side. The railway company proposed naming the station "Walkden Stocks" but was overruled by the Local Board. Regular passenger services ceased in 1954 but the line continued to be used for freight traffic for some further time.

The station was about one mile north of Roe Green and close by there were sidings and a connection to the Bridgewater Estates colliery railway at Barrack's Tramway Junction.

Preceding station	Disused railways	Following station
Little Hulton; Line and station closed	London and North Western Railway	Worsley; Line and station closed
