= Manchester Exchange railway station =

Former railway station in Salford, England

Coordinates: 53.4861°N 2.2463°W

Manchester Exchange
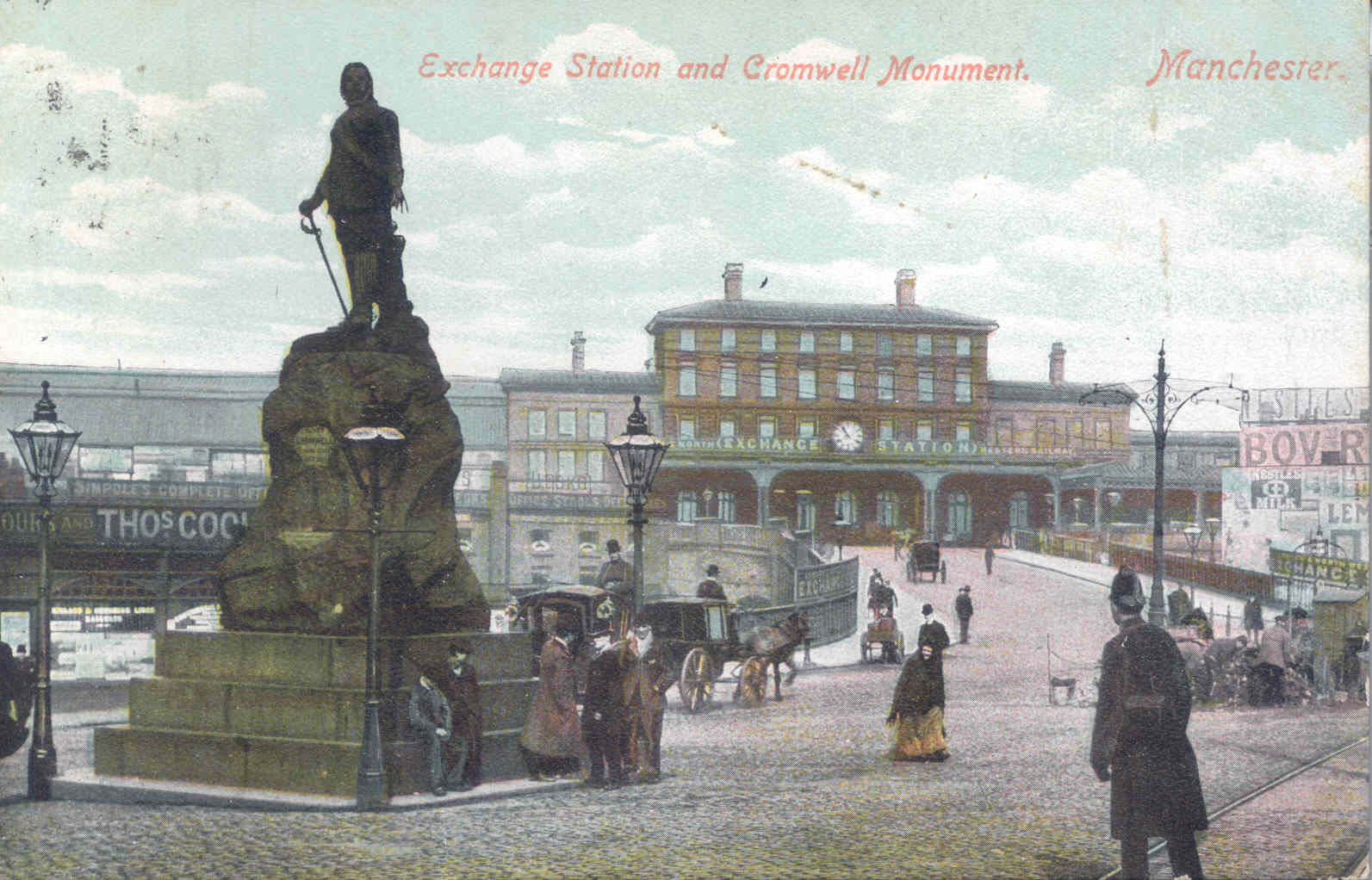
- A postcard illustration of the station in 1904, seen looking up Cathedral Approach

General information
- Location: Salford, City of Salford; England
- Grid reference: SJ837988
- Platforms: 5

Other information
- Status: Disused

History
- Original company: London and North Western Railway
- Pre-grouping: London and North Western Railway
- Post-grouping: London, Midland and Scottish Railway; London Midland Region of British Railways

Key dates
- 30 June 1884: Opened
- 16 April 1929: Platform 3 extended to link with Victoria platform 11
- 5 May 1969: Closed to passengers
- 1980s: completely closed
Location

Manchester Exchange was a railway station immediately north of Manchester city centre, England, which served it between 1884 and 1969. The main approach road ran from the end of Deansgate, near Manchester Cathedral, passing over the River Irwell, the Manchester-Salford boundary and Chapel Street; a second approach road led up from Blackfriars Road. Most of the station lay in Salford, with only the 1929 extension to platform 3 east of the Irwell in Manchester.

== Construction and opening ==
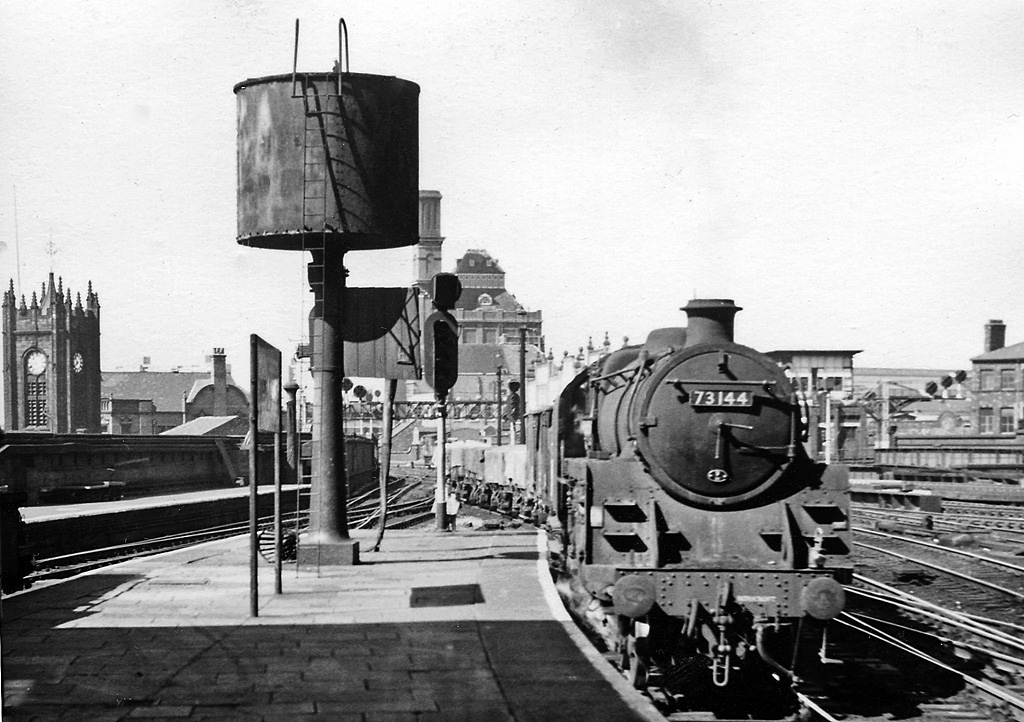
Eastbound goods train in 1966

The station was built by the London and North Western Railway (LNWR) and opened on 30 June 1884. The station had five platforms: 1 and 2 were bays and 3, 4 and 5 were through. Platforms 4 and 5 were reached by a footbridge from near to the station entrance. The opening of Exchange station allowed the LNWR to vacate Manchester Victoria station to the east, which it (and its predecessors, including the Liverpool and Manchester Railway) had shared with the Lancashire and Yorkshire Railway and its predecessors since 4 May 1844.

From 16 April 1929, Exchange had a platform link with the adjacent Victoria, when an eastward extension of platform 3 over the Irwell bridge was opened, meeting Victoria's platform 11; this created Europe's longest platform at 2,238 feet (682 m), which could accommodate three trains at once.

== Services ==
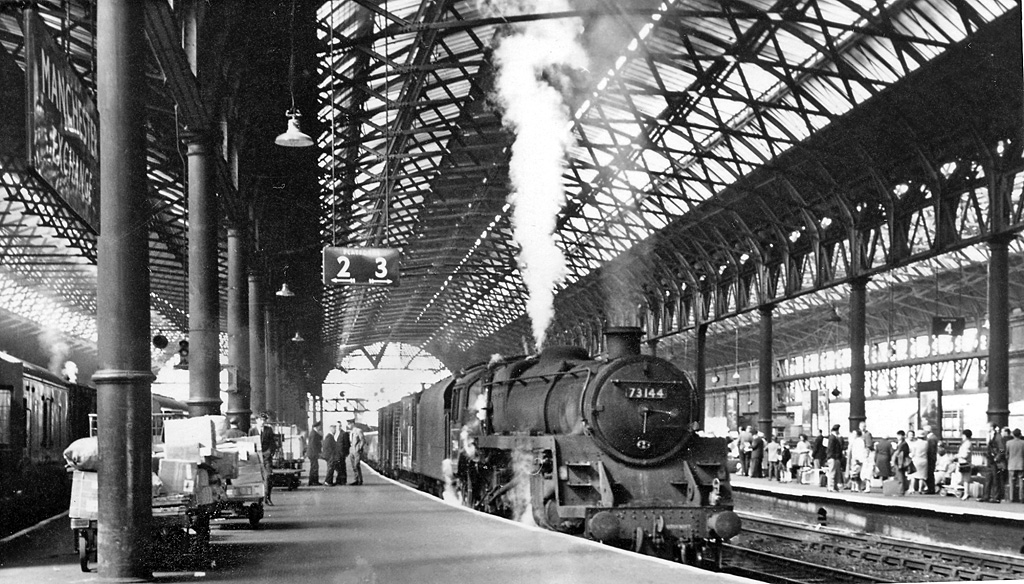
View westward, along platforms 2/3 in 1966

Exchange station provided trains to Liverpool Lime Street, North Wales, Warrington Bank Quay, Chester General, Huddersfield, Leeds, Hull Paragon and Newcastle Central. Local LNWR passenger trains operated to Bolton Great Moor Street via Walkden and to Wigan North Western via Tyldesley.

The station originally provided alternative services from Manchester to London Euston. Between 1884 and 1943, the Great Western Railway operated a competing passenger train service from Chester General station via Frodsham, Warrington Bank Quay and Eccles to Manchester Exchange.

Preceding station	Disused railways	Following station
Ordsall Lane; Line open, station closed	London and North Western Railway	Manchester Victoria; Line and station open

== Second World War damage ==
The station suffered hits by several German incendiary bombs during the Christmas 1940 Manchester Blitz. On 22 December, the station roof was severely damaged, portions of which were never replaced. Fires took extensive hold on the building which could not be re-opened for passengers until 13 January 1941.

== Closure ==
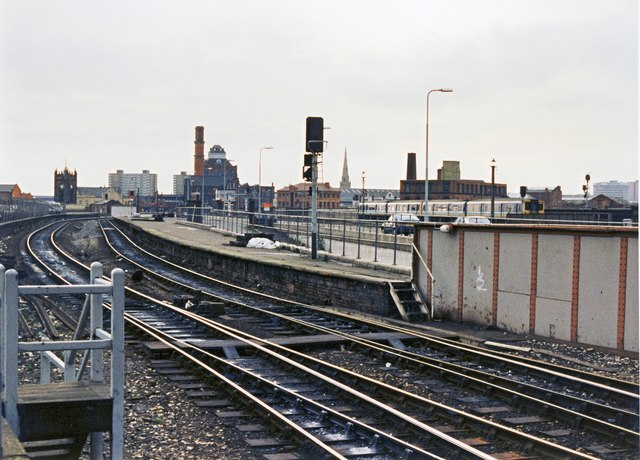
Remains of the station in 1989

The station was closed on 5 May 1969 and all remaining services were redirected to Manchester Victoria.

Despite closure, it remained operational for newspaper trains until the 1980s. Manchester produced several Northern editions until the newspaper revolution. The night-time operation was very busy, with several trains being loaded and readied for departure to various trans-Pennine destinations; these included Halifax, Huddersfield, Leeds and York.

The station remained relatively intact after closure, with trains still running beneath the train shed through platforms 3, 4 and 5. Platforms 1 and 2 operated as a car park for some years. The trainshed was demolished in the early 1980s; the tracks were lifted in 1993, during the rationalisation of Victoria station.

== The site today ==
In July 2017, Q-Park opened a brand new car park called Deansgate North, restoring the station's original red brickwork.

Much of the site has now been redeveloped as office and residential blocks, as part of the Greengate regeneration scheme.

== Location maps ==
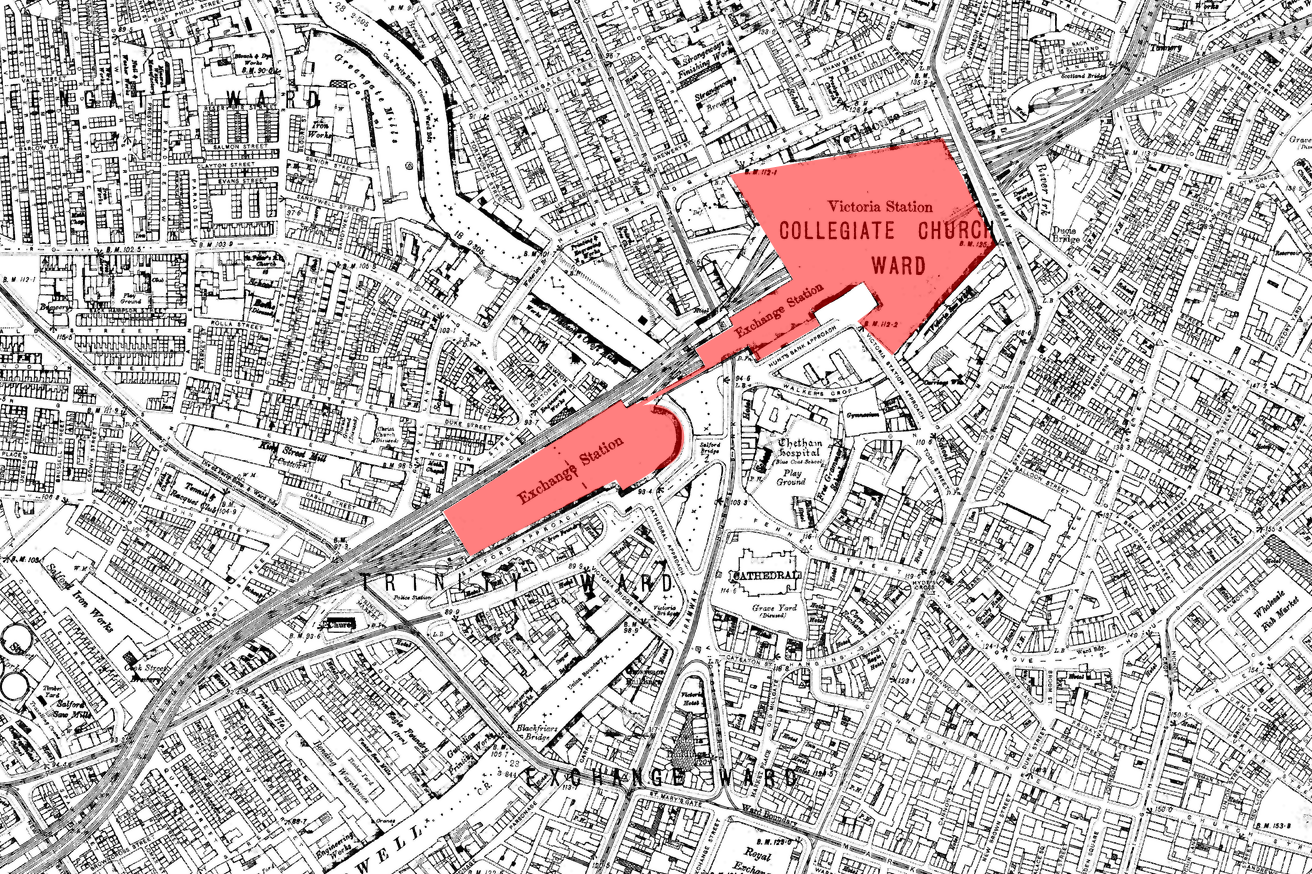
An Ordnance Survey map from 1889 showing the Manchester Exchange and Victoria station complex (note the platform link over the River Irwell)

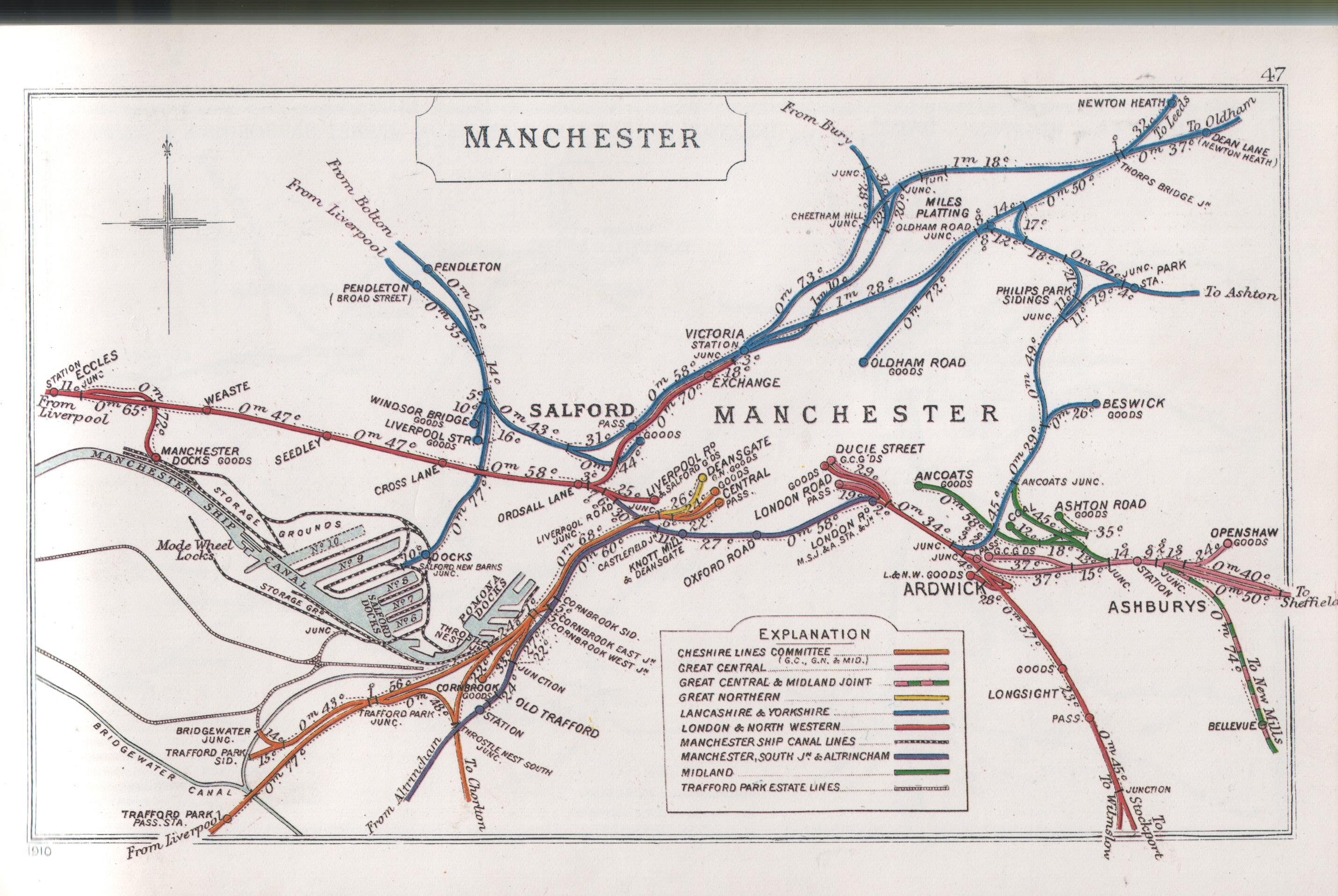
A Railway Clearing House 1910 map of central Manchester showing the railway system at that date; the position of Exchange station is marked in red at the end of the LNWR line from Liverpool via Eccles)
