= Bolton Great Moor Street railway station =

Disused railway station in Bolton, Greater Manchester, England

Bolton, Great Moor Street
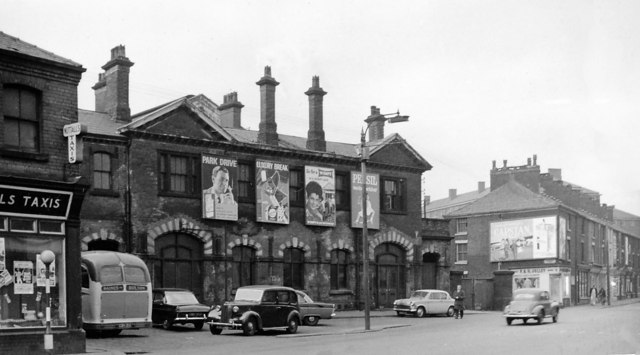
- Great Moor Street Station

General information
- Location: Bolton, Bolton; England
- Coordinates: 53.5754°N 2.4310°W
- Grid reference: SD716088
- Platforms: 4

Other information
- Status: Disused

History
- Original company: Bolton and Leigh Railway
- Pre-grouping: London and North Western Railway
- Post-grouping: London, Midland and Scottish Railway

Key dates
- 11 June 1831: Opened as Bolton
- October 1849: Renamed Bolton Great Moor Street
- 1 August 1871: Closed for rebuilding
- 1 April 1875: Reopened
- 29 March 1954: Closed to regular passenger traffic
- 9 July 1958: Last holiday excursion departed
Location

Bolton Great Moor Street railway station was the first station in Bolton. It was opened on 11 June 1831 by the Bolton and Leigh Railway.

Originally named Bolton, it was renamed Bolton Great Moor Street in October 1849. The original street level station was replaced by a temporary station at Bolton Crook Street Goods Yard on 1 August 1871 while the new station was built in a classic Italian style. It opened either on 1 April 1875 or on 28 September 1874 on the same site as the original station but at a higher level. The rebuilt station had four platforms covered by a roof. Its reconstruction coincided with the building of the direct line to Manchester Exchange via Walkden Low Level by the London and North Western Railway which opened on 1 April 1875.

Local trains to and from Kenyon Junction via Chequerbent used the station's western platforms 1 & 2 whilst trains to and from Manchester Exchange via Walkden used Platforms 3 & 4.

The station closed for regular passenger use by British Railways on 29 March 1954, although holiday and football specials ran until 1958 and an unadvertised workmen's service to Monton Green continued for some months. An enthusiasts' special visited on 21 September 1963 and on 9 May 1964 another visited the adjacent Crook St goods yard, this was the last passenger train on LNWR lines in the Bolton area.

Tracks in the station were lifted in April 1964. The station was demolished in October 1966 and the area redeveloped.

== See also ==
- B. Hick and Sons

Preceding station	Disused railways	Following station
Terminus	London and North Western Railway via Roe Green Junction	Plodder Lane; Line and station closed
Terminus	London and North Western Railway; Bolton and Leigh line	Rumworth and Daubhill; Line and station closed
