= Moses Gate Country Park =

Park in Moses Gate, Greater Manchester, England

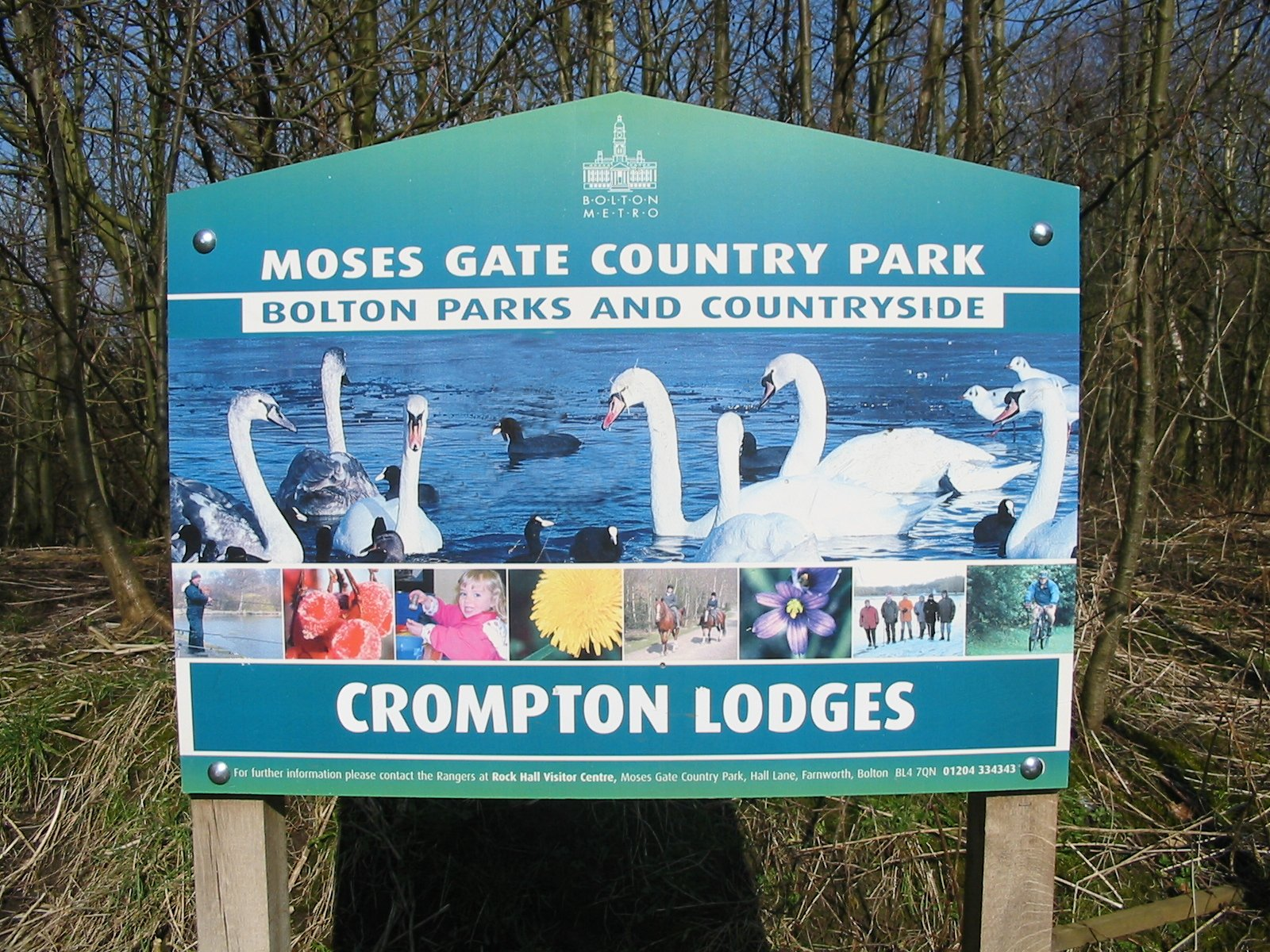
- Bolton MBC sign at Crompton Lodges
- Interactive map of Moses Gate Country Park
- Type: public park and nature reserve
- Location: Moses Gate, Farnworth, England
- Coordinates: 53.5527°N 2.3803°W
- Area: 300 hectares
- Created: 1975
- Operator: Bolton MBC
- Status: open all year

Moses Gate Country Park, part of which is also known as Crompton Lodges, (National Grid Ref: SD 749063) is a 750 acre (300 hectare) site situated at Moses Gate in the Croal and Irwell Valleys 3 miles (4.8 km) south of Bolton town centre on the A6053 road which connects Farnworth to Little Lever. It is a Local Nature Reserve.

== Description ==
The park runs from the A6053 to Nob End along the banks of the River Croal. At Nob End, the Croal joins the Irwell which then continues for about two miles into Clifton Country Park. The name Moses Gate comes from the joining of two words, one a corruption of the word mosses meaning peaty or marshy lands, and gate is from the Old English gata meaning a way across, so we have the way through the mosses (also as in Kearsley Moss, Clifton Moss, Linnyshaw Moss, etc.). The alternate name of Crompton Lodges comes from the lakes which were mill ponds or lodges supplying water to Cromptons Paper Mills. The park lies on the Kingfisher Way which runs for 11 km (6.8 mi) from Clifton Country Park to Jumbles Reservoir, north of Bolton. There are three lodges, one is reserved for fishing, one for water sports such as canoeing and the third is a nature reserve for migratory birds and other wildlife.
To the east of the lodges is one of the few sections of the Manchester, Bolton and Bury Canal that is still in water. The land between is reclaimed from old mine workings, one of which was Farnworth Bridge Collieries. The weir was constructed in the River Croal to provide a water supply for Crompton's Paper Mill. For many years Rock Hall was the visitor centre and the headquarters of the park's rangers, before closing when the ranger service was shut down in 2014. The property is now (in 2020) in a neglected state, with a sign offering it for commercial leasing, although the council still expresses an interest in restoring it for use at some point.

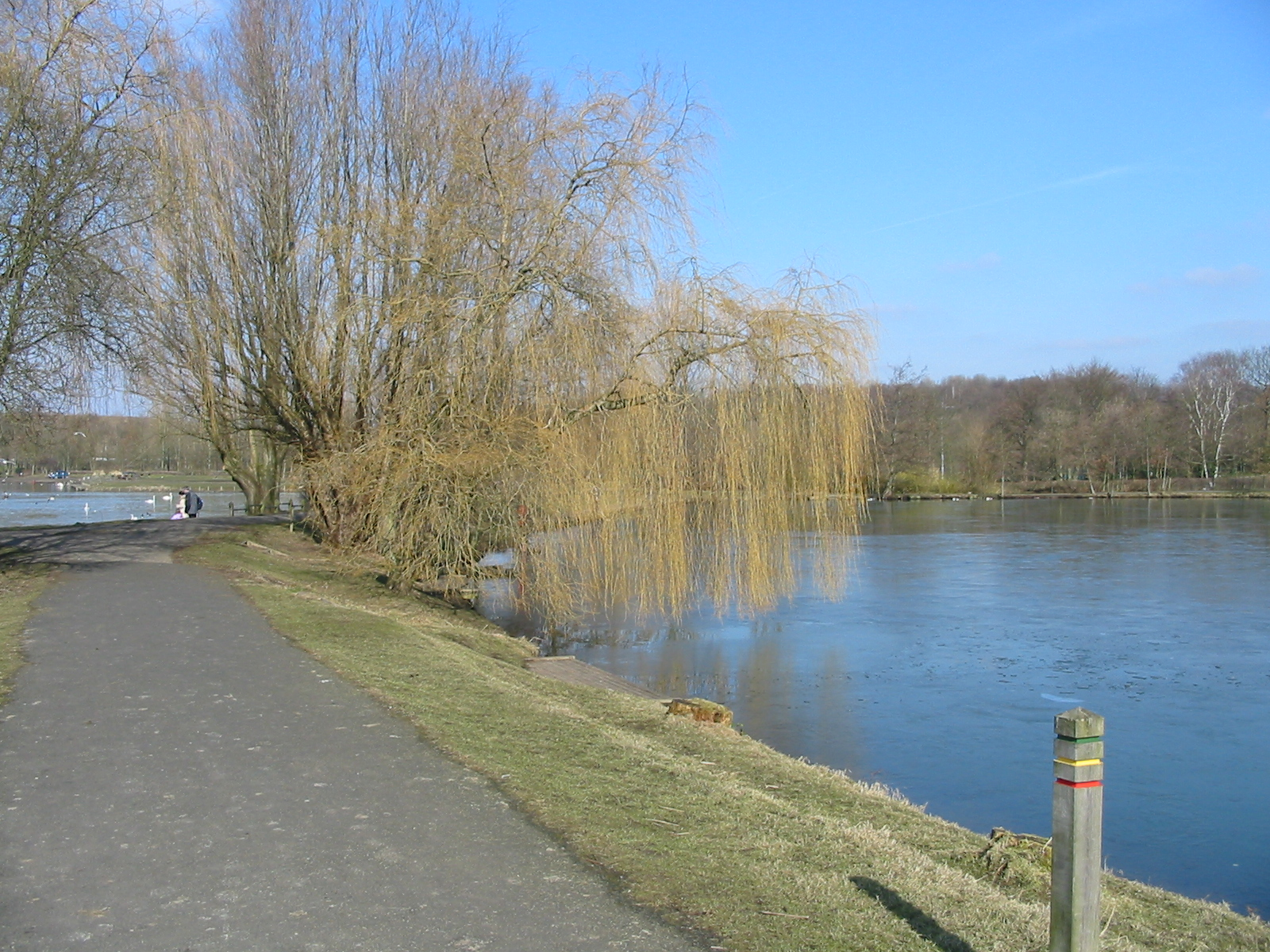
View of the main lodges

== History ==
The area has seen several uses as an industrial site, at Moses Gate, one of the earliest paper mills in Lancashire was built by the Crompton family in Farnworth. The site at Farnworth was influential in the manufacture and the development of papermaking, the first work being started by Robert Crompton (1667–1737). Crompton was the first in a line of men of paper. Thomas Bonsor could well be called the first papermaking tycoon and his mill at Farnworth became a showpiece for the craft, he died on 5 September 1858 and was buried in the churchyard of St John the Evangelist's Church, Farnworth. The first steam weaving mill was opened in 1828 by James Rothwell Barnes, later becoming a spinning mill. At Nob End a chemical works was founded and the whole area is riddled with old coal mine workings from shallow pits to deep shafts which have all now been capped. The mill at Farnworth passed to William James Rideout who continued the tradition of making paper until the great depression of 1883 when the mill closed and paper manufacture ceased. In 1894, the mill was reopened as a bleach works by J. B. Champion but a few years later the mill once again stood empty. The area fell into ruin and it was not until the mill was finally demolished in 1972, that there was interest in the area as a place of recreation. Over the next decade, the site was cleared and Rock Hall was transformed from a derelict building into the current visitor centre.

== Rock Hall ==
Rock Hall was built by Thomas Bonsor Crompton's father John, who was granted the lease in 1805. John never lived in the house as he died at about the time the house was completed in 1807. Later it was occupied by the managers of the paper mill. On Thomas Bonsor's death the mill passed to his nephew W.J. Rideout, then after his death in 1876, the mills were offered for auction.

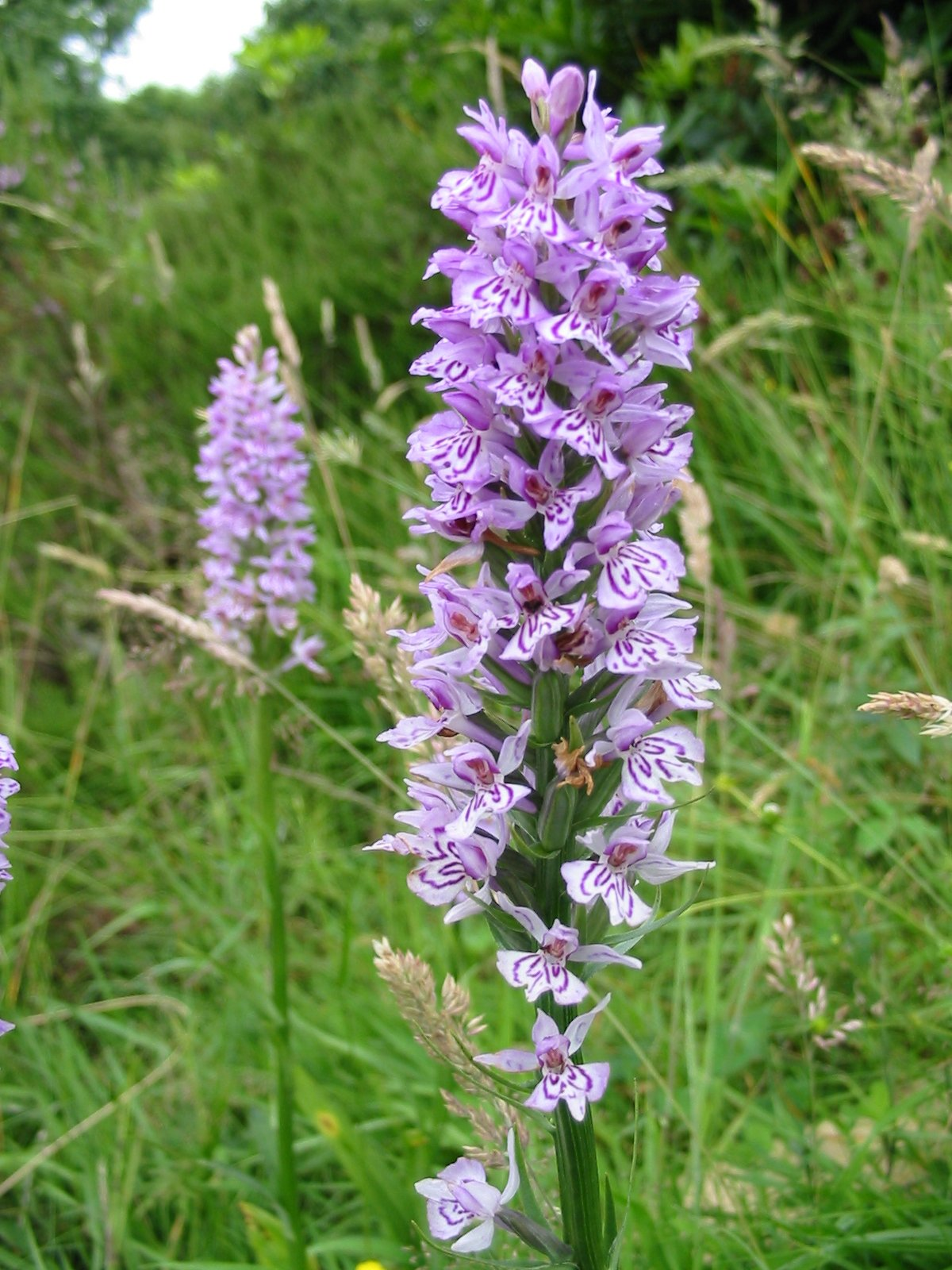
Orchid at Nob End

== Nob End ==
Nob End was designated as a Site of Special Scientific Interest (SSSI) (file designation SD70/2) in 1988, under Section 28 of the Wildlife and Countryside Act, 1981. and as a Local Nature Reserve (LNR) in 2000. The contamination of the land from the old chemical works with waste from the Leblanc process has resulted in an alkaline soil that now supports a variety of plants not found elsewhere in Greater Manchester, including many types of orchid, most notable amongst these are Fragrant orchid Gymnadenia conopsea, the Northern Marsh orchid Dactylorhiza purpurella, the Early Marsh orchid Dactylorhiza incarnata and other species such as Common Broomrape, Twayblade, Blue fleabane and Carline thistle. The reserve covers 8.8 hectares (22 acres).

== General references ==
- Croal Irwell Regional Park Project (June 2003). Creating a green artery from the centre of Manchester to the West Pennine Moors (PDF). Archived from the original (PDF) on 8 October 2006.
