= Barium ruthenate =

Identifiers
CAS Number	12009-17-5
3D model (JSmol)	Interactive image
EC Number	234-544-7
PubChem CID	19003779
CompTox Dashboard (EPA)	DTXSID80152672
- InChI: InChI=1S/Ba.3O.Ru/q+2;3*-2;+4 Key: LHLZHLRVCCLSMQ-UHFFFAOYSA-N
- SMILES: [O-2].[O-2].[O-2].[Ru+4].[Ba+2]

Properties
Chemical formula	BaO_{3}Ru
Molar mass	286.39 g·mol^{−1}
Appearance	black solid

Hazards
- GHS labelling
Pictograms	(GHS07: Exclamation mark)
Signal word	Warning
Hazard statements	H302, H332
Precautionary statements	P261, P264, P270, P271, P301+P317, P304+P340, P317, P330, P501
- Except where otherwise noted, data are given for materials in their standard state (at 25 °C [77 °F], 100 kPa). Infobox references

Barium ruthenate is an inorganic compound, with the chemical formula BaRuO_{3}. It can be obtained from the stoichiometric reaction of barium oxide and ruthenium(IV) oxide at temperatures below 1200 °C, or from the thermal decomposition of Ba[Ru(NO)(NO_{2})_{4}(OH)]·xH_{2}O. It reacts with ruthenium and ruthenium(IV) oxide at 1250 °C to obtain black needle-like crystal BaRu_{6}O_{12}. Hydrogen or zirconium can reduce it when heated to produce metal ruthenium.

== External reading ==
- Darriet, J.; Dussarrat, C.; Weill, F.; Darriet, B.; Bontchev, R. (1993). "The system BaRuO_{3}-BaBiO_{3} I Crystal structures of Ba_{3}Ru_{2}BiO_{9} and Ba_{2}Ru_{x}Bi_{2-x}O_{6} (0". European Journal of Solid State and Inorganic Chemistry. 30 (3): 273–286.
