= Mixed metal oxide electrode =

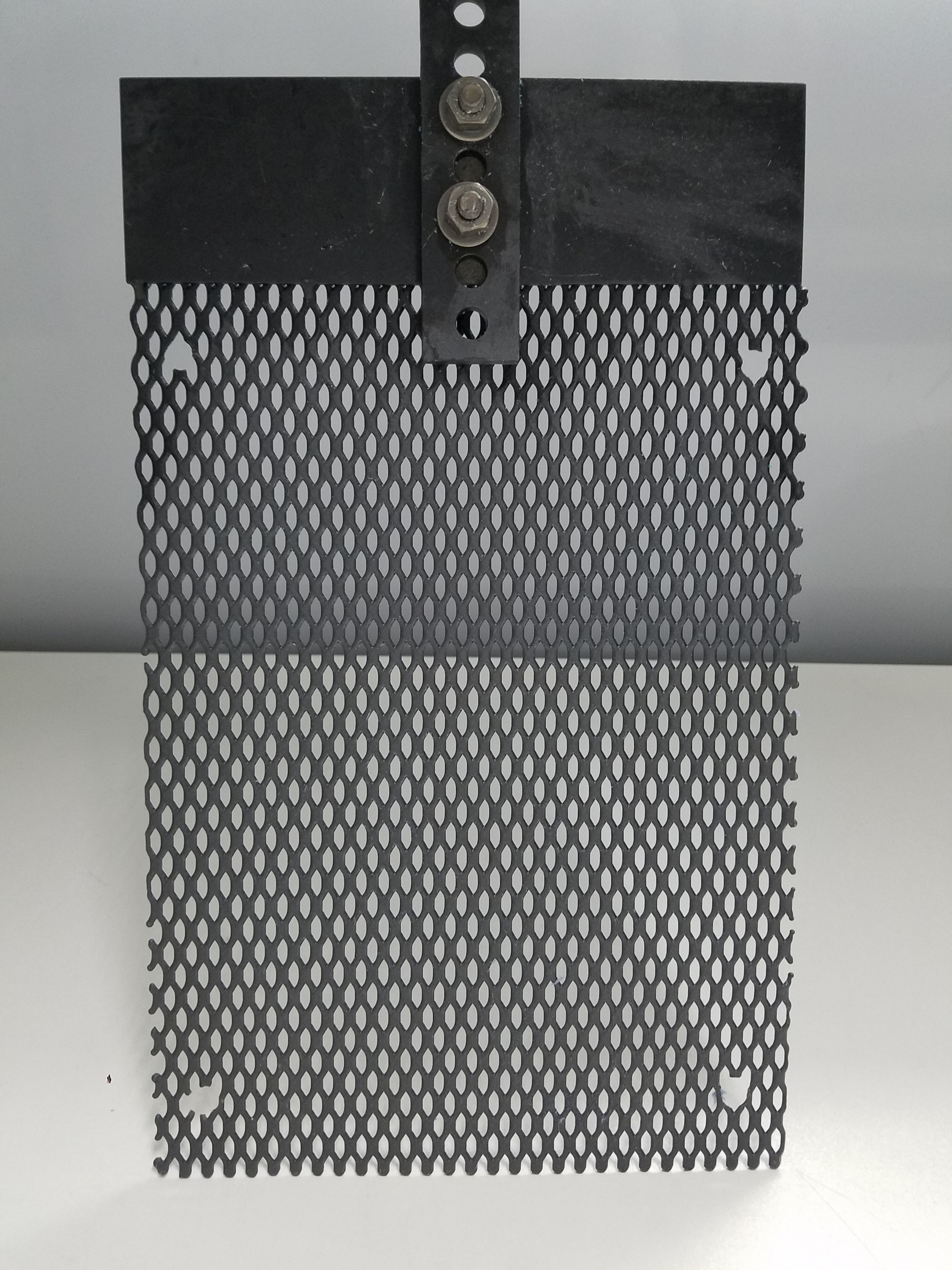
Mesh MMO anode used for electroplating

Mixed metal oxide (MMO) electrodes, also called Dimensionally Stable Anodes (DSA), are devices with high conductivity and corrosion resistance for use as anodes in electrolysis. They are made by coating a substrate, such as pure titanium plate or expanded mesh, with several kinds of metal oxides. One oxide is usually RuO_{2}, IrO_{2}, or PtO_{2}, which conducts electricity and catalyzes the desired reaction such as the production of chlorine gas. The other metal oxide is typically titanium dioxide which does not conduct or catalyze the reaction, but is cheaper and prevents corrosion of the interior.

The loading or amount of precious metal on the substrate (that is, other than the titanium) can be in the order of around 10 to 12 grams per square metre.

== Applications ==
Applications include use as anodes in electrolytic cells for producing free chlorine from saltwater in swimming pools, in electrowinning of metals, in printed circuit board manufacture, electrotinning and zinc electro-galvanising of steel, as anodes for cathodic protection of buried or submerged structures.

== History ==
Henri Bernard Beer registered his patent on mixed metal oxide electrodes in 1965. The patent named "Beer 65", also known as "Beer I", which Beer claimed the deposition of Ruthenium oxide, and admixing a soluble titanium compound to the paint, to approximately 50% (with molar percentage RuO_{2}:TiO_{2} 50:50). His second patent, Beer II, reduced the Ruthenium oxide content below 50%.

== See also ==
- Chloralkali process
