= Henri Bernard Beer =

Henri B. Beer
- Born: April 7, 1909; Amsterdam
- Died: 1994 (aged 84–85)
- Occupation: Inventor
- Years active: 1952-1972
- Known for: Mixed metal oxide electrodes

Henri Bernard Beer (born April 7, 1909 in Amsterdam, died 1994) was a Dutch inventor and business man. He is known in electrochemistry as the inventor of the mixed metal oxides (MMO) coatings onto titanium, and the creator of two patents known as Beer I and Beer II. He was awarded the Vittorio de Nora-Diamond Shamrock award in 1980, and an honorary doctorate degree by the Eindhoven University of Technology, the Netherlands in 1986.

== Titanium-based electrodes ==
Henri Beer was working from 1957 to 1972 at the company Magneto Chemie (since 2002, Magneto Special Anodes, in The Netherlands), where he investigated the possibilities of coating titanium with a precious metal or precious metal oxide; he found this could be used to replace graphite in a chlor-alkali cell. He first experimented with rhodium electroplated onto titanium, and filed a patent on this. Almost simultaneously, but independently, J.B. Cotton's group in the Metals Division of ICI filed a patent on platinum electrodeposited onto titanium. The small-sized Magneto Chemie started collaborating with the much larger ICI on the development of titanium-based electrodes. Beer working at Magneto focussed on coating formulations, whereas others were working on the commercial viability of coatings onto titanium electrodes.

The platinum electroplated titanium electrodes had a large overpotential for chlorine evolution. The next step was moving from platinum electroplated titanium to platinum-iridium mixtures applied using the paint-thermal decomposition method. This eventually resulted in a platinum-iridium Pt/Ir 70/30 composition, with a much lower overpotential for chlorine evolution.

== Patents ==
In 1965, Beer proposed another change in coating: application of ruthenium oxide onto titanium, and filed his first patent on mixed metal oxide coatings, known as Beer 1. That patent described the co-deposition of titanium and ruthenium oxides. Beer sold his technological concepts to the Italian company De Nora. In 1967, the Beer 2 patent followed, which covered the optimal, stabilized ruthenium-titanium oxide mixture (RuO_{2}/TiO_{2}) for chlorine evolution in the chlor-alkali process. Since then, the titanium based electrode have been widely used in the chlorine, chlorate and hypochlorite industries.
