= Moses Gate =

Coordinates: 53.554°N 2.401°W

- Location within Greater Manchester
- OS grid reference: SD735065
- Metropolitan borough: Bolton
- Metropolitan county: Greater Manchester
- Region: North West
- Country: England
- Sovereign state: United Kingdom
- Post town: BOLTON
- Postcode district: BL3, BL4
- Dialling code: 01204
- Police: Greater Manchester
- Fire: Greater Manchester
- Ambulance: North West
- UK Parliament: Bolton South and Walkden

Moses Gate is a small district of Farnworth, in the Metropolitan Borough of Bolton, Greater Manchester, England. Historically in Lancashire, it lies 2.6 miles (4.2 km) southeast of Bolton town centre and 10.8 miles (17.4 km) northwest of the city of Manchester.

== Toponymy ==
The name Moses Gate is derived from a corruption of mosses meaning peaty or marshy lands and the Old English gata meaning a way, street or road. Together they mean 'the way across the moss'. On Greenwood's 1818 map the place is written Moss Gate. The two words are found in local names, Kearsley Moss, Clifton Moss, Linnyshaw Moss, and in Bolton street names Churchgate and Deansgate - meaning the way to the church or to Deane.

== Moses Gate Country Park ==
The country park, also known as Crompton Lodges, is an attractive 750 acres (3 km^{2}) park, situated in the Croal Irwell Valley between the town centres of Bolton and Farnworth.

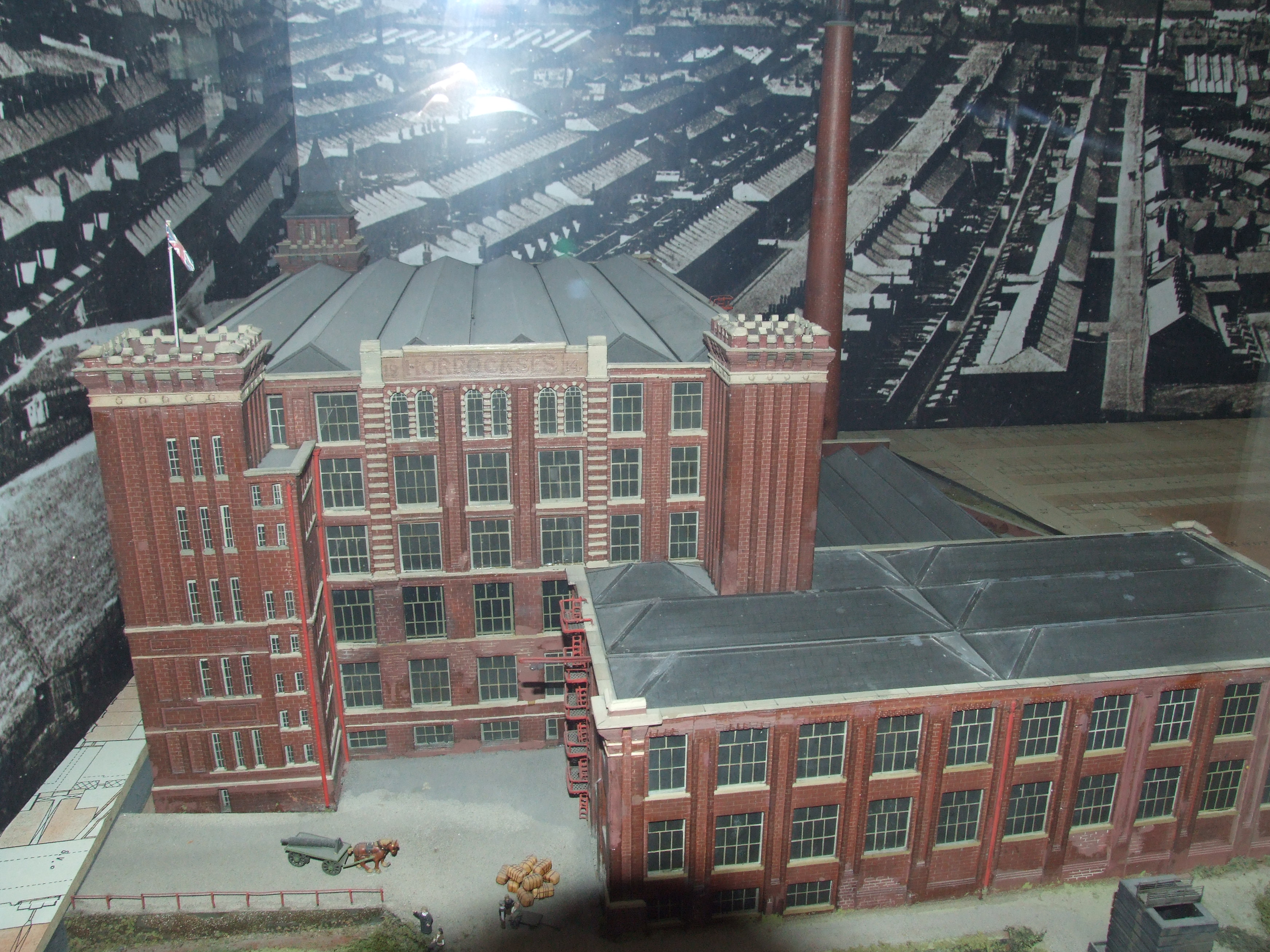
A model of Laund Street spinning mill

In the past it had been an industrial site with chemical works, paper mills and bleach works. After they were closed down, the area fell into ruin and the industrial buildings were finally demolished in 1972. Over the next ten years the area was cleared and Rock Hall was turned from a derelict building into the current visitors' centre.

Today, the park has a diversity of habitats supporting different varieties of fauna and flora. Nob End was designated as a Site of Special Scientific Interest (SSSI) in 1988. The park also offers various activities, which includes walking, cycling, horse riding, model boating, orienteering and model aircraft flying. Permits are available for fishing, canoeing and boating. The Kingfisher Way, a 6.8 miles (10.9 km) marked trail, also runs through the park.

== Transport ==
Moses Gate railway station is served by Northern who operate services on the Manchester to Preston Line, though only local services stop at the station.

There is no Sunday service.

Bee Network buses run through Moses Gate connecting it with Bolton, Manchester and Bury
