= Listed buildings in Little Lever =

Little Lever is a village and an unparished area in the Metropolitan Borough of Bolton, Greater Manchester, England. It contains eight listed buildings that are recorded in the National Heritage List for England. All the listed buildings are designated at Grade II, the lowest of the three grades, which is applied to "buildings of national importance and special interest". The Manchester, Bolton and Bury Canal, now disused, passes through the area, and four milestones and a post adjacent to it are listed. The other listed buildings are a house, originally serving Ladyshore Colliery, a church, and a war memorial plaque.

== Buildings ==
| Name and location | Photograph | Date | Notes |
|---|---|---|---|
| Ladyshore House; 53.55710°N 2.35923°W | — | 1833 | Originally the manager's house, offices and stables for Ladyshore Colliery, later a private house, it is in stone with slate roofs and two storeys. The house has three bays, casement windows, a 20th-century porch, and a doorway with a four-centred arched head, a fanlight and a hood mould. The stable is recessed and has four bays. It has one casement window, the others being mullioned, a doorway with a fanlight, a datestone, and at the rear are lunettes and pitching holes. |
| Milestone approximately 60 metres east of Prestolee Road; 53.55467°N 2.37362°W | — | 1840s | The milestone is on the towpath of the Manchester, Bolton and Bury Canal. It is in stone and consists of a rectangular post inscribed "M/8", indicating the distance in miles from Manchester. |
| Milestone approximately 220 metres southeast of Hall Lane; 53.55956°N 2.38614°W | — | 1840s | The milestone is on the towpath of the Manchester, Bolton and Bury Canal. It is in stone and consists of a rectangular post inscribed "M/8 3/4", indicating the distance in miles from Manchester. |
| Milestone approximately 230 metres north of Prestolee Road; 53.55561°N 2.37789°W | — | 1840s | The milestone is on the towpath of the Manchester, Bolton and Bury Canal. It is in stone and consists of a rectangular post inscribed "M/8 1/4", indicating the distance in miles from Manchester. |
| Milestone approximately 600 metres southeast of Hall Lane; 53.55819°N 2.38113°W | — | 1840s | The milestone is on the towpath of the Manchester, Bolton and Bury Canal. It is in stone and consists of a rectangular post inscribed "M/8 1/2", indicating the distance in miles from Manchester. |
| Post approximately 220 metres southeast of Hall Lane; 53.55978°N 2.38579°W | — | 1840s | The post is on the opposite side of the Manchester, Bolton and Bury Canal from the milepost. It is in stone and consists of a rectangular post inscribed with the initials of the Lancashire and Yorkshire Railway Company. |
| St Matthew's Church; 53.56273°N 2.37346°W | | 1865 | The church was designed by E. G. Paley in early Decorated style, and the tower was raised in height in 1924. It is built in stone with slate roofs, and consists of a nave, north and south transepts, a west porch, a chancel, a north vestry, and a tower at the southeast corner. The tower has four stages, with a stair turret at the southeast, a plain parapet and corner pinnacles. At the west end are large buttresses, a gabled porch, and a rose window. |
| War Memorial Plaque, Little Lever Library; 53.56150°N 2.36927°W | — | 1940 | The plaque on the wall of the library has a rectangular plan, and is in sandstone with a frame and panels in Coniston slate. It consists of a carving in bas-relief depicting a dead soldier wrapped in a shroud, and the frame contains inscriptions and a coat of arms. At the ends of the plaque are panels with the names of those lost in the First World War. Below are two tablets added in 1950 with the names of those lost in the Second World War. |
