= Chlorine production =

Production of chlorine

Chlorine gas can be produced by extracting from natural materials, including the electrolysis of a sodium chloride solution (brine) and other ways.

== Gas extraction ==
Chlorine can be manufactured by the electrolysis of a sodium chloride solution (brine), which is known as the Chloralkali process. The production of chlorine results in the co-products caustic soda (sodium hydroxide, NaOH) and hydrogen gas (H_{2}). These two products, as well as chlorine itself, are highly reactive. Chlorine can also be produced by the electrolysis of a solution of potassium chloride, in which case the co-products are hydrogen and caustic potash (potassium hydroxide). There are three industrial methods for the extraction of chlorine by electrolysis of chloride solutions, all proceeding according to the following equations:

Cathode: 2 H^{+} (aq) + 2 e^{−} → H_{2} (g)
Anode: 2 Cl^{−} (aq) → Cl_{2} (g) + 2 e^{−}

Overall process: 2 NaCl (or KCl) + 2 H_{2}O → Cl_{2} + H_{2} + 2 NaOH (or KOH)

=== Mercury cell electrolysis ===
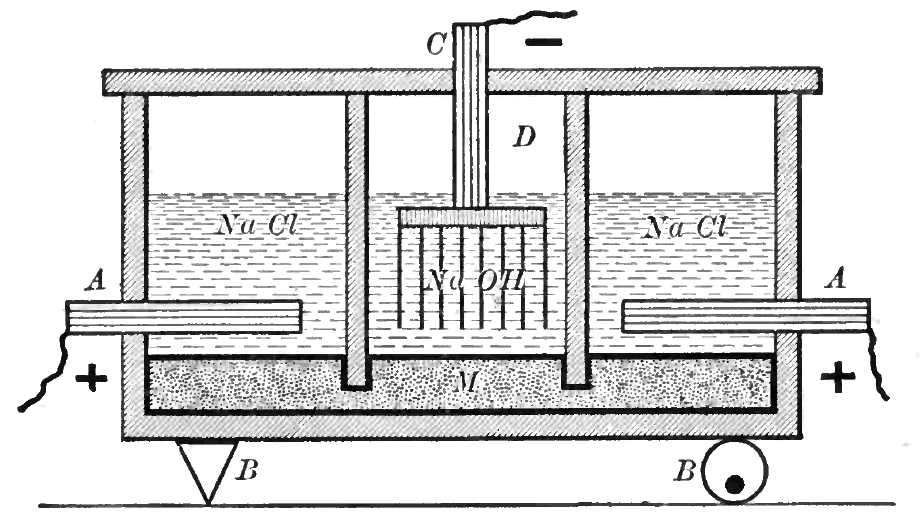
Castner–Kellner cell: Sodium chloride is electrolyzed between the "A" anode and "M" mercury cathode in the side cells, with chlorine bubbling up into the space above the NaCl and the sodium dissolving in the mercury. The sodium–mercury amalgam flows to the center cell, where it reacts with water to produce sodium hydroxide and regenerate the mercury.

Mercury cell electrolysis, also known as the Castner–Kellner process, was the first method used at the end of the nineteenth century to produce chlorine on an industrial scale. The "rocking" cells used have been improved over the years. Today, in the "primary cell", titanium anodes clad with platinum or conductive metal oxides (formerly graphite anodes) are placed in a sodium (or potassium) chloride solution flowing over a liquid mercury cathode. When a potential difference is applied and current flows, chlorine is released at the titanium anode and sodium (or potassium) dissolves in the mercury cathode forming an amalgam. This flows continuously into a separate reactor ("denuder" or "secondary cell"), where it is usually converted back to mercury by reaction with water, producing hydrogen and sodium (or potassium) hydroxide at a commercially useful concentration (50% by weight). The mercury is then recycled to the primary cell by a pump situated at the bottom.

The mercury process is the least energy-efficient of the three main technologies (mercury, diaphragm and membrane) and there are also concerns about mercury emissions.

It is estimated that there are still around 100 mercury-cell plants operating worldwide. In Japan, mercury-based chloralkali production was virtually phased out by 1987 (except for the last two potassium chloride units shut down in 2003). In the United States, there will be only five mercury plants remaining in operation by the end of 2008. In Europe, mercury cells accounted for 43% of capacity in 2006 and Western European producers have committed to closing or converting all remaining chloralkali mercury plants by 2020.

=== Diaphragm cell electrolysis (bipolar) ===
In diaphragm cell electrolysis, an asbestos (or polymer-fiber) diaphragm separates a cathode and an anode, preventing the chlorine forming at the anode from re-mixing with the sodium hydroxide and the hydrogen formed at the cathode. This technology was also developed at the end of the nineteenth century. There are several variants of this process: the Le Sueur cell (1893), the Hargreaves-Bird cell (1901), the Gibbs cell (1908), and the Townsend cell (1904). The cells vary in construction and placement of the diaphragm, with some having the diaphragm in direct contact with the cathode.

The salt solution is continuously fed to the anode compartment and flows through the diaphragm to the cathode compartment, where the caustic alkali is produced and the brine is partially depleted. As a result, diaphragm methods produce alkali that is quite dilute (about 12%) and of lower purity than do mercury cell methods.

Diaphragm cells are not burdened with the problem of preventing mercury discharge into the environment; they also operate at a lower voltage, resulting in an energy savings over the mercury cell method, but large amounts of steam are required if the caustic has to be evaporated to the commercial concentration of 50%.

=== Membrane cell electrolysis ===
Development of this technology began in the 1970s. The electrolysis cell is divided into two "sections" by a cation permeable membrane acting as a cation exchanger. Saturated sodium (or potassium) chloride solution is passed through the anode compartment, leaving at a lower concentration. Sodium (or potassium) hydroxide solution is circulated through the cathode compartment, exiting at a higher concentration. A portion of the concentrated sodium hydroxide solution leaving the cell is diverted as product, while the remainder is diluted with deionized water and passed through the electrolysis apparatus again.

This method is more efficient than the diaphragm cell and produces very pure sodium (or potassium) hydroxide at about 32% concentration, but requires very pure brine.

Membrane cell process for chloralkali production

=== Other electrolytic processes ===
Although a much lower production scale is involved, electrolytic diaphragm and membrane technologies are also used industrially to recover chlorine from hydrochloric acid solutions, producing hydrogen (but no caustic alkali) as a co-product.

Furthermore, electrolysis of fused chloride salts (Downs process) also enables chlorine to be produced, in this case as a by-product of the manufacture of metallic sodium or magnesium.

== Other methods ==
Before electrolytic methods were used for chlorine production, the direct oxidation of hydrogen chloride with oxygen (frequently through exposure to air) was exercised in the Deacon process:

4 HCl + O_{2} → 2 Cl_{2} + 2 H_{2}O

This reaction is accomplished with the use of copper(II) chloride (CuCl_{2}) as a catalyst and is performed at high temperature (about 400 °C). The amount of extracted chlorine is approximately 80%. Due to the extremely corrosive reaction mixture, industrial use of this method is difficult and several pilot trials failed in the past. Nevertheless, recent developments are promising. Recently Sumitomo patented a catalyst for the Deacon process using ruthenium(IV) oxide (RuO_{2}).

Another earlier process to produce chlorine was to heat brine with acid and manganese dioxide.

2 NaCl + 2H_{2}SO_{4} + MnO_{2} → Na_{2}SO_{4} + MnSO_{4} + 2 H_{2}O + Cl_{2}

Using this process, chemist Carl Wilhelm Scheele was the first to isolate chlorine in a laboratory. The manganese can be recovered by the Weldon process.

Small amounts of chlorine gas can be made in the laboratory by putting concentrated hydrochloric acid in a flask with a side arm and rubber tubing attached. Manganese dioxide is then added and the flask stoppered. The reaction is not greatly exothermic. As chlorine is denser than air, it can be easily collected by placing the tube inside a flask where it will displace the air. Once full, the collecting flask can be stoppered.

Another method for producing small amounts of chlorine gas in a lab is by adding concentrated hydrochloric acid (typically about 5M) to sodium hypochlorite or sodium chlorate solution.

Potassium permanganate can be used to generate chlorine gas when concentrated hydrochloric acid is added to it:

2KMnO4 + 16HCl —> 2KCl + 2MnCl2 + 8H2O + 5Cl2

This process has been investigated by Venable & Jackson and fails if the concentration of the hydrochloric acid solution drops below 2mM.

== Membrane industrial production ==
Large-scale production of chlorine involves several steps and many pieces of equipment. The description below is typical of a membrane plant. The plant also simultaneously produces sodium hydroxide (caustic soda) and hydrogen gas. A typical plant consists of brine production/treatment, cell operations, chlorine cooling & drying, chlorine compression & liquefaction, liquid chlorine storage & loading, caustic handling, evaporation, storage & loading and hydrogen handling.

=== Brine ===
Key to the production of chlorine is the operation of the brine saturation/treatment system. Maintaining a properly saturated solution with the correct purity is vital, especially for membrane cells. Many plants have a salt pile which is sprayed with recycled brine. Others have slurry tanks that are fed raw salt and recycled brine. The raw brine is treated with sodium carbonate and sodium hydroxide to precipitate calcium and magnesium. The reactions are often carried out in a series of reactors before the treated brine is sent to a large clarifier where the calcium carbonate and magnesium hydroxide are settled out. A flocculating agent may be added just prior to the clarifier to improve settling. The decanted brine is then mechanically filtered using sand filters or leaf filters before entering a series of ion exchangers to further remove impurities. At several points in this process the brine is tested for hardness and strength.

After the ion exchangers, the brine is considered pure, and is transferred to storage tanks to be pumped into the cell room. The pure brine is heated to the correct temperature to control exit brine temperatures according to the electrical load. Brine exiting the cell room must be treated to remove residual chlorine and control pH levels before being returned to the saturation stage. This can be accomplished via dechlorination towers with acid and sodium bisulfite addition. Failure to remove chlorine can result in damage to the ion exchange units. Brine should be monitored for accumulation of both chlorate anions and sulfate anions, and either have a treatment system in place, or purging of the brine loop to maintain safe levels, since chlorate anions can diffuse through the membranes and contaminate the caustic, while sulfate anions can damage the anode surface coating.

=== Cell room ===
The building that houses the many electrolytic cells is usually called a cell room or cell house, although some plants are built outdoors. This building contains support structures for the cells, connections for supplying electrical power to the cells and piping for the fluids. Monitoring and control of the temperatures of the feed caustic and brine is done to control exit temperatures. Also monitored are the voltages of each cell which vary with the electrical load on the cell room that is used to control the rate of production. Monitoring and control of the pressures in the chlorine and hydrogen headers is also done via pressure control valves.

Direct current is supplied via a rectified power source. Plant load is controlled by varying the current to the cells. As the current is increased, flow rates for brine and caustic and deionized water are increased, while lowering the feed temperatures.

=== Cooling and drying ===
Chlorine gas exiting the cell line must be cooled and dried since the exit gas can be over 80°C and contains moisture that allows chlorine gas to be corrosive to iron piping. Cooling the gas allows for a large amount of moisture from the brine to condense out of the gas stream. Cooling also improves the efficiency of both the compression and the liquefaction stage that follows. Chlorine exiting is ideally between 18°C and 25°C. After cooling the gas stream passes through a series of towers with counter flowing sulfuric acid. These towers progressively remove any remaining moisture from the chlorine gas. After exiting the drying towers the chlorine is filtered to remove any remaining sulfuric acid.

=== Compression and liquefaction ===
Several methods of compression may be used: liquid ring, reciprocating, or centrifugal. The chlorine gas is compressed at this stage and may be further cooled by inter- and after-coolers. After compression it flows to the liquefiers, where it is cooled enough to liquefy. Non condensible gases and remaining chlorine gas are vented off as part of the pressure control of the liquefaction systems. These gases are routed to a gas scrubber, producing sodium hypochlorite, or used in the production of hydrochloric acid (by combustion with hydrogen) or ethylene dichloride (by reaction with ethylene).

=== Storage and loading ===
Liquid chlorine is typically gravity-fed to storage tanks. It can be loaded into rail or road tankers via pumps or padded with compressed dry gas.

=== Caustic handling, evaporation, storage and loading ===
Caustic, fed to the cell room flows in a loop that is simultaneously bled off to storage with a part diluted with deionized water and returned to the cell line for strengthening within the cells. The caustic exiting the cell line must be monitored for strength, to maintain safe concentrations. Too strong or too weak a solution may damage the membranes. Membrane cells typically produce caustic in the range of 30% to 33% by weight. The feed caustic flow is heated at low electrical loads to control its exit temperature. Higher loads require the caustic to be cooled, to maintain correct exit temperatures. The caustic exiting to storage is pulled from a storage tank and may be diluted for sale to customers who require weak caustic or for use on site. Another stream may be pumped into a multiple effect evaporator set to produce commercial 50% caustic. Rail cars and tanker trucks are loaded at loading stations via pumps.

=== Hydrogen handling ===
Hydrogen produced as a byproduct may be vented unprocessed directly to the atmosphere or cooled, compressed and dried for use in other processes on site or sold to a customer via pipeline, cylinders or trucks. Some possible uses include the manufacture of hydrochloric acid or hydrogen peroxide, as well as desulfurization of petroleum, or use as a fuel in boilers or fuel cells.

=== Energy consumption ===
Production of chlorine is extremely energy intensive. Energy consumption per unit weight of product is not far below that for iron and steel manufacture and greater than for the production of glass or cement.

Since electricity is an indispensable raw material for the production of chlorine, the energy consumption corresponding to the electrochemical reaction cannot be reduced. Energy savings arise primarily through applying more efficient technologies and reducing ancillary energy use. Greenhouse gas emissions of the overall process thus depend largely on the way the electricity is produced. If hydropower, nuclear power or other low carbon sources are used, emissions will be much lower than if fossil fuels are used.
