= Ladyshore Colliery =

Mine in Lancashire

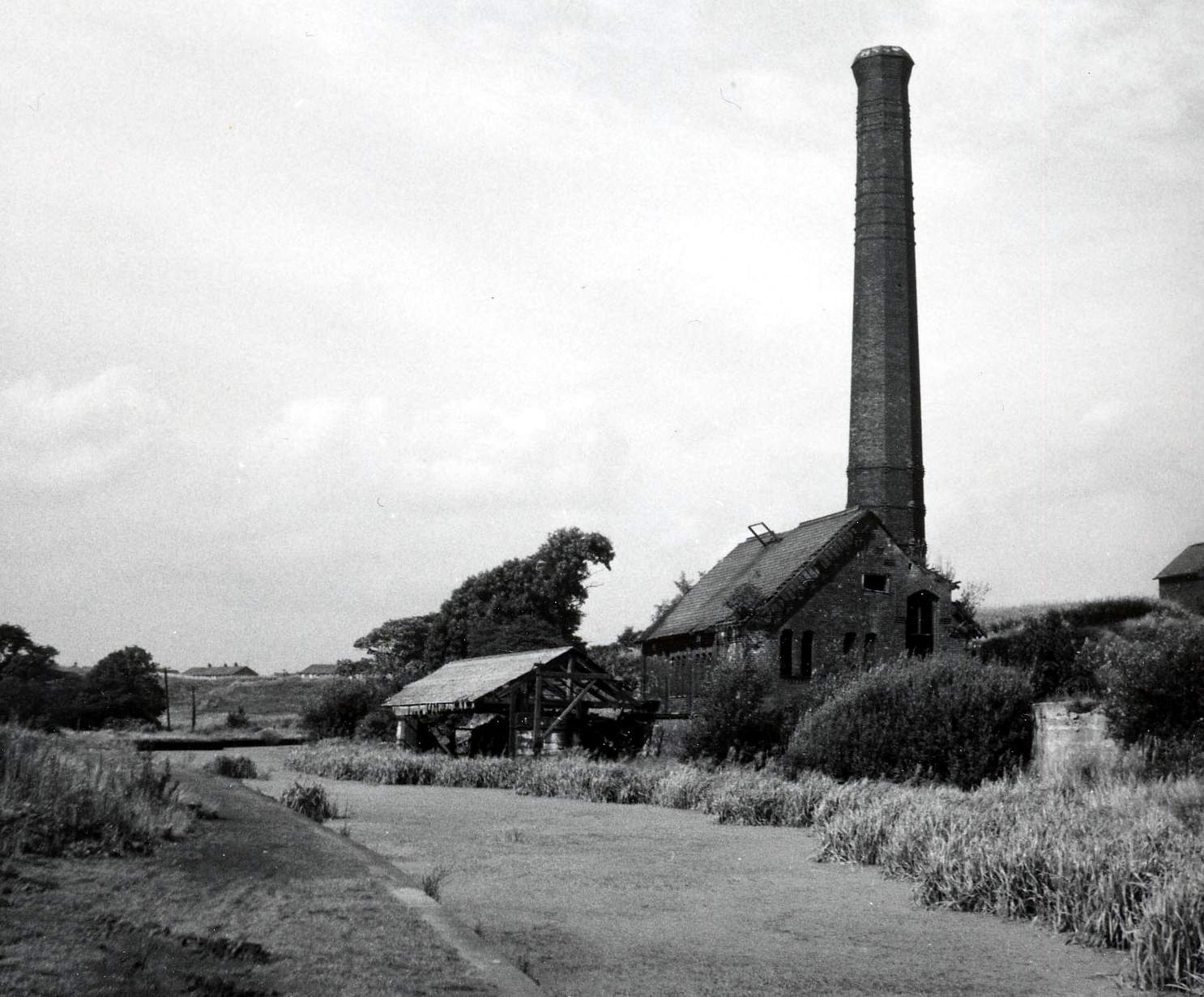
- Ladyshore Colliery in 1968, with the canal in the foreground

- Location of the mine in England
- Location: 53°33′22″N 2°21′33″W
- Opened: 1830s
- Closed: 1949

Ladyshore Colliery, originally named Back o' th Barn, was situated on the Irwell Valley fault on the Manchester Coalfield in Little Lever, then in the historic county of Lancashire, England. Founded by Thomas Fletcher Senior, the colliery opened in the 1830s and mined several types of coal. It became infamous as a result of the owners' stand against the use of safety lamps in the mines. Women and children worked in the mines, under poor conditions.

Closed in 1949, it was the last colliery to remain in use by the canal. Only the colliery office (now a house) and the stables have survived.

== Terminology used ==
Coal mining had its own terminology, whilst some terms were common in all areas, some were used only in the Lancashire Coalfield. Following are some terms used in Ladyshore Colliery, taken from Weep Mother Weep.

- Balance – a slope with a pulley at the top where empty tubs pulled full tubs up the slope
- Balancer – the person, usually a boy, who operated the balance
- Colliery – the site at the surface that includes all the buildings, railways and headgears
- Coupler – a boy who worked on the haulage system coupling tubs together
- Mine – the name given in Lancashire to a coal seam
- Pit – the shaft from the surface down to the workings
- Tenter – a person who looked after something e.g., furnace tenter, door tenter or pony tenter

== History ==
Ladyshore Colliery was situated in the Irwell Valley, on two sides of the Manchester, Bolton and Bury Canal. The colliery was opened in the 1830s and originally had three pits, Ladyshore, Victoria and Owl Hole. The deepest was Owl Hole, which reached 55 fathoms (101 m).

The geology of the Irwell Valley made coal easier to mine; thrown upwards by the fault, the coal measures were often to be found at reasonably shallow depths. Unfortunately floods were common as water seeped into the pits. In 1835, one such flood occurred at Ladyshore. Mining in the affected pit ceased in 1884, but the shaft remained in use as the upcast ventilation shaft for the colliery. Eventually a tunnel was driven to Farnworth Bridge Pit, also owned by the Fletcher family, to dewater and ventilate the mines.

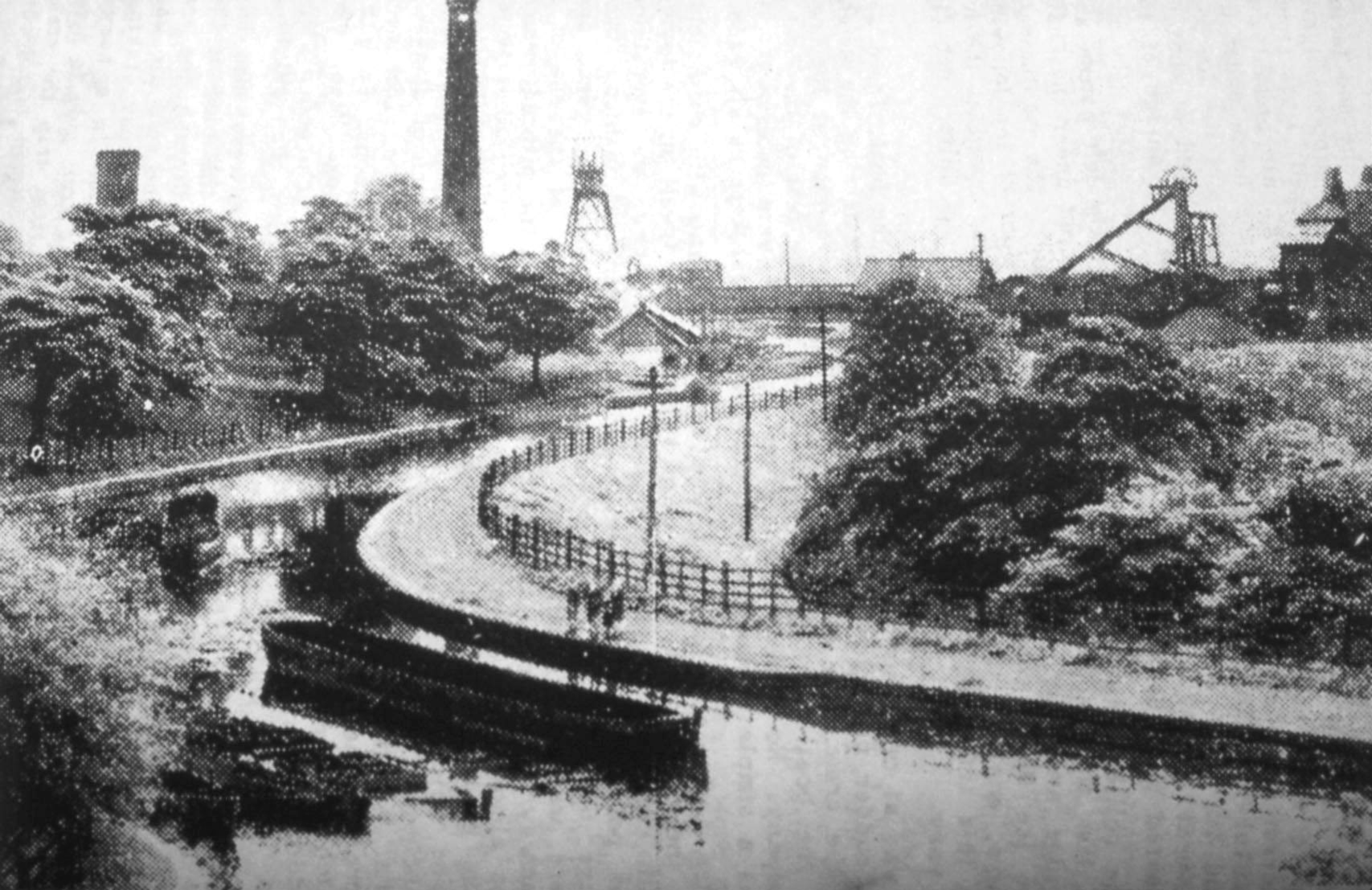
Ladyshore Colliery in about 1948

At various stages, the owners connected the two sides of the colliery. Around 1850 a bridge was built over the canal (bridge number 67) and some time around 1881, the bridge was railed to make a tubway. In 1905 the owners entered into discussion with the Lancashire and Yorkshire Railway Company in an attempt to establish an endless steel ropeway across the canal, and to deliver coal using a possible rail spur to the colliery. Although these talks were abandoned, in 1908 the subject was again raised, again with no result.

In 1938 the colliery was owned by Ladyshore Coal Company (1930). Its three pits, Ladyshore, Owl Hole and Victoria employed 208 men underground and 114 surface workers. By the start of World War II Ladyshore was the only working colliery remaining on the entire length of the canal. It had its own fleet of boats and as late as 1941 still sent over 50,000 metric tons (49,000 long tons) of coal along the canal to Radcliffe and Bury. In 1907, the colliery was reorganised and a new company formed to run it, the Ladyshore Coal Company Ltd. In 1930 a management re-shuffle lead to the company changing hands and it was renamed the Ladyshore Coal Co. (1930) Ltd. The colliery was one of the few in the area to use pit ponies, and in 1948 concerns were raised over their treatment. Animal welfare groups managed to obtain photographs and were preparing to oppose the mine owners when in June 1949, the colliery closed and the ponies brought from the mine for the last time.

Today, only the colliery office (now a house) and the stables survive. At the close, the last full year output was given as 39,541 tons with a manpower of 236.

== Mines ==
There were several mines or coal seams worked at Ladyshore: The Owl Hole Pit worked the Trencherbone, Top Yard, Doe and Three Yard whilst the Victoria Pit worked the Cannel, Five Quarters, Gingham and Ten Foot.

== Accidents ==
The colliery was witness to several accidents, some of them fatal. In 1886, a collier by the name of Hardaker was injured in or around the coal screening area. The accident resulted in Hardaker taking Fletcher, the owner to court. Although some private papers about the subsequent court case, Hardakers v Fletcher, have survived, none of the paperwork is dated other than by the year. At 2:30 pm on 25 June 1902, a collier by the name of W. Scott was killed. Scott was pulling down the roof with his under-manager, a man by the name of Brown when a 6-inch-thick (150 mm) layer fell, bringing down the next layer and crushing Scott. At the inquest in Bolton on 1 July, his death was recorded as accidental.

On 12 April 1940, an underground tram accident occurred at the colliery, crushing and seriously injuring a miner named as E. Robinson.

== Fletcher family ==
The fortunes of the Ladyshore were intimately connected with the Fletcher family and their ties to local politics. The colliery was founded by Thomas Fletcher Senior, under the name Thomas Fletcher & Sons. Thomas Sr (1805–1893) was chairman of the Little Lever Local Board (effectively the town council) from 1872 until 1879. He had a brother John who, whilst part of the colliery business, kept in the shadows. On the death of Thomas Sr, Thomas Junior took over the mines with his brother Matthew. Thomas Jr became the Mayor of Bolton in 1884 and remained in office until 1887. Thomas' brother Matthew kept out of direct control of the colliery but maintained the family links to politics by becoming the chairman of the Little Lever Local Board (1893–1894) and then chairman of the Little Lever Urban District Council in 1895. Thomas Sr died in 1893, leaving £163,000, equivalent to £18,109,360 in 2025. The activities of Thomas Sr and Thomas Jr meant that they could not devote all their time to the colliery, so John's son Herbert Fletcher (1842–1895), also a member of Bolton Town Council, took control of the colliery and was named as the owner in the infamous court case over safety lamps. Herbert died of a heart attack at the colliery on 16 September 1895. Despite owning a coal mine, Herbert was active in the area of preventing smoke pollution and published several papers on smoke control, his most read being in the Journal of the Royal Society for the Promotion of Health.

== Fletcher trial ==
Despite an accident caused by a candle igniting gas at the Clifton Hall Colliery on 18 June 1885, in which 178 miners lost their lives, the Fletcher family, owners of Ladyshore refused to introduce safety lamps into the pits even though they were working the same mine (coal seam) which was known to be a gassy coal. This stubborn streak resulted in one of the largest court cases involving coal mines in England which brought about the end of the use of candles and other open lights in coal mines. The case also had implications for the use of other equipment, such as electrical lighting and tools, which may have endangered the lives of miners.

On 3 May 1886, HM Inspector of Mines, Mr Joseph Dickenson, inspected the pits and, on finding that candles were still being used, cited the Gingham mine and issued a notice to Herbert Fletcher stating that all the pits must change to safety lamps. The notice read:

"Coal Mines Regulation Act 1872 s46. Whereas at the above named mine (of the Ladyshore Colliery) I find the following matter which is not provided against by any express provision of the above Act or by any special rule established thereunder – namely, that the respective mines in the colliery are worked with open lights, and not safety lamps, notwithstanding that such mines are subject to emissions of firedamp. And whereas I am of opinion that, having regard to the character of the mines, the said matter is dangerous or defective so as to threaten or tend to the bodily injury of the persons employed in and about the said colliery. Now I hereby give you notice forthwith to remedy the said matter."

On 21 May, Herbert Fletcher appealed against the notice to the Home Secretary. The Home Secretary deferred the matter and both he and the mine owners each appointed an arbitrator, who then appointed an umpire to decide the points. After an examination of the facts, the umpire agreed with the notice.

Fletcher hired C. A. Russell, Solicitor and Henn Collins QC (later Baron Collins) to appeal this decision to the Divisional Court at Wigan. The reasoning behind the appeal was twofold: first; that the umpire was limited to deeming whether an open light was dangerous and not determining that mines need to be worked with a particular remedy as this went beyond his powers and second; that instead of using safety lamps, the owners could get rid of the firedamp, thus not requiring safety lamps as laid down in the notice.

On 12 July 1886 at Wigan, Denman & Hawkins JJ dismissed the appeal upholding the umpire's decision and the Inspector's original notice. Fletcher then appealed to the High Courts and the case was heard by the Queen's Bench on 16 December 1886. The Queen's Bench upheld the Divisional Court decision, but gave leave to appeal to the House of Lords.

The matter was taken to the Court of Appeal at the House of Lords where on 15 January 1887, under a bench consisting of Lords of Appeal in Ordinary (commonly known as Law Lords) Esher MR, Bowen LJ and Fry LJ. the appeal was heard. The appeal involved several arguments, on how the umpire had arrived at his decision, the points that he had used and whether he (the umpire) had exceeded his authority. On 17 January, after deliberation, a two (Esher & Fry) to one (Bowen) judgment was issued, upholding the Queen's Bench and dismissing the appeal:

"The question here is whether the use of open lights is or is not safe. The general or special rules cannot affect this question, though they may apply when it is determined. Further, the umpire has not exceeded his powers by stating that the only alternative to open lamps, namely safety lamps, shall be adopted. At all events he has determined the question that the working of the mine with open lamps is dangerous, and his award ought not to be set aside, even if it goes in other respects beyond the scope of his authority. I [Esher] can see no reason therefore, why the award should not go back to him so that it may be put into form. When that is done, it will be for the mine owner to remedy the defect, for if he does not he will be, if the next tribunal [the criminal trial that could result from this verdict] is against him, be liable to the penalties under the Act."

Despite the dismissal of the appeal and thus the validation of the notice issued by HM Inspector of Mines, Fletcher continued to use open flames. Because of this, on 4 May 1887, Herbert Fletcher was summoned to Bolton Police Court to answer charges of 'a breach of safety' under the Coal Mines Regulation Act 1872. On 16 May 1887, Fletcher was found guilty of endangering his workers and fined at the Bolton Court.

This case marked the end of the use of candles and other open lights in English coal mines and left Ladyshore with the infamous distinction of being the last colliery to use open lights.

== Trade union disputes ==
In 1893, the Miners' Federation of Great Britain found itself involved in a struggle against mine owners who wanted a 25% cut in miners pay. The action resulted in widespread lockouts and involved 300,000 miners. The mine owners were eventually forced to give in and restore the wage cuts. All the pits in Little Lever were affected for the full 15 weeks that the action lasted and the Fletcher family were amongst the owners who most strongly supported the cut in wages.

== Women and children in the mine ==
In 1841 amidst concerns over child labour, the government commissioned a report into the state of collieries. This report, "The Royal Commission Report", was carried out by John J. Kennedy and published in 1842.

In collecting his testimony, Kennedy realised that women were being treated as badly as children and widened his scope to include them as well. Kennedy visited the area of Little Lever and interviewed several women and children working in the pits. The women lived in Outwood and were employed by Thomas Fletcher. Fletcher owned both Ladyshore and Outwood Collieries and the women moved from one pit to another depending on how much coal was being produced. Their testimonies showed that children as young as 5 or 6 were working in the pits. Married and mothers, Betty Wardle and Mary Hardman gave damning testimony to conditions underground. Wardle told Kennedy she started work at the age of 6 whilst Hardman said she started at the age of 7. Wardle later described how she was employed to 'draw with belt and chain'; that is pull the tubs along the underground rails by means of a leather waist belt to the back of which was attached a chain to the tub, used where the tunnels were too small for the use of ponies, (ponies were not used at Outwood, so this must refer to Ladyshore). She then went on to tell Kennedy that she was forced to work whilst pregnant and that she had one child of her four in the mine, the work had brought on labour and the newborn was carried out of the mine in her skirt.

The youngest children were employed as ventilation tenters. Ventilation in the mines was controlled by a series of wooden doors across the passages, these children would sit in a niche dug out of the wall, opening and closing these doors to allow miners and tubs to pass. It was common for them to sit in the dark for up to 8 hours a day. Other young children were employed as pony tenters, they would feed and water the pit ponies in the underground stables.

Older children were given more manual jobs. Tubs were pulled up slopes above and below ground by balance weights, a balancer was usually a boy who operated the balance system. Alongside him worked a coupler, whose job it was to couple the tubs together before they were pulled up the slope. These were dangerous jobs and many children were seriously injured or lost limbs.

The government had not realised that the position for women was as bad as that of the children and was so shocked by the report that legislation was passed almost immediately, The Mines and Collieries Act 1842, which made it illegal for mine owners to employ women or children under the age of 10 years, underground.

While women and the youngest children were stopped from going into the mines and various education acts raised the school leaving age, boys still followed their fathers' footsteps into the mines as late as the Second World War. Sid Dyer left school at 14 and started to work at Ladyshore, sorting coal from the dirt. One year later aged 15, Dyer went to work underground.

== Manchester, Bolton and Bury Canal ==
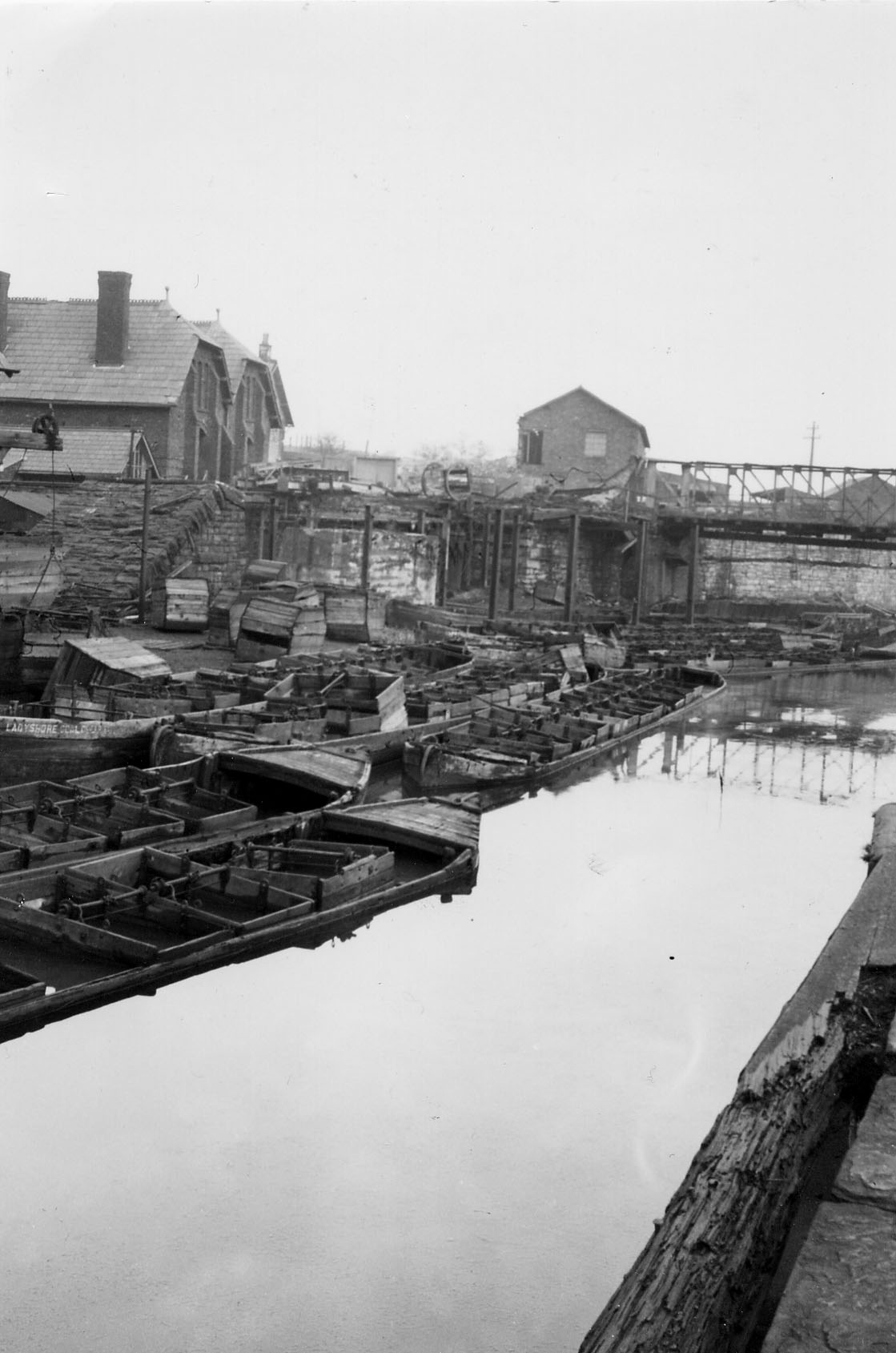
Coal barges line the edge of the canal, ready for use

The colliery had a very close association with the canal as it was the means by which the colliery transported its coal to Bury, Radcliffe, Manchester and Salford. As the colliery developed, it started to build its own canal boats. The canal boats used by the colliery were horse-drawn, former collier Sid Dyer described his role and how he worked the horse-drawn boats when he started working at the colliery in 1938. The colliery had its own boat-building yard situated on the canal near Nob End. The boat builders were skilled tradesmen and usually passed the trade down from father to son. Alec Waterson who was the last of five generations of Ladyshore canal boat builders described the building process in his book. Following the breach of the canal at Nob End in 1936, the arm to Bury was kept open to transport coal, until the colliery closed.

== See also ==
List of mining disasters in Lancashire
