= Ruthenium(IV) oxide (data page) =

Chemical data page

This page provides supplementary chemical data on ruthenium(IV) oxide.

== Thermodynamic properties ==
Phase behavior
Triple point	? K (? °C), ? Pa
Critical point	? K (? °C), ? Pa
Std enthalpy change of fusionΔ_{fus}H^{~~o~~}	? kJ/mol
Std entropy change of fusionΔ_{fus}S^{~~o~~}	? J/(mol·K)
Std enthalpy change of vaporizationΔ_{vap}H^{~~o~~}	? kJ/mol
Std entropy change of vaporizationΔ_{vap}S^{~~o~~}	? J/(mol·K)
Solid properties
Std enthalpy change of formation Δ_{f}H^{~~o~~}_{solid}	-71 kcal/mol
Std enthalpy change of absorption -Δ_{a}H^{~~o~~}_{solid}	200 kJ/mol
Standard molar entropy S^{~~o~~}_{solid}	? J/(mol K)
Heat capacity c_{p}	? J/(mol K)
Liquid properties
Std enthalpy change of formation Δ_{f}H^{~~o~~}_{liquid}	? kJ/mol
Standard molar entropy S^{~~o~~}_{liquid}	? J/(mol K)
Heat capacity c_{p}	? J/(mol K)
Gas properties
Std enthalpy change of formation Δ_{f}H^{~~o~~}_{gas}	? kJ/mol
Standard molar entropy S^{~~o~~}_{gas}	? J/(mol K)
Heat capacity c_{p}	? J/(mol K)

== Spectral data ==
UV-Vis
Lambda-max	? nm
Extinction coefficient	?
IR
Major absorption bands	? cm^{−1}
NMR
Proton NMR
Carbon-13 NMR
Other NMR data
MS
Masses of main fragments

== Structure and properties data ==
Structure and properties
Index of refraction	?
Dielectric constant	? C^{2}/(N·m^{2}) at ? °C
Bond strength	?
Bond length	?
Bond angle	?
Magnetic susceptibility	?

== Material Safety Data Sheet ==
The handling of this chemical may require notable safety precautions. Safety information can be found on the Material Safety Datasheet (MSDS) for this chemical or from a reliable source, such as SIRI.

This box:
- Except where noted otherwise, data relate to Standard temperature and pressure.
- Reliability of data general note.
