= World Chlorine Council =

- Headquarters: Brussels, Belgium
- Website: worldchlorine.org

The World Chlorine Council (WCC) is an international network of national and regional trade associations representing the chlorine and chlorinated products industries in more than 27 countries. Members include chloralkali process associations such as Euro Chlor, Japan Soda Industry Association, Alkali Manufacturers' Association of India, and RusChlor (Russian Federation). Members from the product sector include five vinyl producer associations, and the Halogenated Solvents Industry Alliance (United States).
