= Euro Chlor =

Euro Chlor is the association of chloralkali plant operators in Europe, its members representing 97% of European chlorine and sodium hydroxide production capacity. Its main activities are collaboration with respect to production methods, safety and environmental protection. Euro Chlor is a sector group of European Chemical Industry Council (Cefic) and a member of World Chlorine Council.

As of 2023, Euro Chlor represents 38 producers, operating 62 manufacturing locations in 19 European countries.

== History ==
Euro Chlor was established in 1989. The immediate motivation for its creation was an anti-chlorine campaign led by Greenpeace, which was seen as threatening the industry. The campaigners were seeking to ban specific uses of chlorine (like for the manufacture of PVC or paper production) or the chlorine industry as a whole, citing health and environmental hazards of chlorine and chlorine compounds. Euro Chlor was meant to provide counterbalance viewpoint to government regulators and the public.

In 1991 the European Chlorine Derivatives Council (ECDC), European Chlorinated Solvents Association (ECSA) and Chlorinated Paraffins Sector Group merged with Euro Chlor, creating the Euro Chlor Federation.

Euro Chlor's direct predecessor with respect to technical activities was Bureau International du Chlore (BITC), established in 1953. Its activities were focused on gathering industry statistics and collaboration with respect to manufacturing technology, workplace safety and environmental protection. In 1972 BITC established the Working Group on Production, Storage and Transport safety (GEST), which publishes technical recommendations.
