= Leblanc process =

Former industrial process for producing sodium carbonate from salt

- Process type: Chemical
- Industrial sector(s): Chlor-alkali industry
- Feedstock: sodium chloride, sulfuric acid, coal, calcium carbonate
- Product(s): soda ash, hydrochloric acid, calcium sulfide, carbon dioxide
- Inventor: Nicolas Leblanc
- Year of invention: 1791
- Developer(s): William Losh, James Muspratt, Charles Tennant

The Leblanc process was an early industrial process for making soda ash (sodium carbonate) used throughout the 19th century, named after its inventor, Nicolas Leblanc. It involved two stages: making sodium sulfate from sodium chloride, followed by reacting the sodium sulfate with coal and calcium carbonate to make sodium carbonate. The process gradually became obsolete after the development of the Solvay process.

== Background ==
Soda ash (sodium carbonate) and potash (potassium carbonate), collectively termed alkali, are vital chemicals in the glass, textile, soap, and paper industries. The traditional source of alkali in western Europe had been potash obtained from wood ashes. However, by the 13th century, deforestation had rendered this means of production uneconomical, and alkali had to be imported. Potash was imported from North America, Scandinavia, and Russia, where large forests still stood. Soda ash was imported from Spain and the Canary Islands, where it was produced from the ashes of glasswort plants (called barilla ashes in Spain), or imported from Syria. The soda ash from glasswort plant ashes was mainly a mixture of sodium carbonate and potassium carbonate. In addition in Egypt, naturally occurring sodium carbonate, the mineral natron, was mined from dry lakebeds. In Britain, the only local source of alkali was from kelp, which washed ashore in Scotland and Ireland.

In 1783, King Louis XVI and the French Academy of Sciences offered a prize of 2400 livres for a method to produce alkali from sea salt (sodium chloride). In 1791, Nicolas Leblanc, physician to Louis Philip II, Duke of Orléans, patented a solution. That same year he built the first Leblanc plant for the Duke at Saint-Denis, and this began to produce 320 tons of soda per year. He was denied his prize money because of the French Revolution.

For more recent history, see industrial history below.

== Chemistry ==
Reaction scheme of the Leblanc process (green = reactants, black = intermediates, red = products)

In the first step, sodium chloride is treated with sulfuric acid in the Mannheim process. This reaction produces sodium sulfate (called the salt cake) and hydrogen chloride:

2 NaCl + H_{2}SO_{4} → Na_{2}SO_{4} + 2 HCl

This chemical reaction had been discovered in 1772 by the Swedish chemist Carl Wilhelm Scheele. Leblanc's contribution was the second step, in which a mixture of the salt cake and crushed limestone (calcium carbonate) was reduced by heating with coal. This conversion entails two parts. First is the carbothermic reaction whereby the coal, a source of carbon, reduces the sulfate to sulfide:

Na_{2}SO_{4} + 2 C → Na_{2}S + 2 CO_{2}

The second stage is the reaction to produce sodium carbonate and calcium sulfide. This mixture is called black ash.

Na_{2}S + CaCO_{3} → Na_{2}CO_{3} + CaS

The soda ash is extracted from the black ash with water. Evaporation of this extract yields solid sodium carbonate. This extraction process was termed lixiviation.

In response to the Alkali Act, the noxious calcium sulfide was converted into calcium carbonate:

CaS(s) + CO_{2}(g) + H_{2}O(l) → CaCO_{3}(s) + H_{2}S(g)

The hydrogen sulfide can be used as a sulfur source for the lead chamber process to produce the sulfuric acid used in the first step of the Leblanc process.

Likewise, by 1874 the Deacon process was invented, oxidizing the hydrochloric acid over a copper catalyst:

4 HCl(g) + O_{2}(g) → H_{2}O(g) + Cl_{2}(g)

The chlorine would be sold for bleach in paper and textile manufacturing. Eventually, the chlorine sales became the purpose of the Leblanc process. The inexpensive chlorine was a contributor to the development of the chloralkali process.

== Process detail ==
The sodium chloride is initially mixed with concentrated sulfuric acid and the mixture exposed to low heat. The hydrogen chloride gas bubbles off and was discarded to atmosphere before gas absorption towers were introduced. This continues until all that is left is a fused mass. This mass still contains enough chloride to contaminate the later stages of the process. The mass is then exposed to direct flame, which evaporates nearly all of the remaining chloride.

The coal used in the next step must be low in nitrogen to avoid the formation of cyanide. The calcium carbonate, in the form of limestone or chalk, should be low in magnesia and silica. The weight ratio of the charge is 2:2:1 of salt cake, calcium carbonate, and carbon respectively. It is fired in a reverberatory furnace at about 1000 °C. Sometimes the reverberatory furnace rotated and thus was called a "revolver".

The black-ash product of firing must be lixiviated right away to prevent oxidation of sulfides back to sulfate. In the lixiviation process, the black-ash is completely covered in water, again to prevent oxidation. To optimize the leaching of soluble material, the lixiviation is done in cascaded stages. That is, pure water is used on the black-ash that has already been through prior stages. The liquor from that stage is used to leach an earlier stage of the black-ash, and so on.

The final liquor is treated by blowing carbon dioxide through it. This precipitates dissolved calcium and other impurities. It also volatilizes the sulfide, which is carried off as H_{2}S gas. Any residual sulfide can be subsequently precipitated by adding zinc hydroxide. The liquor is separated from the precipitate and evaporated using waste heat from the reverberatory furnace. The resulting ash is then redissolved into concentrated solution in hot water. Solids that fail to dissolve are separated. The solution is then cooled to recrystallize nearly pure sodium carbonate decahydrate.

== Industrial history ==
Leblanc established the first Leblanc process plant in 1791 in St. Denis. However, French Revolutionaries seized the plant, along with the rest of Louis Philip's estate, in 1794, and publicized Leblanc's trade secrets. Napoleon I returned the plant to Leblanc in 1801, but lacking the funds to repair it and compete against other soda works that had been established in the meantime, Leblanc committed suicide in 1806.

By the early 19th century, French soda ash producers were making 10,000 - 15,000 tons annually. However, it was in Britain that the Leblanc process became most widely practiced. The first British soda works using the Leblanc process was built by the Losh family of iron founders at the Losh, Wilson and Bell works in Walker on the River Tyne in 1816, but steep British tariffs on salt production hindered the economics of the Leblanc process and kept such operations on a small scale until 1824. Following the repeal of the salt tariff, the British soda industry grew dramatically. The Bonnington Chemical Works was possibly the earliest production, and the chemical works established by James Muspratt in Liverpool and Flint, and by Charles Tennant near Glasgow became some of the largest in the world. Muspratt's Liverpool works enjoyed proximity and transport links to the Cheshire salt mines, the St Helens coalfields and the North Wales and Derbyshire limestone quarries. By 1852, annual soda production had reached 140,000 tons in Britain and 45,000 tons in France. By the 1870s, the British soda output of 200,000 tons annually exceeded that of all other nations in the world combined.

=== Obsolescence ===
In 1861, the Belgian chemist Ernest Solvay developed a more direct process for producing soda ash from salt and limestone through the use of ammonia. The only waste product of this Solvay process was calcium chloride, and so it was both more economical and less polluting than the Leblanc method. From the late 1870s, Solvay-based soda works on the European continent provided stiff competition in their home markets to the Leblanc-based British soda industry. Additionally the Brunner Mond Solvay plant which opened in 1874 at Winnington near Northwich provided fierce competition nationally. Leblanc producers were unable to compete with Solvay soda ash, and their soda ash production was effectively an adjunct to their still profitable production of chlorine, bleaching powder etc. (The unwanted by-products had become the profitable products). The development of electrolytic methods of chlorine production removed that source of profits as well, and there followed a decline moderated only by "gentlemen's' agreements" with Solvay producers. By 1900, 90% of the world's soda production was through the Solvay method, or on the North American continent, through the mining of trona, discovered in 1938, which caused the closure of the last North American Solvay plant in 1986.

The last Leblanc-based soda ash plant in the West closed in the early 1920s, but when during WWII Nationalist China had to evacuate its industry to the inland rural areas, the difficulties in importing and maintaining complex equipment forced them to temporarily re-establish the Leblanc process.

However, the Solvay process does not work for the manufacture of potassium carbonate, because it relies on the low solubility of the corresponding bicarbonate.

== Pollution issues ==
The Leblanc process plants were quite damaging to the local environment. The process of generating salt cake from salt and sulfuric acid released hydrochloric acid gas, and because this acid was industrially useless in the early 19th century, it was simply vented into the atmosphere. Also, an insoluble smelly solid waste was produced. For every 8 tons of soda ash, the process produced 5.5 tons of hydrogen chloride and 7 tons of calcium sulfide waste. This solid waste (known as galligu) had no economic value, and was piled in heaps and spread on fields near the soda works, where it weathered to release hydrogen sulfide, the toxic gas responsible for the odor of rotten eggs.

Because of their noxious emissions, Leblanc soda works became targets of lawsuits and legislation. An 1839 suit against soda works alleged, "the gas from these manufactories is of such a deleterious nature as to blight everything within its influence, and is alike baneful to health and property. The herbage of the fields in their vicinity is scorched, the gardens neither yield fruit nor vegetables; many flourishing trees have lately become rotten naked sticks. Cattle and poultry droop and pine away. It tarnishes the furniture in our houses, and when we are exposed to it, which is of frequent occurrence, we are afflicted with coughs and pains in the head ... all of which we attribute to the Alkali works."

In 1863, the British Parliament passed the Alkali Act 1863, the first of several Alkali Acts, the first modern air pollution legislation. This act allowed that no more than 5% of the hydrochloric acid produced by alkali plants could be vented to the atmosphere. To comply with the legislation, soda works passed the escaping hydrogen chloride gas up through a tower packed with charcoal, where it was absorbed by water flowing in the other direction. The chemical works usually dumped the resulting hydrochloric acid solution into nearby bodies of water, killing fish and other aquatic life.

The Leblanc process also meant very unpleasant working conditions for the operators. It originally required careful operation and frequent operator interventions (some involving heavy manual labour) into processes giving off hot noxious chemicals. Sometimes, workmen cleaning the reaction products out of the reverberatory furnace wore cloth mouth-and-nose gags to keep dust and aerosols out of the lungs.

This improved somewhat later as processes were more heavily mechanised to improve economics and uniformity of product.

By the 1880s, methods for converting the hydrochloric acid to chlorine gas for the manufacture of bleaching powder and for reclaiming the sulfur in the calcium sulfide waste had been discovered, but the Leblanc process remained more wasteful and more polluting than the Solvay process. The same is true when it is compared with the later electrolytical processes which eventually replaced it for chlorine production.

== Biodiversity ==
There is a strong case for arguing that Leblanc process waste is the most endangered habitat in the UK, since the waste weathers down to calcium carbonate and produces a haven for plants that thrive in lime-rich soils, known as calcicoles. Only four such sites have survived the new millennium; three are protected as local nature reserves of which the largest, at Nob End near Bolton, is an SSSI and Local Nature Reserve - largely for its sparse orchid-calcicole flora, most unusual in an area with acid soils. This alkaline island contains within it an acid island, where acid boiler slag was deposited, which now shows up as a zone dominated by heather, Calluna vulgaris.

== See also ==
- Sodium carbonate
- Alkali Act
- Deacon Process
- Soda-lime glass
