= St Matthew's Church, Little Lever =

Coordinates: 53.5628°N 2.3735°W

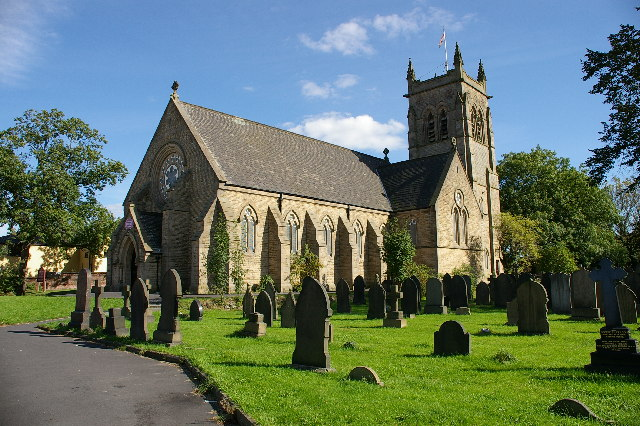
- St Matthew's Church, Little Lever, from the southwest

- Location in Greater Manchester
- OS grid reference: SD 754,074
- Location: Little Lever, Bolton, Greater Manchester
- Country: England
- Denomination: Anglican
- Churchmanship: Anglo-Catholic
- Website: St Matthew, Little Lever

History
- Status: Parish church
- Dedication: Saint Matthew

Architecture
- Functional status: Active
- Heritage designation: Grade II
- Designated: 9 May 2003
- Architect: E. G. Paley
- Architectural type: Church
- Style: Gothic Revival
- Completed: 1865

Specifications
- Materials: Coursed rubble stone with ashlar dressings Slate roofs

Administration
- Province: York
- Diocese: Manchester
- Archdeaconry: Bolton
- Deanery: Bolton
- Parish: St. Matthew, Little Lever

Clergy
- Vicar: Fr Robert Eloff

St Matthew's Church is in the village of Little Lever, Bolton, Greater Manchester, England. It is an active Anglican parish church in the deanery of Bolton, the archdeaconry of Bolton, and the diocese of Manchester. St Matthew's is recorded in the National Heritage List for England as a designated Grade II listed building.

== History ==
St Matthew's was built in 1865 to replace an earlier church built in 1791 on the other side of the street. It was designed by the Lancaster architect E. G. Paley. The tower was increased in height in 1924 as a memorial to the First World War.

== Architecture ==
=== Exterior ===
The church is constructed in coursed rubble stone with ashlar dressings, and a has slate roofs. Its architectural style is early Decorated. The plan consists of a nave, north and south transepts, a west porch, a chancel, a north vestry, and a tower at the southeast corner. The tower is in four stages, with a stair turret in its southeast corner. The bell openings have two lights and louvres. In the stair turret there are small lancet windows. At the summit of the tower is a plain parapet and corner pinnacles. Along the walls of the nave are two-light windows separated by buttresses. At the west end are large buttresses, a gabled porch, and a rose window. On the south wall of the chancel is a small three-light window, and on the north side, over the vestry, are two lancet windows. At the east end is a three-light window containing plate tracery. On the gable ends are finials.

=== Interior ===
In the chancel is a stone reredos, with stone panels containing the Ten Commandments and the Creed on each side, and a double sedilia. The choir stalls, organ front and screen are elaborately carved. The chancel is floored with Minton tiles. At the west end is a gallery, under which is a glazed screen. The pulpit and font are both "heavy stone tubs". The three-manual organ was built in 1884 by Brindley and Foster, and enlarged by the same firm in 1911.

=== Churchyard ===
The churchyard contains the war graves of five soldiers of the First World War, and two soldiers and two Royal Navy sailors of the Second World War.

== See also ==
- Listed buildings in Little Lever
- List of churches in Greater Manchester
- List of ecclesiastical works by E. G. Paley
