= Little Lever =

Village in Greater Manchester, England

Coordinates: 53.563°N 2.369°W

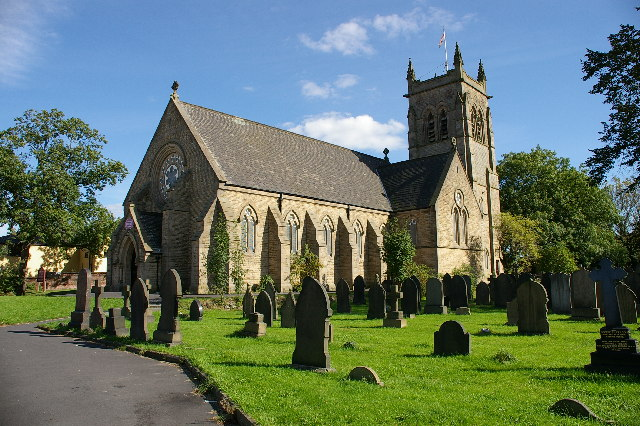
- St Matthew's Church, Little Lever

- Location within Greater Manchester
- Population: 10,100
- OS grid reference: SD755074
- Metropolitan borough: Bolton
- Metropolitan county: Greater Manchester
- Region: North West
- Country: England
- Sovereign state: United Kingdom
- Post town: BOLTON
- Postcode district: BL3
- Dialling code: 01204
- Police: Greater Manchester
- Fire: Greater Manchester
- Ambulance: North West
- UK Parliament: Bolton North East

Little Lever is a village in the Metropolitan Borough of Bolton, Greater Manchester, England. Within the historic county of Lancashire, it is 2 miles (3.2 km) southeast of Bolton, 2 miles (3.2 km) west of Radcliffe and 4 miles (6.4 km) southwest of Bury. In the 19th century, the population was employed in cotton mills, paper mills, bleach works, terracotta works, a rope works and numerous collieries.

== History ==
=== Toponymy ===
Lever is derived from the Old English laefre, which means "place where the rushes grow". The township was recorded as Parua Lefre in 1212, from the Latin, parva meaning little. The name was recorded in several ways: Lethre in 1221, Leuere in 1278, Leuir in 1282, Leuer in 1291 and Leyver in 1550.

=== Manor ===
The manor of Little Lever was part of the barony of Manchester, and during the Middle Ages it was governed by the manorial land holder, the Baron of Manchester. Records show that in the time of Henry II, a parcel of land within the manor, consisting of one moiety, was rented to Alexander son of Uvieth for a half mark (6s 8d) and a hawk (12d).

In 1212, the village was assessed as four oxgangs of land and was held in moieties, but the name of the tenant is not listed. In 1227 Adam de Radcliffe was called upon by Robert Grelley, the Baron of Manchester to perform suit every two weeks at his court of Manchester regarding the village of Little Lever. In 1246 the lord of the manor was recorded as Leising de Lever.

During the next hundred years, the de Lever family took control of the moieties. In around 1320, the manor was jointly controlled in homage by William de Ratcliffe and William de Lever. This homage each year amounted to 4d and a fee of 6s 8d and 1s for provision of future for the sergeant and foresters, a total of 8s. Several cases were brought before courts by family members trying to take control of the manor. A settlement in 1331 found in favour of Adam, son of Ellis de Lever, and thus the family line was settled. There are no records about the ownership until 1448, when Henry Lever the elder owed rent of 25s on the village.

In 1623 the Bubonic Plague killed a third of the village population.

By 1666, the village had sixty hearths liable to tax. Records show the land used for agriculture, and the main landowner was John Andrews, who had the only large house in the village which contained 9 hearths. The manor house, Little Lever Hall, built of wood and plaster, was destroyed in the 18th century. It was a seat of the Levers in 1567, and after that the Andrews who inherited the Lever's estate in Rivington.

=== Industry ===
There is a record of a coal pit in 1320.

Records show there were fulling-mills in Little Lever before 1559. The holding of Adam Byrom of Salford who died in 1559 was described as "an estate of eight messuages, a moiety of two fulling-mills etc., in Little Lever", his three-year-old grandson Ralph, was his heir. Adam's great-grandson Ralph Byrom, died in 1599 without issue, leaving his fourteen-year-old brother Adam as heir to twelve messuages, half a water-mill and fulling-mill in Little Lever (or possibly Darcy Lever).

In the 1800s the coal mining industry was spread throughout the area including Kearsley, Outwood, Radcliffe and Little Lever. In 1880 there were ten working pits listed for Little Lever: Bally, Harpurfold, Middle Bents and Stopes, owned by Thomas Fletcher and Sons, Ladyshore, Owl Hole and Victoria owned by John Fletcher and Dingle, Farnworth Bridge and New Rivin, owned by Andrew Knowles and Sons.

The Manchester, Bolton and Bury Canal passed alongside the village, where two basins were used to load coal from the Ladyshore Colliery (originally named, Back o' th' Barn, opened 1830). The pit closed in 1949 and the colliery offices (now a house) and the stables survive.

Bricks and tiles were made along Stopes Road. The industry today is much smaller but Tarmac Topblock still run Crowthers Brickworks. Originally the site of a much larger traditional clay brick works, it is currently used for the production of building materials and produces lightweight blocks for the construction industry. The manufacture of terracotta in the North of England was pioneered by Colonel John Fletcher at his Ladyshore Terracotta Works. The Ladyshore Coal and Terracotta Company supplied the terracotta used in the building in St Stephen and All Martyrs' Church, Lever Bridge.

There were several paper mills situated in the area, two in Little Lever. Creams Mill, founded by James Crompton 1677 and Grundy's Mill, founded by James Grundy in 1760. The name Creams was given by Adam Crompton II who said it described the paper being made.

The three arms of the Manchester, Bolton and Bury Canal meet at Nob End which is approximately 0.5 miles (0.8 km), southwest of the village, making Little Lever a convenient place for lodging and refreshment in the days when the canal was in operation. The proximity of the canal and the coal industry led to the establishment of a small boatbuilding industry for coal transportation. In part 2 of his book, Waterson (the last of 5 generations of boat builders) describes working on the canal.

There was a small chemical works on the outskirts of the village and major chemical works along the canal at Nob End, Farnworth. Bridson, Thomas Ridgeway & Sons, operated the Lever Bank Bleach Works, (later becoming Smith, J. Junior & Company). Wilson Edward & Company operated the Prestolee Alkali Works between 1875 and 1884. The largest and longest lasting chemical works in Little Lever was in Church Street, located on land between the canal and Lever Hall Farm. It was established in 1868 by F.W. Graham, but failed and was rescued by a partnership of Crompton and Potter. Edmund Peel Potter became the sole owner and expanded the business, manufacturing acid and alkali for the cloth bleaching industry. However, it was the production of sodium and potassium bichromate that made Potter's a world leader and by about 1900 the firm had become a limited company. In 1951 Potter's amalgamated with the Eaglescliffe Chemical Company. The company closed in 1969 when it was owned by Albright & Wilson. Until closure Potter family members remained in senior management positions. Edmund Peel Potter was prominent in the local community and endowed a hospital on Chorley New Road, Bolton in pre-NHS years. His son Colonel Colin Kynaston Potter served with distinction in the Boer and First World Wars.(Ref.Papers in Little Lever library reference section)

== Geography ==
Little Lever was a hamlet, bounded on three sides, by the water courses, the River Irwell, the River Croal and Blackbrook. In 1901 it covered 808 acres (3.27 km^{2}) including 37 of inland waterway. In the 2001 Census it is listed as having 1,188 acres (481 hectares).

== Governance ==
Historically a part of the hundred of Salford in the county of Lancashire, until the 19th century, Little Lever was a township and chapelry in the ecclesiastical parish of Deane, in Lancashire.

The Bolton Poor Law Union was established in 1837 under the Poor Law Amendment Act 1834 and was administered as the Board of Guardians. It took responsibility for the administration and funding of the Poor Law in Little Lever and neighbouring townships and chapelries. The Guardians made use of the workhouses at Fletcher Street in Great Bolton and Goose Cote Hill in Turton until in 1861, when a purpose-built union workhouse was opened at Fishpool in Farnworth.

In 1872, the village was governed by a local board of health until 1894 when Little Lever Urban District was formed. The council consisted of twelve members elected from the four wards, Church, Ladyshore, Stopes and West.

In 1974, local government reorganization made Little Lever a part of the Metropolitan Borough of Bolton, Greater Manchester, and is represented on the borough council by three councilors as part of a ward which also covers Darcy Lever. The population of this ward at the 2011 Census was 12,799.

It is represented in the House of Commons of the United Kingdom within the United Kingdom Parliament as part of the Bolton North East constituency. As of the 2024 United Kingdom general election, the Member of Parliament for the constituency is Kirith Entwistle of the Labour Party.

== Demography ==
In 2024, the population was 10,229, with a population density of 3,432/km^{2} in 2021. This figure is significantly higher than Bolton (2,117/km^{2}) and is almost 8 times the average population density of England (434/km^{2}). The Census also shows that the population has a population split of almost equal numbers of males and females which is uncommon in the area.

The population has changed dramatically since the turn of the 20th century, at that time the majority of the population was employed in the labour-intensive areas of coal mining, canal working and the other mill/factory industries. Today the population is more sedentary, employed in other sectors, as Little Lever has little left in the way of industry. Many people today commute out of Little Lever to nearby Bolton, Radcliffe, and Manchester to carry on employment. The main employer within the village is the wholesale/retail sector.

The 2001 census shows approximately 8,000 persons have employment (the majority of the others are children or retired persons), it shows how the main areas of employment break down in terms of socio/economic grouping and employment sector (three top groups only shown).

Classification	Number
Workplace Social Population – Code UV50
Managerial/administrative (Classes AB & C1)	4,200
Skilled manual workers (Class C2)	1,900
Semi skilled/unskilled manual (Class C2)	1,900
Employment groups – Code UV34
Manufacturing	1,300
Wholesale or retail trades	1,200
Health and social work	600

Over the past 40 years, the population has undergone changes and now reflects a more diverse ethnic makeup. The following table compiled from the 2021 Census shows the ethnic makeup and how the ethnic population compares with the figures for Bolton and England.

Ethnic Classification	Number	% Little Lever	% Bolton	% England
Ethnic Breakdown – Code UV09
White	11,771	94	71.9	91.6
African/Caribbean descent	129	1	3.8	2.3
Asian descent	399	3.2	20.1	5.1

== Transport ==
The village lay at the junction of three roads, the road between Farnworth and the adjoining hamlet of Nob End which continued to Radcliffe (A6053) and the road to Bolton (B6209) now replaced by the (A665) as the main route out of Little Lever. Later the Manchester, Bolton and Bury Canal provided direct links to Manchester, Bolton and Bury. There was a railway line from Bury to Bolton via Little Lever (with a station at Bradley Fold) though this was closed in 1970. The nearest railway station is Moses Gate, and Metrolink serves the nearby Radcliffe stop.

The village is served by Bee Network buses from Bolton, Bury and Radcliffe (bus number 524 between Bolton and Bury), Farnworth and Blackrod (bus number 521), and Darcy Lever (bus number 544, Little Lever to Bolton circular). Prior to the introduction of the Bee Network, Little Lever's bus routes were serviced by Diamond North West, and prior to that by First Greater Manchester.

== Economy ==
Little Lever's past is marked by cotton spinning, textile manufacture, paper making and coal mining.

== Infrastructure ==
In the early days of the settlement, water was obtained from local sources and some shallow wells driven into the underlying sandstone. As the industry took a hold, more water and from a reliable source was required. The Bury Improvement Act 1872 (35 & 36 Vict. c. cxlvi) allowed the Bury Improvement Commissioners to take over the Bury and Radcliffe Waterworks Company (who supplied Little Lever) and Haslingden and Rawtenstall Waterworks Company. In 1876, the commissioners were replaced by Bury Corporation.

The Bury and District Joint Water Board was set up in 1900 with responsibility for Bury County Borough, the municipal boroughs of Haslingden, Radcliffe and Rawtenstall and the urban districts of Kearsley, Little Lever, Ramsbottom and Tottington). The name was changed in 1935 to the Irwell Valley Water Board and then in 1962, under the Bolton Water Order 1962, was replaced by Bolton Corporation Waterworks. In 1974 with the changes in local government, the whole was replaced by the North West Water Authority. In 1995, the North West Water Authority merged with NORWEB (the former North Western Electricity Board) to form United Utilities, who currently control water infrastructure for the North West England region, including Little Lever.

== Education ==
There are seven schools in Little Lever, controlled by Bolton Metropolitan Borough education department: There are five primary schools, Bowness Community Primary, Masefield Community Primary, Mytham Community Primary, St Matthew's C of E Primary and St Teresa's RC Primary.

There is only one secondary school, Little Lever School, formerly a specialist language college which now focuses on Business and Enterprise, and there is one special education school, Ladywood School.

Other facilities include pre-school playgroups, nursery schools, and a library whose former building was built in 1939. However, the library has since moved to a newer building, opposite King's Church, which it shares with three GP practices. The former library building's exterior has been preserved, whilst the interior is now occupied by a nursery as its baby house.

== Sports and leisure ==
There is a purpose-built leisure centre adjacent to Little Lever School with sports hall, gymnasium, squash courts, all-weather pitch and extensive playing fields. There are also facilities around the village for football, rounders, bowls and cricket. Little Lever Cricket Club is a long established facility which includes a social club and bar. The cricket team play in the Bolton Cricket League and in the 1890s an association football club (Little Lever F.C.) was spun out of the cricket club, playing at senior non-league level. There are also a number of youth organizations, a youth club, an old age pensioners' club, and a Women's Institute branch. There are several public houses and political, sports and social clubs.

Little Lever is located on the edge of Moses Gate Country Park, a 750-acre (3.0 km^{2}) park which spans the valleys of the River Croal and River Irwell.

== Religion ==
Ringley Chapel was built in the Outwood area of the township of Pilkington in the ancient parish of Prestwich-cum-Oldham which belonged to the Manchester Classis. Kearsley and Little Lever were in the Parish of Deane and therefore in the Bury Classis. For convenience, members of the congregation in Kearsley and Little Lever attended Ringley Chapel. At a meeting at Ringley on 12 July 1649, it was agreed that parishioners who wished to join the Ringley congregation should be allowed to do so and should be released from the Bury Classis accordingly. The religion at that time was Puritan and there was one well known nonconformist divine by the name of Oliver Heywood who preached to the wealthy families of the area such as Captain Peter Seddon. In 1667, he wrote and distributed copies of his book 'Heart treasure'.

The first church built in Little Lever was St Matthew's in 1791. The Congregational Church in Market Street was founded in 1857. In 1972, the Congregational Church closed, when it joined the Presbyterian Church to become the United Reformed Church.

There are several other churches representing different denominations in Little Lever: King's Church Little Lever (non denominational) in Market Street was founded in 1982, Christ Church joint Methodist and United Reformed Church in Mytham Road formed in 2000 (from constituent chapels founded before 1892), St Teresa's Roman Catholic Church in Redcar Road, opened in 1975, and the Kingdom Hall of Jehovah's Witnesses, Mytham Road.

There are graveyards at the parish church of St Matthew, the King's Centre and Christ Church. The closed Congregational Church had a graveyard.

== Notable people ==
Thomas Lever, born here in 1521, was an English Protestant reformer and served as the Archdeacon of Coventry from 1561 until his death in 1577.

- Sara Cox, radio presenter grew up here

== See also ==
- Darcy Lever
- Great Lever
- Listed buildings in Little Lever
- List of mining disasters in Lancashire

== Bibliography ==
- Mills, A. D. (1998). Dictionary of English Place-Names. Oxford. ISBN 0-19-280074-4.
