= Deacon process =

Industrial process

The Deacon process, invented by Henry Deacon, is a process used during the manufacture of alkalis (the initial end product was sodium carbonate) by the Leblanc process. Hydrogen chloride gas was converted to chlorine gas, which was then used to manufacture a commercially valuable bleaching powder, and at the same time the emission of waste hydrochloric acid was curtailed. To some extent this technically sophisticated process superseded the earlier manganese dioxide process.

== Process ==
The process was based on the oxidation of hydrogen chloride:

4 HCl + O_{2} → 2 Cl_{2} + 2H_{2}O

The reaction takes place at about 400 to 450 °C in the presence of a variety of catalysts, including copper chloride (CuCl_{2}). Three companies developed commercial processes for producing chlorine based on the Deacon reaction:

- The Kel-Chlor process developed by the M. W. Kellogg Company, which utilizes nitrosylsulfuric acid.
- The Shell-Chlor process developed by the Shell Oil Company, which utilizes copper catalysts.
- The MT-Chlor process developed by the Mitsui Toatsu Company, which utilizes chromium-based catalysts.

The Deacon process is now outdated technology. Most chlorine today is produced by using electrolytic processes. New catalysts based on ruthenium(IV) oxide have been developed by Sumitomo.

== Leblanc-Deacon process ==
The Leblanc-Deacon process is a modification of the Leblanc process. The Leblanc process was notoriously environmentally unfriendly, and resulted in some of the first Air and Water pollution acts. In 1874, Henry Deacon had derived a process to reduce HCl emissions as mandated by the Alkali Act. In this process, hydrogen chloride is oxidized by oxygen over a copper chloride catalyst, resulting in the production of chlorine. This was widely used in the paper and textile industries as a bleaching agent, and as a result sodium carbonate was no longer the primary product of these plants, and henceforth sold at a loss.

== See also ==
- Alkali act
- Leblanc process
- Hydrochloric acid
- Chlorine production
