= Calcium sulfide =

Chemical compound of formula CaS

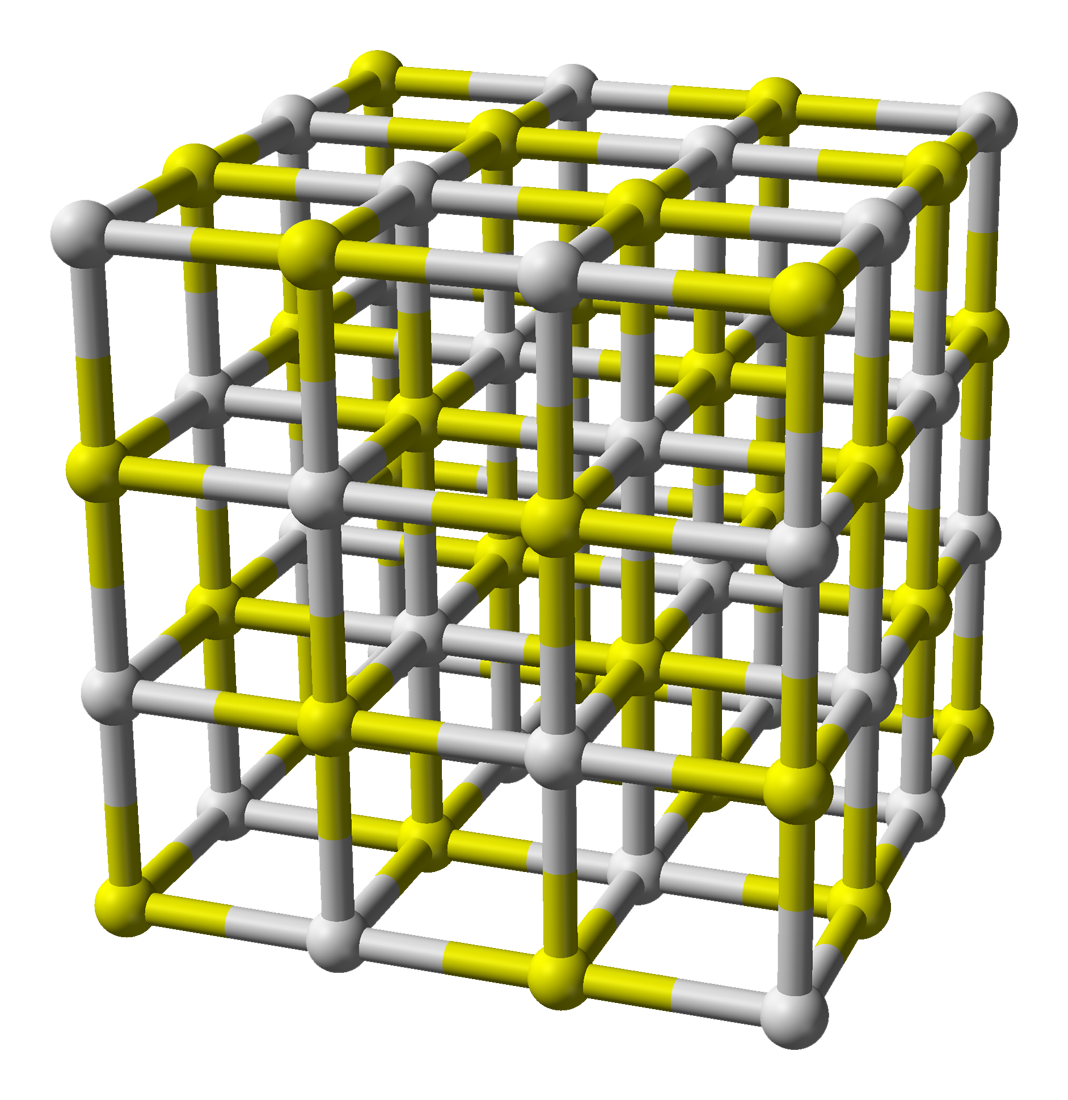
- Calcium sulfide

Names
- IUPAC name Calcium sulfide
- Other names: Calcium monosulfide; Hepar calcies; Sulfurated lime; Oldhamite

Identifiers
CAS Number	20548-54-3
3D model (JSmol)	Interactive image; Interactive image
ChEBI	CHEBI:81055
ChemSpider	8373113
ECHA InfoCard	100.039.869
EC Number	243-873-5
KEGG	C17392
PubChem CID	10197613
UNII	1MBW07J51Q
CompTox Dashboard (EPA)	DTXSID30885140
- InChI: InChI=1S/Ca.S/q+2;-2 Key: AGVJBLHVMNHENQ-UHFFFAOYSA-N; InChI=1/Ca.S/rCaS/c1-2 Key: JGIATAMCQXIDNZ-WSLZQIQFAE; InChI=1/Ca.S/q+2;-2 Key: AGVJBLHVMNHENQ-UHFFFAOYAE
- SMILES: [Ca]=S; [Ca+2].[S-2]

Properties
Chemical formula	CaS
Molar mass	72.143 g/mol
Appearance	white crystals hygroscopic
Density	2.59 g/cm^{3}
Melting point	2,525 °C (4,577 °F; 2,798 K)
Solubility in water	Hydrolyses
Solubility	Insoluble in alcohol reacts with acid
Refractive index (n_{D})	2.137

Structure
Crystal structure	Halite (cubic), cF8
Space group	Fm3̅m, No. 225
Lattice constant	a = 0.56908 nm
Coordination geometry	Octahedral (Ca^{2+}); octahedral (S^{2−})

Hazards
- Occupational safety and health (OHS/OSH)
Main hazards	Reacts with water to release H_{2}S
- GHS labelling
Pictograms	(GHS05: Corrosive) (GHS07: Exclamation mark) (GHS09: Environmental hazard)
Signal word	Warning
Hazard statements	H315, H319, H335, H400
Precautionary statements	P261, P273, P305+P351+P338
NFPA 704 (fire diamond)	2 0 3

Related compounds
Other anions	Calcium oxide
Other cations	Magnesium sulfide; Strontium sulfide; Barium sulfide
Related sulfides	Sodium sulfide
- Except where otherwise noted, data are given for materials in their standard state (at 25 °C [77 °F], 100 kPa). verify (what is ?) Infobox references

Calcium sulfide is the chemical compound with the formula CaS. This white material crystallizes in cubes like rock salt. CaS has been studied as a component in a process that would recycle gypsum, a product of flue-gas desulfurization. Like many salts containing sulfide ions, CaS typically has an odour of H_{2}S, which results from small amount of this gas formed by hydrolysis of the salt.

In terms of its atomic structure, CaS crystallizes in the same motif as sodium chloride indicating that the bonding in this material is highly ionic. The high melting point is also consistent with its description as an ionic solid. In the crystal, each S^{2−} ion is surrounded by an octahedron of six Ca^{2+} ions, and complementarily, each Ca^{2+} ion surrounded by six S^{2−} ions.

== Production ==
CaS is produced by carbothermic reduction of calcium sulfate, which entails the conversion of carbon, usually as charcoal, to carbon dioxide:

CaSO_{4} + 2 C → CaS + 2 CO_{2}

and can react further:

3 CaSO_{4} + CaS → 4 CaO + 4 SO_{2}

In the second reaction the sulfate (+6 oxidation state) oxidizes the sulfide (−2 oxidation state) to sulfur dioxide (+4 oxidation state), while it is being reduced to sulfur dioxide itself (+4 oxidation state).

CaS is also a byproduct in the Leblanc process, a once major industrial process for producing sodium carbonate. In that process sodium sulfide reacts with calcium carbonate:

Na_{2}S + CaCO_{3} → CaS + Na_{2}CO_{3}

Millions of tons of this calcium sulfide byproduct was discarded, causing extensive pollution and controversy.

Milk of lime, Ca(OH)_{2}, reacts with elemental sulfur to give a "lime-sulfur", which has been used as an insecticide. The active ingredient is probably a calcium polysulfide, not CaS.

== Reactivity and uses ==
Calcium sulfide decomposes upon contact with water, including moist air, giving a mixture of Ca(SH)_{2}, Ca(OH)_{2}, and Ca(SH)(OH).

CaS + H_{2}O → Ca(SH)(OH)
Ca(SH)(OH) + H_{2}O → Ca(OH)_{2} + H_{2}S

It reacts with acids such as hydrochloric acid to release toxic hydrogen sulfide gas.

CaS + 2 HCl → CaCl_{2} + H_{2}S

Calcium sulfide is phosphorescent, and will glow a blood red for up to an hour after a light source is removed.

As a noxious byproduct of the Leblanc process, it can be converted to calcium carbonate and hydrogen sulfide, the latter of which can be used as a sulfur source for the lead chamber process to produce the sulfuric acid necessary for the Leblanc process:

CaS(s) + CO_{2}(g) + H_{2}O(l) → CaCO_{3}(s) + H_{2}S(g)

== Natural occurrence ==
Oldhamite is the name for mineralogical form of CaS. It is a rare component of some meteorites and has scientific importance in solar nebula research. Burning of coal dumps can also produce the compound.

== See also ==
- Glossary of meteoritics
