= Chloralkali process =

Industrial process for electrolysis of sodium chloride

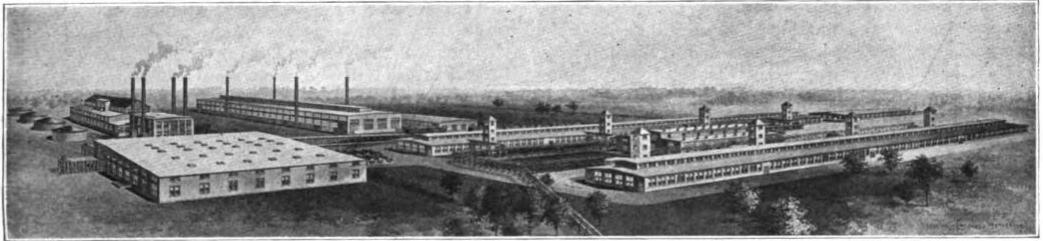
Old drawing of a chloralkali process plant (Edgewood, Maryland)

The chloralkali process (also chlor-alkali and chlor alkali) is an industrial process for the electrolysis of sodium chloride (NaCl) solutions. It is the technology used to produce chlorine and sodium hydroxide (caustic soda), which are commodity chemicals required by industry. 35 million tons of chlorine were prepared by this process in 1987. In 2022, this had increased to about 97 million tonnes. The chlorine and sodium hydroxide produced in this process are widely used in the chemical industry.

Usually the process is conducted on a brine (an aqueous solution of concentrated NaCl), in which case sodium hydroxide (NaOH), hydrogen, and chlorine result. When using calcium chloride or potassium chloride, the products contain calcium or potassium instead of sodium. Related processes are known that use molten NaCl to give chlorine and sodium metal or condensed hydrogen chloride to give hydrogen and chlorine.

The process has a high energy consumption, for example around 2,500 kWh (9,000 MJ) of electricity per tonne of sodium hydroxide produced. Because the process yields equivalent amounts of chlorine and sodium hydroxide (two moles of sodium hydroxide per mole of chlorine), it is necessary to find a use for these products in the same proportion. For every mole of chlorine produced, one mole of hydrogen is produced. Much of this hydrogen is used to produce hydrochloric acid, ammonia, hydrogen peroxide, or is burned for power and/or steam production.

== History ==
The chloralkali process has been in use since the 19th century and is a primary industry in the United States, Western Europe, and Japan. It has become the principal source of chlorine during the 20th century. The diaphragm cell process and the mercury cell process have been used for over 100 years but are environmentally unfriendly through their use of asbestos and mercury, respectively. The membrane cell process, which was only developed in the past 60 years, is a superior method with its improved energy efficiency and lack of harmful chemicals.

Although the first formation of chlorine by the electrolysis of brine was attributed to chemist William Cruikshank in 1800, it was 90 years later that the electrolytic method was used successfully on a commercial scale. Industrial scale production began in 1892. In 1833, Faraday formulated the laws that governed the electrolysis of aqueous solutions, and patents were issued to Cook and Watt in 1851 and to Stanley in 1853 for the electrolytic production of chlorine from brine.

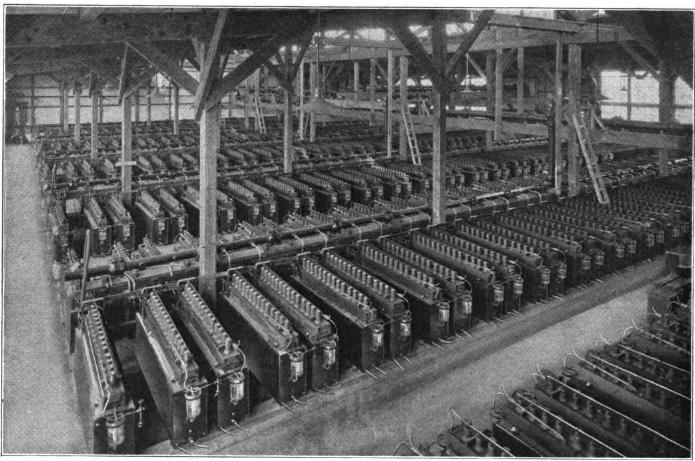
Cell room of a chlor-alkali plant ca. 1920

== Process systems ==
Three production methods are in use. While the mercury cell method produces chlorine-free sodium hydroxide, the use of several tonnes of mercury leads to serious environmental problems. In a normal production cycle a few hundred pounds of mercury per year are emitted, which accumulate in the environment. Additionally, the chlorine and sodium hydroxide produced via the mercury-cell chloralkali process are themselves contaminated with trace amounts of mercury. The membrane and diaphragm method use no mercury, but the sodium hydroxide contains chlorine, which must be removed.

=== Membrane cell ===
The most common chloralkali process involves the electrolysis of aqueous sodium chloride (a brine) in a membrane cell. A membrane, such as Nafion, Flemion or Aciplex, is used to prevent the reaction between the chlorine and hydroxide ions.

Basic membrane cell used in the electrolysis of brine. At the anode (A), chloride (Cl^{−}) is oxidized to chlorine. The ion-selective membrane (B) allows the counterion Na+ to freely flow across, but prevents anions such as hydroxide (OH^{−}) and chloride from diffusing across. At the cathode (C), water is reduced to hydroxide and hydrogen gas. The net process is the electrolysis of an aqueous solution of NaCl into industrially useful products sodium hydroxide (NaOH) and chlorine gas.

Saturated brine is passed into the first chamber of the cell. Due to the higher concentration of chloride ions in the brine, the chloride ions are oxidised at the anode, losing electrons to become chlorine gas (A in figure):

2 Cl^{−} → Cl_{2} + 2 e^{−}

At the cathode, positive hydrogen ions pulled from water molecules are reduced by the electrons provided by the electrolytic current, to hydrogen gas, releasing hydroxide ions into the solution (C in figure):

2 H_{2}O + 2 e^{−} → H_{2} + 2 OH^{−}

The ion-permeable ion-exchange membrane at the center of the cell allows only the sodium ions (Na^{+}) to pass to the second chamber where they react with the hydroxide ions to produce caustic soda (NaOH) (B in figure):

Na^{+} + OH^{−} → NaOH

The overall reaction for the electrolysis of brine is thus:

2 NaCl + 2 H_{2}O → Cl_{2} + H_{2} + 2 NaOH

=== Diaphragm cell ===
In the diaphragm cell process, there are two compartments separated by a permeable diaphragm, often made of asbestos fibers. Brine is introduced into the anode compartment and flows into the cathode compartment. Similarly to the membrane cell, chloride ions are oxidized at the anode to produce chlorine, and at the cathode, water is split into caustic soda and hydrogen. The diaphragm prevents the reaction of the caustic soda with the chlorine. A diluted caustic brine leaves the cell. The caustic soda must usually be concentrated to 50% and the salt removed. This is done using an evaporative process with about three tonnes of steam per tonne of caustic soda. The salt separated from the caustic brine can be used to saturate diluted brine. The chlorine contains oxygen and must often be purified by liquefaction and evaporation.

=== Mercury cell ===
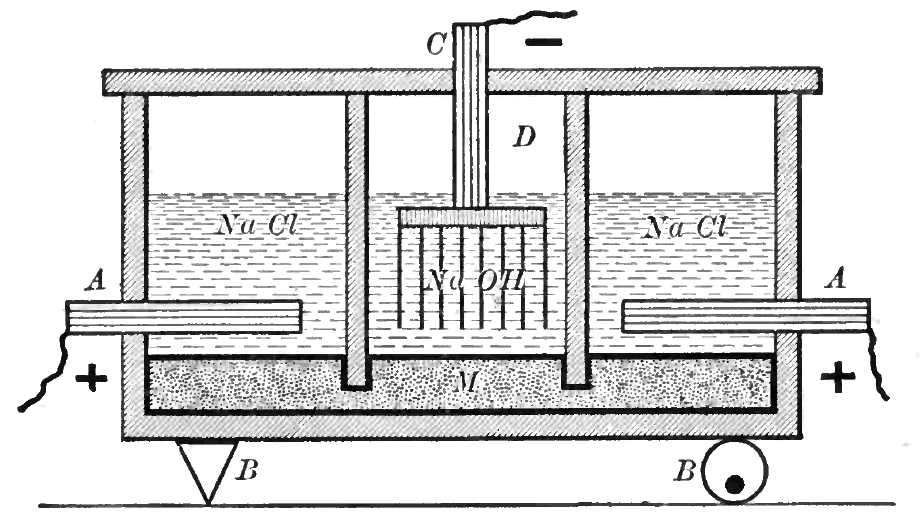
Diagram of the mercury-cell process, showing an "inner" cell sandwiched between two "outer" cells, with a layer of mercury common to all three.

In the mercury-cell process, also known as the Castner–Kellner process, the "outer" electrolytic cells each contain an anode immersed in brine, which floats on a layer of mercury. The "inner" cells each contain a cathode in a sodium hydroxide solution, floating on the same mercury layer. The walls dividing the cells have gaps below the surface of the mercury layer. This allows mercury to flow between cells, while preventing the aqueous solutions from doing so.

In the "outer" cell, chloride ions are oxidized at the anode, producing chlorine gas which bubbles out of the cell. The mercury layer acts as the cathode, here sodium ions in the brine are reduced and form an amalgam with the mercury. Once in the amalgam, sodium atoms are free to move to the "inner" cell.

In the "inner" cell, the mercury layer now acts as the anode. Sodium atoms in the amalgam are oxidized and enter aqueous solution. Meanwhile at the cathode, water is split into hydrogen gas and hydroxide ions.

Mercury cells are being phased out due to concerns about the high toxicity of mercury and mercury poisoning from mercury cell pollution such as occurred in Canada (see Ontario Minamata disease) and Japan (see Minamata disease).

== Unpartitioned cell ==
The initial overall reaction produces hydroxide and also hydrogen and chlorine gases:

2 NaCl + 2 H_{2}O → 2 NaOH + H_{2} + Cl_{2}

Without a membrane, the OH^{−} ions produced at the cathode are free to diffuse throughout the electrolyte. As the electrolyte becomes more basic due to the production of OH^{−}, less Cl_{2} emerges from the solution as it begins to disproportionate to form chloride and hypochlorite ions at the anode:

Cl_{2} + 2 NaOH → NaCl + NaClO + H_{2}O

The more opportunity the Cl_{2} has to interact with NaOH in the solution, the less Cl_{2} emerges at the surface of the solution and the faster the production of hypochlorite progresses. This depends on factors such as solution temperature, the amount of time the Cl_{2} molecule is in contact with the solution, and concentration of NaOH.

Likewise, as hypochlorite increases in concentration, chlorates are produced from them:

3 NaClO → NaClO_{3} + 2 NaCl

This reaction is accelerated at temperatures above about 60 °C. Other reactions occur, such as the self-ionization of water and the decomposition of hypochlorite at the cathode, the rate of the latter depends on factors such as diffusion and the surface area of the cathode in contact with the electrolyte.

If current is interrupted while the cathode is submerged, cathodes that are attacked by hypochlorites, such as those made from stainless steel, will dissolve in unpartitioned cells.

If producing hydrogen and oxygen gases is not a priority, the addition of 0.18% sodium or potassium chromate to the electrolyte will improve the efficiency of producing the other products.

== Electrodes ==
Due to the corrosive nature of chlorine production, the anode (where the chlorine is formed) must be non-reactive and has been made from materials such as platinum metal, graphite (called plumbago in Faraday's time), or platinized titanium. A mixed metal oxide clad titanium anode (also called a dimensionally stable anode) is the industrial standard today. Historically, platinum, magnetite, lead dioxide, manganese dioxide, and ferrosilicon (13–15% silicon) have also been used as anodes. Platinum alloyed with iridium is more resistant to corrosion from chlorine than pure platinum. Unclad titanium cannot be used as an anode because it anodizes, forming a non-conductive oxide and passivates. Graphite will slowly disintegrate due to internal electrolytic gas production from the porous nature of the material and carbon dioxide forming due to carbon oxidation, causing fine particles of graphite to be suspended in the electrolyte that can be removed by filtration. The cathode (where hydroxide forms) can be made from unalloyed titanium, graphite, or a more easily oxidized metal such as stainless steel or nickel.

== Manufacturer associations ==
The interests of chloralkali product manufacturers are represented at regional, national and international levels by associations such as Euro Chlor and The World Chlorine Council.

== See also ==
- Electrochemical engineering
- Gas diffusion electrode
- Solvay process, a similar industrial method of making sodium carbonate from calcium carbonate and sodium chloride
