= Nob End =

Site of Special Scientific Interest in the United Kingdom

Coordinates: 53.553°N 2.379°W

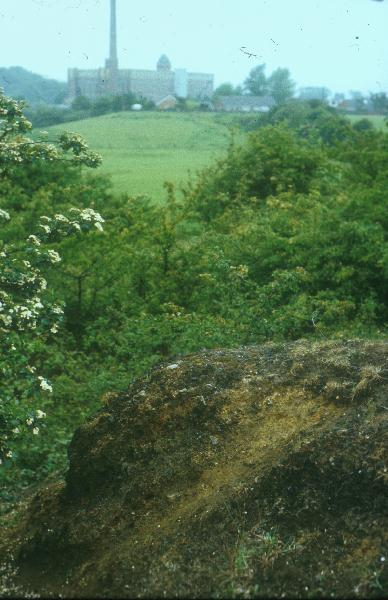
Leblanc process waste cliff, Nob End Bolton, 1997

Nob End is the site of a former waste tip which is now a Site of Special Scientific Interest and local nature reserve near Little Lever and Kearsley, in Greater Manchester, England.

== History ==
Standing at the confluence of the River Irwell and River Croal the site was used around 1850-70 as a tip for toxic alkaline waste from the production of sodium carbonate (soda ash) by the Leblanc process. The waste, known as 'galligu', was a blue sludge (from reduced iron compounds) dominated by calcium sulphide and smelling of bad eggs. The surface of the waste has since weathered down to calcium carbonate, and calcicolous vegetation has colonised the site. As natural limestone grassland does not occur in Greater Manchester, many of the species found are rare in the county.

The 8.8 hectare (21.7 acres) site became a SSSI in 1988, and a local nature reserve in 2000.

In 1936 a major breach in the now defunct Manchester, Bolton and Bury Canal occurred east of the Nob End locks; it was repaired by Watson Homes as part of the Creams Mill development.

== Habitats ==
There are a number of different habitats on the site, the creation of which were dependent upon: the type of waste deposited, the pattern of deposition and the nature of the underlying substrate:

- Open, species rich, calcicolous grassland.
- Fescue grassland with salix scrub.
- Wet areas with rushes, marsh plants and salix scrub.
- Neutral grasslands.
- Acid grasslands.

== Flora ==
The flora found on the site includes: many types of Orchid, Broomrape, Twayblade, Blue fleabane and Carline thistle.

== See also ==
- Blue billy
