= Linnyshaw =

Coordinates: 53.5277°N 2.3839°W

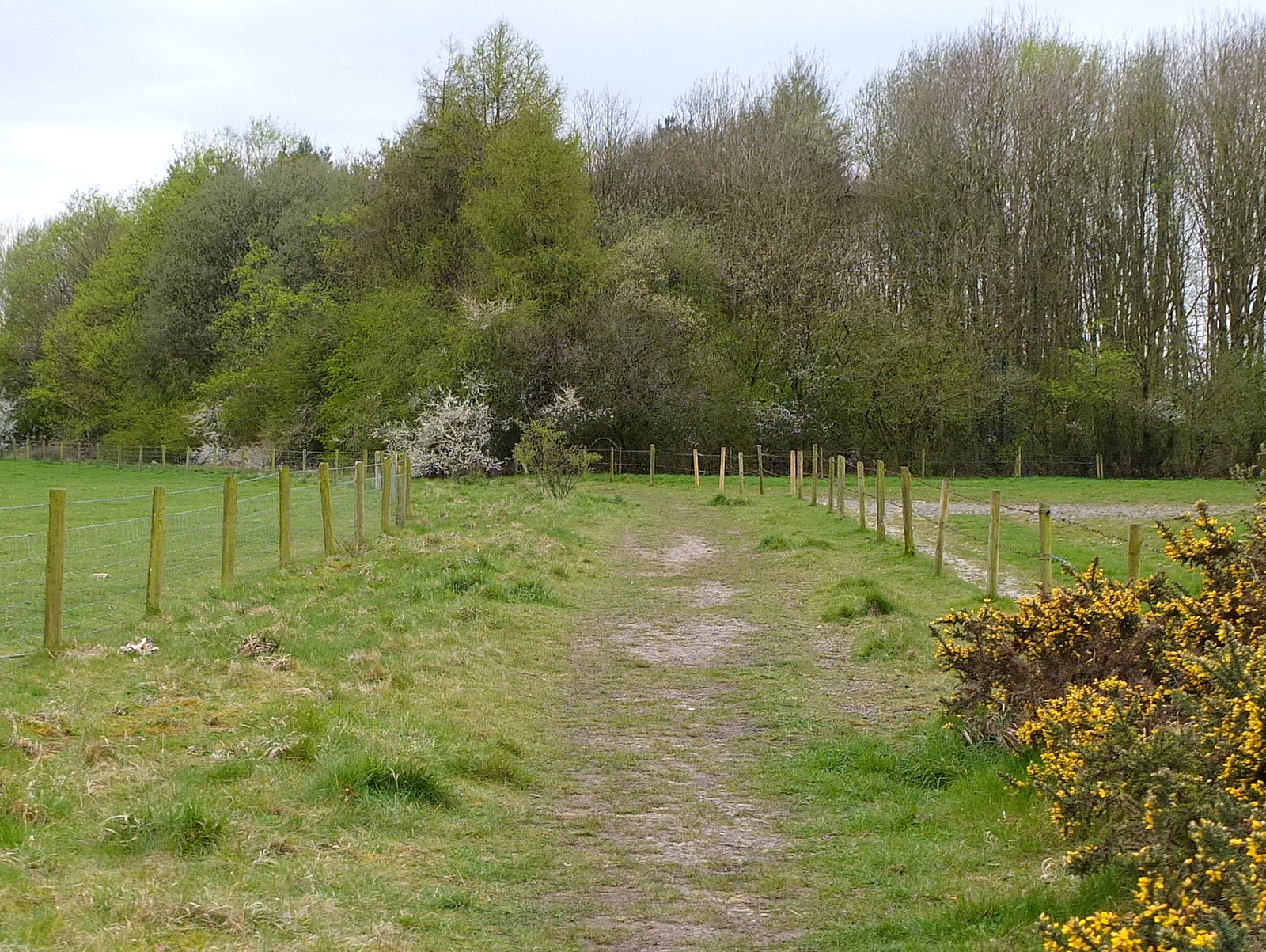
- Salford Trail at Linnyshaw

- Location within Greater Manchester
- OS grid reference: SD745035
- Metropolitan borough: Salford
- Metropolitan county: Greater Manchester
- Region: North West
- Country: England
- Sovereign state: United Kingdom
- Post town: MANCHESTER
- Postcode district: M28
- Dialling code: 0161
- Police: Greater Manchester
- Fire: Greater Manchester
- Ambulance: North West
- UK Parliament: Worsley

Linnyshaw is an area of Walkden, a town in the City of Salford district of Greater Manchester, England. Historically within Lancashire, it lies to the east of Walkden, immediately south of junction 2 of the M61 motorway. The area is predominantly moss and there is a very small population. Linnyshaw lies entirely within the Walkden North council ward and within the Worsley parliamentary constituency. It is bordered by Kearsley to the north and Wardley to the east.

Between 1865 and 1921 Linnyshaw Colliery was operated by the Bridgewater Trustees.

== Shops and businesses ==
Linnyshaw is a mainly residential area, so there are some shops and some other conveniences such as a bakery and hairdressers. There is also a garage and Club 147- a bar, snooker hall and also a Muay Thai boxing gym.
