= Ruthenium(IV) oxide =

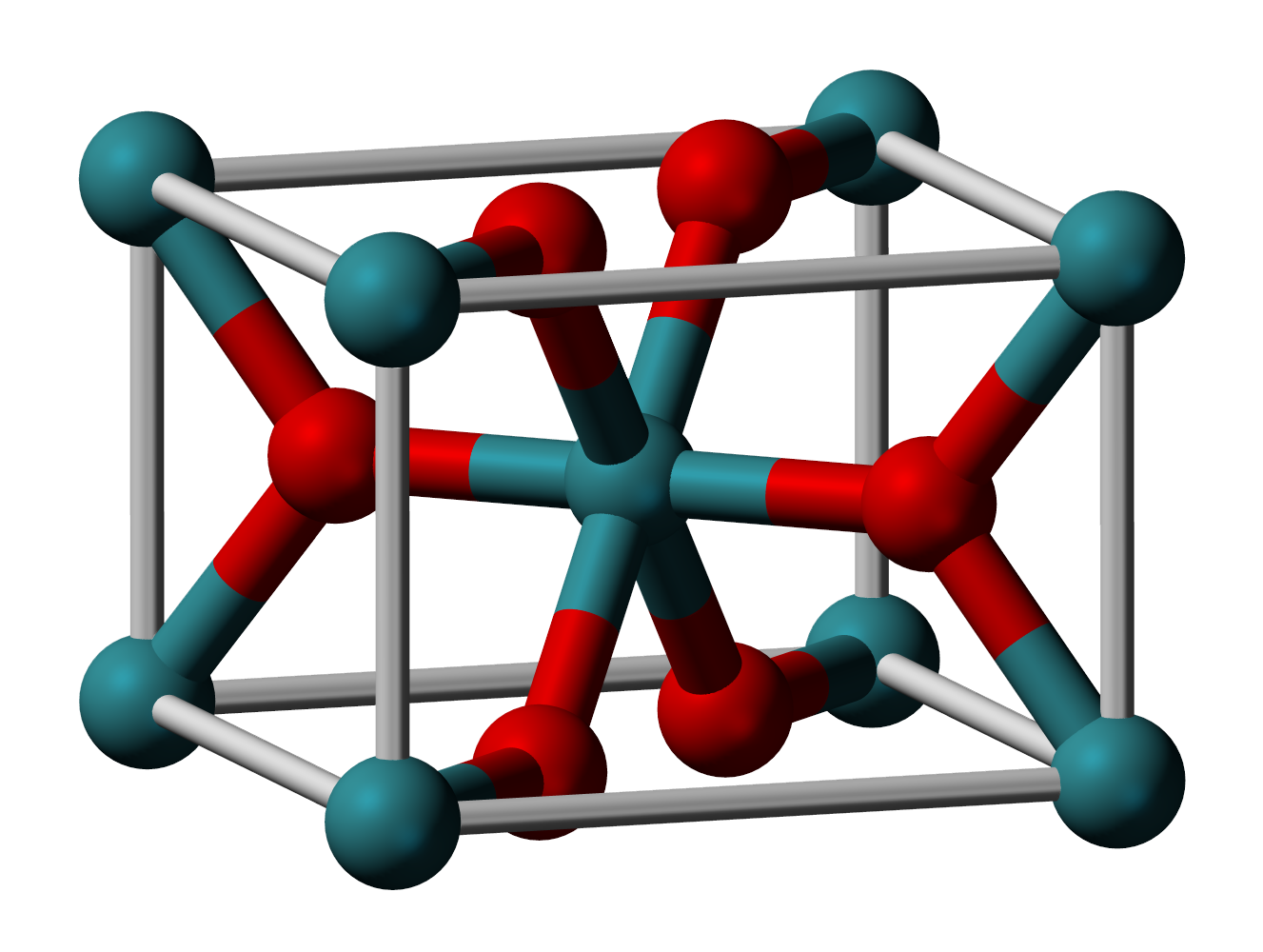

Names
- IUPAC name Ruthenium(IV) oxide
- Other names Ruthenium dioxide

Identifiers
CAS Number	12036-10-1
3D model (JSmol)	Interactive image
ChemSpider	74760
ECHA InfoCard	100.031.660
EC Number	234-840-6
PubChem CID	82848
CompTox Dashboard (EPA)	DTXSID0065193
- InChI: Key: WOCIAKWEIIZHES-UHFFFAOYSA-N; InChI=1S/2O.Ru
- SMILES: O=[Ru]=O

Properties
Chemical formula	RuO_{2}
Molar mass	133.0688 g/mol
Appearance	blue-black solid
Density	6.97 g/cm^{3}
Boiling point	1,200 °C (2,190 °F; 1,470 K) sublimates
Solubility in water	insoluble
Magnetic susceptibility (χ)	+162.0·10^{−6} cm^{3}/mol

Structure
Crystal structure	Rutile (tetragonal), tP6
Space group	P4_{2}/mnm, No. 136
Coordination geometry	Octahedral (Ru^{IV}); trigonal planar (O^{2−})

Hazards
- GHS labelling
Pictograms	(GHS03: Oxidizing) (GHS07: Exclamation mark)
Signal word	Danger
Hazard statements	H272, H319, H413
Precautionary statements	P210, P220, P264+P265, P273, P280, P305+P351+P338, P337+P317, P370+P378, P501
Flash point	Non-flammable

Related compounds
Other anions	Ruthenium disulfide
Other cations	Osmium(IV) oxide
Related ruthenium oxides	Ruthenium tetroxide

Supplementary data page
- Ruthenium(IV) oxide (data page)
- Except where otherwise noted, data are given for materials in their standard state (at 25 °C [77 °F], 100 kPa). verify (what is ?) Infobox references

Ruthenium(IV) oxide is the inorganic compound with the formula RuO_{2}. This black solid is the most common oxide of ruthenium. It is widely used as an electrocatalyst for producing chlorine, chlorine oxides, and O_{2}. Like many dioxides, RuO_{2} adopts the rutile structure.

== Preparation ==
It is usually prepared by oxidation of ruthenium trichloride. Nearly stoichiometric single crystals of RuO_{2} can be obtained by chemical vapor transport, using O_{2} as the transport agent:

RuO_{2} + O_{2} ⇌ RuO_{4}

Films of RuO_{2} can be prepared by chemical vapor deposition (CVD) from volatile ruthenium compounds. RuO_{2} can also be prepared through electroplating from a solution of ruthenium trichloride.

Electrostatically stabilized hydrosols of pristine ruthenium dioxide hydrate have been prepared by exploiting the autocatalytic reduction of ruthenium tetroxide in aqueous solution. The resulting particle populations may be controlled to comprise substantially monodisperse, uniform spheres with diameters in the range 40 nm - 160 nm.

== Uses ==
Ruthenium(IV) oxide is being used as the main component in the catalyst of the Sumitomo-Deacon process which produces chlorine by the oxidation of hydrogen chloride.

RuO_{2} can be used as catalyst in many other situations. Noteworthy reactions are the Fischer–Tropsch process, Haber–Bosch process, and various manifestations of fuel cells.

=== Aspirational and niche applications ===
RuO_{2} is extensively used for the coating of titanium anodes for the electrolytic production of chlorine and for the preparation of resistors or integrated circuits. Ruthenium oxide resistors can be used as sensitive thermometers in the temperature range .02 < T < 4 K. It can be also used as active material in supercapacitor because it has very high charge transfer capability. Ruthenium oxide has great capacity to store charge when used in aqueous solutions. Average capacities of ruthenium(IV) oxide have reached 650 F/g when in sulfuric acid and annealed at temperatures lower than 200 °C. In attempts to optimise its capacitive properties, prior work has looked at the hydration, crystallinity and particle size of ruthenium oxide.
