= Clifton Viaduct =

Railway viaduct in Greater Manchester, England

Coordinates: 53.5273°N 2.314°W

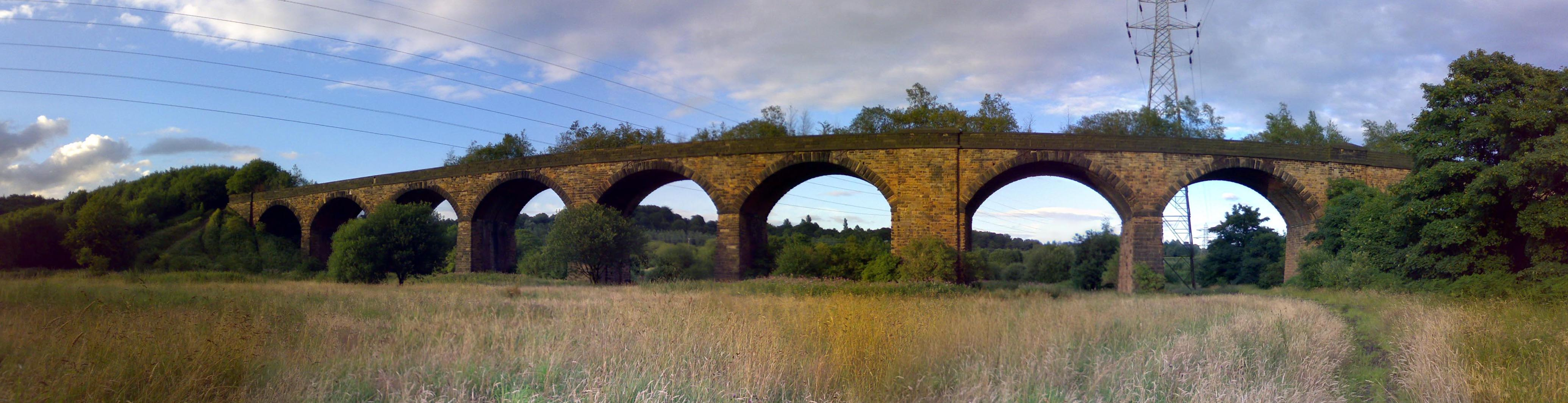
The viaduct looking in a northerly direction with the Irwell and canal out of frame on the right

Clifton Viaduct, known locally as The Thirteen Arches, is a disused railway viaduct near Clifton in Greater Manchester, north-west England. Built in 1846, it closed with the line in 1966 and is now severed from the rest of the route by the M62 motorway and other subsequent development.

== Design ==
The viaduct consists of 13 stone arches with another five approach spans. It was built to carry the railway on a curve over the River Irwell, its valley, and the Manchester, Bolton and Bury Canal. The spans are of equal size except for the arches over the river and canal, which are larger. The river arch reaches 96 feet (29 metres) in height and is 80 feet (24 metres) above the water. The arches are all segmental. They have stepped voussoirs and brick soffits with battered (sloping) piers which are connected to the arches via imposts. The terminating piers are square. The arch over the river uniquely has no imposts and rises straight straight from the ground using flat piers. The parapet is in coped stone and runs the length of the structure above a continuous stone course.

== History ==
The viaduct was constructed in 1846 to carry trains from Manchester to Rossendale along the Manchester, Bury and Rossendale Railway (MBRR; later amalgamated into the East Lancashire Railway Company and then the Lancashire and Yorkshire Railway). It was designed by the MBRR's resident engineer, Charles Edward Cawley and possibly built by John Hawkshaw.

The line was closed in 1966 as part of the Beeching cuts and the viaduct was closed. The bridge deck is not accessible to the public, though the underside can be reached by footpaths. Its approach embankments were severed by later industrial development and bisected by the M62 motorway. Clifton Aqueduct, built to carry the same canal crossed by the railway viaduct and also disused, is nearby.

The viaduct is a Grade II listed building, a status which provides legal protection. It was first listed on 2 September 1987.

== See also ==
- Listed buildings in Swinton and Pendlebury
- List of railway bridges and viaducts in the United Kingdom
- Philips Park, Whitefield
