= Philips Park, Prestwich =

Area of parkland in Prestwich, Greater Manchester, England

Coordinates: 53.53263°N 2.307537°W

Philips Park is an area of parkland situated within the Metropolitan Borough of Bury on the boundary of Whitefield and Prestwich, in Greater Manchester. The park consists of rich woodland and grassland habitat and is home to an assortment of wildlife. Two thirds of the site was once the Philips family estate, and the remainder, known as Waterdale, is Irwell Valley land reclaimed following the demolition of two bleach and dye works. The park is a local nature reserve.

The park is also home to the Barn Countryside Centre. The visitor centre hosts many events for all ages, including willow weaving and pottery workshops, pond dipping and woodland management training courses.

== History ==
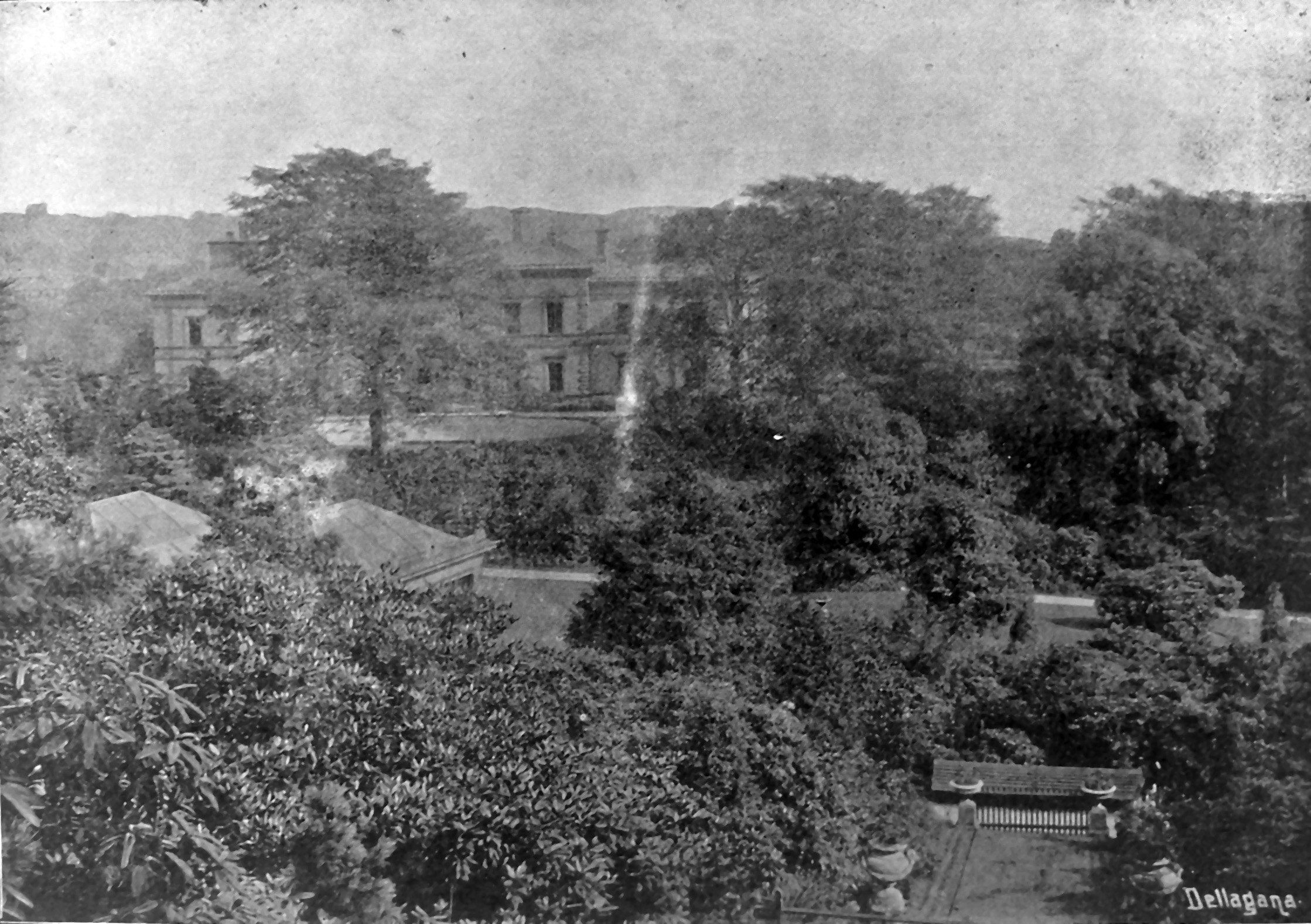
Image of Philips Park taken around 1902

The park owes its name to the Philips family, who owned the land between 1799 and 1948. The land, which was originally part of the medieval Pilkington Park deer park was purchased by Robert Philips of the textile firm J. & N. Philips, in 1798. Robert and his wife Ann had two sons (the politicians Mark Philips and Robert Philips), and nine daughters. Responsible for the construction of the buildings, the Philips family also retained some natural and man-made features when landscaping the area. These included the ancient woodlands of North Wood, Mid Wood, Mere Clough, and a Medieval Deer pale marking the southern and eastern boundaries.

The Liberal Party politician Mark Philips was born in the park on 4 November 1800.

The family lived in Philips Park until the granddaughter of Robert Philips, Anna Maria Philips, died in 1946. The park was sold to Whitefield Council (to be shared with Prestwich Council) and opened as a public park in 1948. The contents of the park were auctioned, with items such as a Georgian mahogany dining room sideboard by Robert Gillow being sold for £6.

In 1971 the construction of the M62 motorway reached the area, removing much of the valley of the North Wood during construction.

== Buildings ==
=== The park ===
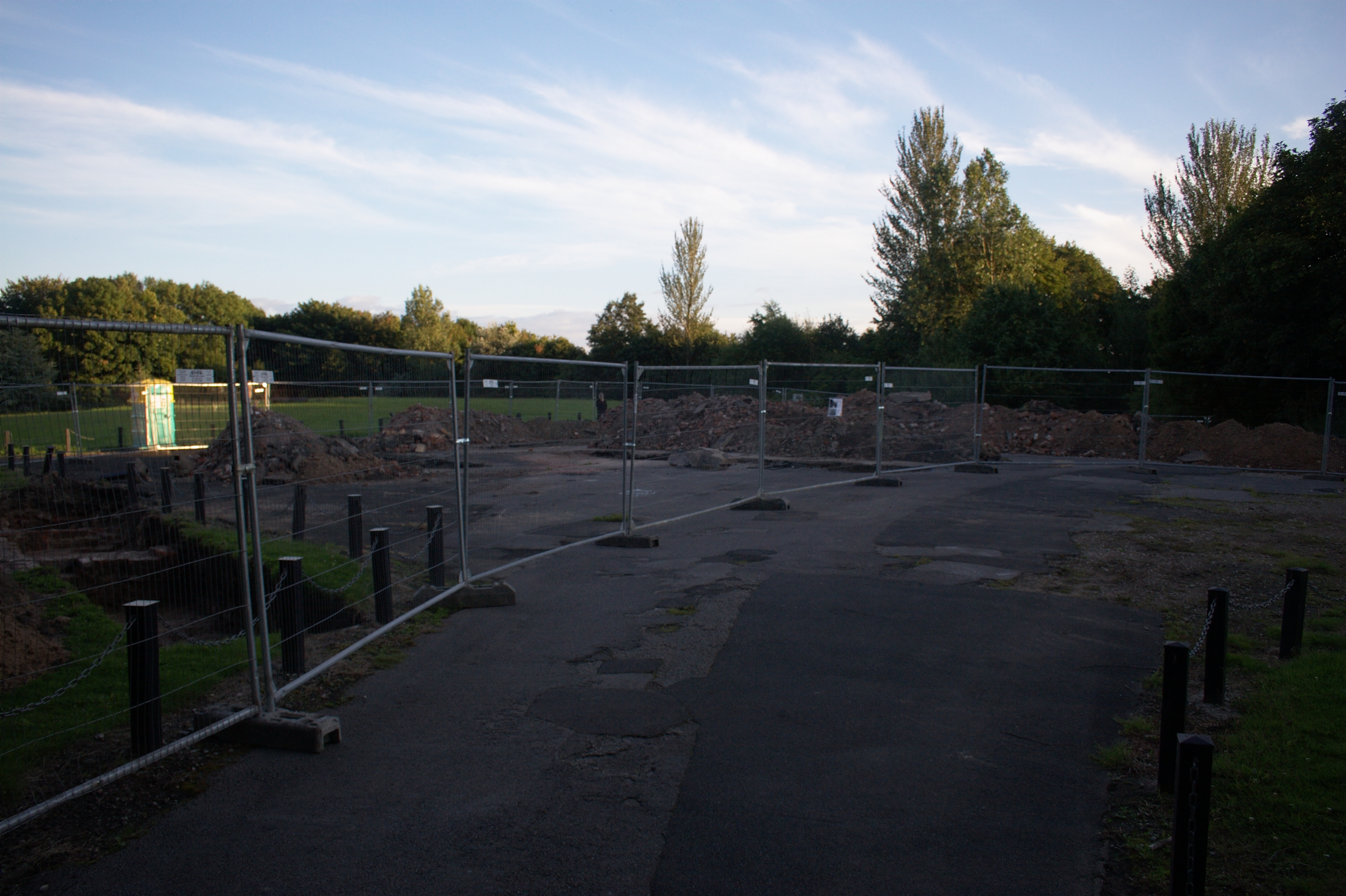
The car park where the park was located. Some of the foundations of the building are visible in this image.

Completed by Robert Philips in 1830, "the park" was the family's main residence. Built in the Italian villa style and furnished by Robert Gillow, the house was situated close to a steep bank which sheltered it from the north. The front was well proportioned and the back faced onto a lawn. The house fell into disrepair and was demolished in 1950. The area where it stood is now occupied by a car park.

Access to the park was originally from Park Lane. In 1852 a viaduct was built enabling carriages to be driven directly from Bury New Road, along Philips Park Road, to the park. The viaduct became unsafe and was closed off for many years before being demolished by the Royal Engineers in a controlled explosion in the 1960s.

=== Outwood Lodge ===
The former home of John Grundy (chairman of the East Lancashire Railway) and later Mark Philips, it overlooked the North Wood and was designed by Johnson of Lichfield. It was replaced by the present North Lodge from around 1890–1900. All that remains is part of a wall outside the North Lodge.

=== North Lodge ===
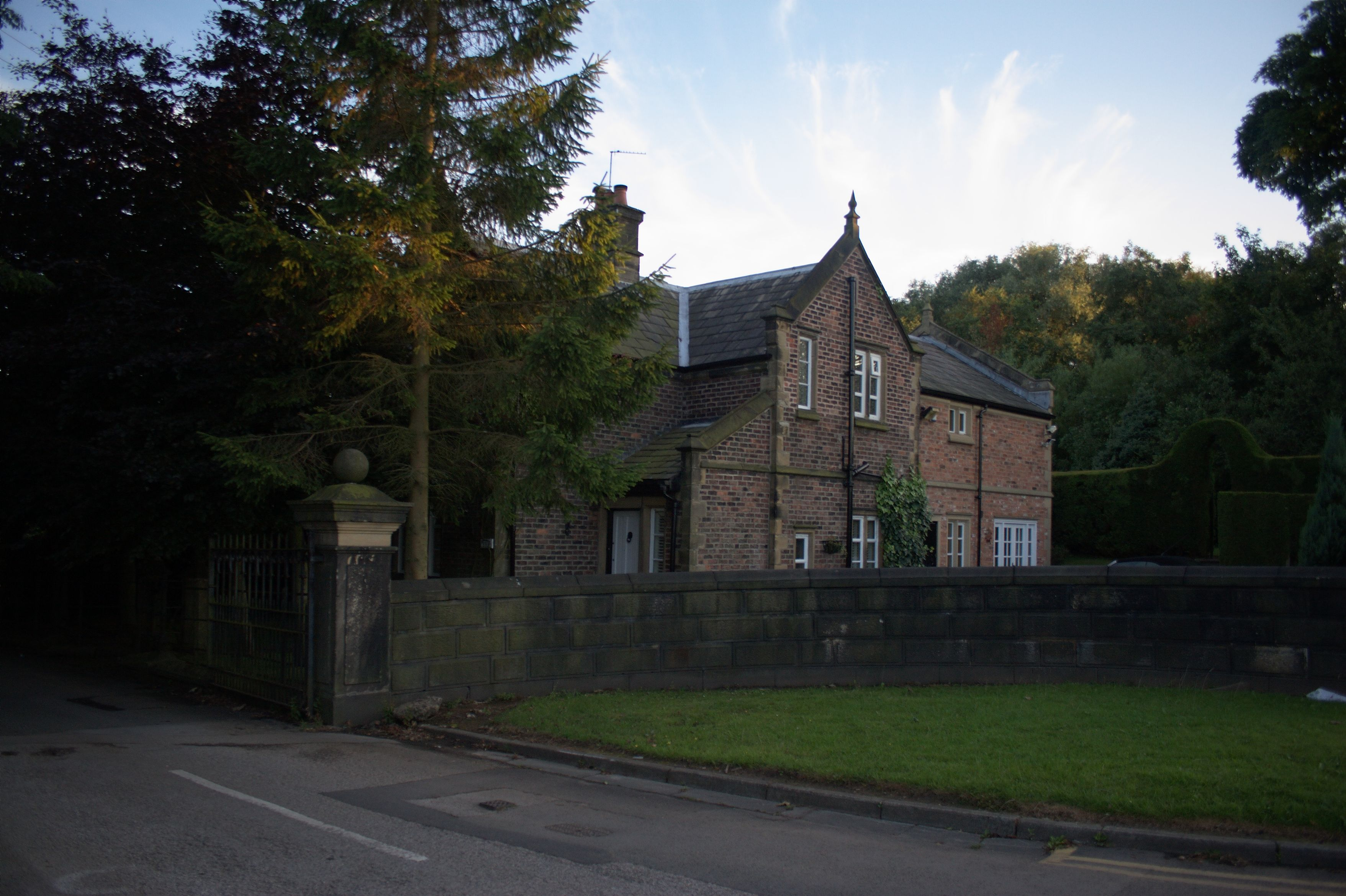
North Lodge with the entrance to Philips Park on the left.

Located at the junction of Philips Park Road and Park Lane, this building replaced Outwood Lodge. Parts of Outwood Lodge were used in its construction. This building was used as staff accommodation until the death of Anna Maria Philips in 1946.

Located at 53.537759,-2.304474

=== Philips Park Road Viaduct ===
This viaduct was built in 1852 at a cost of £8,000. Eight brick arches spanned the valley some 80 feet (24 m) below. The cost of construction was shared between Robert Philips, the Earl of Derby, and the East Lancashire Railway. The viaduct provided a direct route for coaches between Bury New Road, the park and Molyneux Brow railway station. The pathway underneath the viaduct to Mere Clough was the subject of a legal case, when the Earl of Derby's agent, Tom Statter, blocked the pathway to prevent acts of trespass. The case was dismissed and costs awarded against the Earl.

Located at 53.537343,-2.29772

The viaduct was showing severe signs of dilapidation by 1965, and was subsequently demolished in November of the same year. The M60 motorway has replaced the path of the viaduct and other than the height of the motorway at that point (relative to the valley floor), no trace of its existence remains.

=== Philips Park Lodge ===
Philips Park Lodge, known locally as the "Witch's Cottage" was a small thatched cottage dating from and built in the style of the regency period. Latterly, it existed in a neglected condition for some time and had been subject to arson attacks by vandals. It was demolished in 1969 to make way for the M62 motorway.

=== South Lodge ===
The South Lodge, built in the same period as Philips Park Lodge, overlooked a small reservoir east of Molyneux Brow railway station, along an ancient packhorse route. As late as the 1960s, the property had no gas or electricity. Despite attaining listed building status, it fell into disuse and disrepair, and was demolished in 1974.

Located at 53.531862,-2.312837

=== Thatched Cottage ===
The Thatched Cottage was the original entrance lodge to Philips Park. Built alongside a tree-lined driveway, the cottage was replaced in the early 1900s by the North Lodge, although not on the same site. This cottage was demolished to make way for the M62 in 1968.

Located at 53.536896,-2.304103

=== The Stables ===
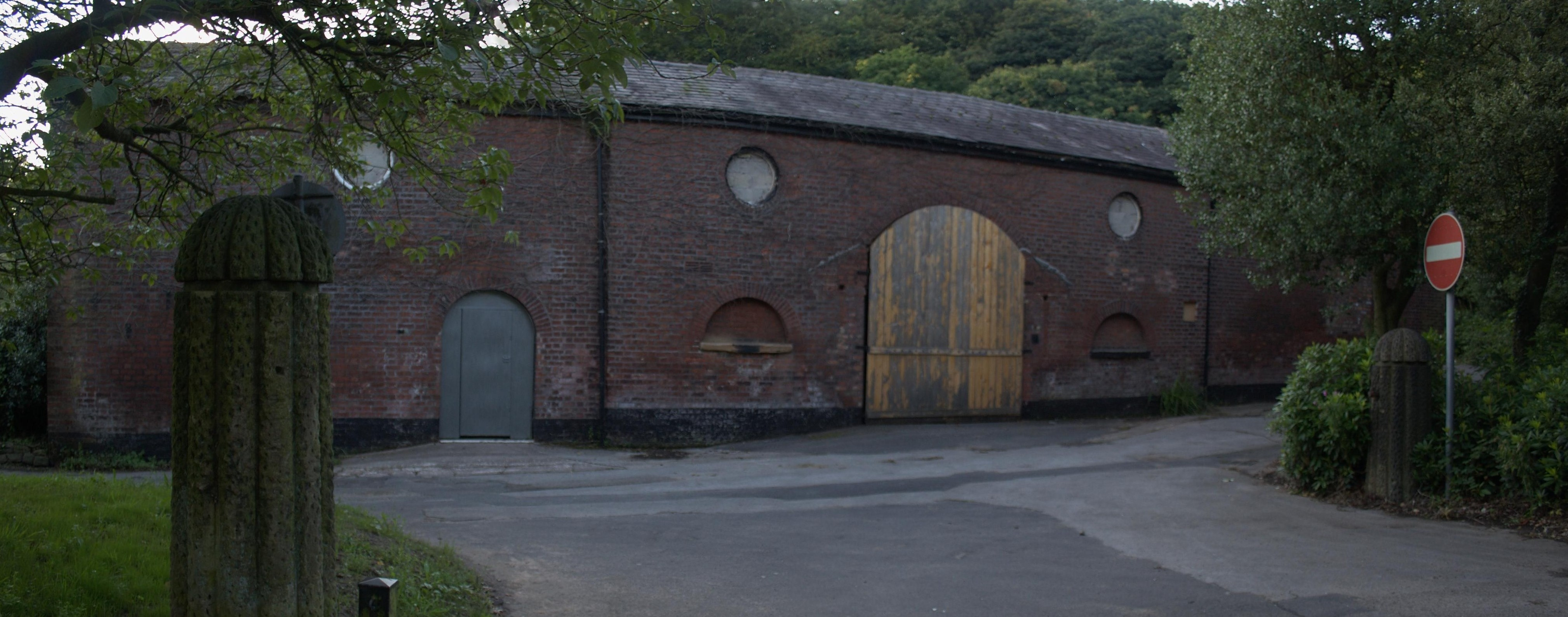
The Stables.

Recently a nightclub, now being restored to pre-20th century state. This has involved the demolition of all the sections that were added to make a nightclub venue, revealing the original courtyard that had become hidden. The project has been supported by a grant from the Heritage Lottery Fund.

== Features ==
=== The Conservatory ===
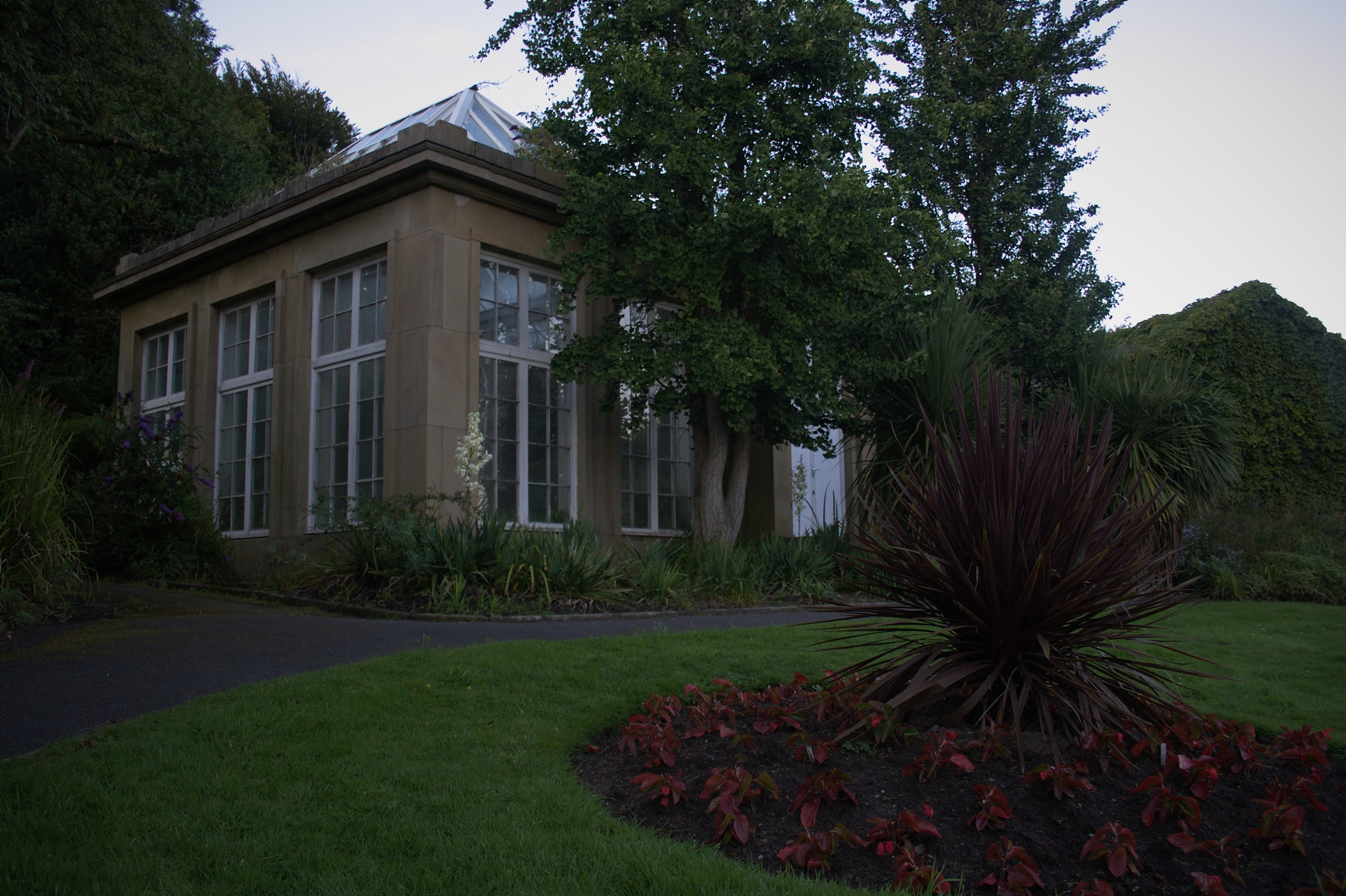
The Conservatory.

The conservatory was built in ashlar sandstone soon after 1800. Its facade has large rectangular windows with glazing bars and a central pediment. Its glazed roof has a circular lantern light. It is a grade II listed building. Its centerpiece was a bronze fountain with a stone basin from Florence, set in a moss lined alcove. A lily pond is below the conservatory.

=== Grass Walk ===
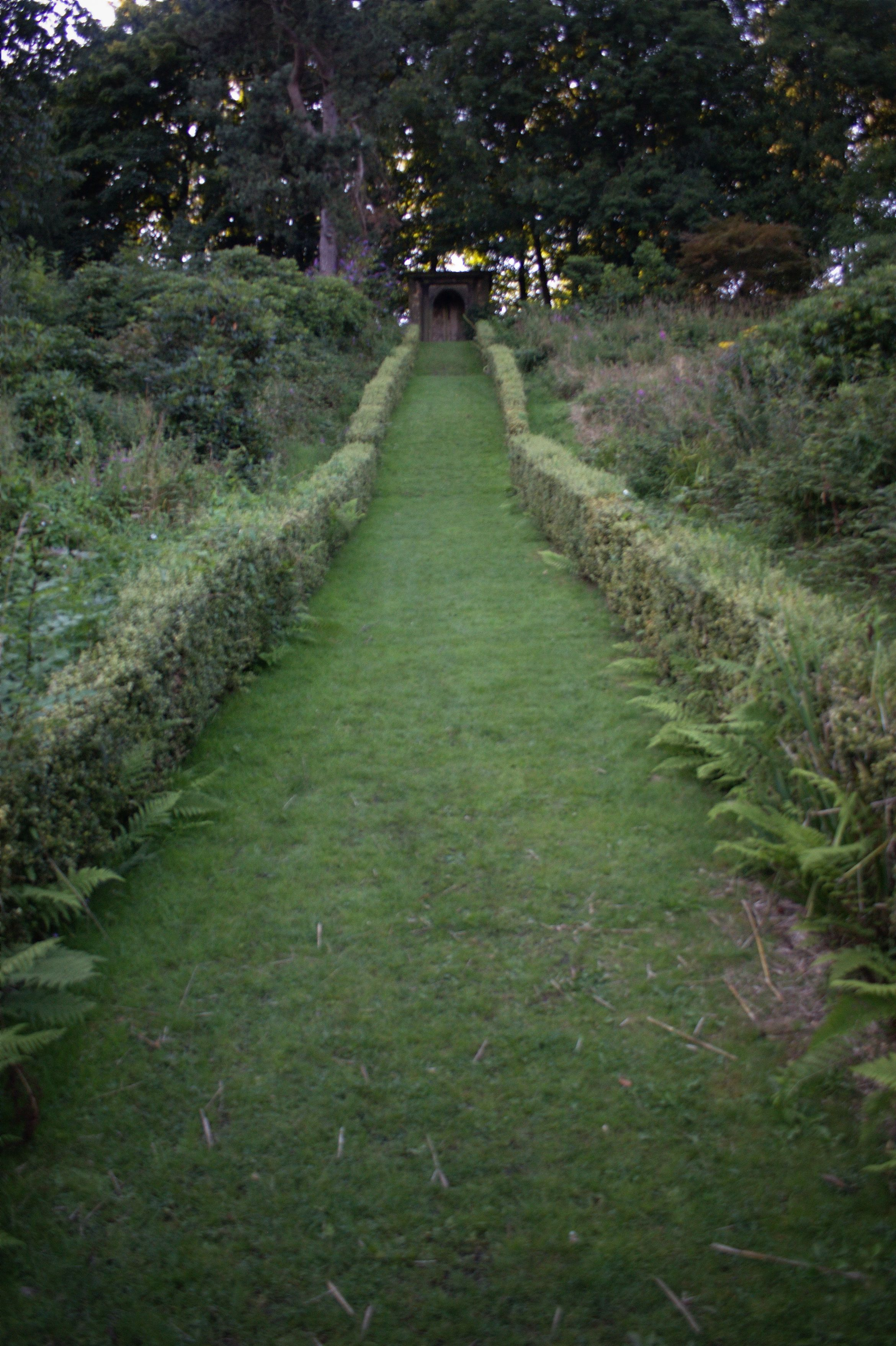
Grass Walk.

The Grass Walk was a grass staircase leading to a Garden Temple originally housing a marble statue carved in Rome in 1856.

== Current status ==
Some of the original buildings remain, such as the Grade II listed North Lodge and Grade II listed Conservatory, the Park Hall, and some of the staff accommodation and stables area. The original house occupied by the Philips family was demolished in 1950. In 1998 a restoration plan for the park was commissioned by Bury Council, funded by the Heritage Lottery Fund. A year later Philips Park was de-listed from the English Heritage Register of Parks and Gardens of Special Historic Interest in England due to deterioration. The park is currently subject to a £4m five-year plan to regenerate the area.

In 2009 the Friends of Prestwich Forest Park successfully applied for a grant which, along with funding from Bury Metropolitan Borough Council, was used to clear Cobster Field. The field was a large expanse of grazing ground, the purpose of which was to impress visitors as their carriages came down the drive to the Philips' mansion but when the M62 motorway was built the field had been covered with subsoil and was reverting to woodland. The money was used to clear the field, reseed with grass, and reinstate the views down the Irwell Valley to Manchester city centre.

== Access ==
Vehicular access to the park is by Park Lane, northwest of Junction 17 of the M60 motorway. The North Lodge of the park is located on the junction of Park lane and Philips Park Road. The lane crosses the motorway over a bridge. Access is also possible by foot or cycle by the multitude of old roads and trails around the park perimeter.

== See also ==
- Clifton Viaduct
- Clifton Aqueduct
- Irwell Valley
