= Middlewood Locks =

UK waterside development

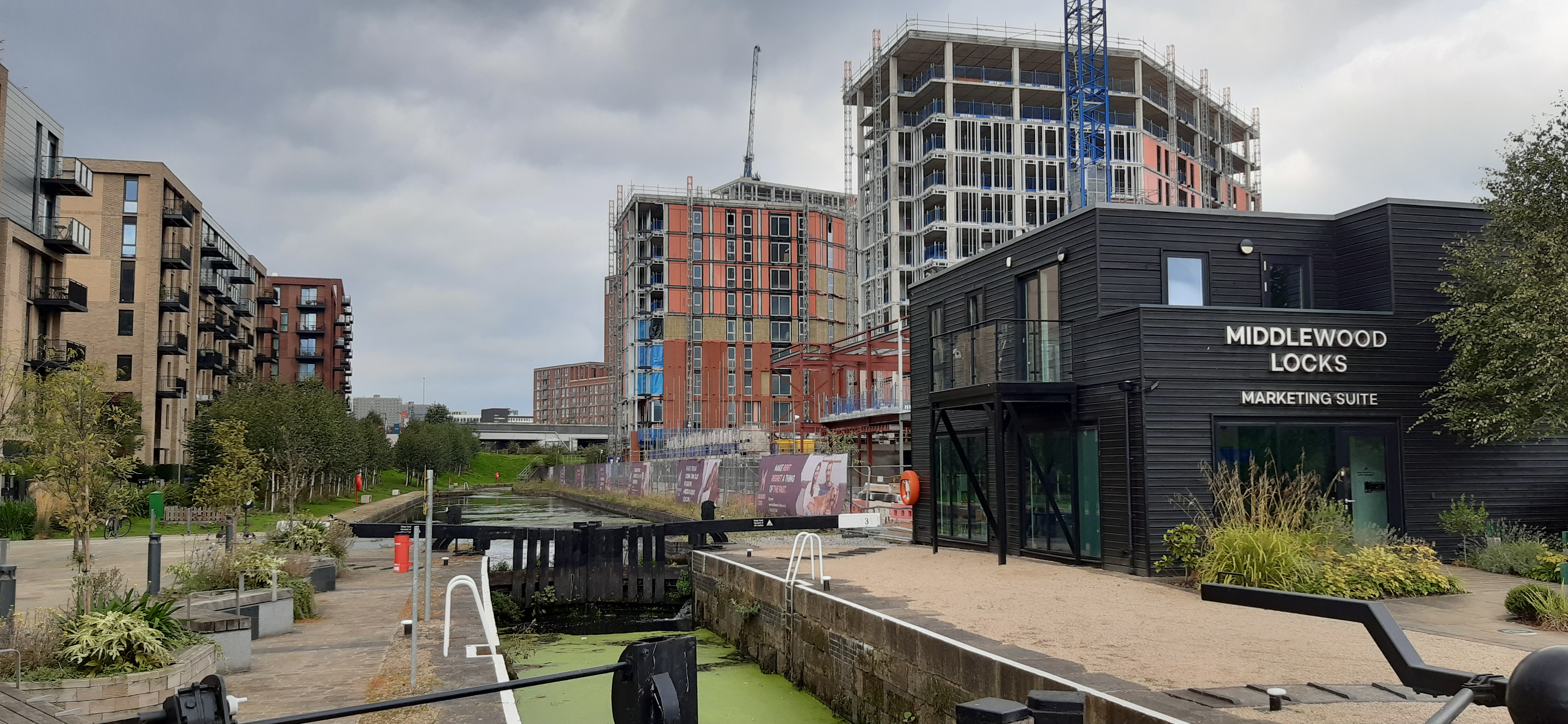
View of Lock 3 of the Manchester, Bolton and Bury Canal, and the Middlewood Locks building site in the background, September 2023

Middlewood Locks is a £700m waterside development under construction in Salford, Greater Manchester, England. The locks in the title are the first locks on the Manchester, Bolton and Bury Canal, which has been partly restored through the site.

The site, which is close to Salford Central Station, will contain both residential and commercial property. In May 2016, construction work started on the first phase, which will contain 571 homes and shops, restaurants, and an extensive new public realm. Plans were submitted for the second phase in October 2016. The full scheme will provide around 2,000 new homes and more than 750,000 sq ft of commercial development space, including offices, hotels, shops, restaurants, a convenience store, and a gym.
