= Haslingden Canal =

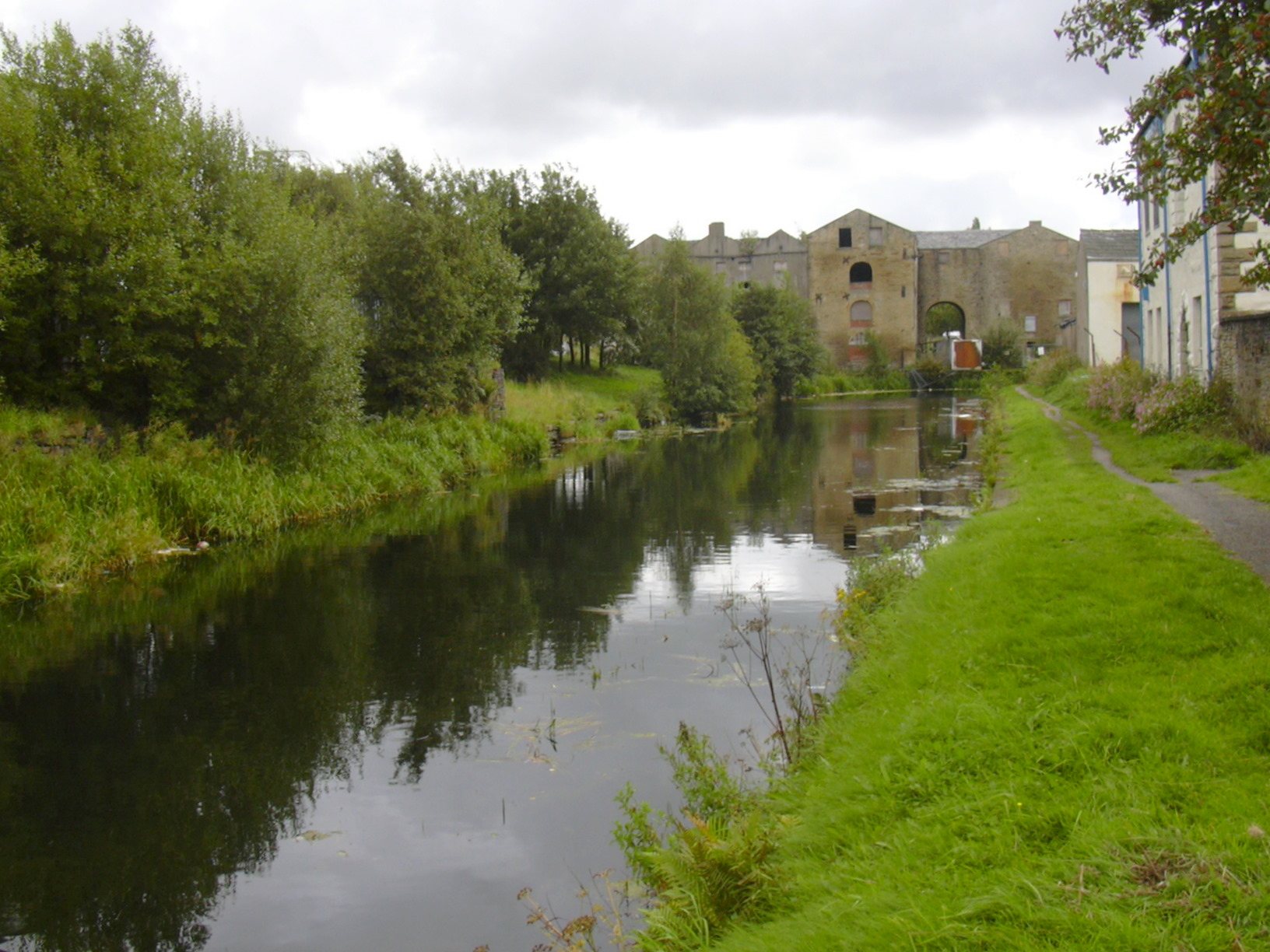
- The Leeds and Liverpool Canal near Church warehouse. The canal turns sharply to the right before it, and this may have been the proposed site for the junction with the Haslingden Canal.
- Interactive map of Haslingden Canal

Specifications
- Length: 13 miles (21 km)
- Status: Authorised but not built

History
- Date of act: 1794

Geography
- Start point: Bury
- End point: Church, near Accrington

The Haslingden Canal was a proposed canal link between the Bury arm of the Manchester, Bolton and Bury Canal in Greater Manchester, England, and the Leeds and Liverpool Canal in Accrington, England, passing through Haslingden. 53°42′N 2°18′W Authorised by an act of Parliament in 1794, the canal was not built.

The proposed canal would have been broad gauge, 13 miles (21 km) in length, and would have used an inclined plane in place of locks.

== History ==
The Leeds and Liverpool Canal had been authorised by the Leeds and Liverpool Canal Act 1770 (10 Geo. 3. c. 114), and by 1777, a long section at the eastern end from Leeds to Gargrave was open, as was another section at the western end from Wigan to Liverpool. There was then a pause until 1790, when work began again on the middle section, but its precise route was still under discussion. At the time, the Rochdale Canal was being promoted, which would provide an alternative crossing of the Pennines, and some of the shareholders were suggesting that the central section was therefore not necessary, and that the canal should be re-routed to serve towns in East Lancashire. In addition, the Lancaster Canal was being promoted, the southern section of which would cut across the route of the Leeds and Liverpool on its way from Preston to Westhoughton, while the Manchester, Bolton and Bury Canal were promoting an extension westwards from Bolton to Red Moss, to the south of Horwich, which would only be successful if the Leeds and Liverpool would connect to it. The Leeds and Liverpool instructed their engineers, Robert Whitworth and Joseph Priestley, to survey a branch to Red Moss.

There were suggestions that the Leeds and Liverpool should be linked to the Rochdale by building a branch between Burnley and Todmorden, and an increasing number of shareholders were convinced that the canal should be routed further east. Whitworth and Priestley presented a report, which outlined a plan to re-route the Newburgh to Bamber Bridge section through Duxbury, Red Moss, where there would be a junction with the Manchester Bolton & Bury Canal, Westhoughton, Hindley and Platt Bridge, where it would join the River Douglas Navigation. The disadvantage of the route was the need for locks to raise the level by 215 feet (66 m) to reach Red Moss, and a longer route via Burnley, Accrington and Blackburn was also considered. It was 12 miles (19 km) longer, but all on one level, and avoided the water supply problems likely with the Red Moss route.

In 1792, the Manchester, Bolton and Bury Canal Company proposed extending their Bury Branch to Rochdale, but agreed to drop the plan if the Leeds and Liverpool would build their line via Red Moss. The Leeds and Liverpool decided that a link to the Rochdale Canal would be better than an extension of the Bury Branch, and approved the East Lancashire diversion via Red Moss in February 1792. A bill to authorise it was presented to Parliament in 1793, but was defeated by the combined opposition of the Lancaster Canal and the Duke of Bridgewater.

Haslingden Canal Act 1794
- Act of Parliament
- Parliament of Great Britain
- Long title: An Act for making and maintaining a navigable canal from or nearly from Bury Bridge, in the parish of Bury, by Haslingden, to or nearly to Church Kirk, all in the county palatine of Lancaster.
- Citation: 34 Geo. 3. c. 77
- Territorial extent: Great Britain

Dates
- Royal assent: 4 April 1794
- Commencement: 4 April 1794 (Note: The Acts of Parliament (Commencement) Act 1793.)

Status: Current legislation

Text of statute as originally enacted

At this point, the Haslingden Canal was proposed, as an additional link between the Manchester Bolton & Bury Canal at Bury and the Leeds and Liverpool at Church, near Accrington. Engineers from both canals had decided it was feasible, and William Bennet had worked on the detailed design. It would be 13 miles (21 km) long, and have to rise by 400 feet (120 m) to reach the summit at Haslingden, which was an expanding manufacturing centre. An act of Parliament, the Haslingden Canal Act 1794 (34 Geo. 3. c. 77) was obtained by the promoters in April 1794, which failed to mention a junction with the Leeds and Liverpool Canal, even though the Leeds and Liverpool believed there would be one. There were severe restrictions on water supply and locks, and if agreement could not be reached with three-quarters of the millers and factories affected, changes in level were to be achieved by "rollers, racks, inclined planes, or any other works, engines or machinery, as a substitute for locks." The company had powers to raise £47,000 by issuing shares, and an additional £40,000 if required, either by issuing more shares or by mortgaging the tolls.

There was an attempt in July 1794 to engage millowners in a discussion about how alternatives to locks might work, but the project appears to have faded away after that. In 1797, the company was wound up, and the Red Moss scheme was also abandoned at the same time. Hadfield and Biddle have suggested that the scheme might have been a political move, rather than a genuine proposal. In 1805, the Leeds and Liverpool decided to press ahead with the line to Red Moss, but reported that the Manchester Bolton & Bury were no longer ready to do so, although that company kept no record of the event. In 1810, common sense prevailed, and the Leeds and Liverpool agreed to share the southern end of the Lancaster Canal between Johnson's Hillock and Kirkless, near Wigan. Concessions on tolls agreed between the companies meant that a link to the Manchester Bolton & Bury was unlikely to be built.

== See also ==
- Canals of the United Kingdom
- History of the British canal system

== Bibliography ==
- Hadfield, Charles; Biddle, Gordon (1970a). The Canals of North West England, Vol 1 (pp.1-236). David and Charles. ISBN 0-7153-4956-2.
- Hadfield, Charles; Biddle, Gordon (1970b). The Canals of North West England, Vol 2 (pp.241-496). David and Charles. ISBN 0-7153-4992-9.
- Nicholson (2006). Nicholson Guides Vol 5: North West & the Pennines. Harper Collins. ISBN 978-0-00-721113-5.
