= Clifton Aqueduct =

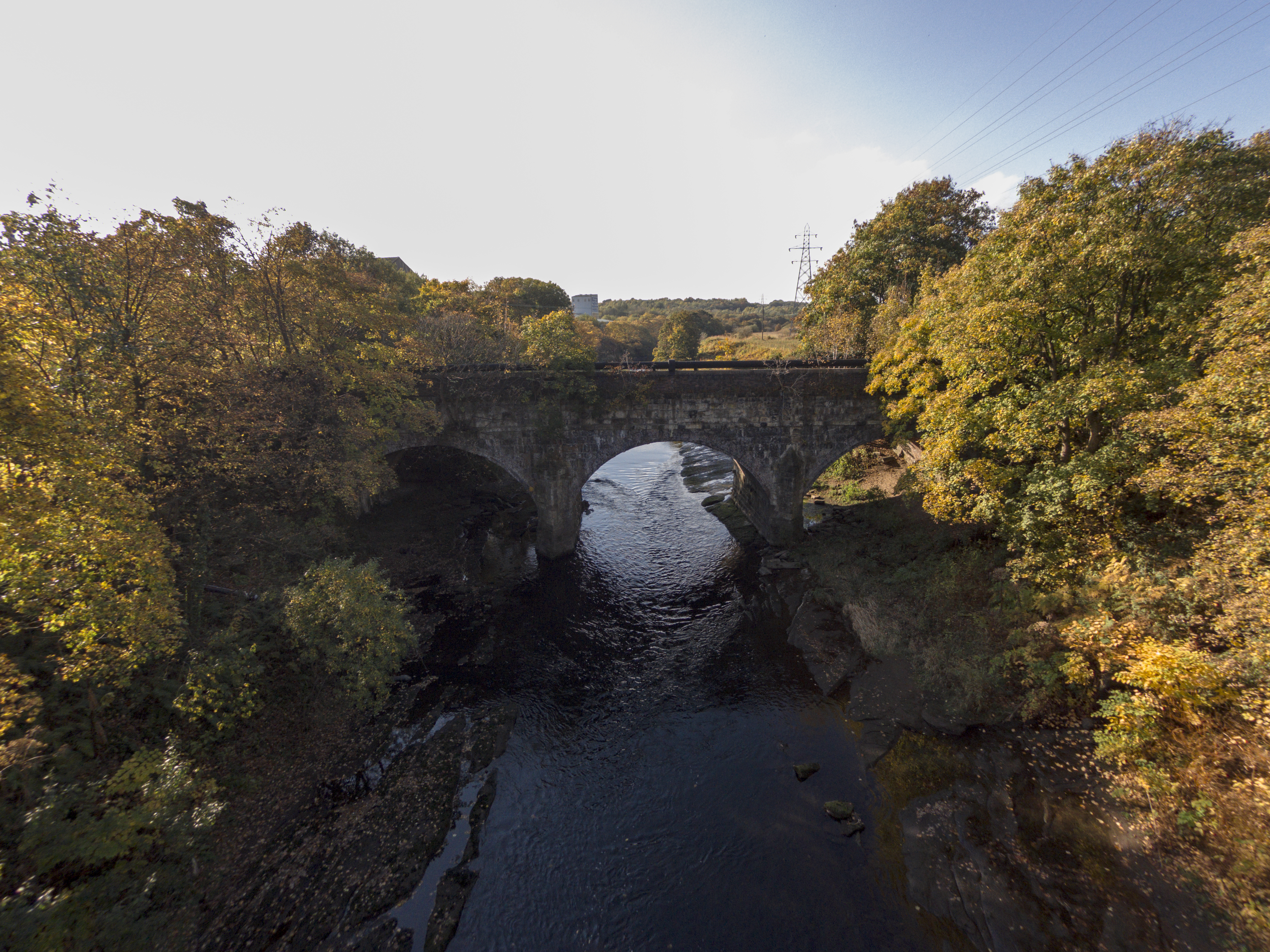
- The aqueduct spanning the Irwell, as viewed from the Clifton Viaduct downstream
- Coordinates: 53.5277°N 2.3172°W
- OS grid reference: SD790034
- Carries: Manchester, Bolton and Bury Canal
- Crosses: River Irwell
- Locale: Clifton, Greater Manchester
- Heritage status: Grade II

Characteristics
- Trough construction: Stone
- Pier construction: Brick
- Towpaths: Both
- No. of spans: Three

History
- Designer: Charles Roberts and John Nightingale
- Construction end: 1796

Clifton Aqueduct, built in 1796, carried the Manchester, Bolton and Bury Canal across the River Irwell in Clifton, near Manchester, England. It is preserved as a Grade II listed structure. The aqueduct is constructed of dressed stone with brick arches. Three segmental arches with keystones rest on triangular-ended cutwaters. Above the cutwaters are flat Pilasters. A C20 brick parapet remains on the eastern side. There is a towpath on each side, and the aqueduct contains grooves for stop planks to be inserted, to drain the canal. The aqueduct was engineered by Charles Roberts and John Nightingale.

The aqueduct is one of two remaining along the canal route, the other being Prestolee Aqueduct. The canal is undergoing restoration and was previously hoped to be in operation around 2020.

As of December 2020, the aqueduct is currently not in water. The canal is very overgrown and showing signs of severe deterioration.

== Rail access ==
The nearest station is Clifton (Manchester) railway station.

== See also ==
- Listed buildings in Swinton and Pendlebury
- Canals of the United Kingdom
- History of the British canal system
