= Manchester, Bolton and Bury Canal =

Canal in Greater Manchester, England

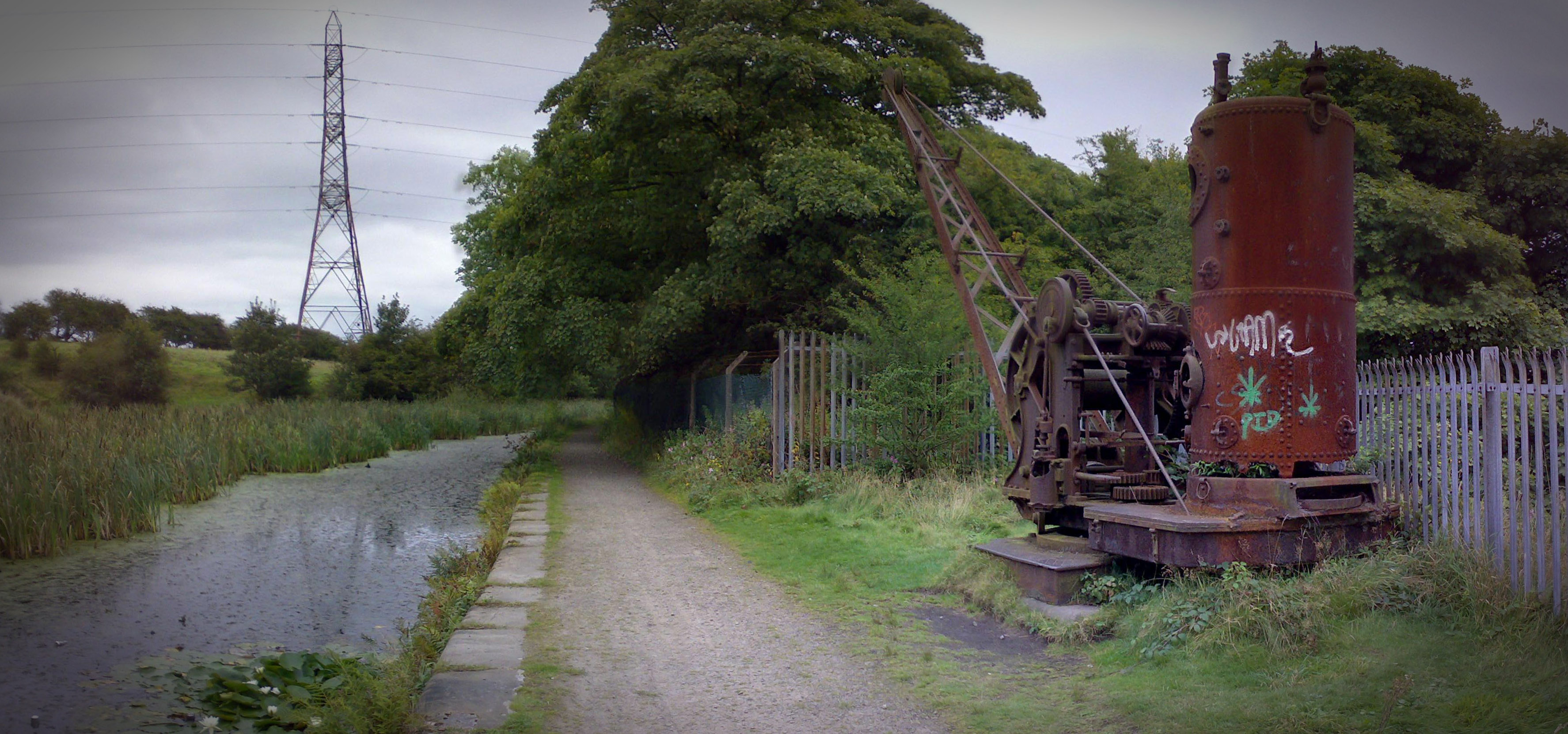
- The Grade II listed steam crane at Mount Sion, on the Bury arm

Specifications
- Maximum boat length: 68 ft 0 in (20.73 m)
- Maximum boat beam: 14 ft 2 in (4.32 m) (originally 7 ft 0 in or 2.13 m) (Widened from 1794)
- Locks: 16 (originally 12 and later 17) (5 added for Irwell extension making 17 total, as of 2008 a single deep lock has replaced locks 1&2)
- Maximum height AMSL: 247 ft (75 m)
- Status: Under restoration
- Navigation authority: Canal and River Trust

History
- Original owner: Manchester, Bolton and Bury Canal Company
- Principal engineer: Matthew Fletcher
- Other engineers: Hugh Henshall, Charles Roberts, John Nightingale
- Date of act: 1791
- Date of first use: 1797
- Date completed: 1808; 218 years ago
- Date closed: 1924, 1941, 1961

Geography
- Start point: River Irwell, Salford (originally Oldfield Road, Salford)
- End point: Bury and Bolton
- Branch: Fletcher's Canal

The Manchester, Bolton and Bury Canal is a disused canal in Greater Manchester, England, built to link Bolton and Bury with Manchester. The canal, when fully opened, was 15 miles 1 furlong (24 km) long. It was accessed via a junction with the River Irwell in Salford. Seventeen locks were required to climb to the summit as it passed through Pendleton, heading northwest to Prestolee before it split northwest to Bolton and northeast to Bury. Between Bolton and Bury the canal was level and required no locks. Six aqueducts were built to allow the canal to cross the rivers Irwell and Tonge and several minor roads.

The canal was commissioned in 1791 by local landowners and businessmen and built between 1791 and 1808, during the Golden Age of canal building, at a cost of £127,700 (£9.7 million today). Originally designed for narrow gauge boats, during its construction the canal was altered into a broad gauge canal to allow an ultimately unrealised connection with the Leeds and Liverpool Canal. The canal company later converted into a railway company and built a railway line close to the canal's path, which required modifications to the Salford arm of the canal.

Most of the freight carried was coal from local collieries but, as the mines reached the end of their working lives sections of the canal fell into disuse and disrepair and it was officially abandoned in 1961. In 1987 a society was formed with the aim of restoring the canal for leisure use and, in 2006, restoration began in the area around the junction with the River Irwell in Salford. The canal is currently navigable as far as Oldfield Road, Salford.

The September 2008 opening ceremony in Salford

== History ==
=== Proposal ===
The local geology of the Irwell Valley, which included steep sided valleys with fast flowing rivers subject to rapid flooding and dry seasons, confined local river transport to the Mersey and Irwell Navigation, west of Manchester. Financial unrest and British involvement in the American Revolutionary War restricted local transport investment to road improvements.

With the arrival of more favourable conditions, including the end of the war, a proposal for a canal to link the towns of Manchester, Bolton and Bury was mooted. Matthew Fletcher had in 1789 been employed as a technical advisor and had surveyed the route of the proposed canal, but the first public notice came from Manchester on 4 September 1790. (Note: The sponsors were not indicated) The initial proposal probably came from a group in Bolton, with the support of the Mersey and Irwell Navigation Company. A meeting was "intended to be holden at the House of Mr Shawe, the Bull's Head in Manchester aforesaid, on Monday, the twentieth day of this instant, September, at eleven o'clock in the forenoon", where "Surveys, Plans, Levels, Estimates and Proposals" would be presented. A further meeting on 16 September, held in Bolton, appointed a committee of six Boltonians chaired by Lord Grey de Wilton to attend at Manchester. A series of resolutions at this meeting followed a discussion of the route, and authorised the necessary actions to bring the plan into fruition, which included the petitioning of Parliament for the required bill. Hugh Henshall was asked to survey the proposed route of the canal.

For local industries along the route of the proposed canal, whose operations relied on water from local rivers and brooks which the canal might also use, its construction was a controversial idea. At a meeting in Bolton on 4 October 1790, it was resolved that "proper clauses be inserted in the bill to prevent injury to owners of mills". A meeting in Bury at the Eagle & Child public house on 29 September 1790 secured an agreement that "the utility of this scheme nevertheless cannot with propriety be ascertained until such time as it has been certified, from whence and in what proportion the proprietors of the intended navigation expect to draw their resources of water". At another meeting in Bury, on 13 October 1790, Hugh Henshall gave a written report on the canal, and stated that his plan would not require water from the river in times of drought, but that floods and rivulets would supply his reservoirs. He suggested that mill owners could be protected by a suitable clause in the bill, and such a clause was duly obtained by Robert Peel. Businesses in Bolton were concerned with the location of the canal terminus, and proposed the construction of a tunnel to allow the terminus to be built closer to the town centre. Ralph Fletcher, spokesman for those concerned, reported on this proposal to the committee, although no tunnel was built.

=== Subscribers and funding ===
A document entitled "A list of subscribers to the intended Bolton Bury and Manchester Canal Navigation", now kept in the Greater Manchester County Record Office, lists notable subscribers including the Earl of Derby, Lord Grey de Wilton, Matthew Fletcher, and Robert Peel. The 95 investments ranged from £100 to £3,000, and many were made by proxy. The total sum of investments was £47,700; £5 per £100 share was initially paid, with an additional £10 call made by 10 August 1791. Similar share calls were made at regular intervals over the following years. The first dividend of 4% was paid in July 1812, with regular payments following thereafter.

=== Work begins ===
Following a parliamentary survey of the route by Charles McNiven, the bill received royal assent on 13 May 1791 and became an act of Parliament, the Manchester, Bolton and Bury Canal Act 1791 (31 Geo. 3. c. 68), for the construction of the canal, by which "the proprietors were empowered to purchase land for a breadth of 26 yards on level ground, and wider where required for cuttings or embankments." The act allowed the company to raise £47,000, with shares of £100. The intention was that at Prestolee the route would divide into two branches (arms), with one branch towards Bolton and the other to Bury, but it would not, however, join the River Irwell. The proprietors were entitled to take water from any brooks within 1,000 yards (910 m) of the canal, or within 3 miles (4.8 km) of the canal summits at Bolton and Bury.

At a meeting in Manchester on 30 June 1791, at the house of Alexander Patten, a committee was formed with the following members:

1. Lord Grey de Wilton, Heaton House, Lancashire
2. Sir John Edensor Heathcote, Longton, Newcastle, Staffordshire
3. Thomas Butterworth Bayley esq. — Hope, Salford
4. Robert Andrews esq — Rivington
5. James Wareing, Gentleman, Knowsley
6. Matthew Fletcher (Mine owner, Clifton)
7. Peter Wright, Gentleman, Manchester
8. William Marsden, Merchant, Manchester
9. Charles McNiven, Gentleman, Manchester
10. Hugh Henshall, Longpost, Staffordshire
11. John Pilkington, Merchant, Manchester

The meeting secured a resolution that "Matthew Fletcher and Mr McNiven shall dispatch or procure 100 wheelbarrows and as many planks as they shall think necessary for the use and accommodation of the canal navigation". Further meetings took place from 26 to 29 July. Matthew Fletcher was ordered to meet with land owners to discuss the purchase of any land along the route of the canal, and with this in mind, on 30 July 1791 John Seddon of Sandy Lane was ordered to survey the line of the canal beginning within the estate of John Edenson Heathcote, and ending at the southern extremity of the Reverend Dauntesey's estate. Fletcher and Henshall were ordered to contact people and companies in the building trade to discuss construction.

At a meeting on 16 August 1791, "several persons" attended, and made offers for the contract to build the canal. A Mr John Seddon of Little Hulton, a labourer, agreed to a contract on Matthew Fletcher's terms, for a "certain part of the canal". Five other persons were rejected, their proposals not receiving the "approbation" of the committee.

With news of the planned Rochdale Canal link into Manchester, the company proposed to extend the canal from Bury through Littleborough, and to connect with the Rochdale Canal at Sladen. The new route, known as the Bury and Sladen Canal, was intended as a rival scheme to the proposed Rochdale link into Manchester. A survey was also carried out on a proposed extension from Sladen to Sowerby Bridge. The company also considered links to the Leeds and Liverpool Canal and the Mersey and Irwell Navigation. These plans would have substantially increased the trans-Pennine traffic using the company's canal, and caused a potential loss of traffic and revenue on the nearby Bridgewater Canal. With this in mind, the owner of the Bridgewater Canal, the Duke of Bridgewater, agreed to allow the Rochdale Canal Company to connect to his canal at Manchester. Despite the persistence of the canal company, the Rochdale Canal plan won the day and in 1797 the company abandoned the Bury and Sladen Canal plan.

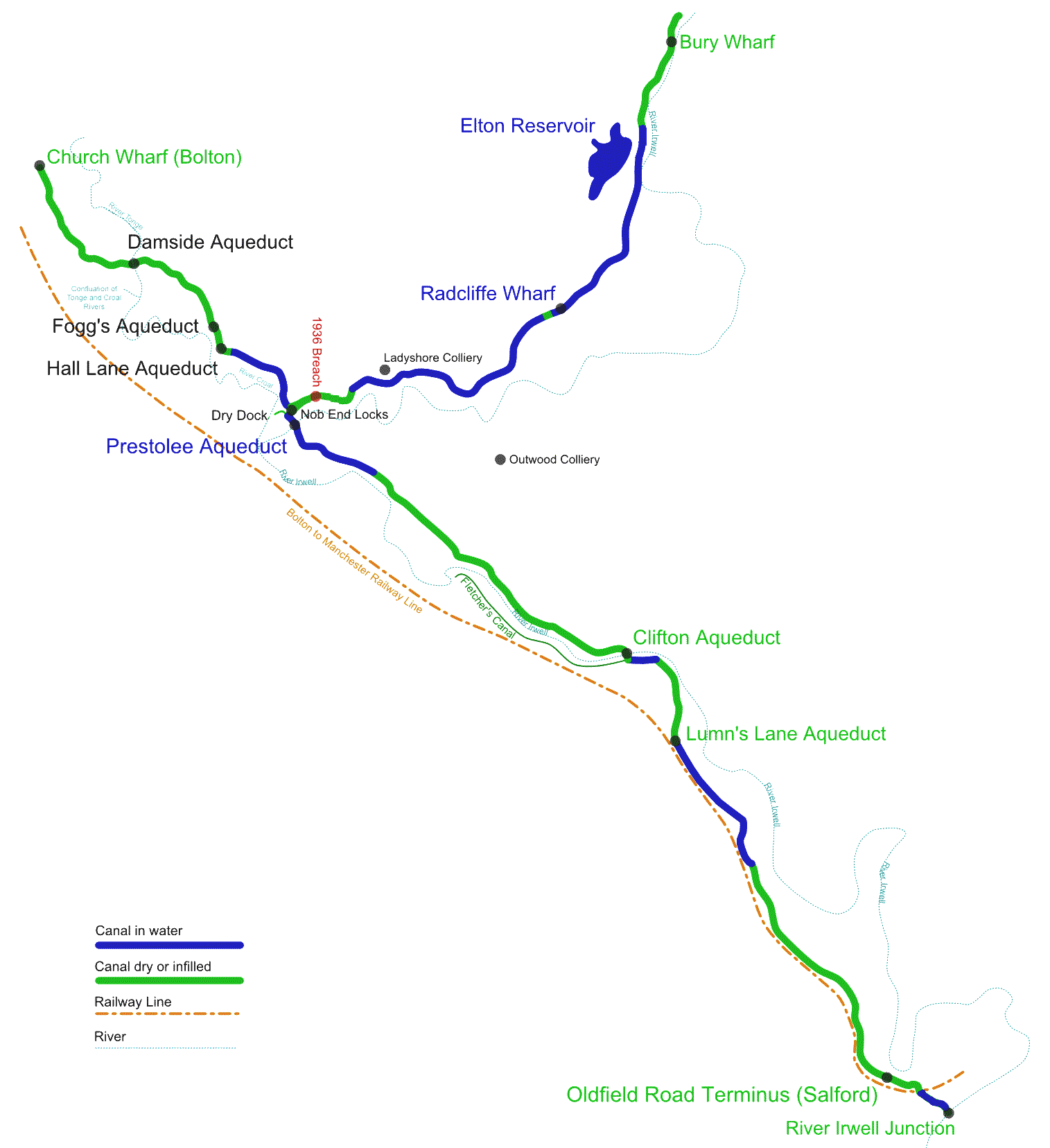
Map of the canal showing features and sections with/without water.

After several years of construction, on 9 January 1794 an agreement was reached with the Leeds and Liverpool Canal Company to create a link from the Bolton arm of the canal to the Leeds and Liverpool Canal at Red Moss, near Horwich. This agreement required significant design changes to allow the canal to carry the wider boats used on the broad gauge Leeds and Liverpool Canal, which included a change to broad locks. Benjamin Outram was employed to inspect the works, and reported on the cost of this conversion as being £26,924. Although the necessary changes were implemented, the route of the Leeds and Liverpool Canal was altered and the link was not built. In the same year the Haslingden Canal link to the Leeds and Liverpool Canal was proposed, from the Bury arm of the canal. Although authorised by Haslingden Canal Act 1794 (34 Geo. 3. c. 77), it too was never built. The canal company remained hopeful of a link between the two canals, but all hope of this was lost when on 21 June 1819 the Leeds and Liverpool Canal Branch and Railway Act 1819 (59 Geo. 3. c. cv) was enacted to create a link between the Leigh extension of the Bridgewater Canal, and the Leeds and Liverpool Canal.

A report entitled "A Statement of the Situation of the Works of the Manchester, Bolton and Bury Canal, on the Eighteenth of December, 1795." gives details of the progress of the works, including details of bridges, cuttings, raised bankings and aqueducts. Much of the document details the work required to convert the canal to broad gauge. A 5.75-mile (9.25 km) length between Oldfield Lane in Salford and Giants Seat Locks in Outwood was navigable with 3 feet 8 inches (1.12 m) of water. The remaining work included strengthening work to the banks, an increase of water depth to 5 feet (1.5 m), and the gravelling of half of the towpath. Between Giants Seat locks and Ringley Bridge two locks had been erected, with a small section of canal to be broadened before becoming navigable. From Ringley Bridge to Prestolee Aqueduct one lock had been erected. Nob End Locks were still under construction but mostly complete, although the basin at the bottom had not yet been dug. The stretch to Bolton had at this time been widened, with several bridges requiring further work, incomplete embankments, construction of a weir, and gravelling of the towpath. On the Bury arm, almost the entire length had been dug, and walls to support the canal along the bank of the Irwell had been built. Some widening of previously narrow sections had yet to be undertaken, none of the towpath had been gravelled, and no fences had been erected along the towpath.

Significant parts of the canal were completed by 1796, including the stretch up to Bury in October of that year. With the completion of the Bolton arm in the following year, much of the canal opened for business. The connection to Fletcher's Canal was completed in 1800, but with the failure of the scheme to connect the Bolton arm of the canal to the Leeds and Liverpool Canal, the canal remained isolated from any other navigable waterway. One proposed remedy involved the construction of an aqueduct over the River Irwell in Manchester, to connect directly to the Rochdale Canal between Castlefield and Piccadilly. A bill was proposed in 1799 but after strong objections from the Mersey and Irwell Navigation Company they eventually gave up and subsequently, over the following seven years, the canal company purchased enough land to build a canal link directly to the Irwell.

Manchester, Bolton and Bury Canal Act 1805
- Act of Parliament
- Parliament of the United Kingdom
- Long title: An Act to enable the Company of Proprietors of the Canal Navigation from Manchester to Bolton and to Bury, to raise Money to complete the same.
- Citation: 45 Geo. 3. c. iv

Dates
- Royal assent: 12 March 1805
Other legislation
| Repealed by | Manchester, Bolton and Bury Canal and Railway Act 1831 |

Status: Repealed

During construction the company, having spent all of the money allowed in the Manchester, Bolton and Bury Canal Act 1791, incurred a debt of £31,345. They therefore applied for a further act of Parliament to raise more money. This act, the Manchester, Bolton and Bury Canal Act 1805 (45 Geo. 3. c. iv), allowed them to raise an additional £80,000. This allowed them to repay the debt, and continue work to finish the canal. An inspection in June 1808 reported that by November 1808 the canal would be complete throughout.

A connection to the Rochdale Canal was eventually built in 1839 via the Manchester and Salford Junction Canal, which was funded in part by the proprietors of the MB&B canal.

=== Traffic ===
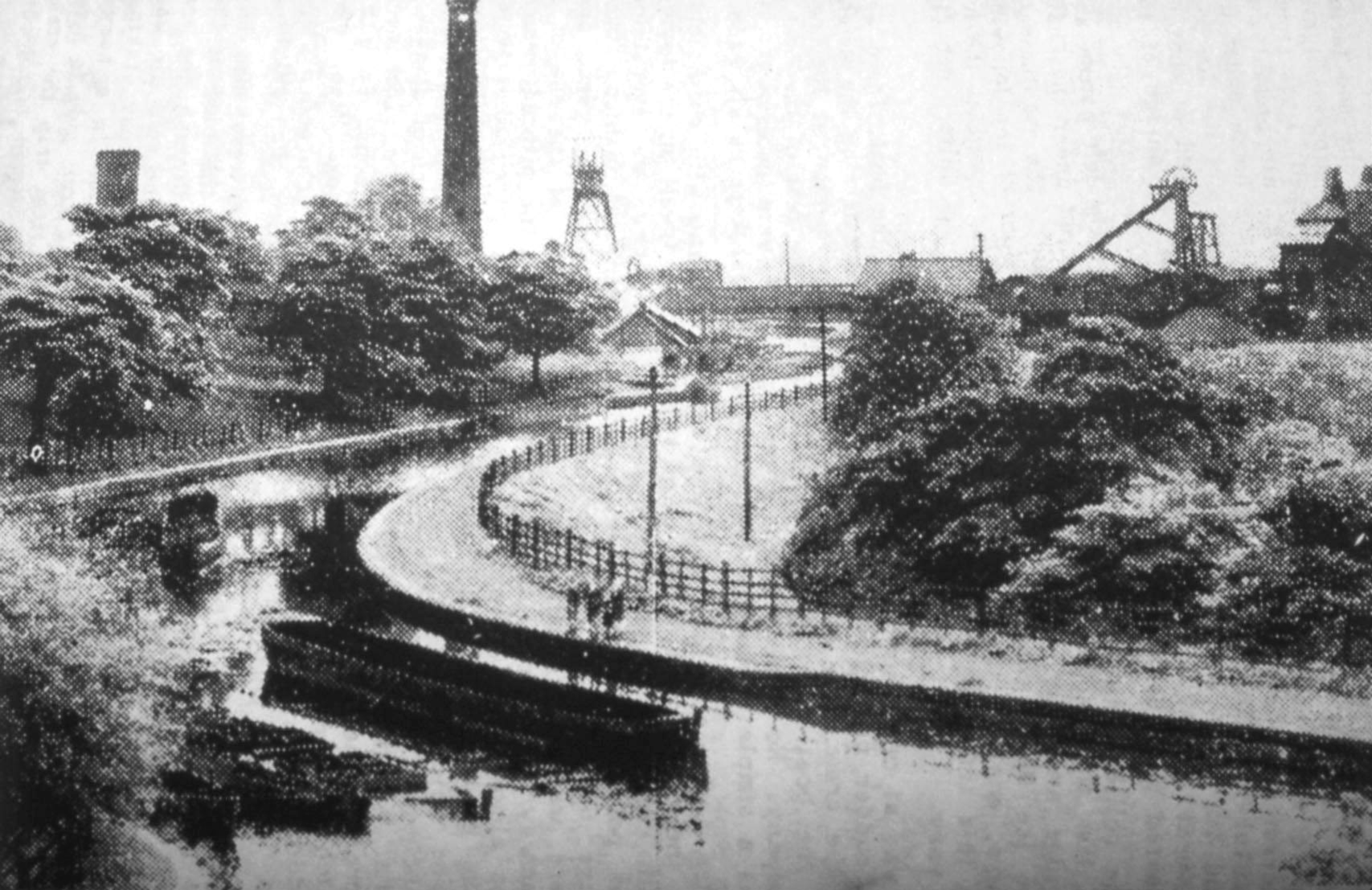
Ladyshore Colliery

Most of the traffic along the canal transported coal from the many collieries that existed along its length, such as Outwood Colliery and Ladyshore Colliery. Some of these pits were linked to the canal by road, and some by short tramlines. In the late 19th century as much as 650,000 metric tons (640,000 long tons) of coal and 43,000 metric tons (42,000 long tons) of other materials including night soil and fruit were transported annually. The canal also enabled the transport of salt from Cheshire to the many bleach and dye works in its area – hence the name of Salt Wharf on the Bolton arm of the canal. Tolls were easily calculated as milestones were placed along the towpath at 1/4 mile (400 m) intervals. This was important as journeys were often quite short, the collieries being so close to industry along the canal's length.

The boats used to transport coal were short and narrow, and each contained a row of boxes used for carrying coal. Each box had a base of two halves, hinged and held closed with chains. These boxes would be lifted out of the boats, positioned by crane over a bunker or cart and emptied by releasing the chains on the base. This design helped keep the canal competitive, as it increased the speed with which loading and unloading of the boats could be performed.

The canal would often freeze in winter, so an icebreaker was used to ensure the canal remained navigable during the cold weather. Named "Sarah Lansdale" and owned by James Crompton Paperworks, it was towed by a team of horses while the crew stood astride the deck, secured to the handrails, rocking the boat from side to side and breaking the ice in the process. Often, ice would be encountered that was so thick the boat would rise up onto the surface of the ice. This boat did once reside at the boat museum in Ellesmere Port Dock but was later destroyed by fire.

Food and drink was made available to those using the canal in several places including Margaret Barlow's Tea Gardens, Kilcoby Cottage and Rhodes Lock. A camping ground was also available at Kilcoby Cottage. The nearby Giant's Seat House was for some time the home of the canal manager.

The canal also carried packet services, with passengers facing a three-hour journey between Bolton and Manchester. The first passenger boat to Bolton was launched in 1796 from the Windsor Castle public house, and in 1798 a new packet boat was built for the use of the company. Fares were initially fixed by the canal company (although from 1805 contracted-out) and based upon the service required; a passenger using the state cabin from Bolton to Manchester would be charged one shilling six pence, and a single shilling on the return journey. Passengers would change boats at Prestolee to avoid delays at the lock flight and also to save water, and a purpose-built covered walkway the length of the road was constructed for their benefit. Another passenger service ran along the two arms from Bolton to Bury, and over 60,000 passengers per year travelled on the canal; between July 1833 and June 1834, 21,060 made the journey from Bolton to Manchester, 21,212 people travelled from Manchester to Bolton, and 20,818 intermediary passengers hopped on and off the boats en route. In 1834 the Bolton to Manchester service earned £1,177 and the Bolton to Bury service earned £75. The service was quite luxurious compared to some packet boat services: central heating was provided in winter and drinks were served on board. This caused a tragedy in 1818, however, when a party of twenty drunken passengers managed to capsize the boat and a number of passengers, including two children, were drowned.

Several fatal incidents combined with general passenger concern caused the canal company to improve passenger safety; in 1802 a wall was built at the wharf at Oldfield Lane in Salford and in 1833 a gas lamp was installed at Ringley Wharf.

A parcel service was also offered, although this proved unpopular as it was unreliable.

=== Railway proposal ===
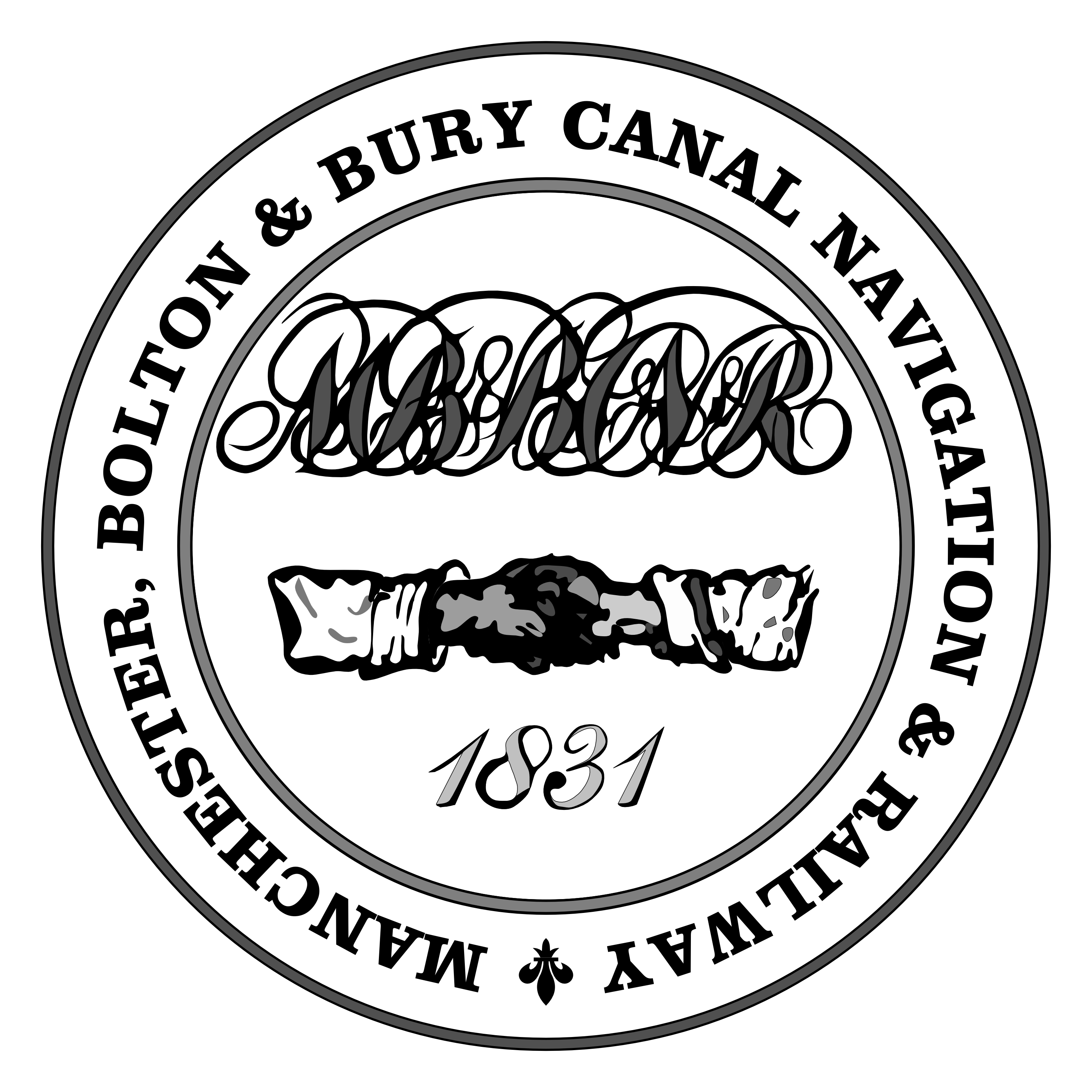
The seal of the Manchester, Bolton and Bury Canal Navigation and Railway Company

In March 1829 the idea of building a branch railway line from the Oldfield Road terminus in Salford to the new Liverpool and Manchester Railway was mooted, but nothing was built. In 1830 the canal company, led by chairman Sir John Tobin, began to promote a proposal to build a railway along the line of the canal, from Salford to Bolton. Alexander Nimmo was employed to report on the proposal and told that it was possible "so far as he expressed himself capable of judging from his present cursory view of the canal". The shareholders then sought a bill for a railway from Bolton to Manchester and on 23 August 1831 obtained an act of Parliament, the Manchester, Bolton and Bury Canal and Railway Act 1831 (1 & 2 Will. 4. c. lx), to become the "Company of Proprietors of the Manchester, Bolton and Bury Canal Navigation and Railway Company". They were empowered to build a line from Manchester to Bolton and Bury, "upon or near the line of ... the Canal", and a branch from Clifton Aqueduct through to Great Lever. In 1832 this company obtained another act of Parliament, the Manchester, Bolton and Bury Canal and Railway Act 1832 (2 & 3 Will. 4. c. lxix), that allowed it to build the railway. Due mainly to the objections of local mine owners who would have lost access to the canal and supplies, and would not have had branch railways built for them, the company agreed to an amending bill which would keep the canal and allow the new railway to be constructed alongside it. Due to technical and financial constraints the branch to Bury was never built. The canal therefore survived, although locks 4 and 5 in Salford were moved and combined into a two-rise staircase, with a second tunnel built underneath the line which became known as the Manchester and Bolton Railway.

Manchester and Leeds Railway (Manchester, Bolton and Bury Canal and Railway) Act 1846
- Act of Parliament
- Parliament of the United Kingdom
- Long title: An Act to incorporate the Company of Proprietors of the Manchester, Bolton, and Bury Canal Navigation and Railway with the Manchester and Leeds Railway Company.
- Citation: 9 & 10 Vict. c. ccclxxviii

Dates
- Royal assent: 18 August 1846

Text of statute as originally enacted

The line opened on 28 May 1838, and the company had purchased four locomotives from Bury, Curtis, and Kennedy, two from George Forrester and Company, and two from William Fairbairn & Sons. Between the opening date and 9 January 1839 the railway carried 228,799 passengers – far more than had been carried on the canal. Shortly thereafter passenger services on the canal ceased and the boats were sold off. In 1846 the company was taken over by the Manchester and Leeds Railway, which itself became the Lancashire and Yorkshire Railway (L&YR) the following year. In 1890 the L&YR widened the line through Salford. Locks 4, 5 and 6 were moved slightly to the north and the tunnel under the railway was replaced by a bridge (although it is still referred to as a tunnel).

In 1922 the L&YR amalgamated into the London and North Western Railway, and in 1923 this company amalgamated into the London, Midland and Scottish Railway. This company was nationalised in 1948 under the Transport Act 1947 and became part of British Railways.

=== Decline ===
By 1924 the Bolton arm had experienced a significant fall in traffic, although until the 1930s, when colliery closures reduced traffic even further, coal trade remained brisk. By 1935 Fletcher's Canal had fallen into disuse. Burst banks alongside the Irwell and Croal rivers (caused largely by subsidence from mining activities) were common. A major breach occurred in 1936 and was never repaired. 10.45 acres (42,300 m^{2}) of land around this breach was purchased from the British Transport Commission by Cream's Paper Mill, who subsequently built over part of the canal.

On 2 March 1937 the London, Midland and Scottish Railway held a special general meeting during which they proposed to abandon the canal from Clifton Aqueduct to Bailey Bridge, from Bailey Bridge to Bury, and the entire Bolton arm from Nob End Locks to Bolton. The proposal was not carried but four years later, under the London, Midland and Scottish Railway Act 1941 (4 & 5 Geo. 6. c. xii), they abandoned 7 miles (11 km) of the canal, including a section from Prestolee to Clifton and the entire Bolton arm. In 1939, during the Second World War, the Ministry of Transport ordered a half-mile section in Agecroft piped, to reduce the risk of German bomb damage damaging the adjacent Magnesium Elektron Company's site.

Although it continued to generate revenue from the sale of water, tolls produced only a small proportion of the canal's income. In 1946, against expenses of £12,500, it earned a total of £7,296, of which only £471 was from tolls. In 1951 total income was £8,815 against a total expenditure of £9,574. In the same year, the canal carried 3,933 long tons (3,996 t) of coal and no other materials.

A British Transport Commission report of 1955 included the canal in its list of "Waterways having insufficient commercial prospects to justify their retention for navigation". Following the British Transport Commission Act 1961 (9 & 10 Eliz. 2. c. xxxvi) the canal was abandoned. A single coal delivery service between Sion Street and Bury Moors continued until 1968, but this was the last commercial traffic to use the canal.

== Features ==
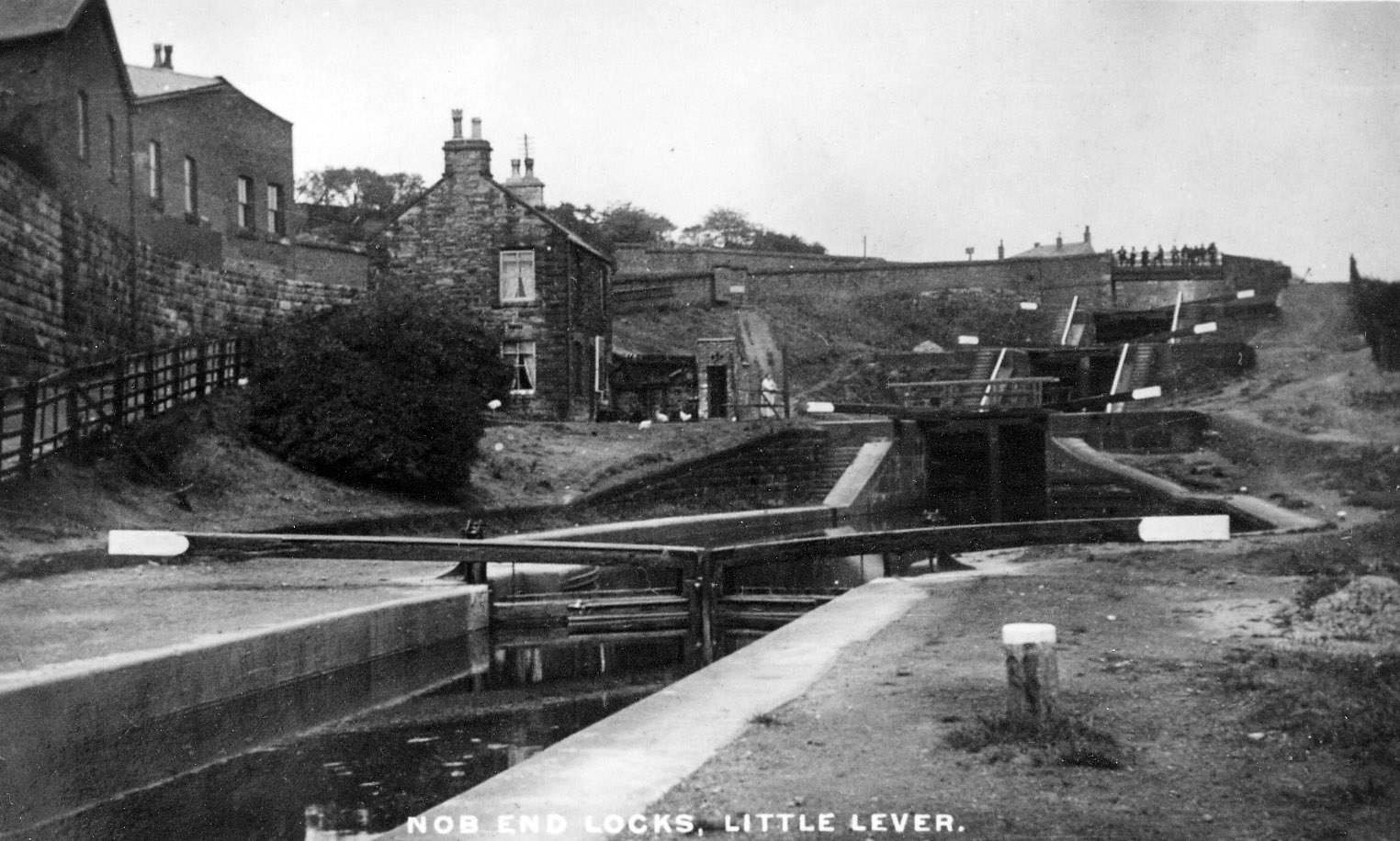
Nob End Locks in operation

There are several notable features along the canal, including Prestolee Aqueduct and Clifton Aqueduct, both of which are Grade II listed structures. Nob End Locks (sometimes referred to as Prestolee Locks) sit at the junction of the three arms of the canal at Nob End. They comprise two sets of three staircase locks, separated by a passing basin. These locks served to lower the level of the canal by 64 feet (20 m) over a distance of 600 feet (183 m). The upper staircase is still visible, but most of the lower staircase was filled in at some point in the 1950s, and much of the stonework was removed.

A major breach of the canal along the Bury arm revealed the scale of the engineering used in the construction of the retaining wall. Railway rails, which were used to increase the strength of the walls, are still clearly visible at the site of the breach.

The Mount Sion steam crane (a depiction of which is used as the logo of the Manchester Bolton & Bury Canal Society) sits rusting and unused at Mount Sion, on the Bury arm. One of the earliest surviving cranes in England, it was built some time about 1875–1884 for Mount Sion Bleach Works by Thomas Smith & Sons of Rodley and was used to unload coal boxes from barges into the yard below the canal. It was granted Grade II listed status in 2011.

== Design and construction ==
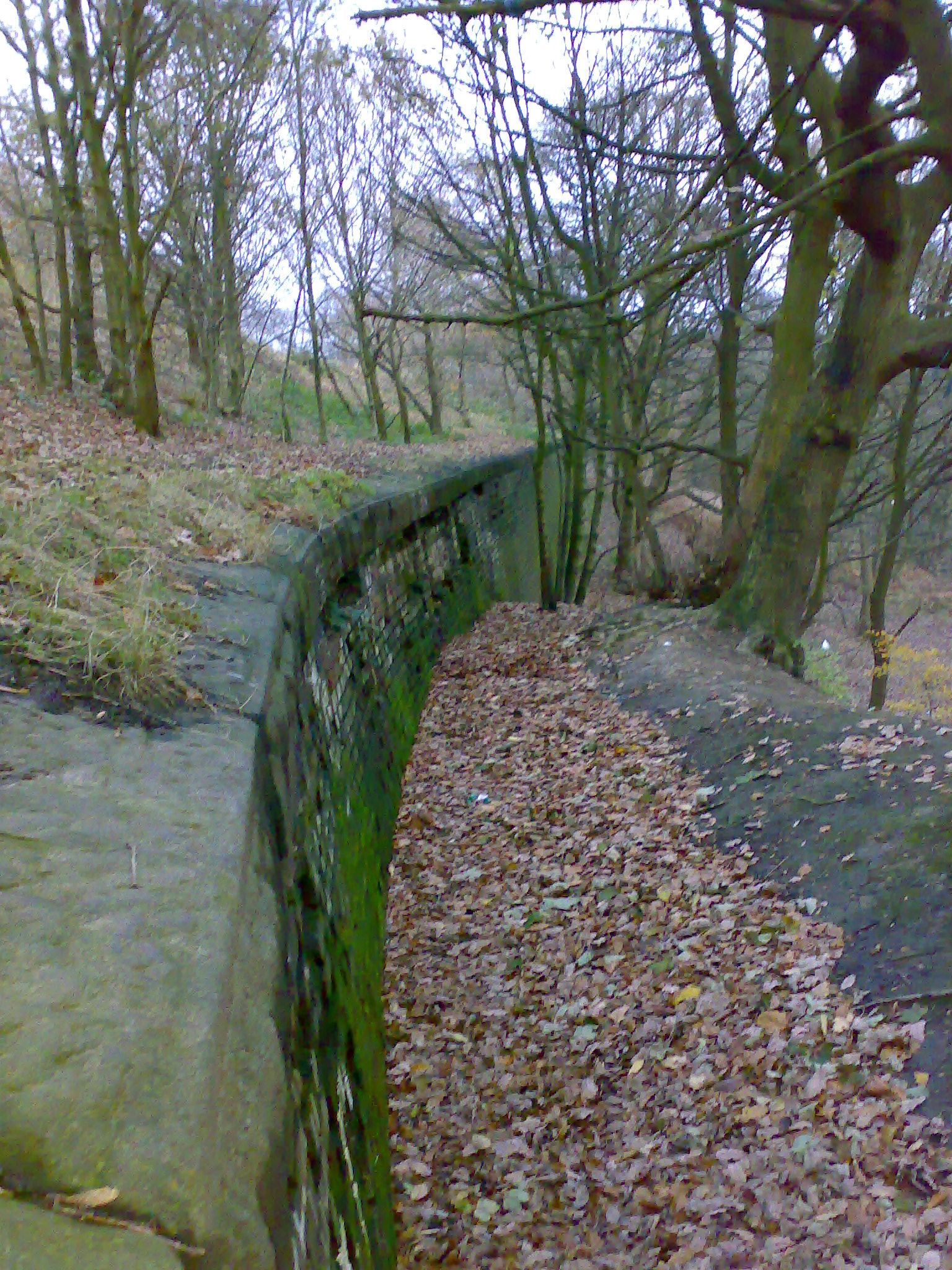
A retaining wall along the Bury arm

The canal was originally supplied by the River Irwell in Bury, at the Weddell Brook tributary. This proved insufficient for local industry and in 1842 Elton Reservoir at Bury was built to become the canal's principal supply. Although the Bury and Bolton arms are on one level, the Salford arm used seventeen broad locks, including some in staircases (Nob End, for example), to descend 190 feet (58 m) over 8 miles (13 km) from the summit level to the lowest point at Salford. Robert Fulton had proposed an inclined plane at Nob End, but this design was rejected. The connection with Fletcher's Canal near Clifton Aqueduct was made by a single lock 90 feet (27 m) long by 21 feet (6 m) wide, with a drop of 18 inches (46 cm).

Although the canal was originally designed to be a narrow canal with narrow locks for boats 7 feet (2 m) wide, in 1794 an agreement was reached with the Leeds and Liverpool Canal company to create a link near Red Moss near Horwich, so broad locks were built to accommodate the 14 feet (4 m) wide boats using that canal. This meant removing some of the narrow locks that had already been built. An extension to the original canal feeder was built at Weddell Brook in Bury, alongside the River Irwell. The route of the Leeds and Liverpool Canal was changed, however, and the planned link never materialised. The design changes to the canal were not completely without merit, since they allowed two narrowboats to use each lock simultaneously, saving passage time and water.

Much of the Bury arm of the canal runs alongside the River Irwell through the Irwell Valley, and eventually required the construction of huge retaining walls to prevent the canal bank from sliding down the hill. Similar strengthening, although on a smaller scale, was required on the Bolton arm where it ran alongside the River Croal. Through these sections the towpath is normally on the side of the canal closest to the river.

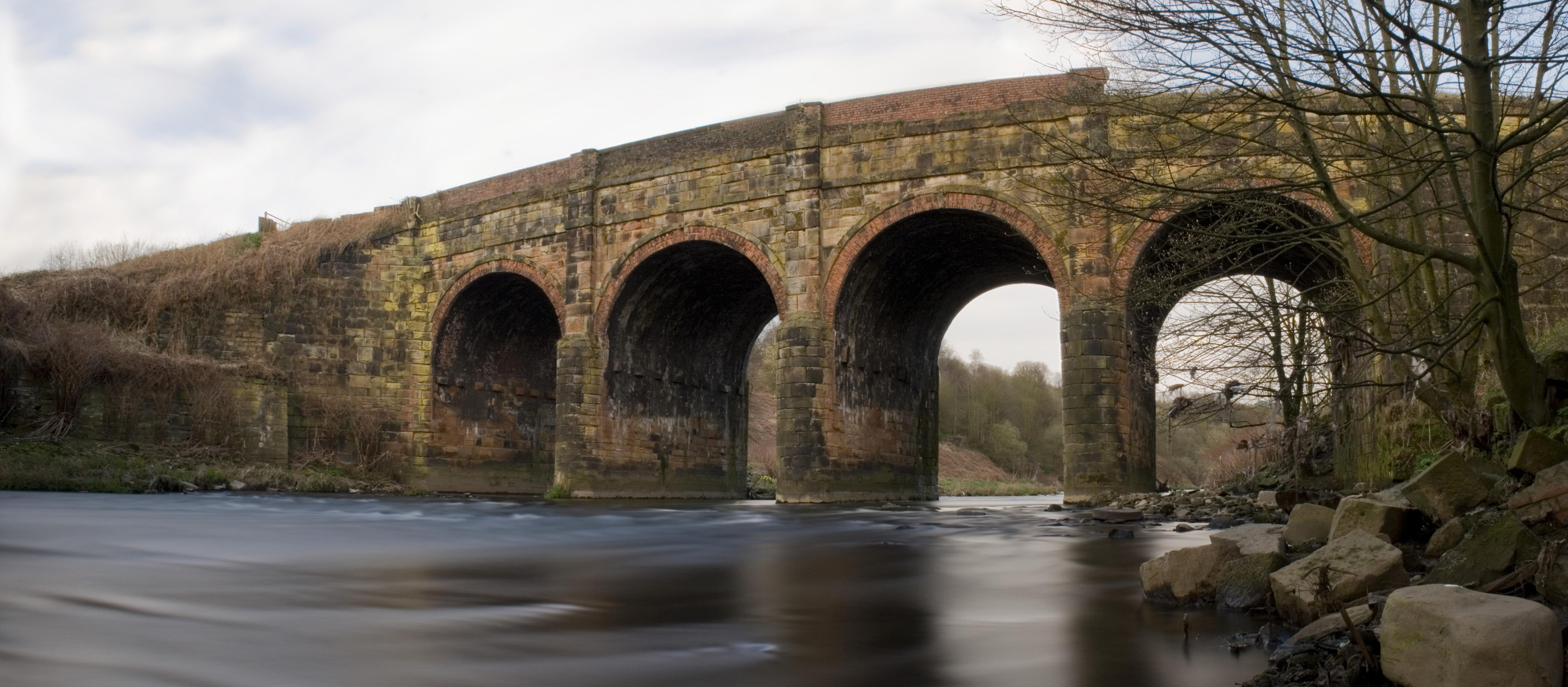
Prestolee Aqueduct

Six aqueducts were required to allow the canal to cross the River Irwell, the River Tonge and four roads. On the Bolton arm these were Hall Lane Aqueduct, Fogg's Aqueduct and the larger Damside Aqueduct, all of which have since been demolished. Hall Lane Aqueduct was damaged by mining subsidence and replaced in 1884–1885. It was demolished in 1950. The Salford arm flowed over Prestolee Aqueduct, then Clifton Aqueduct, and finally the smaller Lumn's Lane Aqueduct (since demolished).

Many bridges were also constructed, along the length of the canal. Most were of small design allowing access to farmland, although many are wide enough for a horse and cart. In places where the canal crossed important thoroughfares, such as Water Street in Radcliffe, Radcliffe Road in Darcy Lever and Agecroft Road in Pendlebury, larger bridges were constructed.

Cranes were used along the many wharfs on the canal to offload cargo. One of these, a steam crane at Mount Sion, still exists (albeit in poor condition). At Bury Wharf a traversing steam crane positioned between the two arms of the terminus would offload cargo to be loaded into waiting lorries and a similar system was used at Radcliffe Wharf.

=== Costs ===
In 1795 costs of construction were detailed as follows:

Money raised and expended
| Work done | £. | S. | D. |
| Original subscription amounts | 47,700 | 0 | 0 |
| Four calls since of ten per cent | 19,080 | 0 | 0 |
| Interest allowed by the treasurer | 376 | 17 | 5 |
| Sundry articles sold | 39 | 6 | 10 |
| Total | 67,196 | 4 | 3 |
| For obtaining the act of Parliament, and for subsequent law expenses inclusive of expenses of meetings | 1,274 | 8 | 5 |
| Purchase of lands | 2,586 | 7 | 8 |
| Cutting and banking | 25,228 | 18 | 11 |
| Bricks | 5,825 | 3 | 11¾ |
| Masonry, lock-building and walls | 8,611 | 19 | 1½ |
| Bridges and aqueducts | 8,069 | 19 | 9½ |
| Timber | 4,123 | 3 | 8 |
| Iron work | 548 | 0 | 2½ |
| Wages, etc. | 1,506 | 15 | 5½ |
| Damage and trespasses | 144 | 13 | 9 |
| Team work | 2,383 | 13 | 1 |
| Carpenters | 1,506 | 4 | 5 |
| Annual rents | 419 | 18 | 2 |
| Surveys | 1,256 | 15 | 9 |
| Expenses of a meeting paid by the treasurer | 10 | 18 | 6 |
| Calls in arrear | 2,400 | 0 | 0 |
| Balance in treasurer's hands | 1,750 | 8 | 5 |
| Total | 67,647 | 9 | 3¾ |
| Deduct for cash advanced on the above payments included in the outstanding debts | 451 | 5 | 0¾ |
| Outstanding | 67,196 | 4 | 3 |

The total cost of construction was £127,700.

== Breaches ==
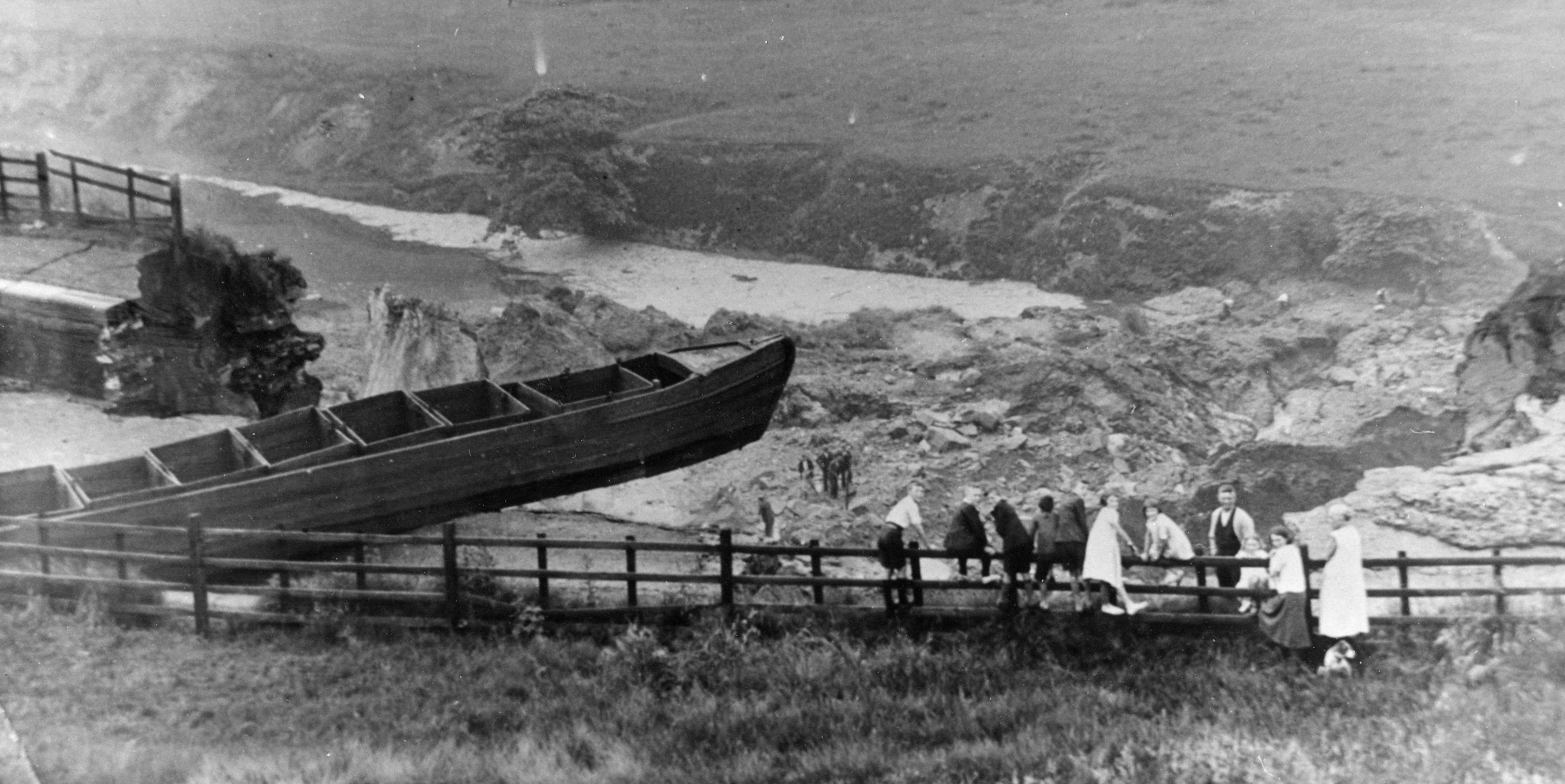
Contemporary view of the 1936 breach at Nob End

The canal has suffered several major breaches throughout its history. As early as 1799 a flood carried away large sections of the lower banks, and on 15 October 1853 two boats were swept through a 93-yard (85 m) breach near the bottom of Nob End Locks (no injuries were reported). Three breaches were reported from 1878 to 1879, in Little Lever and Darcy Lever, the latter near Burnden Chemical Works. Subsidence, caused by mining activity, prompted a breach near Agecroft in 1881. As a result of such incidents, from 1881 to 1888 engineer Edwin Muir was employed to reduce the subsidence caused by mining activity. Similar work was undertaken throughout the 1920s. Maps from the 1880s show that by then, to safeguard against further subsidence, the canal company had purchased areas of coal beneath the canal. In 1884 the canal's owners, the Lancashire and Yorkshire Railway, successfully sued colliery owners Knowles & Sons for losses incurred from damage caused by subsidence. Following this judgment, the railway company settled out of court with other colliery owners. Constant repairs were made, particularly through Pendleton, where the embankment was periodically raised. Some bridges were lifted far above their original supports, while others sank as low as 8 feet (2 m) above head height.

One of the most serious breaches occurred on 6 July 1936 near Nob End, close to the junction of the canal's three arms, reported by the Manchester Evening News the following day. It was never repaired and although the canal saw continued use between Ladyshore Colliery and Bury, it eventually closed in 1961.

CANAL BURSTS ITS BANKS – Barges Smashed and River Dammed When the Bolton–Manchester Canal burst its banks at Little Lever yesterday millions of gallons of water cascaded 300 feet into the River Irwell, carrying down hundreds of tons of earth and stones. The river rapidly became blocked on the Bury side and the banked-up water flooded the surrounding land. "Like Niagara" was the description applied by one resident in the vicinity. Bricks and iron reinforcements of the side of the canal were torn away and carried into the river. Canal barges were smashed up as they too swept over the falls. Fortunately, there are no houses in the neighbourhood, and no one was hurt. It is feared that work at a paper mill and a chemical works which depend upon the canal for transport will be affected. Mr John W. Martin, of Loxham Street, Bolton, said: "I was cycling along the bank when I suddenly saw signs of a subsidence begin on a bend in the canal. I could not stop and my only chance was to ride furiously along the two feet of earth which remained. As I passed over the earth fell away behind the back wheel of my bicycle and I was thrown off. The noise was deafening. A few yards from me tremendous quantities of water, rock, and earth were moving bodily from the canal." A gap about 100 yards long has been opened in the canal embankment. A few years ago there was a similar landslide near the spot.

== Current status ==
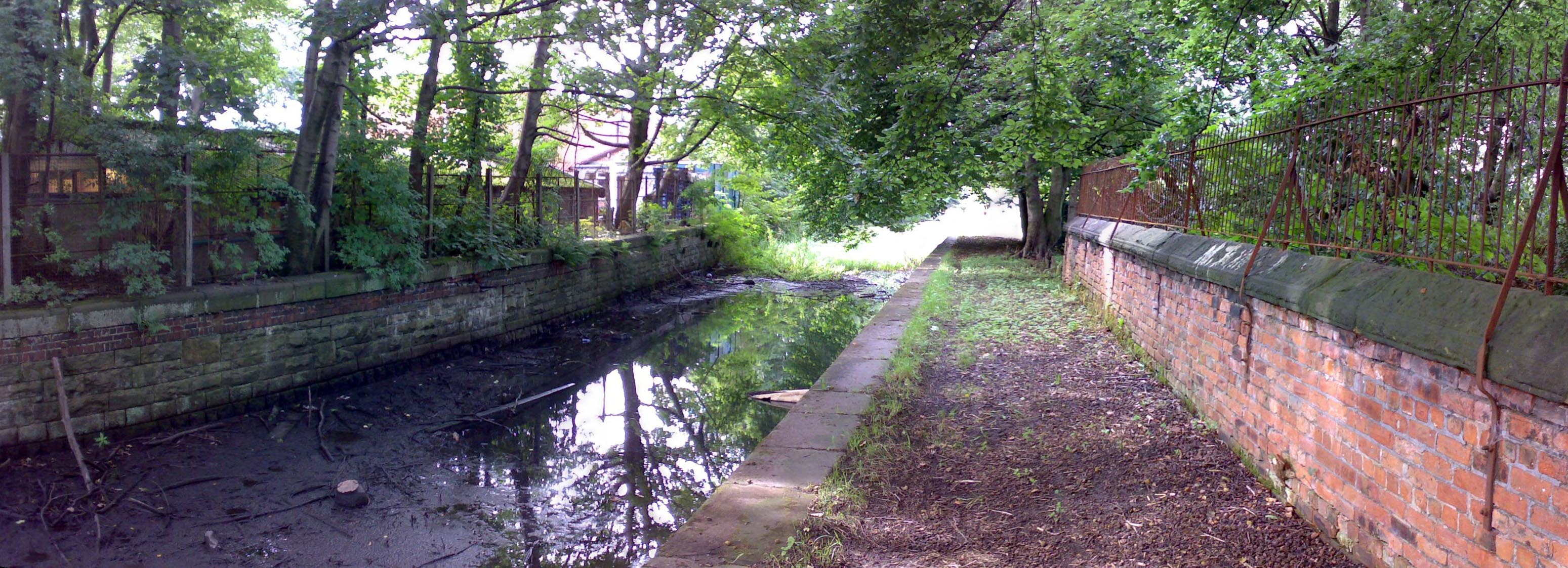
The canal north of Agecroft Road, in water at this point. The towpath here was cleared of overgrowth in 2007.

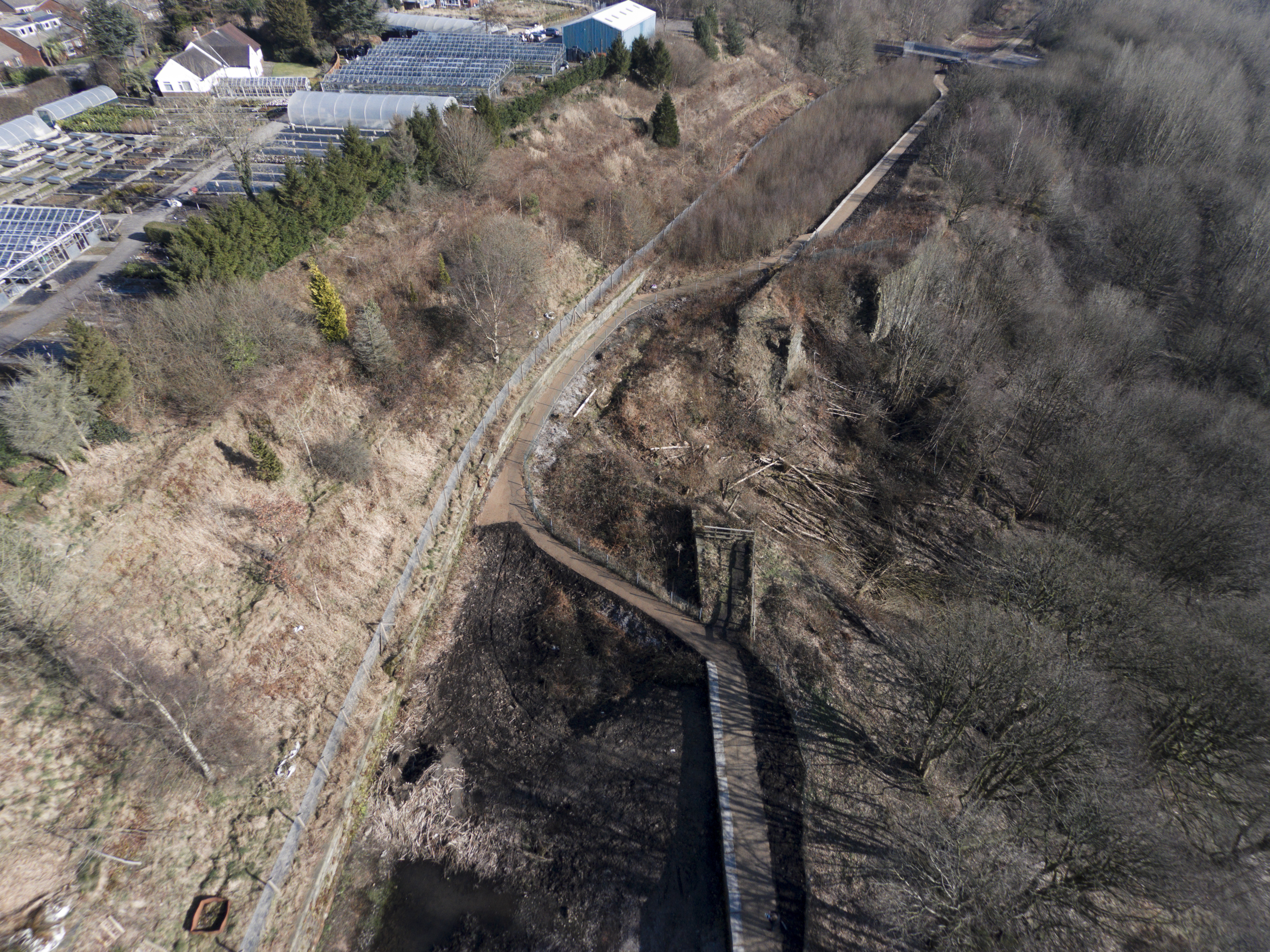
An aerial view of the 1936 breach at Nob End, 2018

Almost 60% of the canal's original length is no longer in water. Bury Wharf is now covered by an industrial estate. A car park has been built on top of the canal, near Daisyfield Viaduct, but from there on the towpath remains accessible. The canal, in water but overgrown with weeds, is culverted under Water Street in Radcliffe. It continues in water up to a dam at Ladyshore, following which the foundations of a demolished paper mill, built in 1956, may be found.

The 1936 breach was never repaired and presents a significant gap in the canal's route. On the Salford arm, although in good condition, the top three locks at Prestolee are derelict; the bottom three have been removed. The canal is in water from the bottom of the lock flight through to Ringley Locks. Ringley Bridge is infilled, as is the canal through Ringley Village and Giants Seat Locks. Kilcoby Bridge is missing and from there the canal is inaccessible until it reaches the M60 motorway. Overgrown, Rhodes Lock is still in reasonable condition. One or more electricity pylons straddle the infilled canal between Rhodes Lock and the motorway, which has been built over the line of the canal. A sludge lagoon built during the motorway's construction blocks a short section toward Clifton Aqueduct. The canal does not take water again until beyond Clifton Aqueduct, where a short 900-foot (270 m) length exists between the former Pilkington factory and the Enersys factory. Lumn's Lane Aqueduct is missing but the canal is in water between there and Holland Street. Beyond this point the canal is infilled and in parts built over, especially through Pendleton. Its junction with the River Irwell in Salford has recently been restored and made navigable.

The Bolton arm of the canal is interrupted by the absence of Hall Lane Aqueduct at Little Lever, which was demolished in 1950 to make way for the widening of Hall Lane. In Darcy Lever, Damside Aqueduct, which crossed Radcliffe Road and the Tonge River, is also missing, having been demolished in June 1965. The route of St Peter's Way has almost entirely destroyed a significant section of the canal as it heads into the centre of Bolton and Church Wharf no longer exists. The last section of the Bolton arm of the canal still in water is currently used for fishing.

The entire route of the canal is protected from any adverse development that would prevent its restoration, having been included in the unitary development plans of Salford City Council, Bolton Council and Bury Council.

== Restoration ==
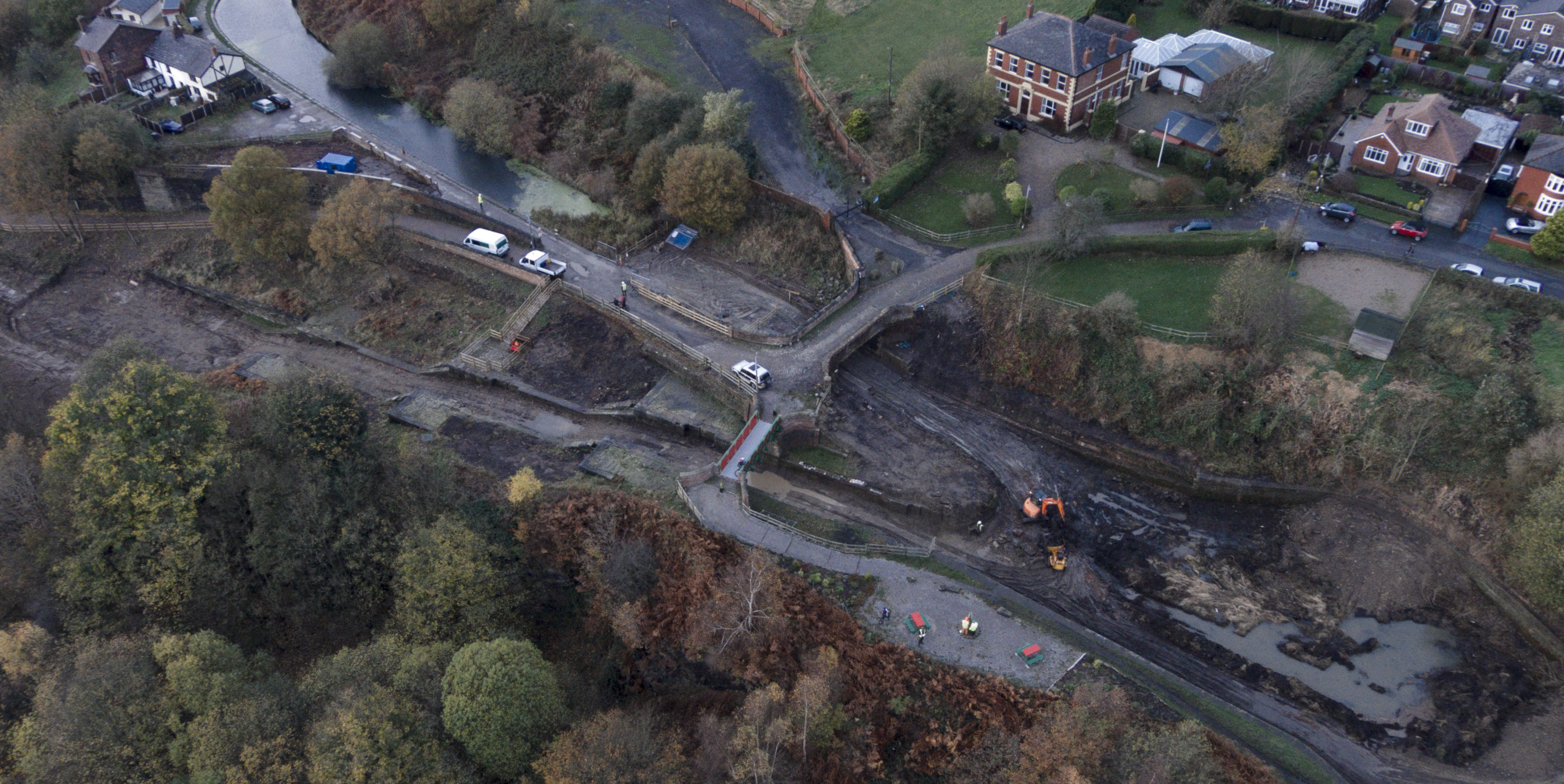
An aerial view of Nob End locks showing the first Bolton bridge dug out and a dam being built across the Bury arm

To help secure the canal's future, in 1987 the Manchester Bolton & Bury Canal Society was formed to protect the canal and campaign for restoration. On 21 October 2005 British Waterways announced funding from European Objective Two Funding, the Northwest Regional Development Agency (NWDA) and Salford City Council for a restoration scheme at the newly named Middlewood Locks in Salford, which began in September 2006. Restoration was halted briefly by the discovery of what was initially thought to be a Second World War bomb but which proved to be a wartime American mortar with no explosive content. Pilings for the tunnel under the Manchester to Preston Line were completed in 2008. The missing Irwell towpath bridge, known as Bloody Bridge, which once crossed the canal's entrance, was replaced with an arched timber structure incorporating elements of the old lock 1. Much of the canal's existing masonry has been re-used and, where possible, the original washwalls were grouted and pointed. The original river locks 1 and 2 were replaced by a single deep lock.

Completion was scheduled for the end of July 2008 and marked with an opening ceremony on 19 September that year, during which the new Margaret Fletcher tunnel under the Manchester Inner Ring Road was formally named. Full restoration of the canal could create up to 6,000 jobs and add an annual £6 million to the local economy. The total cost is estimated at £60 million. The next planned major restoration may be along Salford Crescent.

Local volunteers under the guidance of the Manchester Bolton and Bury Canal Society have for years worked on sections of the canal, removing overgrowth and tidying up its general appearance. A new pedestrian footbridge, designed by artist Liam Curtin, was opened at Nob End Locks in April 2013. Made entirely out of scaled-up pieces of Meccano, it was built by society volunteers and other members of the public at a cost of about £90,000. Toward the end of 2015, work began to excavate the buried locks of the Nob End flight, exposing the six locks. Infill beneath the first bridge on the canal's Bolton arm was also excavated, exposing the towpath for the first time in decades.

== Locations of features ==
Bury Arm

| Location | Coordinates |
|---|---|
| Bury Terminus | 53.593228°N 2.308583°W |
| Elton Reservoir | 53.580022°N 2.319231°W |
| Radcliffe Wharf | 53.564088°N 2.32981°W |
| Steam Crane | 53.557493°N 2.352694°W |
| Ladyshore Dam | 53.555608°N 2.365762°W |
| Paper Mill | 53.55488°N 2.368254°W |
| Nob End breach | 53.555108°N 2.371623°W |

Bolton Arm

| Location | Coordinates |
|---|---|
| Church Wharf | 53.577665°N 2.419969°W |
| Damside Aqueduct | 53.569261°N 2.404139°W |
| Smithy Bridge | 53.569084°N 2.399738°W |
| Fogg's Aqueduct | 53.562714°N 2.390774°W |
| Hall Lane Aqueduct | 53.560232°N 2.389041°W |
| Nob End Dam | 53.554413°N 2.375126°W |

Salford Arm

| Location | Coordinates |
|---|---|
| Bloody Bridge | 53.478468°N 2.259536°W |
| River Locks 1 & 2 | 53.478737°N 2.259992°W |
| Lock 3 | 53.480278°N 2.264302°W |
| Tunnel no.1 | 53.480934°N 2.264576°W |
| Locks 4 & 5 and turning basin | 53.481239°N 2.264619°W |
| Salford Terminus and Lock 6 | 53.481436°N 2.266856°W |
| Windsor Bridge | 53.485187°N 2.275136°W |
| Indigo Street | 53.499539°N 2.290515°W |
| Park House Bridge Road | 53.505011°N 2.294388°W |
| Agecroft Road Bridge | 53.510897°N 2.298028°W |
| Lumn's Lane Aqueduct | 53.518186°N 2.307676°W |
| Clifton Viaduct | 53.526802°N 2.314556°W |
| Clifton Aqueduct | 53.527312°N 2.316844°W |
| M60 Motorway | 53.528728°N 2.325529°W |
| Rhodes Lock | 53.532503°N 2.335973°W |
| Kilcoby Bridge | 53.535972°N 2.340721°W |
| Giant's Seat Locks | 53.538195°N 2.346332°W |
| Horse Shoe Inn | 53.544657°N 2.358238°W |
| Ringley Locks | 53.546536°N 2.360618°W |
| Prestolee Aqueduct | 53.552582°N 2.376284°W |
| Nob End Locks | 53.553793°N 2.375761°W |

== See also ==
- Agecroft Colliery
- Manchester to Preston Line
- Waterway restoration
