= Stoneclough =

Area of Kearsley, Greater Manchester, England

Coordinates: 53.545°N 2.369°W

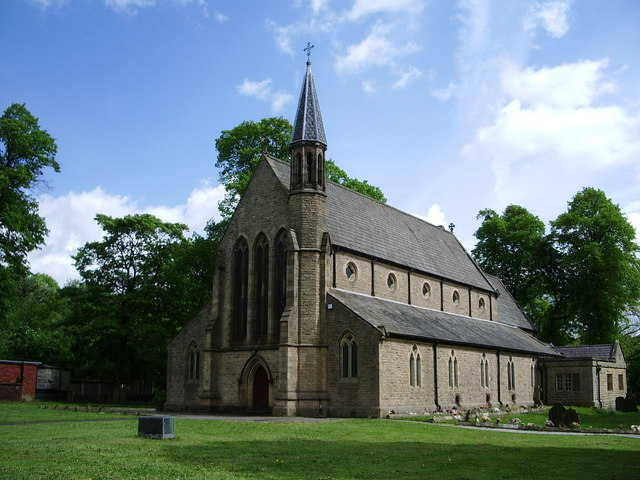
- St Saviour's Church, Ringley

- Location within Greater Manchester
- OS grid reference: SD755055
  - London: 216 miles (348 km)
- Metropolitan borough: Bolton
- Metropolitan county: Greater Manchester
- Region: North West
- Country: England
- Sovereign state: United Kingdom
- Post town: MANCHESTER
- Postcode district: M26
- Dialling code: 01204
- Police: Greater Manchester
- Fire: Greater Manchester
- Ambulance: North West
- UK Parliament: Bolton South and Walkden

Stoneclough is a suburban area of Kearsley in the Metropolitan Borough of Bolton, Greater Manchester, England. It is located 3.7 miles (6 km) south-east of Bolton, 4 miles (6 km) south-west of Bury and 7.9 miles (13 km) north-west of Manchester. It is located on the banks of the River Irwell to the southeast of Bolton.

Historically part of Lancashire, there are a number of listed buildings and recognised ancient monuments in the villages including Ringley Old Bridge, the village stocks, Kearsley Mill, St Saviour's Church and clock tower and the large stone railway bridge on the Manchester to Bolton railway line. The disused Manchester, Bolton and Bury Canal also passes through this area.

Stoneclough is mostly residential, housing has replaced most of the old industry. These industrial sites included the Kearsley Paper Works owned by Robert Fletcher and Sons and Kearsley Power Station located on Hulme Road. These have been demolished.

== Toponymy ==
The Stoneclough means stony ravine from the Old English words stan meaning stony and cloh meaning a ravine.

== Governance ==
Lying within the boundaries of Lancashire since the 12th century, Stoneclough was a small settlement in the township of Kearsley in the civil and ecclesiastical parish of Deane in the Salford Hundred. Stoneclough became part of the Kearsley Local Government District in 1865, and then part of Kearsley Urban District in 1895. Under the Local Government Act 1972, Kearsley Urban District was abolished in 1974 and its former area, including Stoneclough, became an unparished area of the Metropolitan Borough of Bolton in Greater Manchester.

Stoneclough is now part of the Kearsley ward, one of Bolton Council's twenty electoral wards, and is represented by three councillors: Derek Burrows (Lab) since 2006, Liam Irving (Lab) since 2011, and Mark Cunningham (UKIP) since 2016. Stoneclough is also part of the Bolton South East constituency and has been represented in the House of Commons by the Labour Party MP Yasmin Qureshi since 2010.

The Parish of Stoneclough incorporates St. Saviour, Ringley with Holy Trinity, Prestolee. It is part of The Farnworth, Kearsley and Stoneclough Team Ministry.

== Public houses ==
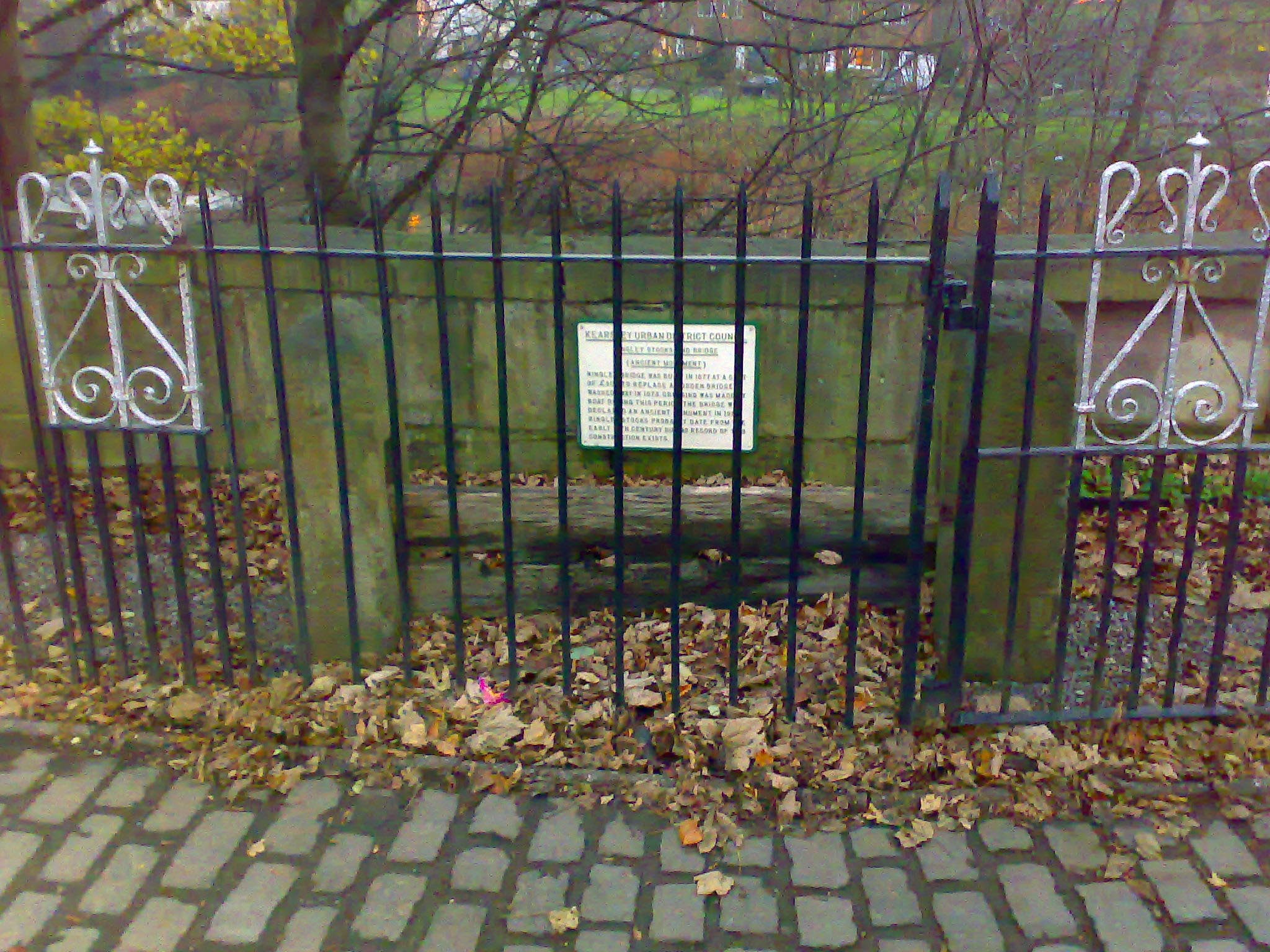
Ringley Stocks, in Ringley village.

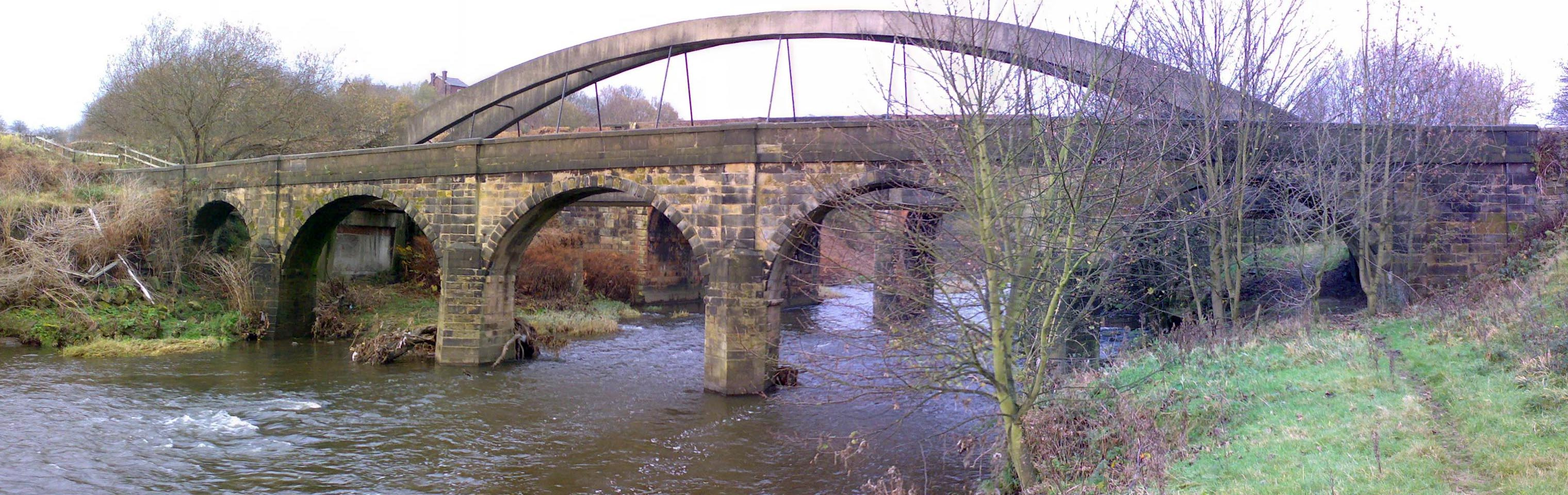
Pack horse bridge over the River Irwell.

There are five public houses around Stoneclough, the Hare and Hounds, the Grapes and the Market Street Tavern are on Market Street. The Horseshoe (next to St Savior's Church) and La Roma Italian restaurant, formerly The Lord Nelson, are either side of the river and are linked (to pedestrians) by Ringley Old Bridge.

== Sport ==
Stoneclough's football team plays in the West Lancashire Football League. The team is currently in the 2nd division in the West Lancashire League.

== Schools ==
There are two primary schools in the area, St. Saviour's, a Church of England primary school in Ringley and Prestolee County Primary School.

== Rail ==
The area is served by Kearsley railway station (formerly named Stoneclough railway station) which is on the Manchester to Preston Line (via Bolton) railway line.
