= Listed buildings in Kearsley =

Kearsley is a town and an unparished area in the Metropolitan Borough of Bolton, Greater Manchester, England, and it includes the area of Ringley and the village of Prestolee. The town contains 21 listed buildings that are recorded in the National Heritage List for England. Of these, one is listed at Grade II*, the middle of the three grades, and the others are at Grade II, the lowest grade. The Manchester and Bolton Railway was built through the area, and two railway bridges are listed. Also passing through the area are the Manchester, Bolton and Bury Canal, which is now disused, and the River Irwell; listed buildings associated with these are bridges, an aqueduct, and milestones. The other listed buildings include a set of stocks, a house later used as a social club, two churches, a tower remaining from a demolished church, and a former spinning mill.

== Key ==
Grade	Criteria
II*	Particularly important buildings of more than special interest
II	Buildings of national importance and special interest

== Buildings ==
Name and location	Photograph	Date	Notes	Grade
Cruck-barn, Seddon's Fold; 53.55001°N 2.37599°W	—	Late 15th or early 16th century	The barn was partly walled in brick in the 17th century and in stone in the 18th century, then largely rebuilt in stone in the 21st century. It is now in sandstone with a blue slate roof, and has four bays. Inside the barn are three cruck frames.	II
Stocks; 53.54386°N 2.35831°W	—	Early 17th century (possible)	The stocks are to the south of Ringley Old Bridge. They consist of two stone posts with slots in their inner faces, and timber foot boards containing two tiers of foot holes.	II
Seddon's Fold Farmhouse; 53.55084°N 2.37677°W	—	17th century	The farmhouse, which was extended later in the 17th century and again in the 18th century, is timber framed with walls of brick and stone, and with a stone-flagged roof. There are two storeys and two bays, a double-depth plan, and two one-bay two-storey extensions to the north. Inside are partitions with wattle-and-daub and lath-and-plaster infill.	II
Byre, Seddon's Fold; 53.55063°N 2.37656°W	—	Late 17th century	The byre is in sandstone with quoins and a stone-flagged roof. It has two storeys, a feeding passage at the east, and three stock entrances in the west wall. Elsewhere are other openings, including doors, windows, ventilation slits, a pitching hole, and a first-floor doorway.	II
Ringley Old Bridge; 53.54396°N 2.35869°W		1677	The bridge carries road over the River Irwell. It is in stone and consists of three round arches with a plain parapet, the west arch being lower. There are triangular cutwaters rising to form refuges. The bridge is also a scheduled monument.	II*
Stable, Seddon's Fold; 53.55050°N 2.37656°W	—	18th century	The stable block is mainly in brick, with an east front in sandstone, and a stone-slate roof, and is in Gothick style. There are two storeys, with a hayloft above, a three-bay north range, and a single-storey south outshut. The openings have pointed heads with keystones. On the ground floor is a central doorway and two windows, all with brick jambs, and on the upper floor are three lunettes.	II
Prestolee Bridge; 53.55238°N 2.37664°W		Late 18th century	A former packhorse bridge over the River Irwell. It is in stone and consists of five elliptical arches, with alternate projecting voussoirs, cutwaters, flat piers, a band, and a parapet. The roadway is 5 feet (1.5 m) wide.	II
Aqueduct over River Irwell; 53.55261°N 2.37624°W		1790s	The aqueduct carries the former Manchester, Bolton and Bury Canal over the River Irwell. It is in stone and consists of four round arches lined with brick. The aqueduct has round cutwaters, flat piers, two flat bands, and a brick parapet. To the south is a smaller arch piercing the abutments.	II
Boundary stone 53.54396°N 2.35907°W		18th or early 19th century	The boundary stone is to the west of Ringley Old Bridge. It has a scrolled top and lines down the middle, and is inscribed with the names of parishes.	II
Tower, St Saviour's Church; 53.54393°N 2.35812°W		1826	The tower is all that remains of a church by Charles Barry. It is in stone and has three stages. The entrance is now blocked, and has an inserted window with an architrave and a hood mould. Above is a mullioned window, and a clock face on each side. At the top is a cornice and an embattled parapet with corner pinnacles.	II
Kearsley Vale Social Club; 53.54547°N 2.36605°W	—	1834	Originally a house, later used for other purposes, it is in brick on a stone base, with stone dressings, a sill band, a top cornice and a slate roof. There are two storeys and four bays, the second bay projecting forward, and the fourth bay recessed with an additional storey. On the front is a porch with paired Ionic columns, and above the door is a segmental fanlight. The windows are sashes, that above the doorway in an architrave, and at the rear is a conservatory.	II
Railway Bridge, Kearsley railway station 53.54392°N 2.37424°W		1837	The bridge was built for the Manchester and Bolton Railway whose engineer was Jesse Hartley, and carries the railway over Stoneclough Road. It is in stone and consists of a single elliptical arch, over which is a fielded panel. The parapet is corbelled, and the abutments are coped.	II
Railway Underbridge; 53.53840°N 2.36251°W		c. 1837	The bridge was built for the Manchester and Bolton Railway whose engineer was Jesse Hartley, and carries the railway over Hulme Road. It is in stone and consists of a single round arch, with radiating voussoirs, and coped abutments.	II
Milestone approximately 50 metres south of Prestolee aqueduct 53.55225°N 2.37581°W	—	1840s	The milestone is on the towpath of the former Manchester, Bolton and Bury Canal which is now disused. It consists of a rectangular stone post inscribed "M/7 3/4", indicating the distance in miles from Manchester.	II
Milestone approximately 60 metres east of Prestolee Road; 53.54973°N 2.37236°W	—	1840s	The milestone is on the towpath of the former Manchester, Bolton and Bury Canal which is now disused. It consists of a rectangular stone post inscribed "M/7 1/2", indicating the distance in miles from Manchester.	II
Milestone approximately 180 metres northwest of Kearsley Road; 53.54661°N 2.36110°W	—	1840s	The milestone is on the towpath of the former Manchester, Bolton and Bury Canal which is now disused. It consists of a rectangular stone post inscribed "M/7", indicating the distance in miles from Manchester.	II
Milestone approximately 4,180 metres northwest of Kearsley Road; 53.54829°N 2.36700°W	—	1840s	The milestone is on the towpath of the former Manchester, Bolton and Bury Canal which is now disused. It consists of a rectangular stone post inscribed "M/7 1/4", indicating the distance in miles from Manchester.	II
St Saviour's Church; 53.54363°N 2.35702°W		1850–1854	The church was designed by Sharpe and Paley to replace a church nearby. It is in stone with a stone-slate roof, and consists of a nave with a clerestory, north and south aisles, a north porch, and a chancel with a south vestry. On the southwest corner is an octagonal turret with a cornice and a spire.	II
Holy Trinity Church, Prestolee; 53.54781°N 2.37077°W		1859–1862	The church is in stone, and has a tiled roof with coped gables and finials. It is in Decorated style, and consists of a nave, north and south transepts, a chancel, and a steeple in the angle of the nave and the south transept. The steeple has a four-stage tower with diagonal buttresses, a stairway to the second stage with a balustrade, clock faces, and a broach spire. At the east end is a five-light window.	II
St Stephen's Church; 53.53814°N 2.37154°W		1870–71	The church, designed by J. Medland Taylor in Decorated style, is in stone, and has slate roofs with coped gables and finials. It consists of a nave, a wide north aisle with a north porch, a chancel with a north vestry, and a west tower. The tower has four stages, a west door, clock faces on four sides, and at the top are gargoyles and an embattled parapet.	II
Kearsley Mill; 53.54745°N 2.37641°W		1906	A former cotton spinning mill built with steel framing and concrete and encased in red brick with some yellow brick. It has a main long rectangular building with five storeys and a basement. At the northwest is a chimney 200 feet (61 m) tall with white lettering, and at the southeast is a stair tower containing a water tank and with a domed top. There are smaller buildings including a single-storey engine house and offices.	II
