= St Saviour's Church, Ringley =

Coordinates: 53.5436°N 2.3570°W

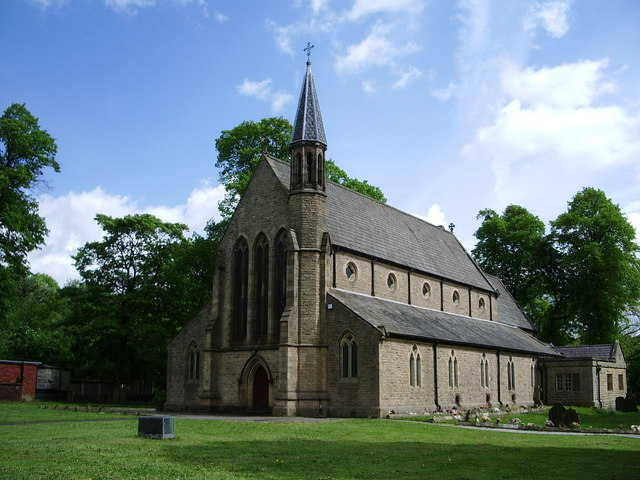
- St Saviour's Church, Ringley, from the southwest

- Location in Greater Manchester
- OS grid reference: SD 764,052
- Location: Kearsley, Greater Manchester
- Country: England
- Denomination: Anglican
- Website: St Saviour, Ringley

History
- Status: Parish church
- Founded: 1625
- Founder: Nathan Walworth
- Consecrated: 10 June 1854

Architecture
- Functional status: Active
- Heritage designation: Grade II
- Designated: 31 May 1966
- Architect(s): Charles Barry, Sharpe and Paley
- Architectural type: Church
- Style: Gothic Revival
- Groundbreaking: 1850
- Completed: 1854

Specifications
- Materials: Stone

Administration
- Province: York
- Diocese: Manchester
- Archdeaconry: Bolton
- Deanery: Bolton
- Parish: Stoneclough

Clergy
- Rector: Revd Stephen Nolan

St Saviour's Church is in Ringley, Kearsley, near Bolton, Greater Manchester, England. It is an active Anglican parish church in the deanery of Bolton, the archdeaconry of Bolton and the diocese of Manchester. Its benefice is united with those of St Peter's, Farnworth, St John the Evangelist, Farnworth and Holy Trinity, Prestolee. The church is recorded in the National Heritage List for England as a designated Grade II listed building.

== History ==
The first church was built in 1625. The chapel was donated by Nathan Walworth who was born at Ringley Fold in 1572 and went on to become the Earl of Pembroke.

The chapel was licensed, but the Bishop of Chester refused to consecrate the building until money for maintenance was guaranteed. The locals had different ideas about the amount required. The dispute went on for nearly ten years and reached the point where Nathan was threatening to pull the place down, sell the timber and stones and give the money to the poor, 'and so it shall be Gods still'.

Happily, the letter containing his threats appears to have reached Ringley, as the consecration was being performed in December 1634.

The name 'St Saviour's Chapel' was chosen by John Bridgeman, Bishop of Chester, and he signed the consecration deed on June 1st, 1635.

1640 - Nathan Walworth's will mentions that he has recently built a schoolhouse near the chapel.

This fell down in 1798 and a new one was erected by subscription on the old site, between the Horse Shoe Inn and the canal. It was demolished when the present school was opened in 1872.

1826 - A second church was erected almost on the site of the first and was consecrated on August 6th 1827 (the Feast of Our Lord's Transfiguration). The architect was Charles Barry, then thirty-one years who went on to design the Houses of Parliament. He also designed All Saints, Stand, one of several churches funded by the £1,000,000 thank offering voted by Government for church building after the victory at Waterloo.

By 1854 this second church was too small for the growing congregation and was pulled down. Only the isolated tower remains, still with a stone from the original church set in its west wall and bearing the inscription 'Nathan Walworth Builded Mee. Anno Do 1625'.

In 1850–54 this church was demolished, other than its tower, and a new church was built in a position further back from the road, leaving the tower isolated. The new church was designed by the Lancaster architects Sharpe and Paley. It is a commissioners' church, a grant of £200 having been provided by the Church Building Commissioners towards the cost of its construction. Its total cost was £2,500 (equivalent to £240,000 in 2025), of which £500 was given by the 13th Earl of Derby. The church was consecrated on 10 June 1854 by the Dr James Prince Lee, Bishop of Manchester of the then comparatively new Diocese of Manchester. The collection was £62. The incumbent was James Radcliffe Lyon, M.A.

1898 - The chapelry was made into a parish by an Order in Council of 20th October during the incumbency of Rev. James Henry Street. At that time the dimensions of the parish were roughly four miles by three.

1904 - The tower was repaired, raised two feet and a new clock inserted to commemorate the jubilee of the third church. The tower had an official reopening in 1907.

1914 - To provide a place of worship for the rapidly growing settlement of Outwood, the mission church of St. Aidan was opened and dedicated in May.

1921 - The choir vestry was added to St. Saviour.

1924 - St. Mary's (an army hut) was consecrated by the Bishop and opened on Lady Day. This second mission church served the hamlet of twenty-six houses built at Bottom oth'Fields in Outwood.

1941-50 - Incumbency of the Rev. David Matthews, who put a stop to the old village custom of ducking Ringley's "Mayor' in the canal. The Mayor was chosen during Ringley Wakes, carried round to all the public houses in the district and given a free drink at each. There were a lot of pubs then and 'district' was liberally interpreted, so mayhem ensued and the ducking at the end of his first day's office was a noisy and somewhat risky affair.

The custom had been stopped once before by the Rev Street, but was reintroduced in the 1920s. The Mayor making was revived briefly in the 1990s, but as more of a community event. The last 'ducking' was in 2024 at the St Saviours summer fete.

In the second half of the twentieth century s Mary's closed, following the demise of the colliery at Outwood and the demolition of Bottom o'th'Fields.

Tebay's Bowling Green Inn, once used for a Sunday School after closing time on Sunday afternoons shut in 1957. In 1987 St Aidan's was destroyed by fire and the land on which it stood was sold for new housing.

In the early 1990s the parish of St Saviour, Ringley was united with that of Holy Trinity, Prestolee (built in 1862).

The 1990s also saw the beginning of major repair: to St Saviour's roof, the installation of a new heating system and repairs and renewal of stonework and glass.

As well as this, under-pinning and stabilising of the Chancel proved necessary at the start of the new millennium and this work, together with refurbishment of the choir vestry, was completed in 2002.

== Architecture ==
=== Exterior ===
The church is built in stone with ashlar dressings, and has a stone slate roof. Its plan consists of a five-bay nave with a clerestory, north and south aisles, a north porch and a chancel with a south vestry. At the southwest corner is an octagonal turret. The turret has a gabled buttress over which are lancet bell openings, a cornice and a spire. In the west end is a doorway over which are three tall two-light windows.

=== Interior ===
Some of the fittings were moved from the old church. These include the chancel rails in rococo style, and a communion table in the north chapel dated 1654. The stained glass in the north side of the chancel are from the 17th century. Later fittings include a reredos and sedilia in alabaster dating from 1879 containing mosaic and statues, a rood beam with figures from 1925, and an altar with a canopy in a chapel at the northwest of the church dating from 1921. Also in the church are monuments to the memory of Matthew Fletcher, owner of the Wet Earth Colliery who died in 1808, and his nephew Ellis Fletcher who died in 1834.

=== Organ ===
Three manual pneumatic organ by Wilkinsons of Kendal, with 21 speaking stops, six couplers and seven composition pedals. Inscription: 'To the Glory of GOD in commemoration of and thanksgiving for the reign of Victoria, Queen of England and Empress of India, December 12th, 1903'.

=== The Fletcher Memorials ===
In the south aisle, there are mural monuments to Matthew Fletcher, who died 21st August 1808, aged 78 and to his nephew Ellis Fletcher, who departed this life after a severe affliction, borne with patient resignation, on 26th April, 1834, aged 69. Ellis's widow Mary (died 1836), and their sons John (1836), and Ellis (1854) are also commemorated and their memorial used to stand on the wall of the Sanctuary.

The Fletchers owned Clifton Colliery, among others, and Matthew Fletcher played a major part in getting the Manchester, Bolton and Bury Canal built. Coal and passenger boats were running by 1796, before the canal was completed. A disastrous breach in the 1930s added to the problems of declining trade and there has been no traffic for many years.

=== Separate tower ===
Standing in an isolated position by the road is the tower from the original church. A plaque above the door refers to its building in 1625. Another plaque refers to the addition of a vestry in 1726, and the church's rebuilding in 1826. The tower is in three stages, with entrances on the lowest stage, some of which are blocked. In the middle and upper stages are three-light mullioned windows, and above these in the top stage is a clock face on each side. Over these is a cornice and an embattled parapet with a pinnacle at each corner. The tower is a Grade II listed building.

=== Churchyard ===
The churchyard contains the war graves of six soldiers of the First World War, and two airmen, a soldier and Royal Naval Volunteer Reserve officer of the Second World War.

== See also ==
- Listed buildings in Kearsley
- List of works by Sharpe and Paley
- List of Commissioners' churches in Northeast and Northwest England
