= Ringley Old Bridge =

Listed bridge in Greater Manchester, England

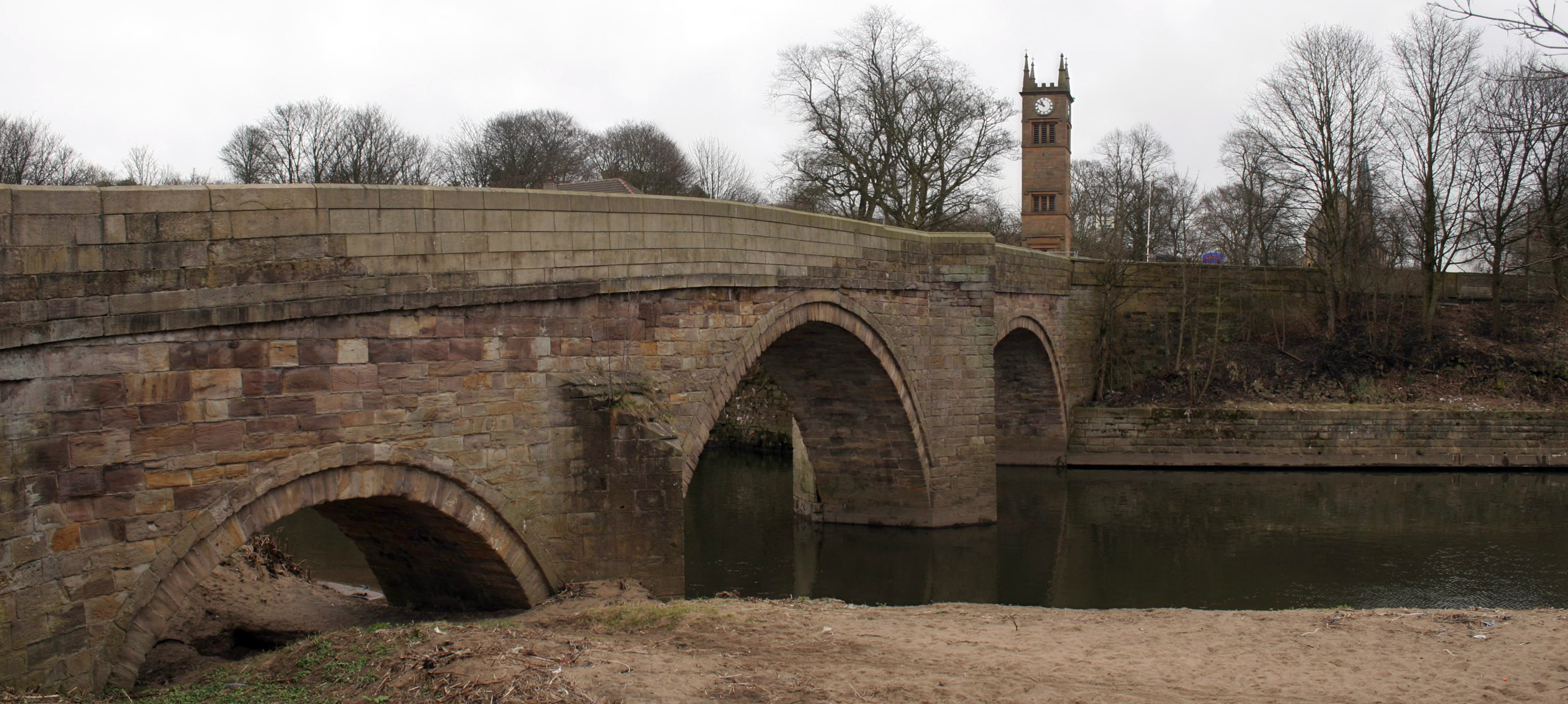
- Ringley Old Bridge
- Coordinates: 53°32′38″N 2°21′31″W
- Crosses: River Irwell
- Locale: Kearsley, Greater Manchester, England

Characteristics
- Material: Stone
- No. of spans: 3

History
- Built: 1677
- Construction cost: £500

Listed Building – Grade II*
- Official name: Ringley Old Bridge
- Designated: 18 August 1986
- Reference no.: 1356800

Scheduled monument
- Official name: Ringley Old Bridge
- Reference no.: 1001957

Location
- Interactive map of Ringley Old Bridge

Ringley Old Bridge is an ancient stone bridge in Kearsley, a town in the Metropolitan Borough of Bolton, Greater Manchester, England. It crosses the River Irwell, linking Ringley with Stoneclough. The bridge has two large semi-circular arches and a third, smaller arch for the tow path. It is a Grade II* listed building, designated on 19 August 1986, and is also a scheduled monument.

The bridge was built in 1677 at a cost of £500. It replaced a wooden bridge that had been swept away by a flood in 1673.

== See also ==
- Grade II* listed buildings in Greater Manchester
- Listed buildings in Kearsley
- Scheduled monuments in Greater Manchester
