= Barton upon Irwell Rural District =

Former rural district in Lancashire, England

Coordinates: 53.524°N 2.3204°W

Barton upon Irwell
- Area
  - 1911: 6,793 acres (27.49 km^{2})
  - 1921: 6,762 acres (27.36 km^{2})
  - 1931: 6,762 acres (27.36 km^{2})
- Population
  - 1901: 8,068
  - 1921: 10,110
  - 1931: 15,712
- History
  - Origin: Barton upon Irwell Rural Sanitary District
  - Created: 1894
  - Abolished: 1933
  - Succeeded by: Municipal Borough of Eccles, Kearsley Urban District, Stretford Urban District, Urmston Urban District
- Status: Rural district
- Government: Barton upon Irwell Rural District Council
  - HQ: Patricroft
- Subdivisions
  - Type: civil parishes

Barton-upon-Irwell was, from 1894 to 1933, a rural district in the administrative county of Lancashire, England.

== History ==
The rural district was created by the Local Government Act 1894 as successor to Barton-upon-Irwell Rural Sanitary District, formed in 1875. In 1920 the boundary of the district was adjusted to reflect a change in county boundaries, and it exchanged areas with Bucklow Rural District, Cheshire.

== Civil parishes and boundaries ==
The rural district consisted of four civil parishes:

- Barton Moss
- Clifton
- Davyhulme
- Flixton

The district formed two distinct areas: to the south the parishes of Barton Moss, Davyhulme and Flixton were surrounded to the north by Worsley Urban District and the Borough of Eccles; to the east by the County Borough of Salford; to the south by Urmston Urban District and by the boundary with Cheshire and to the west by Irlam Urban District. The parish of Clifton was a detached exclave to the north adjacent to the urban districts of Kearsley and Swinton and Pendlebury.

== Abolition ==
The rural district was abolished on 1 April 1933. Two county review orders: the Lancashire (Manchester and district) Review Order and the Lancashire (Southern Areas) Review Order transferred the district's area to four neighbouring towns: Barton Moss passed to the Borough of Eccles, Clifton to Kearsley Urban District, Davyhulme to Stretford Urban District and Flixton to Urmston Urban District.
