= Kearsley Town Hall =

Municipal building in Kearsley, England

Coordinates: 53.5403°N 2.3775°W

Kearsley Town Hall was a municipal building on Bolton Road in Kearsley, a town in Greater Manchester, in England. The building, which was the headquarters of Kearsley Urban District Council, was demolished in 2013. The building was originally a private house, Highfield House, which was completed in 1877 and acquired by the council in 1910.

== History ==
Following significant population growth, largely associated with the number of cotton mills in the area, a local board of health was established in Kearsley in 1865. In 1894 the local board was replaced by Kearsley Urban District Council.

In 1910, the council purchased Highfield House, which stood on the corner of Bolton Road and Highfield Street, and had been commissioned by Samuel Gee. The house had been designed in the Victorian style, built in red brick and was completed shortly before Gee died in 1877.

The design involved an asymmetrical main frontage of three bays facing onto Bolton Road. The central bay featured a segmental headed doorway with a hood mould on the ground floor, with a sash window on the first floor. The left hand bay was fenestrated with bay windows on both floors and was gabled, while the right hand bay was fenestrated by a bay window on the ground floor and two sash windows on the first floor. The council converted the building for municipal use and installed a council chamber.

A war memorial, in the form of a simple cross on a pedestal, which intended to commemorate the lives of local people who had died in the First World War, was installed in front of the town hall in October 1921.

The town hall was the location of many local celebrations. When Bolton Wanderers F.C. won the 1958 FA Cup final, it was the first stop on its victory coach tour, attracting a crowd of 5,000 people.

The building continued to serve as the meeting place of the district council for much of the 20th century, but ceased to be the local seat of government when the enlarged Bolton Borough Council was formed in 1974. The town hall was subsequently leased to the Probation Service, which used it for training and conferences. In 2011, the building was sold for £138,000, and Hamill Investments announced plans to convert it into offices. However, the town hall suffered from vandalism, including a fire, and it was then deemed uneconomic to repair it. It was demolished in 2013, with housing built on the site.
