= Neil Shawcross =

British artist (born 1940)

Neil Shawcross MBE, RHA, HRUA
- Born: 15 March 1940 (age 86); Kearsley, Lancashire, England
- Education: Bolton College of Art, Lancaster College of Art
- Known for: Portraiture, nudes, still life, printmaking, stained glass
- Movement: Post-Impressionism
- Awards: Gallaher Portrait Prize 1966; RUA Conor Award 1975; RUA Gold Medal 1978, 1982, 1987, 1994, 1997, 2001; RUA Academician 1978; Arnolds National Portrait Award, Dublin 1990; James Adam Prize 1998, Sandford and Leinster Galleries Award 2006 approx.

Neil Shawcross MBE, RHA, HRUA (born 15 March 1940) is an artist born in Kearsley, Lancashire, England, and resident in Northern Ireland since 1962. Primarily a portrait painter, his subjects have included Nobel prize winning poet Seamus Heaney, novelist Francis Stuart (for the Ulster Museum), former Lord Mayor of Belfast David Cook (for Belfast City Council), footballer Derek Dougan and fellow artists Colin Middleton and Terry Frost. He also paints the figure and still life, taking a self-consciously childlike approach to composition and colour. His work also includes printmaking, and he has designed stained glass for the Ulster Museum and St. Colman's Church, Lambeg, County Antrim. He lives in Hillsborough, County Down.

== Education and early life ==
Shawcross studied at Bolton College of Art from 1955 to 1958, and Lancaster College of Art from 1958 to 1960, before moving to Belfast in 1962 to take up a part-time lecturer's post at the Belfast College of Art, becoming full-time in 1968. He continued to lecture there until his retirement in 2004.

The academic career of Shawcross includes a residency at Virginia Center for the Creative Arts in 1987, a residency at Vermont Studio Center in 1991, and a visiting assistant professorship at Pennsylvania State University in 1993.

Shawcross is a Patron of the charity YouthAction Northern Ireland.

== Awards ==
He was elected an Associate of the Royal Ulster Academy of Art in 1975, and was made a full Academician in 1977. He won the Academy's Conor Award in 1975, its gold medal in 1978, 1982, 1987, 1994, 1997 and 2001, and its James Adam Prize in 1998. Neil Shawcross is also a member of the Royal Hibernian Academy (RHA). He was awarded the Gallaher Portrait Prize in 1966.

Queen's University Belfast conferred an honorary doctorate upon Shawcross in 2007 (Duniv).

Shawcross was appointed Member of the Order of the British Empire (MBE) in the 2014 New Year Honours for services to arts in Northern Ireland.

== Exhibitions ==
He has exhibited nationally, with one-man shows in London, Manchester, Dublin and Belfast, and internationally in Hong Kong and the United States, and his work is found in many private and corporate collections.

· 1962 Queen's University, Belfast· 1963 Tib Lane Gallery, Manchester· 1964 Queen's University, Belfast· 1965 New Gallery, Belfast· 1966 Royal Watercolour Society Gallery, London · 1968 New Gallery, Belfast · 1970 Tom Caldwell Gallery, Belfast · 1970 Octagon Theatre, Belfast · 1972 Octagon Gallery, Belfast · 1974 Neptune Gallery, Dublin · 1974 Tom Caldwell Gallery, Belfast · 1977 Bell Gallery, Belfast · 1979 Tom Caldwell Gallery, Dublin · 1982 Bell Gallery, Belfast · 1983 Peacock Gallery, Craigavon · 1983 Visitors' Centre, Enniskillen · 1983 Tom Caldwell Gallery, Dublin · 1984 Gordon Gallery, Derry · 1984 Flowerfield Arts Centre, Portstewart · 1984 Grant Fine Art, Newcastle · 1985 Tom Caldwell Gallery, Dublin · 1986 Art and Research Exchange, Belfast · 1987 Gordon Gallery, Derry · 1988 Tom Caldwell Gallery, Dublin · 1990 Tom Caldwell Gallery, Belfast · 1990 Tom Caldwell Gallery, Dublin · 1990 Clifford Street Fine Art, London · 1992 Industrial Development Board Office, London · 1993 Tom Caldwell Gallery, Belfast · 1998 Tom Caldwell Gallery, Belfast · 2000 Peppercanister Gallery, Dublin · 2001 Island Arts Centre, Lisburn · 2001 Cavanacor Gallery, Donegal · 2002 Tom Caldwell Gallery, Belfast · 2003 Peppercanister Gallery, Dublin · 2005 Peppercanister Gallery, Dublin · 2007 Pigyard Gallery, Wexford

In 2010, the Merrion Hotel, Dublin, hosted a private collection of the works of Neil Shawcross.

In 2015, Shawcross exhibited a collection of six foot tall book covers inspired by original Penguin paperbacks at the National Opera House in Wexford, Ireland.

In 2018, Shawross donated to Belfast City Council a collection of 36 paintings dedicated to 'Writers of Belfast' in a show of appreciation to his adopted home city. A major retrospective of Shawcross' works were exhibited at the F.E. McWilliam Gallery and Studio, Banbridge, in the same year.

== Works ==
- Table Top Still Life (1990), Mixed media, Arts Council of Northern Ireland collection
