= Pilkington, Greater Manchester =

Former civil parish in Manchester, England

Pilkington
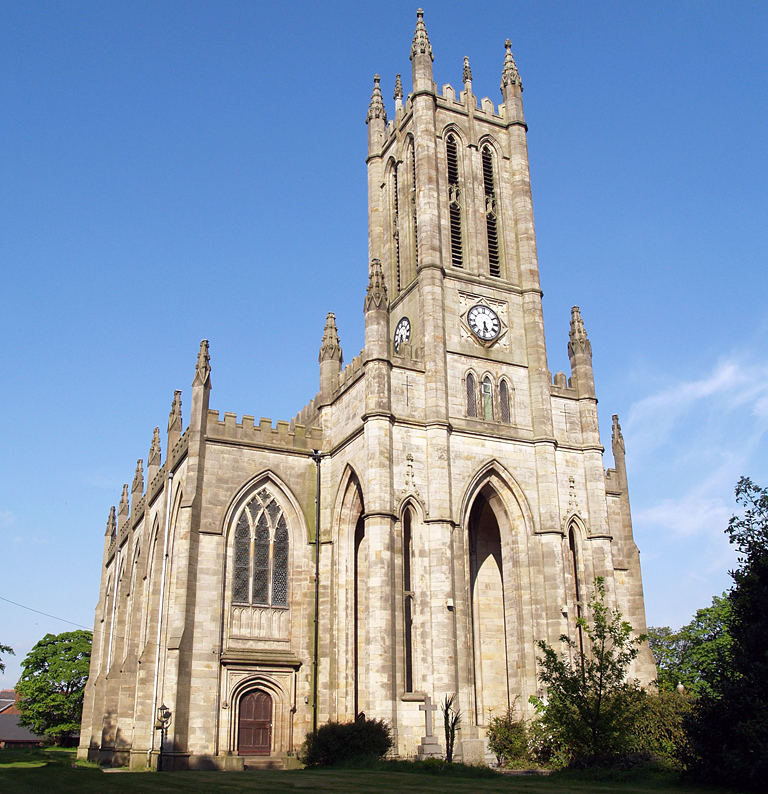
- History
  - Created: High Middle Ages
  - Abolished: 1894
  - Succeeded by: County Borough of Bury, Whitefield Urban District, Radcliffe Urban District
- Status: Township, civil parish
- Subdivisions
  - Type: "Recognised divisions"
  - Units: Outwood, Unsworth, Whitefield

Pilkington is a former township and civil parish in the hundred of Salford and county of Lancashire (now Greater Manchester), in northern England.

== History ==
=== Manor ===
The Pilkington family can be traced from about 1200. The senior line acquired the manor of Bury when Roger Pilkington who died in about 1347, married Alice Bury. Roger Pilkington and his father, also Roger, were present with Thomas, 2nd Earl of Lancaster, at the Battle of Boroughbridge in 1322. The older Roger was imprisoned and fined, his son secured pardon by undertaking military service abroad. His son Sir Roger Pilkington (1325–1407) served under Henry of Grosmont, 1st Duke of Lancaster in 1355, and under John of Gaunt in 1359–60 and 1369. The Pilkingtons built a house with a moat between 1359 and 1400 and were granted a licence to crenellate the manor house at Bury in 1469 when it became known as Bury Castle.

Roger's son Sir John Pilkington (d. 1421) was granted custody of the manors of Prestwich and Alkrington. He married Margaret (d. 1436), heir of John Verdon of Brixworth, Northamptonshire, soon after the death of her first husband, Hugh Bradshaw of Leigh. Margaret's son from her first marriage, William Bradshaw, died in 1415, leaving a daughter, Elizabeth. In 1430 Margaret settled the manors of her inheritance which included Stagenhoe in Hertfordshire, Clipston, Northamptonshire and Brixworth in Northamptonshire, and Bressingham in Norfolk, on her Pilkington sons, John, Edmund (d. about 1451), and Robert (d. 1457). Four years after the Battle of Bosworth Field in 1489, Sir Thomas Pilkington of Pilkington lost his estates by Royal Attainder to the Stanleys, who received the title 'Earl of Derby'. Sir Thomas Pilkington was granted Royal pardon in 1508

== Governance ==
Pilkington was formerly a township in the parish of Prestwich, Following the Poor Law Amendment Act 1834, Pilkington formed part of the Bury Poor Law Union. In 1866 Pilkington became a separate civil parish, a Local board of health was established for the Whitefield area of Pilkington, which had begun to urbanise and expand into a town in its own right. In 1885 part of Pilkington was merged into the Municipal Borough of Bury. Following the Local Government Act 1894, the parish of Pilkington was abolished to form Whitefield, Unsworth, Outwood, part also went to Bury and Radcliffe. In 1891 the parish had a population of 14,472.

== Geography ==
It was bounded on two sides, the southwest and north, by the River Irwell, and encompassed the settlements of Blackford Bridge, Cinder Hill, Hollins, Besses o' th' Barn, Outwood, Ringley, Stand, Unsworth, and Whitefield.

== See also ==
- Butterworth (ancient township)
- Church of St Mary the Virgin, Prestwich
