= Ringley =

Coordinates: 53.543°N 2.356°W

Ringley is on the east bank of the River Irwell near Kearsley in Greater Manchester, England. Its Anglican church is St Saviour's. Ringley is linked by road to Stoneclough by the A667 road which crosses the River Irwell on Ringley road bridge which is a short distance upstream from the 17th century Ringley Old Bridge.

== Ringley Old Bridge ==
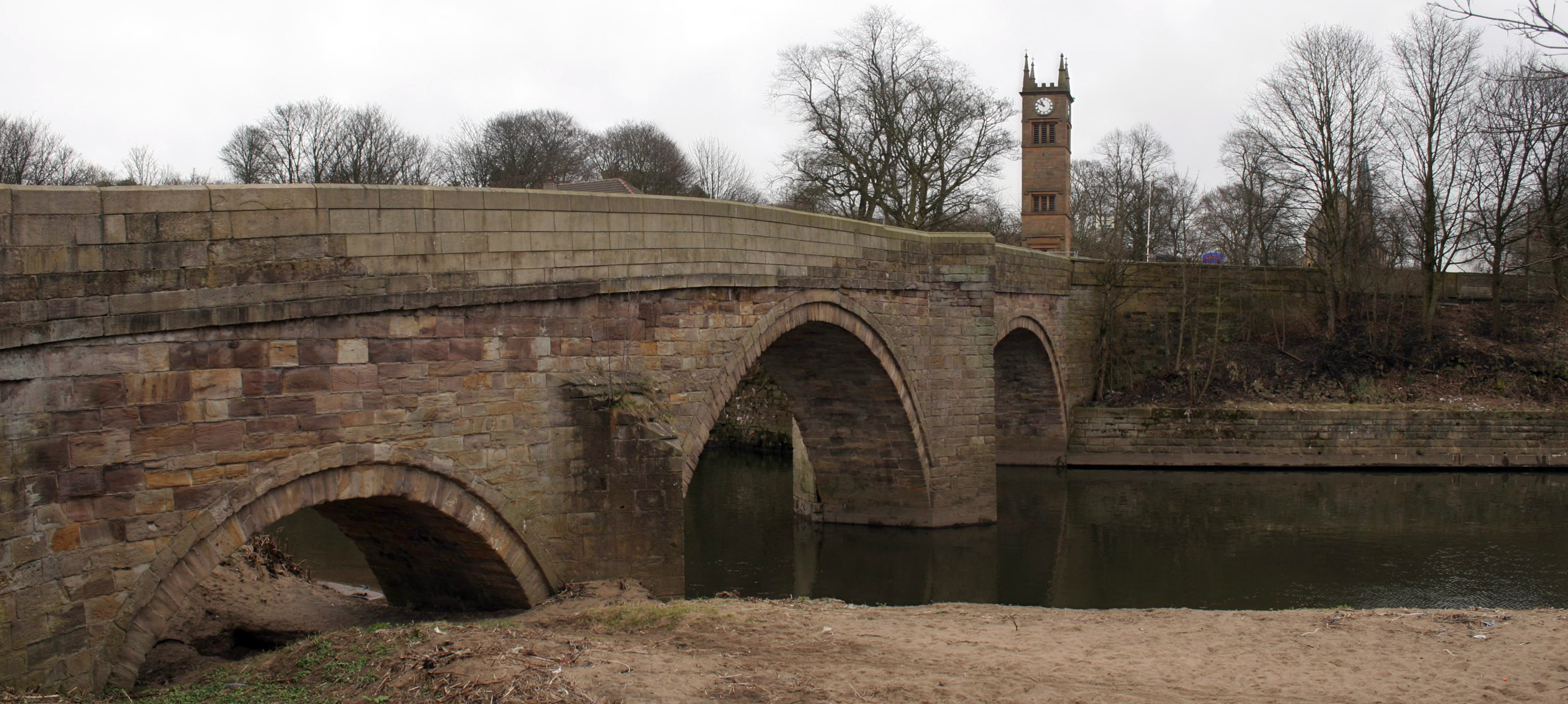
Ringley Old Bridge

Ringley is connected to Stoneclough across the River Irwell by Ringley Old Bridge which dates from the 17th century. Nowadays it is only in use for pedestrians and cyclists. Very close to the Ringley side of the bridge are the ancient village stocks. The bridge is a Grade II listed building.

== St Saviour's Church ==
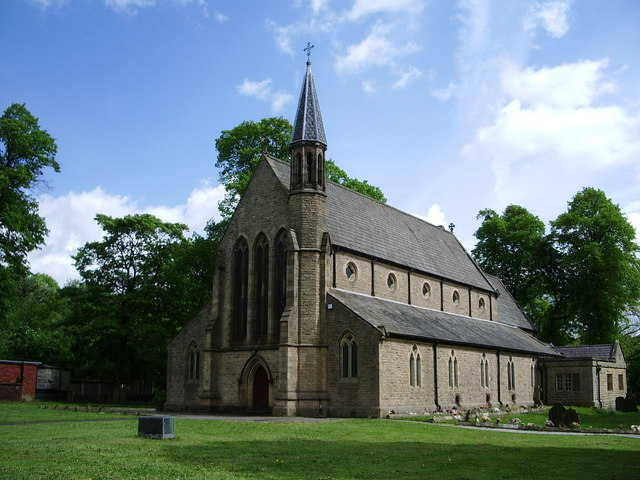
St Saviour's Church

St Saviour's Church stands close to the old bridge. Founded in 1625, the present building dates from 1854 and is a Grade II listed building.

== Primary school ==
St Saviour C.E. Primary School stands close to the church it is named after.

== Public house ==
Ringley has just one public house, the Horseshoe, which stands on Fold Road next to the church. The pub's origins go back as far as 300 years. It is owned by Blackburn's Thwaites Brewery and has an M26 postcode.

== See also ==
- Listed buildings in Kearsley
