= Prestolee =

Village in Greater Manchester

Coordinates: 53.547°N 2.370°W

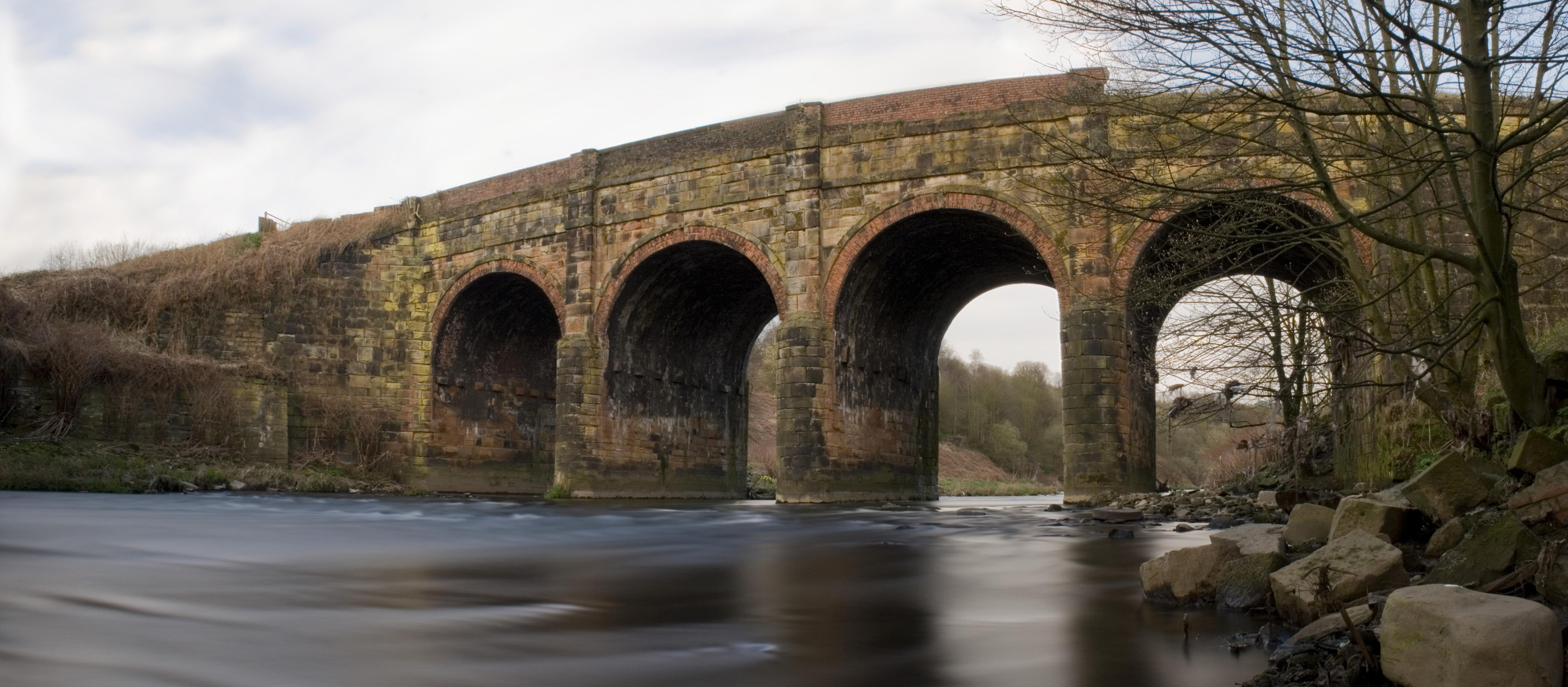
- Prestolee Aqueduct

- Location within Greater Manchester
- OS grid reference: SD754057
- Metropolitan borough: Bolton
- Metropolitan county: Greater Manchester
- Region: North West
- Country: England
- Sovereign state: United Kingdom
- Post town: MANCHESTER
- Postcode district: M26
- Dialling code: 01204
- Police: Greater Manchester
- Fire: Greater Manchester
- Ambulance: North West
- UK Parliament: Bolton South and Walkden

Prestolee is a small village in Kearsley, within the Metropolitan Borough of Bolton, in Greater Manchester, England. It lies on the River Irwell and is one of a cluster of villages between Bolton and Kearsley, which includes Stoneclough and Ringley. It is dubbed the "Island Village" as it is surrounded on all sides by water.

Historically part of Lancashire, during the Middle Ages, Prestolee was a chapelry within the ancient ecclesiastical parish of Prestwich-cum-Oldham. In Wilson's 1870–1872 Imperial Gazetteer of England and Wales it is described as having a population of about 1,600.

Prestolee is surrounded almost completely by water and is effectively an island, with the River Irwell to the north, west and south and the Manchester, Bolton and Bury Canal to the northeast. There is one road (Bridge Street) that provides vehicle access over the River Irwell. Prestolee Road also allows access to the village via a small canal bridge but the road is not metalled and not practical for most vehicles. Pedestrian access from the north is facilitated by using Prestolee Aqueduct, a grade II listed structure which carries the canal over the river, or the nearby Pack Horse Bridge. Prestolee Locks were on the Bury branch of the canal, which has been disused since a breach in 1936.

The area around Prestolee forms part of various countryside walks with particular focus upon the industrial heritage of this region. Not long ago the area was severely damaged by pollution but with the coming of the Clean Air Act and the demise of the cotton mills the river has once again regained its fish and other wildlife and wildflowers abound.

It has a grade II listed parish church (Holy Trinity). This was used by TV show Coronation Street as a venue for many weddings and known to fans as All Saints' Church, Weatherfield. It also has a primary school.

Another other major landmark is the grade II listed Kearsley Mill, a cotton spinning mill in its previous guise, now home to several industrial uses. It is described by English Heritage as "A near-complete example of an early C20 spinning mill designed specifically to be powered by electricity generated on site, by steam turbine generators." At one time there were also two other mills on the banks of the Irwell to the right of the road bridge from Stoneclough, though these mills were demolished in the 1970s to make way for housing. Prestolee has various shops in or just outside the village, including a greengrocer's, a chip shop (now a takeaway) and a sweet shop later becoming a butcher's before ending as a village community centre. There is a pub, the Grapes Hotel, to the Stoneclough end of the bridge and several others in the near vicinity.

Prestolee has a small primary school. The book The Idiot Teacher by Gerard Holmes tells the history of the school, run for very many years by Edward "Teddy" O'Neill (1890-1975), who believed children should be self-directed in their education.

Prestolee Wood is a small woodland (3 ha (7.4 acres)) owned by the Woodland Trust, beside the A667 road to the east of the village, north of the river and the canal.
