= Prestolee Aqueduct =

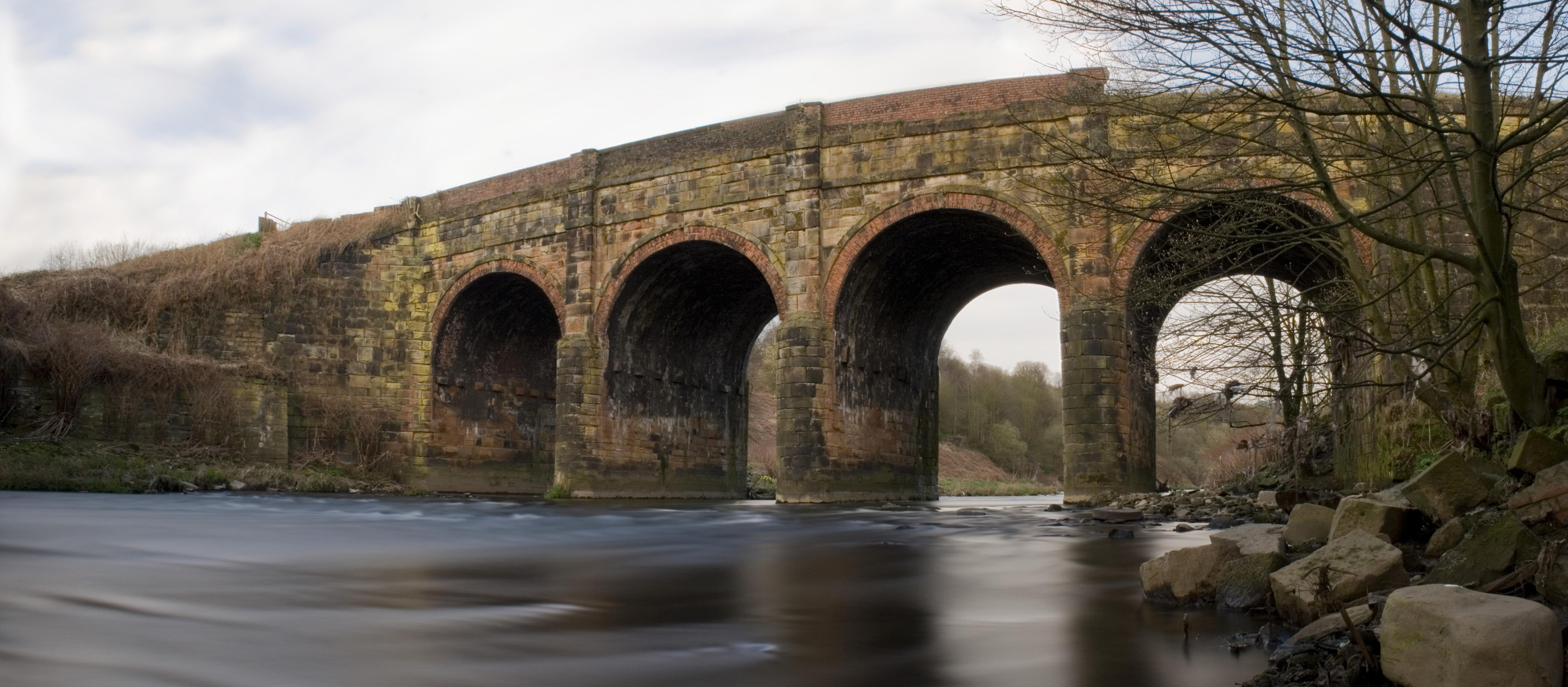
- Panorama of Prestolee Aqueduct
- Coordinates: 53.5525°N 2.3764°W
- OS grid reference: SD751062
- Carries: Manchester, Bolton and Bury Canal
- Crosses: River Irwell
- Locale: Prestolee, Greater Manchester
- Heritage status: Grade II

Characteristics
- Trough construction: Stone
- Pier construction: Stone
- Total length: 185 feet (56.4 m)
- Width: 16 feet 6 inches (5.03 m)
- Traversable?: Yes
- Towpaths: SW Side
- No. of spans: Four

History
- Construction end: 1793

Prestolee Aqueduct is a stone-built aqueduct in Prestolee, Kearsley in the Metropolitan Borough of Bolton, Greater Manchester, England. The four-arch structure was constructed in 1793 to carry the Manchester, Bolton and Bury Canal across the River Irwell. It is now preserved as a Grade II listed building.

The aqueduct is one of two remaining major structures on the canal, the other being the Clifton Aqueduct. A third major aqueduct, Damside Aqueduct, was demolished in the 1950s.

As of 2007, the aqueduct still carried water, although it was not navigable as adjoining sections of the canal are in need of restoration.

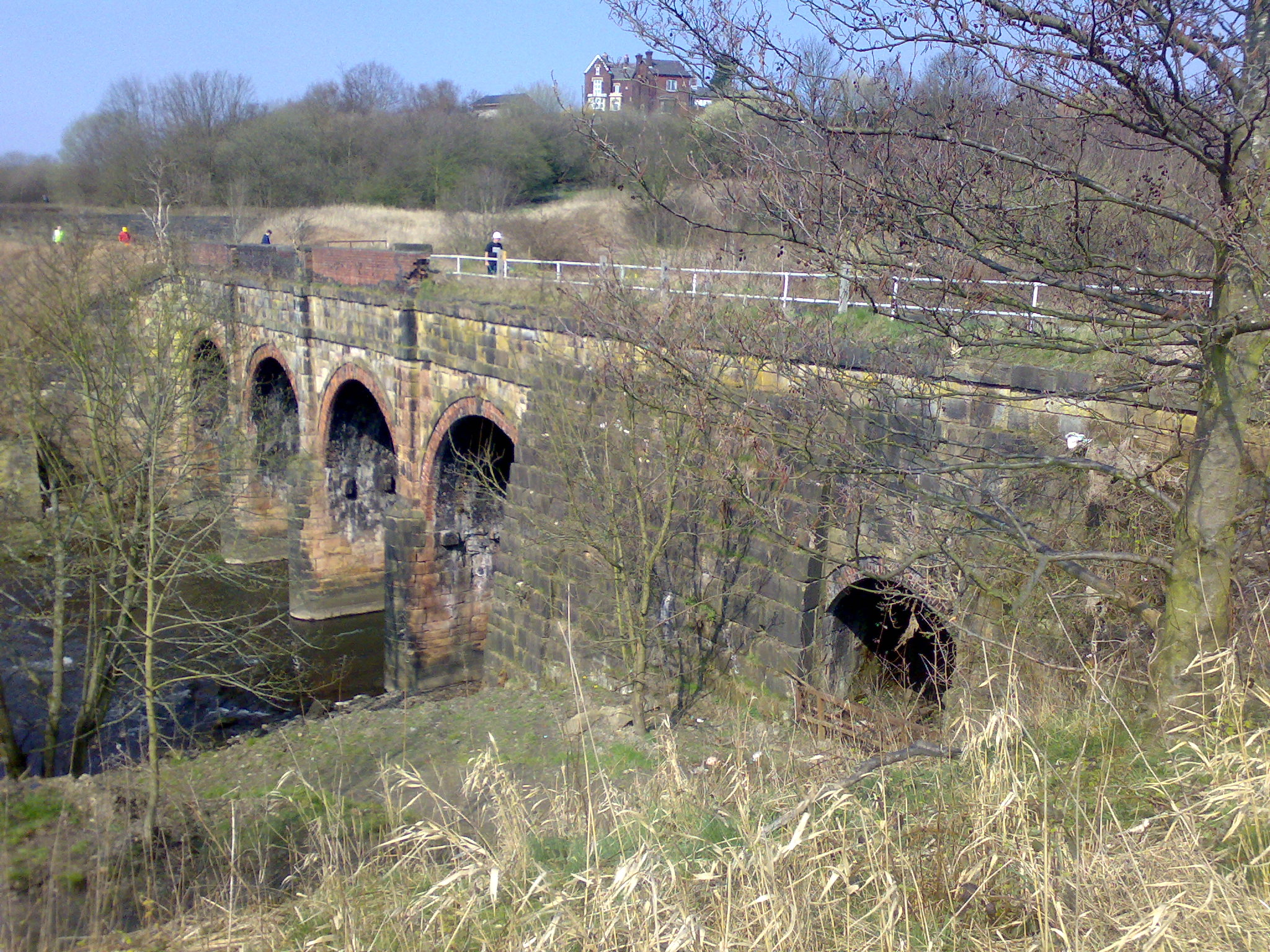
The Bolton arm of the canal runs underneath the house at the very top of this image, and is accessed via a set of locks

== See also ==
- List of aqueducts
- List of canal aqueducts in the United Kingdom
