= Richard Haworth Ltd =

UK company

- Website: www.richardhaworth.co.uk

Richard Haworth and Co. was established by Richard Haworth in 1854 as a cotton spinning and manufacturing firm in Cannon Street, Manchester, and Tatton Mill in Salford. Today the company is part of the Ruia Group which comprises a number of companies that import, supply and distribute textiles and hosiery to retailers and hospitality organisations. Richard Haworth Ltd. supplies a range of linens to the hospitality sector.

== History ==
Richard Haworth and Co was founded in c.1854. Richard Haworth, with Frederick Copley Hulton and James Craven, worked in partnership to begin trading as yarn and cloth commission agents in Cannon Street, Manchester. The partners then established a small weaving shed in Mount Street until, following a growth in demand, they expanded into spinning and leased a large mill at Broughton Bridge.

The company continued to prosper and expand, and by 1872 was working out of three large mills and weaving sheds; Egyptian Mill (1864), Tatton Mill (1870) and Ordsall Mill (1872). By 1900 the mills covered 13 acres and 150,000 spindles produced thread for 4,000 looms. The annual output for cloth reached 30,000,000 yards and the workforce reached 4000.

Richard Haworth died in 1883, and his two partners in 1886. Richard Haworth's sons, G and J Haworth, took control of the company. The company continued to thrive, converting to a limited liability company and, at its peak being considered first class example of how cotton mills should be operated, with the Manchester Guardian writing in 1883:

The mills of the firm, erected in various quarters of the city, are celebrated, not alone for their extent, but for the remarkable excellence of their arrangements and for the perfection of their machinery. Extraordinary provision is made in them for the physical comfort, the mental improvement, and the social recreation of the workpeople, in whom Mr. Haworth always evinced the warmest personal interest.

In 1951 Richard Haworth and Co Ltd was advertised for sale. It had grown from a cotton spinning a weaving firm to one offering a whole range of cotton and rayon fabrics under the trademark 'Spero'. By this time the company were working out of a large head office in Manchester and the Ordsall and Tatton mills and weaving sheds, a third location having been destroyed during the Manchester Blitz in 1940.

According to records held at Companies Office Manchester, Richard Haworth Ltd was purchased by Vantona textiles in 1953, and the Title 'Richard Haworth' subsequently purchased by the Ruia Group. The company, Richard Haworth, continues to manufacture and distribute textiles out of Kearsley Mill in Greater Manchester.

== Richard Haworth (1820–1883) ==
Born in March 1820, Richard was the youngest of eight children of George Haworth and his wife. He attended school until, at the age of seven, his father died and by the age of thirteen he secured a full-time job at Messrs Openshaw & Co of Bury, spinners and fustian manufacturers. One day whilst brushing a loom he injured his hand badly when it became caught in the machinery. To some extent this changed the course of his life. He later took a job as a weft lad and utilised his spare hours by attending a night school.

He continued to attend night school, showing an aptitude for mathematics and was transferred to the mill's basic accounts. According to records held in the national archives, when Haworth was eighteen he left to become a bookkeeper at Rylands Mill, Ainsworth, and later in 1843 became the official bookkeeper. During this time he had been developing his own business and decided to devote his time to his own business. His company and mills were recognised for their excellence and in addition to providing employment for thousands of mill workers and workplaces that placed an emphasis on safety, Richard Haworth felt it important to contribute to his local community and had a strong connection to the Wesleyan Methodist body.

"He took an active part in the lay home mission, assisting in the conduct of its services in Angel Meadow and in other of the poorest and most neglected parts of the town. He did a great deal to promote education amongst the middle class of Wesleyans by the establishment of boarding schools at Colwyn Bay and Rhyl." - Manchester Guardian, Obituaries of Richard Haworth 1883

Other achievements and public posts included Treasurer of the Hospital Sunday Fund, Chairman of the Equitable Fire Insurance Company, of which he was one of the original promoters, Chairman of the Lancashire and Yorkshire Accident Insurance Society, Treasurer of the Sunday Closing Fund, Justice of the peace for Manchester, Member of the Withington Local Board, Member of the first School Board in Manchester and Member of the Board of Management of the Royal Infirmary. Richard Haworth married Sarah Sewell in 1839 with whom he had six children; two girls and four boys. One of his sons became a Wesleyan minister at Teddington, Surrey; the other three, Messrs. George Chester Haworth, John Fletcher Haworth, and Fred Haworth, became active partners in the firm of Richard Haworth and Co and took responsibility for the company when Richard Haworth died at the age of 63, in 1883.

== Cultural context ==
Manchester and Lancashire mills became the largest, most productive cotton spinning centre in the world, responsible for 32% of global cotton production in 1871. In 1853, the number of cotton mills in Manchester peaked at 108. As the industrial centre began to decline, mills opened up in the surrounding towns of Bury, Oldham, Rochdale, and Bolton. This flourishing cotton manufacturing community came to be referred to as "Cottonopolis".

The British cotton industry reached its peak in 1912, producing eight billion yards of cloth. However, the war of 1914 had an enormous impact on Britain's staple industries; cotton could no longer be exported to foreign markets and, particularly in Japan, countries began to build their own factories. Soon, Japan introduced 24-hour cotton production and by 1933, became the world's largest cotton manufacturer. The demand for British cotton slumped and during this period 800 mills closed.

Despite these fluctuating patterns of manufacturing and trade, the company Richard Haworth built in the 1800s grew to a workforce of 4000 with an annual output of 30,000,000 yards of cloth, surviving until its sale in 1951.

== Legacy ==
Haworth's impact on the local area and importance in local history was recognised in 2012 by the Working Class Movement Library in Salford. With Lottery funding, the library launched their "Invisible Histories" project, investigating the realities of people's working lives during the period that Salford was an industrial powerhouse in the northwest. The research focusses on 3 historical workplaces, Agecroft Colliery, Ward & Goldstone and Richard Haworth's cotton mill. The study focuses on the Ordsall Lane mill which closed in the 1970s, and acknowledges the companies continued production of textiles. Several individuals who worked at, or had a connection with Richard Hawort's mills gave interviews which described their working experiences at this leading cotton company.

Peter Downing, who was interviewed by the 'Invisible Histories: Salford's Working Lives' team, worked as an apprentice joiner in Richard Haworth's mills and described Ordsall Lane mill as "A busy, busy mill" with "2000 workers there, maybe more, every room fully manned". He described it as "A great working environment, full of life... friendly and sociable".

== Bibliography ==
- Williams, M. Farnie, D. (1992) Cotton Mills in Greater Manchester. Preston: Carnegie ltd
- R. Mc Neil and M. Nevell (2000) AIA Guide to the Industrial Archaeology of Manchester
- Hartwell, C. Hyde, M. Pevsner, N. (2004) Lancashire: Manchester and the South-East. Yale University Press
- Gurr, D. Hunt, J (1998) The cotton mills of Oldham. Oldham Education & Leisure Services.
- Palliser, D. Clark, P. Daunton, M (2000) The Cambridge Urban History of Britain, Volume 3., Cambridge University Press, p. 378.
