= Kearsley Mill =

Cotton mill in Greater Manchester, England

Coordinates: 53.5475°N 2.3764°W

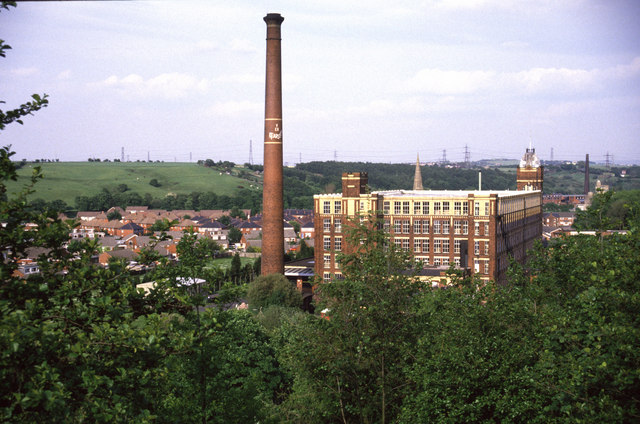
- Kearsley Mill, Prestolee. A Grade II listed building with an exceptional chimney.

Cotton
- Architectural style: Edwardian
- Location: Prestolee, Kearsley, Greater Manchester, England
- Owner: Richard Haworth Ltd Est (1876)

Construction
- Floor area: 240,000 sq ft (22,000 m^{2})

Kearsley Mill is a 240,000 sq ft (22,000 m^{2}), late period cotton mill located in the small village of Prestolee in Kearsley, Greater Manchester, part of the historic county of Lancashire. A near complete example of Edwardian mill architecture, the building now functions as headquarters for a number of businesses and is still used in the continued manufacturing and distribution of textiles by Richard Haworth Ltd Est (1876), part of the Ruia Group. The mill is a Grade II listed building.

== Location ==
Kearsley Mill is one of over 100 mills which were built in Lancashire when industry was booming in the 19th and early 20th century. The confluence of the River Croal and Irwell in the valley of Prestolee and Ringley created the ideal location for early industry to develop, as described in 1911, ‘a busy industrial place. There are collieries, iron foundries, paper mills, powerloom mills, spindle works, and chemical works; bricks and tiles are made and cotton-spinning carried on’.

== Architecture ==
Mills of this period were large, their decoration was lavish reflecting Edwardian taste and prosperity. Kearsley Mill was no exception. During the 19th Century, spinning mill architecture developed from the narrow section, pitched roof design to the five and six storied, rectangular flat roofed outlines with large paned windows. The machinery was driven by shafting from an adjacent engine and boiler house as seen in the Kearsley Spinning Mill which employed both turbine driven generators and electric motor driven machinery.

The Mill had 24 bays for mule spinning machines, large paned windows were installed for light and the mill was innovatively designed and constructed using fireproof materials; floors made from reinforced concrete, supported with interior cast-iron columns and rolled steel beams".

== Power ==
Kearsley Mill is a good example of a mill that generated electricity from its own steam turbines. Powered by electricity which was generated on site, the group drive system allowed each electrical motor to drive a group of machines via line shafting.

"The early cotton mills combined both hand and water powered machinery, then, as the size of mills increased, steam powered bean and horizontal engines replaced the water wheel. These engines were, in the latter half of the 18th century, of compound design with the high pressure steam passing into two, three or four cylinders of increasing diameter to take full advantage of the expensive force of the steam powered electric motor drives for mill machinery as exemplified in the Kearsley Spinning Co of Prestolee".

== History ==
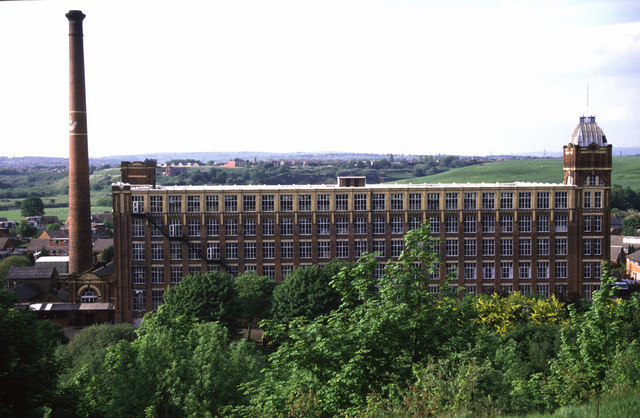
Kearsley Mill viewed from the south

The cotton industry boomed and prospered between 1895 and 1910 due, in part, to legislative changes which enabled companies to amalgamate in order to promote continued growth. Kearsley Mill was one of many mills which opened across Lancashire during this time. In the years between 1850 and 1900, for example, approximately 50 new mills were recorded to be built in the Farnworth/Kearsley area, and more in the surrounding area.

Construction of the Kearsley Mill began in 1905, when the first sod was cut for its foundations. Developed for the Kearsley Spinning Company, the mill represented the culmination of decades of industrial development in the textile field, both architecturally and mechanically.

Messrs W Brown of Manchester were contracted to direct the construction of the Mill having overseen the construction of the prestigious Manchester's Midland Hotel in 1903, a monument to the Midland Railway directors.

With construction complete in March 1906, the mill's flag was flying by April and with equipment and machinery supplied by The Electric Co of London and Messrs Hetherington's of Manchester, by September production was underway.

Initially, the mill thrived, set in a location described as the ‘industrial powerhouse’ of England at the time, and which was generally recognised as the heart of northern England and its industries*. The mill was part of a thriving industrial community which soon became dubbed "cottonopolis".

However, the mill's prosperity was only to be short-lived as the cotton industry peaked in 1907 and then experienced a severe slump between 1908 and 1911. Many spinning companies and cotton mills were forced out of business, particularly as the later war of 1914 continued to impact Britain's staple industries as demand for exports dropped. Circumstances put the Lancashire cotton textile industry into reverse and Kearsley Spinning Company closed down in 1912. Reconstituted after the war as Kearsley Spinning Co (1920), it was absorbed into Combined Egyptian Mills Ltd. When Kearsley Spinning Co closed down in 1965, the mill was bought by Ruia Holdings, who trade under the name of Richard Howarth Ltd, a title acquired from Vantona Textiles.

== Grade II Listing ==
Between 1985 and 1991 the Royal Commission on the Historical Monuments of England (RCHME) and the greater Manchester Archaeological Unit (GMAU) undertook a survey to identify and record all surviving textile mills within Greater Manchester. This was instigated by a report by Roger Tym and Partners which identified a large volume of vacant space in old industrial buildings, and recommended refurbishment, reuse or demolition of these buildings. Following the review, in 1994, Kearsley Mill was listed as a Grade II building under the Planning (Listed Buildings and Conservation Areas) Act 1990 as amended for its special architectural or historic interest.

"Cotton spinning mill. 1904-1908. For the Kearsley Spinning Company. Red brick, cream brick top storey and detailing; of steel framed and concrete construction, comprised of rolled steel beams encased in plaster or concrete. The complex is comprised of a single tall rectangular block of 5 storeys, above a basement. At the south-east corner, a stair tower with integral water tank, below a domed roof - the lower corners embellished with pilasters. Full-height chimney to north-west with white lettering V/ER/KEARSLEY. Single storey block to west, with tall, round-arched window, formerly engine house and range of offices. A near-complete example of an early C20 spinning mill designed specifically to be powered by electricity generated on site, by steam turbine generators. The electrical motors were housed in an attached projecting tower and the mill was powered by a group drive system, each electrical motor driving a group of machines via line shafting". – Historic England Records

== See also ==
- Listed buildings in Kearsley
- List of mills in Bolton

== Bibliography ==
- De Jong, K. and Van Balen, K (2002) Preparatory Architectural Investigation in the Restoration of Historical Buildings. Leuven University Press
- Hartwell, C. Hyde, M. Pevsner, N. (2004) Lancashire: Manchester and the South-East. Yale University Press
- Gurr, D. Hunt, J (1998) The cotton mills of Oldham. Oldham Education & Leisure Services.
- Palliser, D. Clark, P. Daunton, M (2000) The Cambridge Urban History of Britain, Volume 3., Cambridge University Press, p. 378
- Williams, M. Farnie, D. (1992) Cotton Mills in Greater Manchester. Preston: Carnegie Ltd p. 120
- Farrer, W. and Brownbill, J. (1911) Townships: Kearsley. A History of the County of Lancashire, Volume 5 p. 39
- Holland, E (2014) Edwardian England: A Guide to Everyday Life 1900-1914, Plum Bun
- Holden, Roger N. (1998), Stott & Sons : architects of the Lancashire cotton mill, Lancaster: Carnegie
