= Bury Rural District =

Former local government area in the UK

Coordinates: 53.593°N 2.299°W

Bury was a rural district in Lancashire, England from its establishment in 1894 under the Local Government Act 1894, until its abolition in 1933. The district consisted of a number of rural civil parishes near Bury, but did not include Bury itself. It was a successor to the Bury Rural Sanitary District.

It originally included Tottington, which was made an urban district of its own in 1899

In its later form, the district consisted of five parishes split between four disconnected fragments (exclaves), which were north-east (Birtle cum Bamford and Walmersley cum Shuttleworth), south (Unsworth), south-west (Outwood) and west (Ainsworth) of Bury itself.

The district was abolished and its parishes split up between various urban districts in 1933, under the review caused by the Local Government Act 1929. Since 1974 the area forms parts of the Borough of Rossendale, Metropolitan Borough of Rochdale and Metropolitan Borough of Bury.
