= Outwood, Greater Manchester =

Coordinates: 53.5492°N 2.3332°W

Outwood
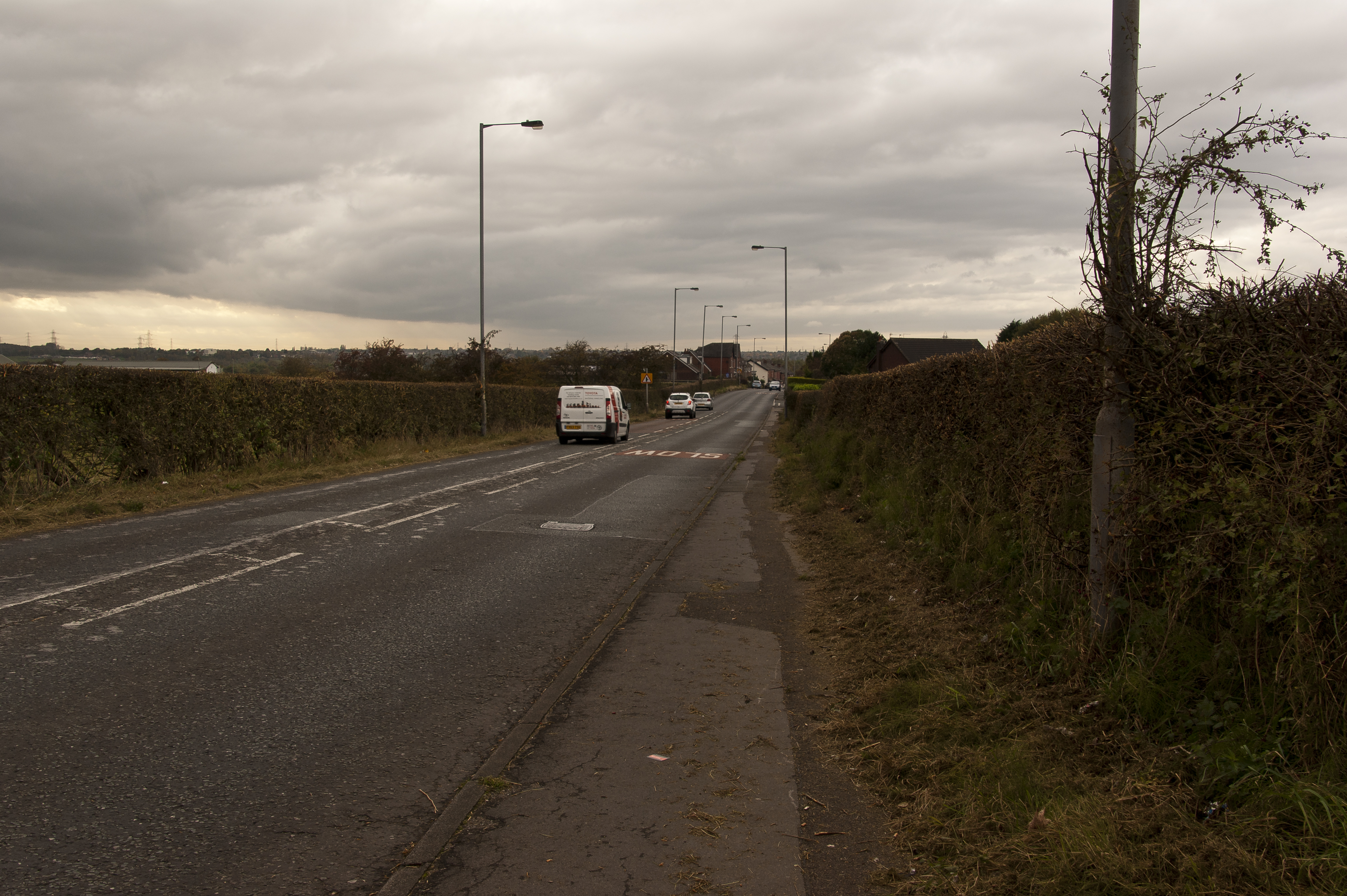
- The A567 west towards Outwood

- Location within Greater Manchester
- Metropolitan borough: Bury
- Metropolitan county: Greater Manchester
- Region: North West
- Country: England
- Sovereign state: United Kingdom
- Post town: MANCHESTER
- Postcode district: M26
- Dialling code: 0161
- Police: Greater Manchester
- Fire: Greater Manchester
- Ambulance: North West
- UK Parliament: Bury South

Outwood is a suburban area in the metropolitan borough of Bury, in the county of Greater Manchester, England. It neighbours the market town Radcliffe that is connected to the suburb via Outwood Road. Until 1974 it was in Lancashire.

== History ==
Outwood
- Area
  - 1901: 1,938 acres (7.8 km^{2})
  - 1931: 1,938 acres (7.8 km^{2})
- Population
  - 1901: 1,514
  - 1931: 2,195
- History
  - Created: 1894
  - Abolished: 1933
  - Succeeded by: Kearsley, Radcliffe and Whitefield urban districts
- Status: Civil parish

Outwood was an area in the township of Pilkington in the ancient parish of Prestwich-cum-Oldham in the historic county of Lancashire. It was once called Outwood of Pilkington and is marked as Outwoods on the Yates Map of 1787 and on the later Greenwood and Hennet maps.

Under the Local Government Act 1894, Outwood was established as a civil parish and became part of the Bury Rural District in the administrative county of Lancashire, England. In 1933, Outwood civil parish was abolished and its former area was divided between Kearsley, Radcliffe and Whitefield parishes and urban districts. In 1931 the civil parish had a population of 2195.
