= Kearsley =

Town in Bolton, Greater Manchester, England

Coordinates: 53.53°N 2.37°W

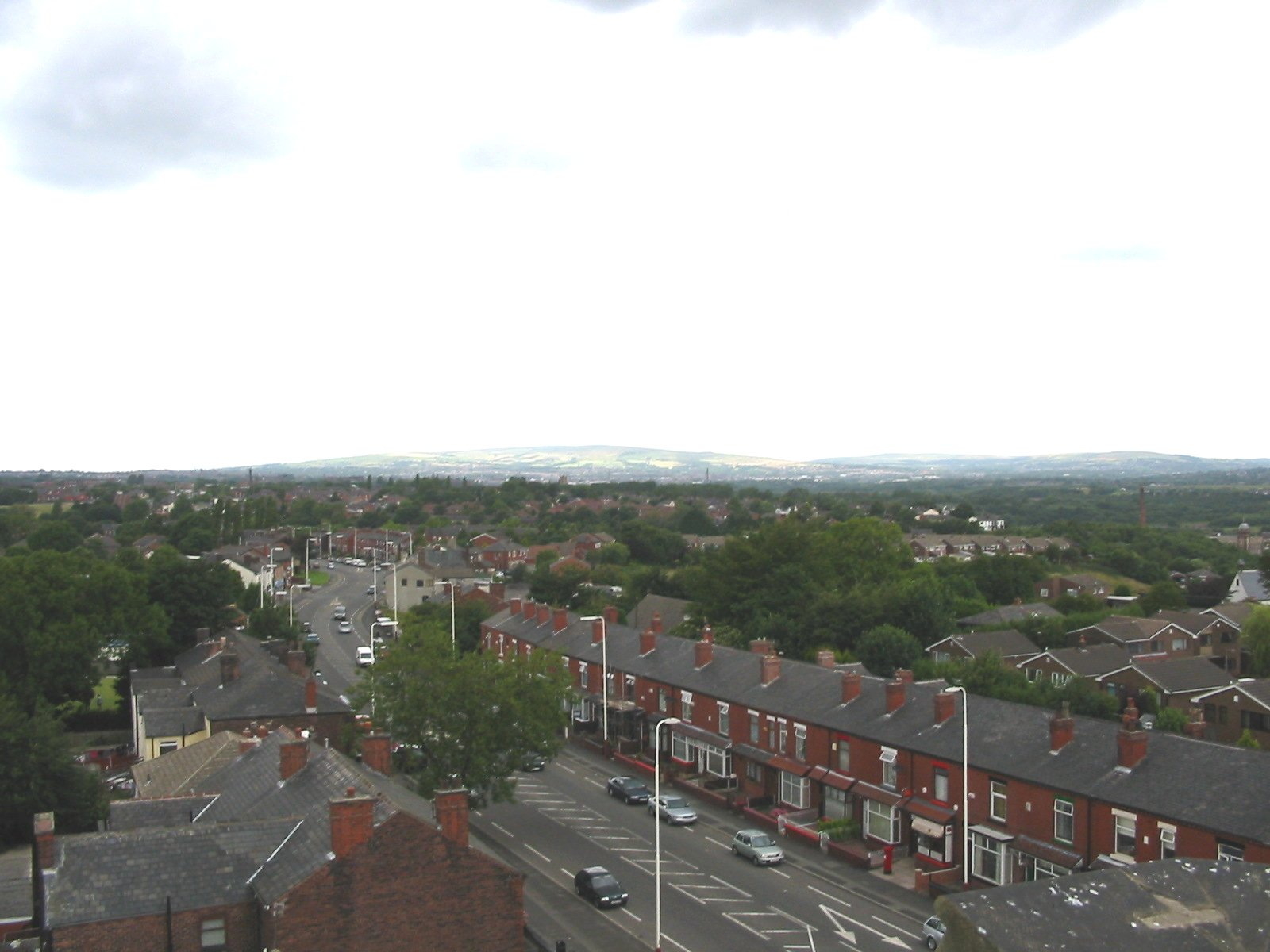
- Kearsley looking north from St Stephen's Church tower

- Location within Greater Manchester
- Population: 14,212 (2011.Ward)
- OS grid reference: SD755055
- Metropolitan borough: Bolton
- Metropolitan county: Greater Manchester
- Region: North West
- Country: England
- Sovereign state: United Kingdom
- Post town: BOLTON
- Postcode district: BL4
- Dialling code: 01204
- Police: Greater Manchester
- Fire: Greater Manchester
- Ambulance: North West
- UK Parliament: Bolton South and Walkden

Kearsley (/ˈkɜːrzli/ KURZ-lee) is a town in the Metropolitan Borough of Bolton, Greater Manchester, England. The population at the 2011 census was 14,212. Within the Historic County of Lancashire, it lies 7 miles (11 km) northwest of Manchester, 5 miles (8 km) southwest of Bury and 3.5 miles (6 km) south of Bolton.

It is bounded to the west by Walkden, the east by Whitefield, the north by Farnworth and the south by Clifton.

Kearsley was a township in the ancient ecclesiastical parish of Deane, in the Hundred of Salford. Kearsley Urban District was a local government authority from 1894 until 1974. In 1933, part of Clifton was added to Kearsley Urban District. Part of Outwood, Radcliffe became part of Kearsley in line with the 1933 Lancashire Review.

== History ==
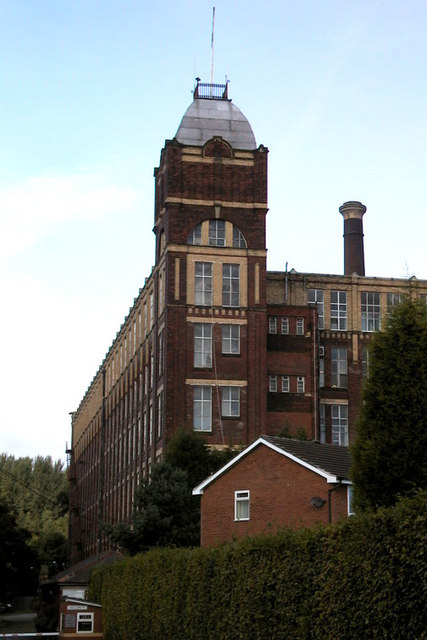
Kearsley Mill, a former textile mill at Stoneclough.

Kearsley lay within the historic county boundaries of Lancashire and was industrialised by 1752 when James Brindley solved drainage problems at the Wet Earth Colliery on the borders of Kearsley and Clifton. In 1780, a mill was built at the point where the River Croal meets the River Irwell In 1830 it was described as:

"Kersley, a township in the parish of Deane, Hundred of Salford, 7 miles N.W. from Manchester. Inhabitants 1,833. In this township is Kearsley Moor, an extensive common, under the surface of which there are many valuable coalmines".

In the Industrial Revolution a papermill, cotton mills, chemical works, an iron foundry, a quarry and 15 coal mines operated within its boundaries.

In the mid-19th century, the area was a busy coal mining area. Several street names such as Moss Colliery Road (in nearby Clifton) bear testimony to this. The largest coal mine was the Unity Brook Colliery. On 12 March 1878, an explosion in the mine killed 43 men and boys and 19 of the dead were buried at the parish church. By 1900 the coal mining industry had all but disappeared.

In 1929, the coal-fired Kearsley Power Station was built. It used water for cooling from the River Irwell. The power station closed on 27 October 1980, and the 5 cooling towers were demolished during the week of 14 May 1985. The power station had a railway connection, which has been removed and is now a pedestrian trail.

== Economy ==
Today, Kearsley has little industry; the only remaining mill is now a multi occupancy building housing retail and light engineering. Three small industrial estates are concerned mainly with the transport industry. They are the Europa Industrial Estate and the Fishbrook Industrial Estate on Stoneclough Road and the Lion Industrial Estate on Moss Road.

There is a small shopping precinct and some isolated shops along Manchester Road (A666).

== Transport ==
The A666 from Manchester to Bolton passes through Kearsley. Today it lies on the A666 at a point where the Kearsley Roundabout connects it and Farnworth to the M61 motorway via the Kearsley Spur link road.

Kearsley railway station is on Stoneclough Road, from where there is a service northbound to Bolton and southbound to Manchester. In 1878, the mineral railway line to Kearsley was opened, at a cost of £100.

Kearsley is on a bus route from Bolton to Manchester. In earlier days, it was a tram route. On 3 June 1881, trams ran the full length of the system: Town Hall Square, Bolton to Farnworth and Kearsley.

== Religion ==
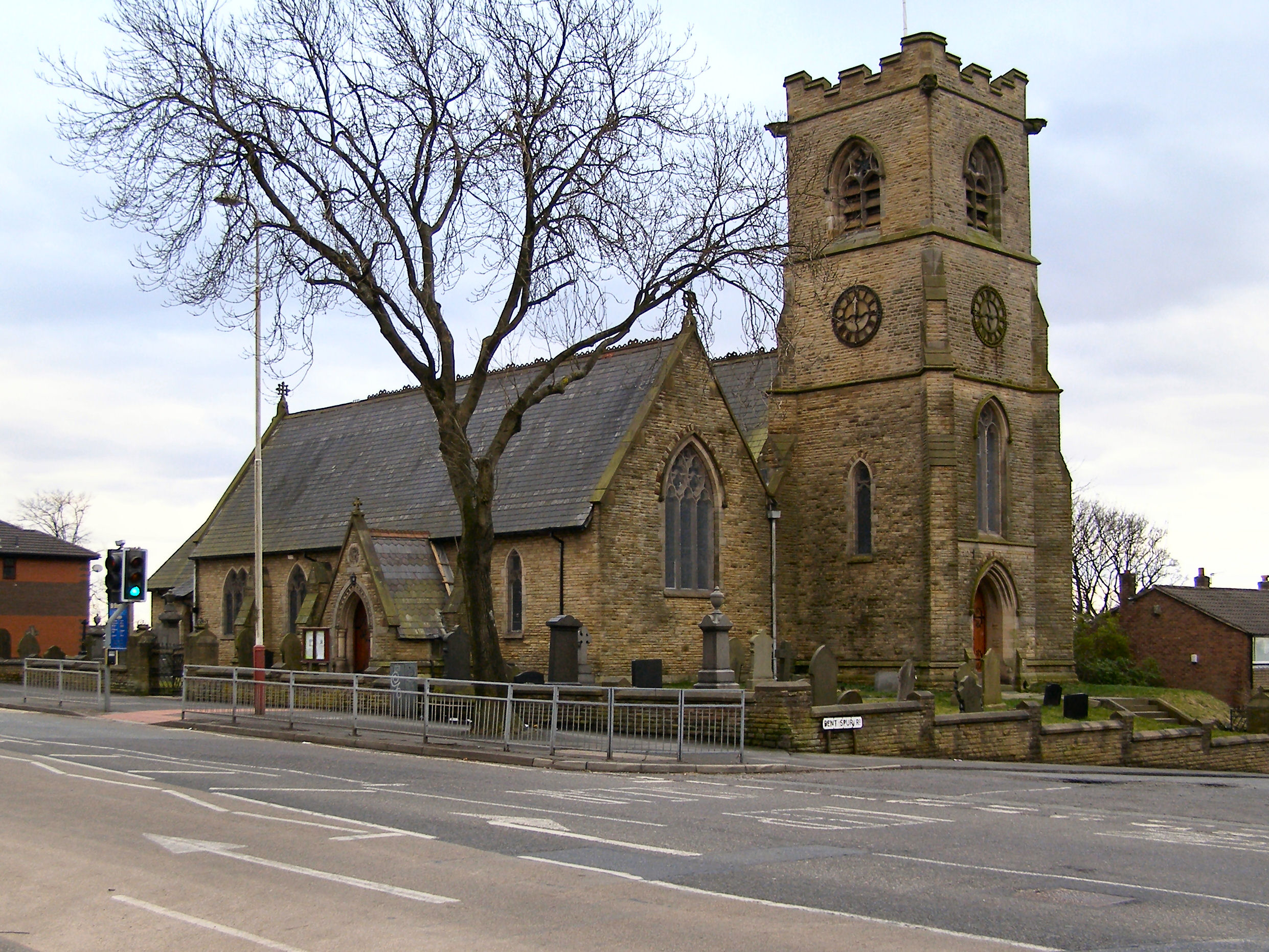
St Stephen's Church, Kearsley

St Stephen's Church, Kearsley Moor, the parish church is on Manchester Road. The Anglican church was the vision of Harrison Blair who owned the chemical works at Moss Lane. The church has a graveyard which holds the remains of 19 miners killed in the Unity Brook Colliery disaster. The church was founded in 1870, erected in 1870–71 by the family of the Harrison Blair who died before it was finished. It cost £3,600 and has seating for 538 parishioners. The Bishop of Manchester, Dr Fraser consecrated the church on 1 July 1871.

A United Reformed church was founded before 1890, but is now closed. The New Jerusalem Church on Bolton Road (founded in 1836) has a disused graveyard. St John Fisher Roman Catholic Church was founded in 1969 on Manchester Road. Kearsley Mount Methodist Church was founded in 1836 and a Wesleyan Sunday School was built overlooking the Irwell Valley opposite the parish church. The first chapel was built in 1870. In 1914, it was demolished due to mining subsidence and the present building was opened in 1916. A Wesleyan day school was built next to the church in 1879 and was extended in 1890. The school was demolished in 2009 and replaced by a block of flats by St Vincent's Housing Association.

After two years planning and ten months building, the Schoenstatt Shrine was dedicated on 1 October 2000 by Bishop Terence Brain the Bishop of Salford. The opening was attended by visitors from Mexico, Australia and South America and Schoenstatt members from Ireland, Scotland and Germany.

In February 2022 the local Thai Buddhist Temple was given permission to expand its site.

== Education ==
Schools in Kearsley are under the control of Bolton Education Department.

The area originally had two nursery schools, Rompers, a private nursery that took 33 children, and Spindle Point School. In 2009, Rompers Nursery was demolished for a housing development project. On Sunday 3 January 2010, the luxury flat site was on fire for several hours.

There are four primary schools, all under the direction of Bolton Education: Kearsley West Primary School (pupils 249 Ofsted Id 105/105186, Dfes Number 2061), St John's Church of England Primary School (pupils 176 Ofsted Id 105/105241, Dfes Number 3355), Spindle Point School (pupils 247 Ofsted Id 105/105196, Dfes Number 2075) and the church attached St Stephen's Church of England Primary School (pupils 222, Ofsted Id 105/105240, Dfes Number: 3354).

There is one secondary school in Kearsley, Kearsley Academy formerly known as George Tomlinson School, after George Tomlinson, Secretary for Education at the time of its construction, on Springfield Road. (Pupils 541, Ofsted Id 105/105268, Dfes Number: 5402). Its original age range was 11–16 years of age, but with the introduction of a sixth form in 2012, it now serves pupils up to 18 years of age and allows both male and female pupils.

== Political ==
Kearsley falls under the Kearsley electoral ward of Bolton Borough Council and the parliamentary constituency of Bolton South and Walkden.

== Gallery ==
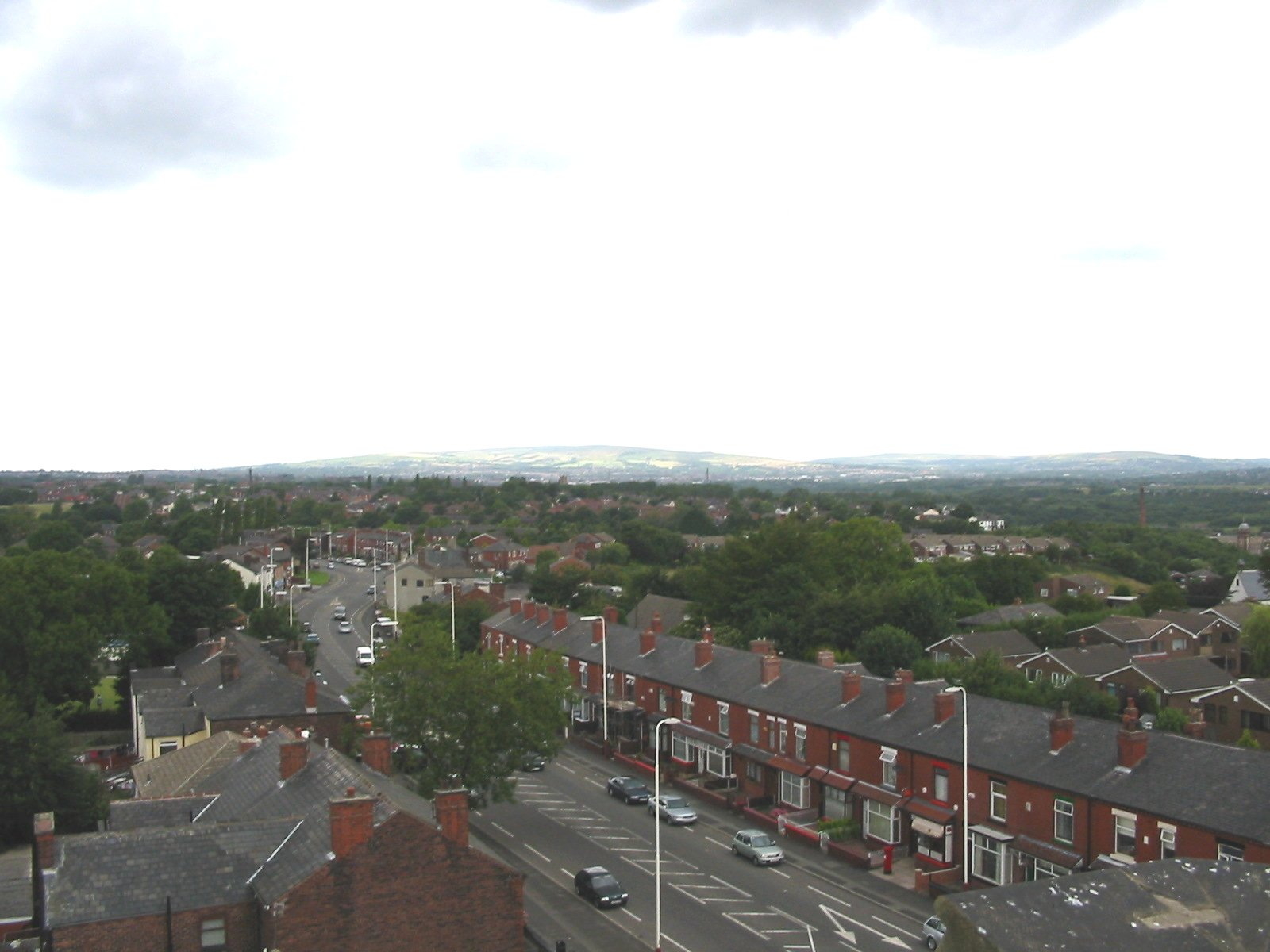
Kearsley looking north, taken from St Stephen's Church tower

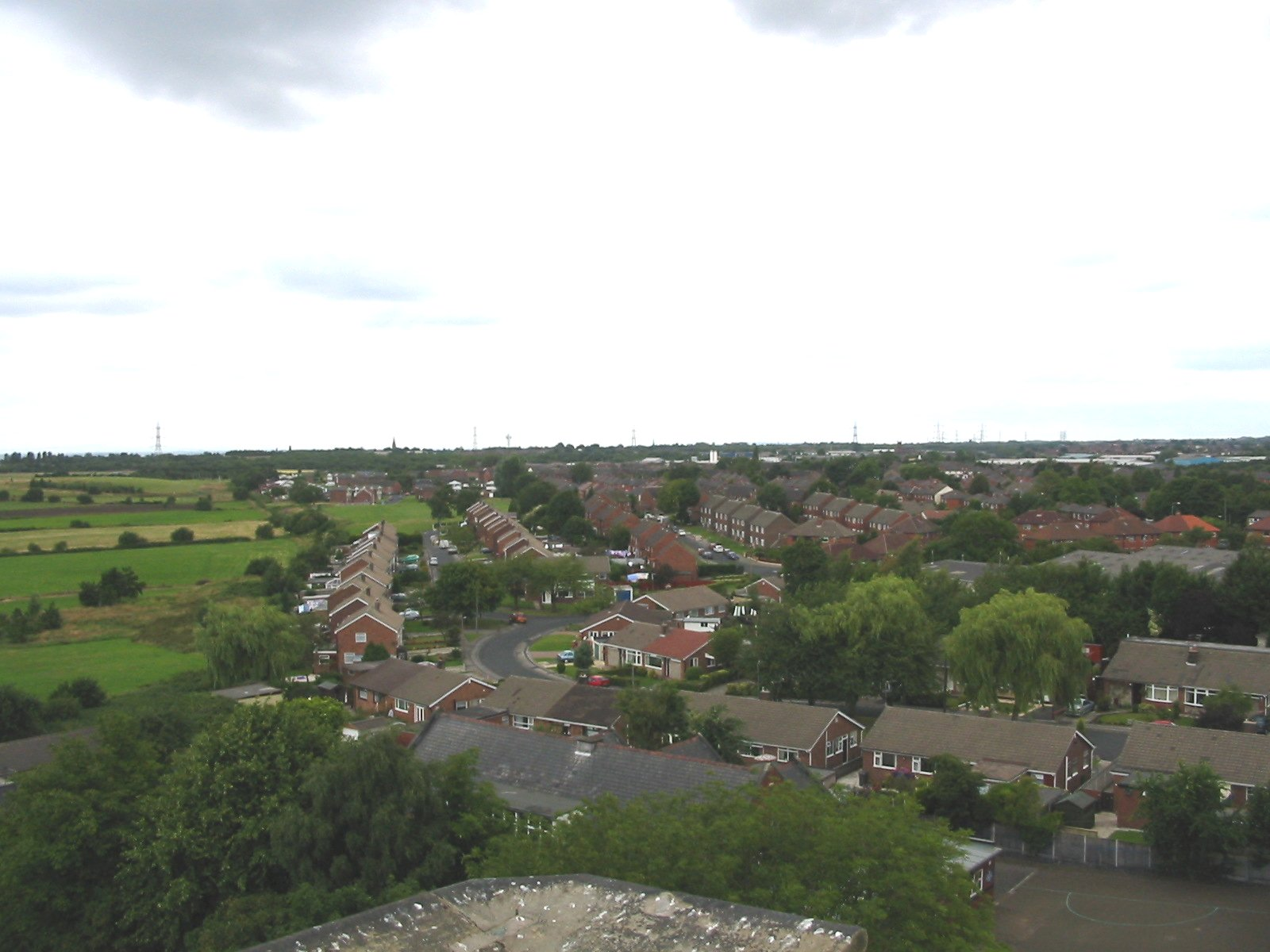
Kearsley looking west, taken from St Stephen's Church tower

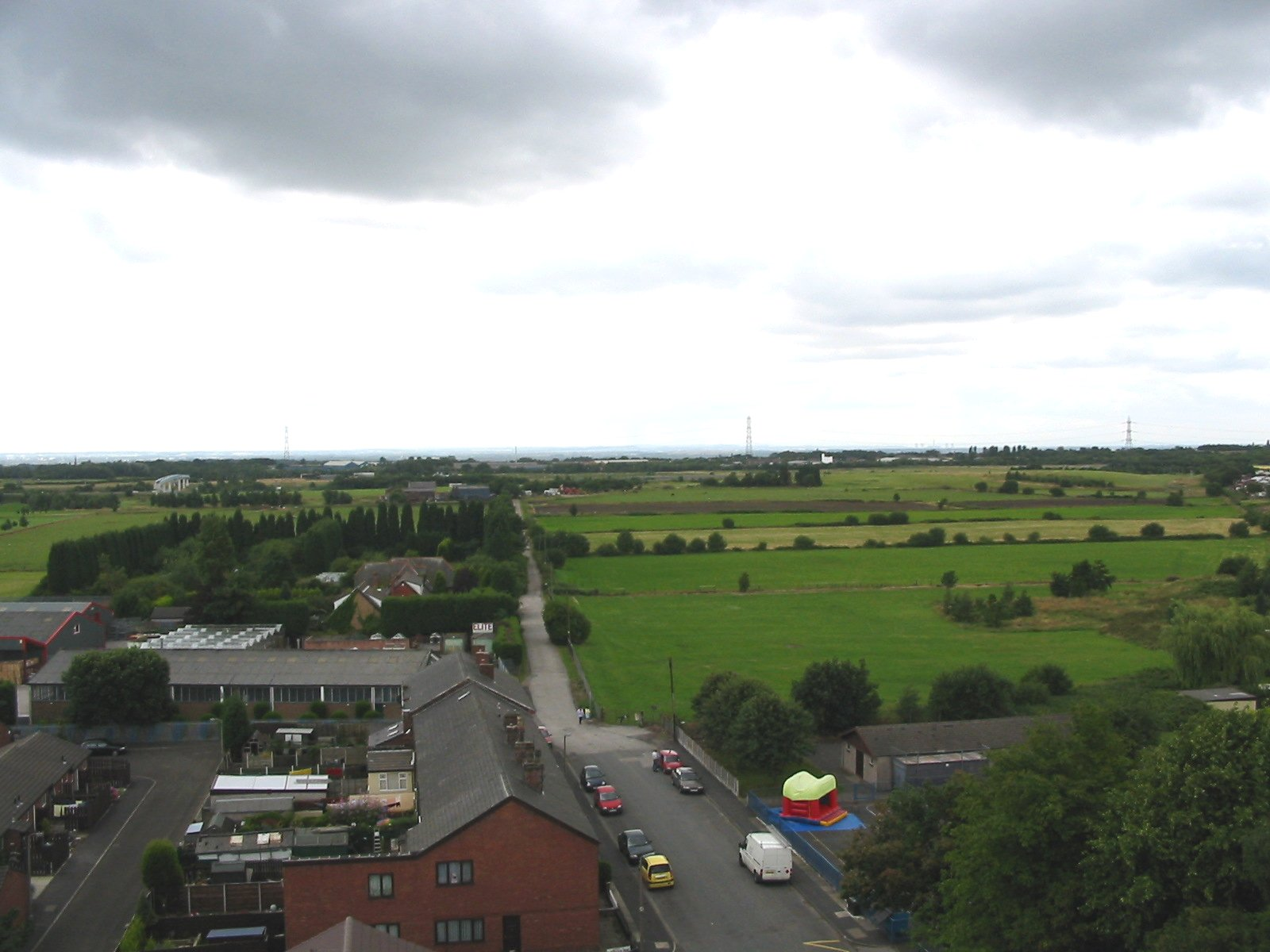
Kearsley looking south, taken from St Stephen's Church tower

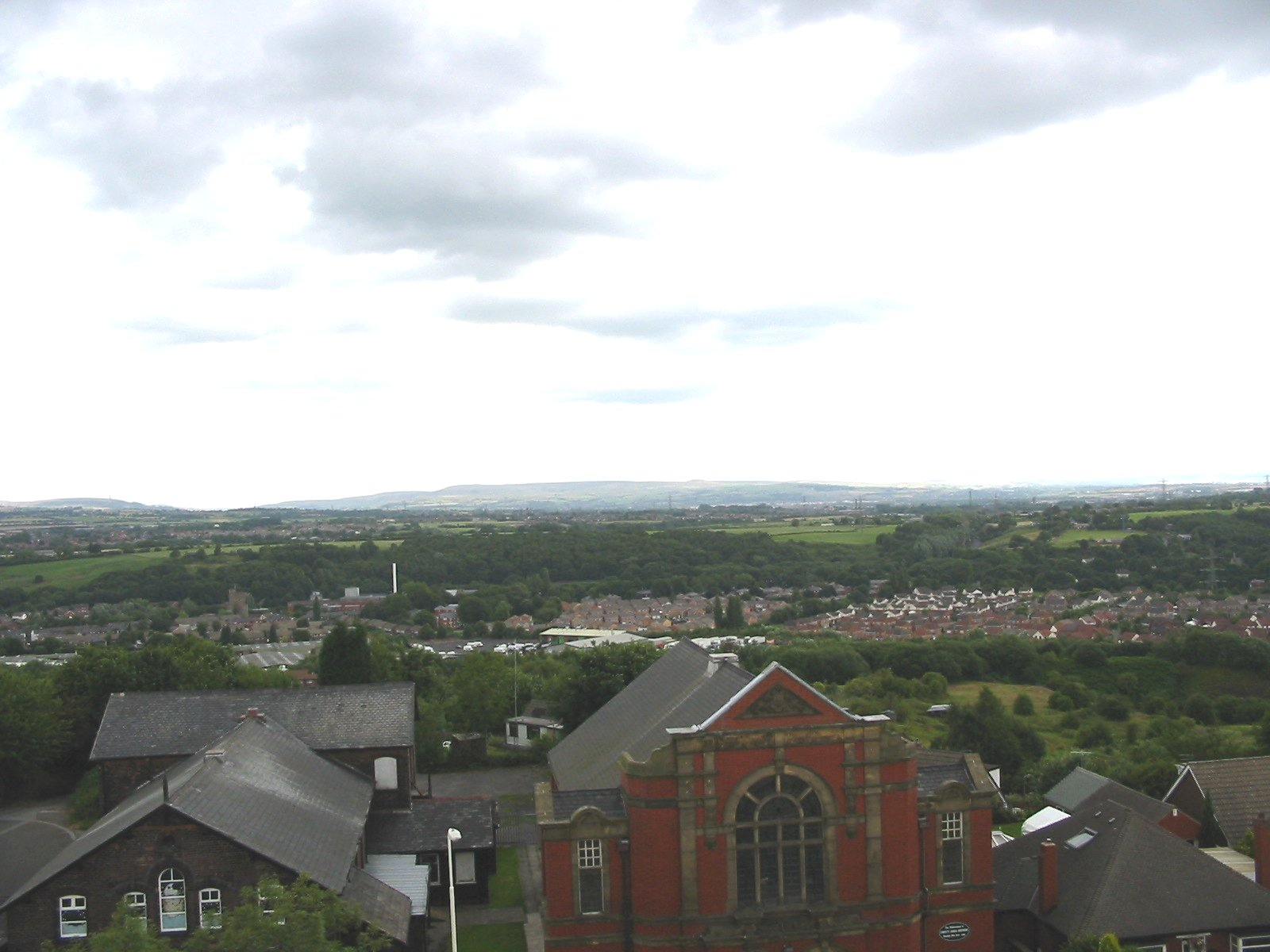
Kearsley looking east, taken from St Stephen's Church tower

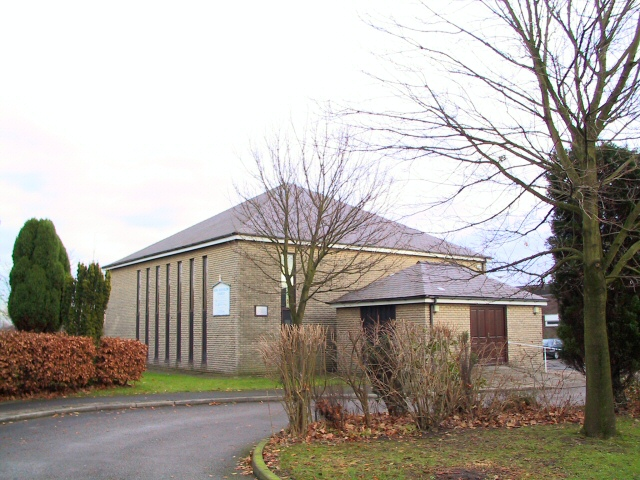
New Jerusalem church

== Notable people ==
- Samuel Lomax (1872–1944), a British trade unionist and politician who served as the Mayor of Bolton.
- Ian Ramsey (1915–1972), an Anglican bishop and academic, and Bishop of Durham from 1966 until his death.
- Neil Shawcross (born 1940), an artist; he paints still life with a self-consciously childlike approach to composition and colour.

=== Sport ===
- Thomas Mort (1897–1967), an English footballer who played 337 games for Aston Villa and 3 for England
- Jack Bond (1932–2019), an English cricketer who played 362 First-class cricket games
- Joe Hayes (1936–1999), an English footballer who played 331 games for Manchester City

== See also ==
- Listed buildings in Kearsley
- List of mining disasters in Lancashire
