= Manchester Bolton & Bury Reservoir =

Elton Reservoir
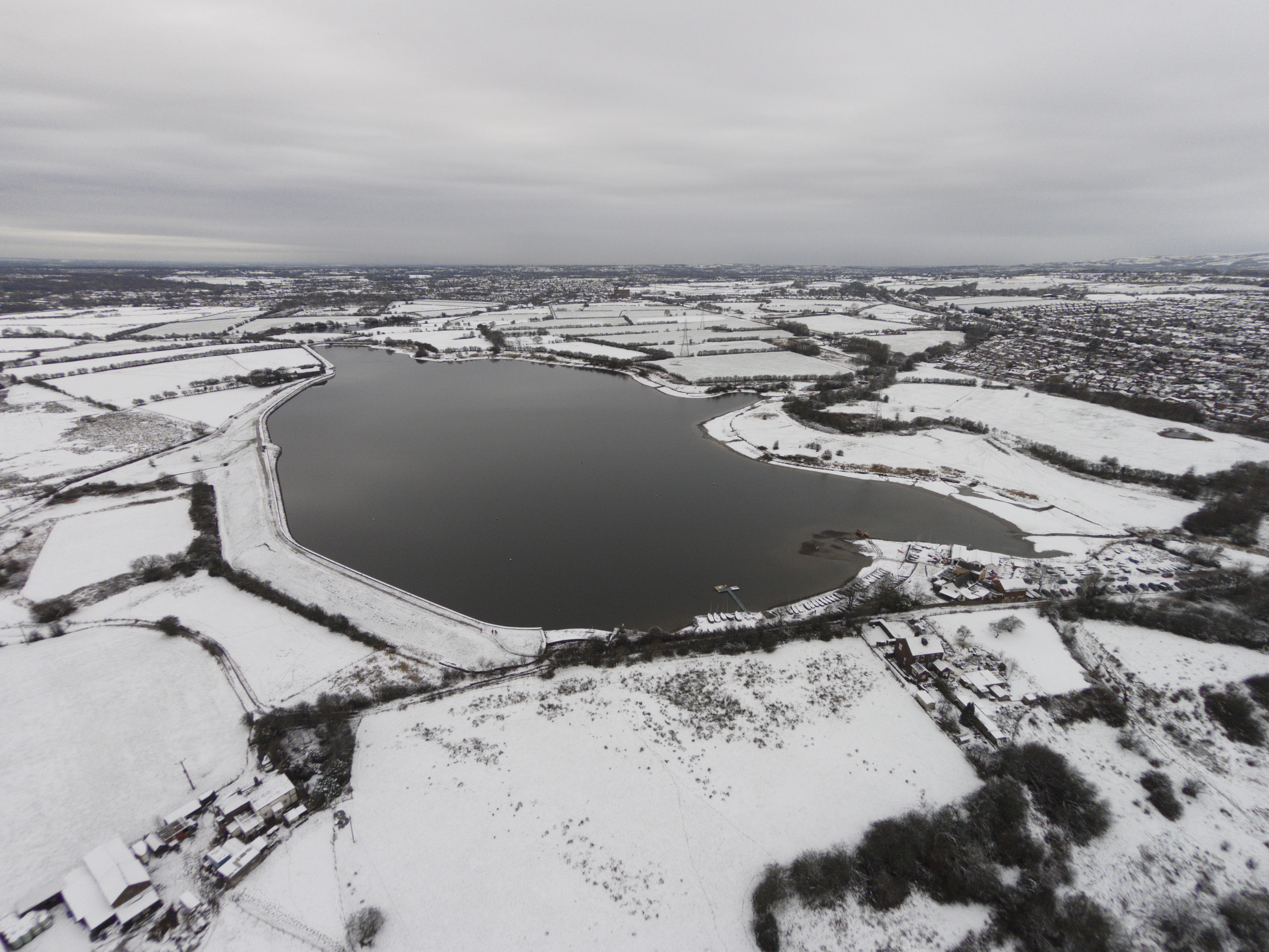
- Aerial view, January 2016

- Location within Greater Manchester
- Location: Greater Manchester
- Coordinates: 53.580022°N 2.319231°W
- Type: reservoir
- Primary inflows: River Irwell
- Primary outflows: MBB Canal
- Basin countries: United Kingdom
- Max. length: 9,400 m (30,800 ft)
- Max. width: 480 m (1,570 ft)
- Surface area: 22.6 ha (56 acres)

Manchester, Bolton and Bury Canal Reservoir, commonly called Elton Reservoir, is located near the A58 Bolton Road in Greater Manchester, about 3 km (1.8 mi) south west of the town of Bury, Greater Manchester. Constructed between 1802 and 1808 at the height of the canal era, and later enlarged, it continues to supply water to the canal, and remains a legacy of the industrial era and a major leisure facility for residents of Bury, Bolton and North Manchester.

== Description ==
The reservoir covers 226,000 sq m (56 acres) and contains some 1 million cubic metres (220 million imperial gallons). It is an important area for both resident and migrating water fowl, attracting many species throughout the year.

== History ==
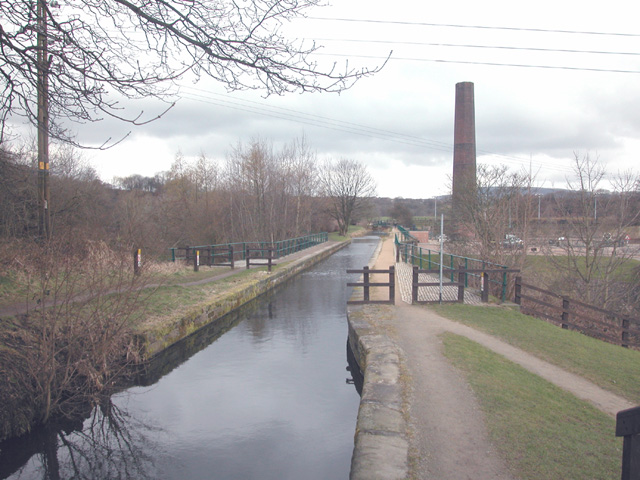
The aqueduct at Burrs Country Park, used to feed water to the reservoir.

It was originally conceived that Manchester, Bolton and Bury Canal would be supplied with water chiefly from the River Irwell at a point just above the Bury Bridge Weir. Mill owners would though have prior rights of supply, meaning water could be drawn into the canal only when the river ran above a certain level.

The Manchester, Bolton and Bury Canal Act 1791 (31 Geo. 3. c. 68) was passed in May 1791 and construction of the canal began almost straight away. At the same time, the company began exploring opportunities to extend their navigation in a manner reminiscent of proposals made as early as 1766, to connect the ports of Hull and Liverpool and their river navigations, by way of an inland canal from Sowerby Bridge to Manchester. Although nothing came of surveys taken then by James Brindley, between 1791 and 1794 particularly, the Proprietors of the Manchester, Bolton and Bury Canal announced intentions to extend similarly to or toward Sowerby Bridge, and toward Blackrod or Wigan in the west where they might junction with the emergent Leeds and Liverpool Canal. In 1794, the Manchester, Bolton and Bury Canal Company took the bold decision to re-engineer their narrow canal to a broad canal and committed an additional £11,000 for that purpose. This was in anticipation of making a junction in the west with the Leeds and Liverpool Canal, which was itself being made a broad canal. Perhaps more significantly, the company would have to increase their draw on river waters to fill their enlarged canal.

It is essential to understand that in the end, no such extensions were ever made, either to the east or west from their canal termini in Bury and Bolton respectively. Proprietors of the Manchester, Bolton and Bury Canal were though, still left to handle both the bill for having re-engineered their canal, and make arrangements to ensure it could be kept in water.

Although still far from complete, early commercial activity was reported upon the Manchester, Bolton and Bury Canal from around 1796, and it quickly became clear that water supply measures were inadequate. The company’s annual general assembly received a report the same year, prepared by William Crosley, on the state of the canal and measures to supply it with water, or otherwise. Among the options to increase water supply was a proposal to make a reservoir at Bank Top, upon the boundary of Radcliffe and Elton. It would be of approximately 33½ acres in size, holding 12,059,904 cubic feet of water.

Relations between the Canal Company and mill owners that year were especially strained. Lord Grey de Wilton and the Earl of Derby meanwhile maintained throughout that they would be guided always by their tenant mill owners’ satisfaction with essential additional water supply measures brought forward by the company. Their stance was of still greater significance to the canal company who simultaneously required support in Parliament for a new act by which they could raise additional funds necessary to complete the canal. On the day of the company’s annual general assembly of 1798, mill owners submitted a petition claiming a breach of water supply clauses set by the Manchester, Bolton and Bury Canal Act 1791 (31 Geo. 3. c. 68). These were refuted, but the assembly resolved to investigate fully nonetheless.

Company minute books, and the account of John Gorst, an external law clerk acting on behalf of the company, lay out the scale and nature of discussion through to 1802. A special meeting of the proprietors of the canal was held in 1800 at which plans were outlined for a possible ‘feeder’ to convey river water to their proposed reservoir. Other potential locations were explored for their reservoir, too. In 1802, The company placed an advert for canal diggers to tender for work to make the reservoir, and feeder, by separate lots. Contractors were appointed and arrangements were to be made for the proper acquisition of required land. It was reported that construction commenced in 1802, although it is worth noting that the account of John Gorst shows an agreement for land in Elton was not actually signed until the January of 1804.

Both the feeder canal and reservoir were reported to be ready in late 1808. The top surface area of the reservoir was reported then to be 33½ acres. This coincided with completion of works also to open the canal to the Mersey and Irwell Navigation and national waterway network by way of locks into the river Irwell below their wharf at Oldfield Lane.

Elton Reservoir was later enlarged, initially by footprint, and then by depth. There is some evidence to suggest that the first phase of enlargement had been completed early into the 1830s. However, a company account of 1906 reports all such works to have been completed 1839-40 by which time the top water surface area had been increased to about 55 acres. A newspaper report of the time indicates they would have been completed closer to 1842 although there would be a delay strengthening an embankment meaning the company was unable to take fullest advantage of their enlarged reservoir until 1844-5.

The total land purchased for the reservoir was then about 78 acres. Some of the surrounding land has since been sold. However, a number of boundary stones installed by the company can still be seen today. They are dated 1842, and bear the title name of the successor company to the one that made the first reservoir of 1808. That successor company, the Manchester, Bolton and Bury Canal Navigation and Railway Company, was established in 1831. Although it was this company that made and operated the Manchester and Bolton Railway (opened in 1838), they were not responsible for making any of the railways that came to Radcliffe and Bury. Therein lies a wholly different story.

Today water is still taken from the Irwell at Burrs Country Park and taken by the feeder canal to Elton Reservoir which in turn feeds the remains of the canal. All three elements are in the ownership of the Canal & River Trust.

It is a major leisure facility for residents of Bury, Bolton and North Manchester.

== Leisure use ==
The reservoir has been used for leisure since the Elton Club was founded in 1858. This club was initially for 'Gentlemen and their sons' to engage in the pursuit of fishing. The club later became the Elton Sailing Club and since 1870, the club has carried out sailing activities. The reservoir is also used for sailing activities by local community groups, Greater Manchester Police Sailing & Windsurfing Section and the scouts. The Triathlon clubs of Rochdale and Bolton also use the reservoir for Open Water swimming. The reservoir is now an important fishery in the north west of England managed by Bury Angling Association. The coarse fishery contains many species including, bream, pike, carp, tench and roach.

The National Cycle Route 6 passes alongside the reservoir. There is 6.5 km (4 ml) walking path around the reservoir which is described in the Bury Council book entitled "Walks Around Bury", Copies can be obtained at local libraries and Bury Tourist Information Centre or downloaded from the Bury MBC web site
