= Manchester, Bolton and Bury Canal Act 1791 =

Act of the Parliament of Great Britain

- Act of Parliament
- Parliament of Great Britain
- Long title: An Act for making and maintaining a navigable Canal from Manchester to or near Presto-lee-Bridge, in the township of Little Lever, and from thence by one branch to or near the town of Bolton, and by another branch to or near the town of Bury, and to Weddell Brook in the parish of Bury, all in the county palatine of Lancaster.
- Citation: 31 Geo. 3. c. 68
- Territorial extent: Great Britain

Dates
- Royal assent: 13 May 1791
- Commencement: 10 August 1790 (Note: Start of session.)
- Repealed: 23 August 1831
Other legislation
Repealed by	Manchester, Bolton and Bury Canal and Railway Act 1831

Status: Repealed

Text of statute as originally enacted

The Manchester, Bolton and Bury Canal Act 1791 (31 Geo. 3. c. 68) was an act of the Parliament of Great Britain that granted permission for the construction of the Manchester, Bolton and Bury Canal in Greater Manchester, England.

Entitled "An Act for making and maintaining a navigable Canal from Manchester to or near Presto-lee-Bridge, in the township of Little Lever, and from thence by one branch to or near the town of Bolton, and by another branch to or near the town of Bury, and to Weddell Brook in the parish of Bury, all in the county palatine of Lancaster.", it empowered the proprietors to raise shares of £100 each, totalling £47,000, to set tonnage rates, and allowed nearby mines and businesses to make connections to the canal.

== Bibliography ==
- Priestley, Joseph (1831), Historical Account of the Navigable Rivers, Canals, and Railways of Great Britain, Longman, Green
