= List of acts of the Parliament of Great Britain from 1791 =

This is a complete list of acts of the Parliament of Great Britain for the year 1791.

For acts passed until 1707, see the list of acts of the Parliament of England and the list of acts of the Parliament of Scotland. See also the list of acts of the Parliament of Ireland.

For acts passed from 1801 onwards, see the list of acts of the Parliament of the United Kingdom. For acts of the devolved parliaments and assemblies in the United Kingdom, see the list of acts of the Scottish Parliament, the list of acts of the Northern Ireland Assembly, and the list of acts and measures of Senedd Cymru; see also the list of acts of the Parliament of Northern Ireland.

The number shown after each act's title is its chapter number. Acts are cited using this number, preceded by the year(s) of the reign during which the relevant parliamentary session was held; thus the Union with Ireland Act 1800 is cited as "39 & 40 Geo. 3. c. 67", meaning the 67th act passed during the session that started in the 39th year of the reign of George III and which finished in the 40th year of that reign. Note that the modern convention is to use Arabic numerals in citations (thus "41 Geo. 3" rather than "41 Geo. III"). Acts of the last session of the Parliament of Great Britain and the first session of the Parliament of the United Kingdom are both cited as "41 Geo. 3".

Acts passed by the Parliament of Great Britain did not have a short title; however, some of these acts have subsequently been given a short title by acts of the Parliament of the United Kingdom (such as the Short Titles Act 1896).

Before the Acts of Parliament (Commencement) Act 1793 came into force on 8 April 1793, acts passed by the Parliament of Great Britain were deemed to have come into effect on the first day of the session in which they were passed. Because of this, the years given in the list below may in fact be the year before a particular act was passed.

== 31 Geo. 3 ==
The first session of the 17th Parliament of Great Britain, which sat between 10 August 1790 and 16 August 1791.

This session was also traditionally cited as 31 G. 3.

=== Public acts ===
Short title	Citation	Royal assent
Long title
Duties on Worts, Spirits, etc. Act 1791 (repealed)	31 Geo. 3. c. 1	29 December 1790
An Act for granting to his Majesty additional Duties upon Worts, Wash, and other Liquors brewed or made in England for extracting Spirits for Home Consumption, upon Spirits made in Scotland and imported into England, and upon Foreign Spirits imported into Great Britain; and to continue certain Acts for discontinuing, for a limited Time, the several Duties payable in Scotland upon Low Wines and Spirits, and upon Worts, Wash, and other Liquors there used in the Distillation of Spirits, and for granting to His Majesty other Duties in Lieu thereof; and for better regulating the Exportation of British-made Spirits from England to Scotland and from Scotland to England, and to continue, for a limited Time, an Act, made in the Twenty-sixth Year of the Reign of His present Majesty, (Note: Excise (No. 3) Act 1786 (26 Geo. 3. c. 73)) to discontinue for a limited Time the Payment of the Duties upon Low Wines and Spirits for Home Consumption, and for granting and securing the due Payment of other Duties in Lieu thereof; and for the better Regulation of the making and vending British Spirits. (Repealed by Statute Law Revision Act 1861 (24 & 25 Vict. c. 101))
Malt Duties Act 1791 (repealed)	31 Geo. 3. c. 2	29 December 1790
An Act for granting to His Majesty additional Duties on the Amount of the Duties under the Management of the Commissioners for the Affairs of Taxes therein mentioned. (Repealed by Statute Law Revision Act 1871 (34 & 35 Vict. c. 116))
Time for Entering into Recognisances Act 1791 (repealed)	31 Geo. 3. c. 3	29 December 1790
An Act to give further Time to John Macbride Esquire, and his Sureties, for entering into their Recognizances in respect of his Petition presented to the House of Commons, complaining of an undue Election and Return for the Borough of Plymouth, in the County of Devon. (Repealed by Statute Law Revision Act 1871 (34 & 35 Vict. c. 116))
Importation and Exportation Act 1791 (repealed)	31 Geo. 3. c. 4	29 December 1790
An Act to continue and amend so much of two Acts made in the last Session of Parliament, (Note: Importation and Exportation Act 1790 (30 Geo. 3. c. 1)) (Note: Importation and Exportation (No. 3) Act 1790 (30 Geo. 3. c. 42)) as relates to the Importation and Exportation of Corn and Grain, and to the authorising His Majesty to permit the Exportation of Corn, Grain, Meal, or Flour, and to prohibit the Importation thereof on the low Duties. (Repealed by Statute Law Revision Act 1871 (34 & 35 Vict. c. 116))
Assessed Taxes Act 1791 (repealed)	31 Geo. 3. c. 5	29 December 1790
An Act for granting to His Majesty additional Duties on the Amount of the Duties under the Management of the Commissioners for the Affairs of Taxes therein mentioned. (Repealed by Statute Law Revision Act 1861 (24 & 25 Vict. c. 101))
Land Tax Act 1791 (repealed)	31 Geo. 3. c. 6	29 December 1790
An Act for granting an Aid to His Majesty, by a Land Tax to be raised in Great Britain for the Service of the Year One thousand seven hundred and ninety-one. (Repealed by Statute Law Revision Act 1871 (34 & 35 Vict. c. 116))
Malt Duties (No. 2) Act 1791 (repealed)	31 Geo. 3. c. 7	29 December 1790
An Act for continuing and granting to His Majesty certain Duties upon Malt, Mum, Cyder, and Perry, for the Service of the Year One thousand seven hundred and ninety-one. (Repealed by Statute Law Revision Act 1871 (34 & 35 Vict. c. 116))
Indemnity Act 1791 (repealed)	31 Geo. 3. c. 8	23 March 1791
An Act to indemnify such Persons as have omitted to qualify themselves for Offices and Employments, and to indemnify Justices of the Peace, or others, who have omitted to register or deliver in their Qualifications within the Time limited by Law, and for giving further Time for those Purposes; and to indemnify Members and Officers in Cities, Corporations, and Borough Towns, whose Admissions have been omitted to be stamped according to Law, or having been stamped, have been lost, or mislaid, and for allowing them Time to provide Admissions duly stamped; to give further Time to such Persons as have omitted to make and file Affidavits of the Execution of Indentures, of Clerks to Attornies and Solicitors; and for indemnifying Deputy Lieutenants and Officers of the Militia who have neglected to transmit Descriptions of their Qualifications to the Clerks of the Peace within the Time limited by Law, and for giving further Time for that Purpose. (Repealed by Promissory Oaths Act 1871 (34 & 35 Vict. c. 48))
Marine Mutiny Act 1791 (repealed)	31 Geo. 3. c. 9	23 March 1791
An Act for the Regulation of His Majesty's Marine Forces while on Shore. (Repealed by Statute Law Revision Act 1871 (34 & 35 Vict. c. 116))
Expenses of His Majesty's Forces, India Act 1791 (repealed)	31 Geo. 3. c. 10	23 March 1791
An Act for altering and amending so much of an Act passed in the Twenty-eighth Year of His Majesty's Reign, intituled, "An Act for removing any Doubt respecting the Power of the Commissioners for the Affairs of India, to direct that the Expence of raising, transporting, and maintaining such Troops as may be judged necessary for the Security of the British Territories and Possessions in the East Indies, should be defrayed out of the Revenues arising from the said Territories and Possessions, and for limiting the Application of the said Revenues in the Manner therein mentioned;" (Note: East India Company Act 1788 (28 Geo. 3. c. 8)) as relates to such Directions as shall be given or approved by the said Commissioners, with respect to the Payment of certain Proportions of His Majesty's Forces in India, and of the European Forces of the East India Company therein specified. (Repealed by Statute Law Revision Act 1871 (34 & 35 Vict. c. 116))
East India Company (Money) Act 1791 or the East India Company (Stock) Act 1791 (repealed)	31 Geo. 3. c. 11	23 March 1791
An Act for removing any Doubt respecting the Sale or Mortgage of Annuities, pursuant to an Act made in the Twenty-sixth Year of the Reign of His present Majesty, intituled, "An Act to enable the East India Company to raise Money by a Sale of Annuities, and by increasing their Capital Stock." (Note: East India Company (Money) Act 1786 (26 Geo. 3. c. 62)) (Repealed by East India Loans Act 1937 (1 Edw. 8 & 1 Geo. 6 c. 14))
Trade with America Act 1791 (repealed)	31 Geo. 3. c. 12	23 March 1791
An Act to continue the Laws now in Force, for regulating the Trade between the Subjects of His Majesty's Dominions and the Inhabitants of the Territories belonging to the United States of America, so far as the same relate to the Trade and Commerce carried on between this Kingdom and the Inhabitants of the Countries belonging to the said United States. (Repealed by Statute Law Revision Act 1871 (34 & 35 Vict. c. 116))
Mutiny Act 1791 (repealed)	31 Geo. 3. c. 13	23 March 1791
An Act for punishing Mutiny and Desertion, and for the better Payment of the Army and their Quarters. (Repealed by Statute Law Revision Act 1871 (34 & 35 Vict. c. 116))
Land Tax (Commissioners) Act 1791 (repealed)	31 Geo. 3. c. 14	23 March 1791
An Act for appointing Commissioners for putting in Execution an Act of this Session of Parliament, intituled, "An Act for granting an Aid to His Majesty by a Land Tax, to be raised in Great Britain, for the Service of the Year One thousand seven hundred and ninety-one." (Note: Land Tax Act 1791 (31 Geo. 3. c. 6)) (Repealed by Statute Law Revision Act 1871 (34 & 35 Vict. c. 116))
Customs Act 1791 (repealed)	31 Geo. 3. c. 15	11 April 1791
An Act for granting to His Majesty an additional Duty on Sugar imported into this Kingdom. (Repealed by Statute Law Revision Act 1861 (24 & 25 Vict. c. 101))
Militia Pay Act 1791 (repealed)	31 Geo. 3. c. 16	11 April 1791
An Act for defraying the Charge of Pay and cloathing of the Militia, in that Part of Great Britain called England, for one Year, beginning the Twenty-fifth Day of March, One thousand seven hundred and ninety-one. (Repealed by Statute Law Revision Act 1871 (34 & 35 Vict. c. 116))
Deritend and Bordesley Improvement Act 1791 (repealed)	31 Geo. 3. c. 17	11 April 1791
An Act for cleansing, lighting, watching, and levelling the Surfaces of the Streets, and other public Places, within the Hamlets of Deretend and Bordesley in the County of Warwick, and for removing, and preventing Nuisances, Obstructions, and Encroachments, and regulating the driving of Carts and other Carriages, used for carrying Goods, Wares, and Merchandize therein. (Repealed by Birmingham Improvement Act 1851 (14 & 15 Vict. c. xciii))
Saint Pancras Improvement Act 1791 (repealed)	31 Geo. 3. c. 18	11 April 1791
An Act to explain and amend an Act made in the Twelfth Year of the Reign of His present Majesty, intituled, "An Act for paving, lighting, cleansing, watering, and watching the Streets and other Public Places within such Part of the Parish of Saint Pancras, in the County of Middlesex, as lies on the West Side of Tottenham Court Road, and for preventing Nuisances and Obstructions therein, and for obliging the Trustees, for the Care of the said Road, to pave, repair, and cleanse such Part of the said Road as is therein described." (Note: Saint Pancras Improvement Act 1772 (12 Geo. 3. c. 69)) (Repealed by St. Pancras Improvement Act 1812 (52 Geo. 3. c. lxxiv) (Note: Incorrectly cited as "1812 c clxxiv" in the Chronological Table of the Statutes.) and London Government (Borough of St. Pancras) Order in Council 1901 (SR&O 1901/274))
Bermondsey Poor Relief Act 1791 (repealed)	31 Geo. 3. c. 19	11 April 1791
An Act for amending and enlarging the Powers of, and rendering more effectual an Act made in the Thirty-first Year of the Reign of His late Majesty King George the Second, intituled, "An Act for ascertaining and collecting the Poors Rates, and for better regulating the Poor, in the Parish of Saint Mary Magdalen, Bermondsey, in the County of Surrey;" (Note: Bermondsey (Poor Relief) Act 1757 (31 Geo. 2. c. 45)) and for other the Purposes therein mentioned. (Repealed by London Government (Borough of Bermondsey) Order in Council 1901 (SR&O 1901/264))
Cottingham Inclosure Act 1791	31 Geo. 3. c. 20	11 April 1791
An Act for dividing and enclosing certain Open Fields, Lands, and Grounds in the Parish of Cottingham, in the East Riding of the County of York, and for amending an Act passed in the Sixth Year of the Reign of His present Majesty, (Note: Cottingham Inclosure Act 1766 (6 Geo. 3. c. 78 Pr.)) for dividing, enclosing, and draining certain Lands, Grounds, and Common Pastures, in the said Parish.
Certificates for Killing Hares Act 1791 (repealed)	31 Geo. 3. c. 21	6 June 1791
An Act for granting to His Majesty an additional Duty on Certificates, issued with respect to the killing of Game. (Repealed by Statute Law Revision Act 1861 (24 & 25 Vict. c. 101))
Surrey Gaol Act 1791 (repealed)	31 Geo. 3. c. 22	13 May 1791
An Act for building a new Common Gaol and Session House, with Accommodations thereto, for the County of Surrey, and for disposing of the present County Gaol and the Ground thereto belonging. (Repealed by Statute Law (Repeals) Act 2008 (c. 12))
Maryport Harbour Act 1791 (repealed)	31 Geo. 3. c. 23	11 April 1791
An Act for enlarging the Term and Powers of two Acts, made one in the Twenty-second, (Note: Maryport Harbour Act 1748 (22 Geo. 2. c. 6)) and the other in the Twenty-ninth (Note: Maryport Harbour Act 1756 (29 Geo. 2. c. 57)) Year of the Reign of King George the Second, for repairing, enlarging, and preserving the Harbour of Mary Port, in the County of Cumberland. (Repealed by Maryport Harbour and Improvement Act 1833 (3 & 4 Will. 4. c. cxiii))
Oswestry Poor Relief Act 1791 (repealed)	31 Geo. 3. c. 24	11 April 1791
An Act for the better Relief and Employment of the Poor belonging to the Town of Oswestry, and to certain Parishes within the Hundred of Oswestry, in the County of Salop, and to such Part of the Parish of Llanymynech as lies within the said Hundred, and to the Parish of Chirk, in the County of Denbigh, and to the Parish of Llansilin, in the Counties of Salop and Denbigh. (Repealed by Statute Law (Repeals) Act 2013 (c. 2))
Stamps Act 1791 (repealed)	31 Geo. 3. c. 25	6 June 1791
An Act for repealing the Duties now charged on Bills of Exchange, Promissory Notes, and other Notes, Drafts, and Orders, and on Receipts; and for granting other Duties in lieu thereof. (Repealed by Inland Revenue Repeal Act 1870 (33 & 34 Vict. c. 99))
Customs Act 1791 (repealed)	31 Geo. 3. c. 26	6 June 1791
An Act to allow the Importation of Seal Skins cured with Foreign Salt free of Duty for a limited Time. (Repealed by Statute Law Revision Act 1861 (24 & 25 Vict. c. 101))
Repeal of Certain Excise Duties Act 1791 (repealed)	31 Geo. 3. c. 27	6 June 1791
An Act for repealing certain Duties of Excise upon tanned Goat Skins and Sheep Skins, and for granting other Duties in lieu thereof; and also certain Duties of Customs on tanned Goat Skins imported. (Repealed by Statute Law Revision Act 1861 (24 & 25 Vict. c. 101))
Officers of Late Wine Licences Office Act 1791 (repealed)	31 Geo. 3. c. 28	6 June 1791
An Act to enable His Majesty to make Compensation to the Officers of the late Wine Licence Office for the Loss of their Offices. (Repealed by Statute Law Revision Act 1871 (34 & 35 Vict. c. 116))
Newfoundland Courts Act 1791	31 Geo. 3. c. 29	6 June 1791
An Act for establishing a Court of Civil Jurisdiction in the Island of Newfoundland, for a limited Time.
Importation and Exportation (No. 2) Act 1791 (repealed)	31 Geo. 3. c. 30	10 June 1791
An Act for regulating the Importation and Exportation of Corn, and the Payment of the Duty on Foreign Corn imported, and of the Bounty on British Corn exported. (Repealed by the Importation and Exportation Act 1821 (1 & 2 Geo. 4. c. 87))
Clergy Endowments (Canada) Act 1791 or the Constitutional Act 1791 (repealed)	31 Geo. 3. c. 31	10 June 1791
An Act to repeal certain Parts of an Act, passed in the fourteenth Year of his Majesty's Reign, intituled, "An Act for making more effectual Provision for the Government of the Province of Quebec, in North America;" (Note: British North America (Quebec) Act 1774 (14 Geo. 3. c. 83)) and to make further Provision for the Government of the said Province. (Repealed by Statute Law Revision Act 1966 (c. 5))
Roman Catholic Relief Act 1791 (repealed)	31 Geo. 3. c. 32	10 June 1791
An Act to relieve, upon Conditions and under Restrictions, the Persons therein described, from certain Penalties and Disabilities to which Papists, or Persons professing the Popish Religion, are by Law subject. (Repealed by Statute Law (Repeals) Act 1978 (c. 45))
Bank of England Act 1791 (repealed)	31 Geo. 3. c. 33	10 June 1791
An Act for the Payment of the Sum of Five hundred thousand Pounds, by the Governor and Company of the Bank of England, into the Receipt of His Majesty's Exchequer. (Repealed by Statute Law Revision Act 1870 (33 & 34 Vict. c. 69))
Annuity to Duke of Clarence Act 1791 (repealed)	31 Geo. 3. c. 34	6 June 1791
An Act for enabling His Majesty to settle an Annuity of Twelve thousand Pounds on His Royal Highness the Duke of Clarence during Pleasure. (Repealed by Statute Law Revision Act 1871 (34 & 35 Vict. c. 116))
Evidence Act 1791 (repealed)	31 Geo. 3. c. 35	6 June 1791
An Act to render Persons convicted of Petty Larceny competent Witnesses. (Repealed for England and Wales by Criminal Statutes Repeal Act 1827 (7 & 8 Geo. 4. c. 27) and for India by Criminal Law (India) Act 1828 (9 Geo. 4. c. 74))
Newcastle (Sale of Coal by Measured Keel) Act 1791 (repealed)	31 Geo. 3. c. 36	6 June 1791
An Act to prevent Keels, Pan Keels, and Pan Boats, and other Boats, and Wains and Carts, being used in the Removal or Carriage of Coals, after having undergone any Alterations or Repairs without being first inspected, re-admeasured, marked and nailed. (Repealed by Statute Law Revision Act 1948 (11 & 12 Geo. 6. c. 62))
Importation Act 1791 (repealed)	31 Geo. 3. c. 37	6 June 1791
An Act to prohibit the Importation into Great Britain of Silk Crapes and Tiffanies of the Manufacture of Italy, unless brought directly from thence. (Repealed by Statute Law Revision Act 1861 (24 & 25 Vict. c. 101))
Importation (No. 2) Act 1791 (repealed)	31 Geo. 3. c. 38	6 June 1791
An Act to amend an Act made in the Twenty-eighth Year of His present Majesty's Reign (Note: Trade Act 1788 (28 Geo. 3. c. 6)) for regulating the Trade between the Subjects of His Majesty's Colonies and Plantations in North America and in the West India Islands, and the Countries belonging to the United States of America, and between His Majesty's said Subjects and the Foreign Islands in the West Indies; and also an Act made in the Twenty-seventh Year of His present Majesty's Reign, (Note: Importation and Exportation Act 1787 (27 Geo. 3. c. 27)) for allowing the Importation and Exportation of certain Goods, Wares, and Merchandize in the Ports of Kingston, (Note: Kingston, Jamaica.) Savannah-la-Mar, (Note: Savanna-la-Mar, Jamaica.) Montego Bay, (Note: Montego Bay, Jamaica.) and Santa Lucea (Note: Lucea, Jamaica.) in the Island of Jamaica, in the Port of Saint George (Note: St. George's, Grenada.) in the Island of Grenada, in the Port of Roseau (Note: Roseau, Dominica.) in the Island of Dominica, and in the Port of Nassau (Note: Nassau, The Bahamas.) in the Island of New Providence, one of the Bahama Islands, under certain Regulations and Restrictions. (Repealed by Trade Act 1822 (3 Geo. 4. c. 44))
Merchant Shipping Act 1791 (repealed)	31 Geo. 3. c. 39	6 June 1791
An Act for the better Regulation and Government of Seamen employed in the Coasting Trade of this Kingdom. (Repealed by Merchant Seamen Act 1835 (5 & 6 Will. 4. c. 19))
East Indies Act 1791 (repealed)	31 Geo. 3. c. 40	6 June 1791
An Act for establishing and confirming a certain Resolution or Order of the Governor-General in Council of Fort William in Bengal, and all Acts done by virtue thereof, and for granting further Powers to the said Governor-General during his Residence on the Coasts of Coromandel and Malabar. (Repealed by Statute Law Revision Act 1871 (34 & 35 Vict. c. 116))
Appropriation Act 1791 (repealed)	31 Geo. 3. c. 41	6 June 1791
An Act for granting to His Majesty certain Sums of Money out of the Consolidated Fund for applying certain Monies therein mentioned for the Service of the Year One thousand seven hundred and ninety-one, and for further appropriating the Supplies granted in this Session of Parliament. (Repealed by Statute Law Revision Act 1871 (34 & 35 Vict. c. 116))
Duties on Importation, etc. Act 1791 (repealed)	31 Geo. 3. c. 42	6 June 1791
An Act for indemnifying all Persons who have been concerned in advising or carrying into Execution a certain Order of Council respecting the Importation of a limited Quantity of Salt-petre, for repealing the Duties now payable upon the Importation of Saltpetre, and for granting other Duties in lieu thereof. (Repealed by Statute Law Revision Act 1861 (24 & 25 Vict. c. 101))
Continuance of Laws, etc. Act 1791 (repealed)	31 Geo. 3. c. 43	6 June 1791
An Act to continue several Laws relating to the granting a Bounty on certain Species of British and Irish Linens exported, and taking off the Duties on the Importation of Foreign Raw Linen Yarns made of Flax; to the importing Salt from Europe into the Province of Quebec in America; to the allowing a Bounty on the Exportation of British-made Cordage; to continue and amend several Laws relating to the Encouragement of the Fisheries carried on in the Greenland Seas and Davis's Streights; and to the prohibiting the Exportation of Tools and Utensils made use of in the Iron and Steel Manufactures of this Kingdom; and to prevent the seducing of Artificers and Workmen employed in those Manufactures to go into Parts beyond the Seas; and to make perpetual an Act made in the Fifteenth Year of the Reign of His present Majesty, (Note: Customs (No. 2) Act 1775 (15 Geo. 3. c. 35)) to permit the free Importation of Raw Goat Skins into this Kingdom. (Repealed by Statute Law Revision Act 1861 (24 & 25 Vict. c. 101))
Ascertaining of Strength of Spirits Act 1791 (repealed)	31 Geo. 3. c. 44	6 June 1791
An Act to continue the several Laws therein mentioned, so far as relates to the ascertaining the Strength of Spirits by Clarke's Hydrometer. (Repealed by Statute Law Revision Act 1871 (34 & 35 Vict. c. 116))
Pilchard Fisheries Act 1791 (repealed)	31 Geo. 3. c. 45	6 June 1791
An Act for the Encouragement of the Pilchard Fishery, by allowing a further Bounty upon Pilchards taken, cured, and exported. (Repealed by Sea Fisheries Act 1868 (31 & 32 Vict. c. 45))
Gaols Act 1791 (repealed)	31 Geo. 3. c. 46	10 June 1791
An Act for the better regulating of Gaols and other Places of Confinement. (Repealed by Statute Law Revision Act 1861 (24 & 25 Vict. c. 101))
Importation and Exportation (No. 3) Act 1791 (repealed)	31 Geo. 3. c. 47	6 June 1791
An Act to prevent other Ships than those laden with Tobacco from Mooring and discharging their Lading at the Places appointed by an Act made in the Twenty-ninth Year of the Reign of His present Majesty, intituled, "An Act for repealing the Duties on Tobacco and Snuff, and for granting new Duties in lieu thereof;" (Note: Duties on Tobacco and Snuff Act 1789 (29 Geo. 3. c. 68)) to prohibit the Exportation of damaged or mean Tobacco; and for permitting the Importation of Tobacco and Snuff into the Port of Newcastle-upon-Tyne. (Repealed by Statute Law Revision Act 1861 (24 & 25 Vict. c. 101))
Loans or Exchequer Bills Act 1791 (repealed)	31 Geo. 3. c. 48	6 June 1791
An Act for raising a certain Sum of Money, by Loans or Exchequer Bills, for the Service of the Year One thousand seven hundred and ninety-one. (Repealed by Statute Law Revision Act 1871 (34 & 35 Vict. c. 116))
Loans or Exchequer Bills (No. 2) Act 1791 (repealed)	31 Geo. 3. c. 49	6 June 1791
An Act for raising a certain Sum of Money, by Loans or Exchequer Bills, for defraying the Public Expences occasioned by the Augmentation of His Majesty's Forces in the Year One thousand seven hundred and ninety. (Repealed by Statute Law Revision Act 1871 (34 & 35 Vict. c. 116))
Loans or Exchequer Bills (No. 3) Act 1791 (repealed)	31 Geo. 3. c. 50	6 June 1791
An Act for raising a further Sum of Money, by Loans or Exchequer Bills, for the Service of the Year One thousand seven hundred and ninety-one. (Repealed by Statute Law Revision Act 1871 (34 & 35 Vict. c. 116))
Oyster Fisheries Act 1791 (repealed)	31 Geo. 3. c. 51	10 June 1791
An Act for better protecting the several Oyster Fisheries within this Kingdom. (Repealed by Statute Law Revision Act 1861 (24 & 25 Vict. c. 101))
Pawnbrokers Act 1791 (repealed)	31 Geo. 3. c. 52	6 June 1791
An Act to continue for a limited Time, an Act passed in the Twenty-ninth Year of the Reign of His present Majesty, intituled, "An Act for further regulating the Trade or Business of Pawnbrokers." (Note: Pawnbrokers Act 1789 (29 Geo. 3. c. 57)) (Repealed by Statute Law Revision Act 1871 (34 & 35 Vict. c. 116))
Lottery Act 1791 (repealed)	31 Geo. 3. c. 53	6 June 1791
An Act for granting to His Majesty a certain Sum of Money to be raised by a Lottery. (Repealed by Statute Law Revision Act 1871 (34 & 35 Vict. c. 116))
Slave Trade Act 1791 (repealed)	31 Geo. 3. c. 54	10 June 1791
An Act to continue for a limited Time, and to amend an Act made in the last Session of Parliament, intituled, "An Act to amend and continue for a limited Time, several Acts of Parliament, for regulating the shipping and carrying Slaves in British Vessels, from the Coast of Africa." (Note: Slave Trade Act 1790 (30 Geo. 3. c. 33)) (Repealed by Statute Law Revision Act 1871 (34 & 35 Vict. c. 116))
Sierra Leone Company Act 1791 (repealed)	31 Geo. 3. c. 55	6 June 1791
An Act for establishing a Company for carrying on Trade between the Kingdom of Great Britain and the Coasts, Harbours, and Countries of Africa, and for enabling the said Company to hold by Grant from His Majesty, His Heirs, and Successors, and from the Native Princes of Africa, a certain District of Land commonly called The Peninsula of Sierra Leone, now vested in His Majesty, or belonging to the said Princes, for the better enabling the said Company to carry on the said Trade. (Repealed by Statute Law Revision Act 1861 (24 & 25 Vict. c. 101) (Note: Incorrectly cited as "SLR 1801" in the Chronological Table of the Statutes.))
Woollen, etc., Manufactures, Norfolk Act 1791 (repealed)	31 Geo. 3. c. 56	6 June 1791
An Act more effectually to prevent Abuses and Frauds committed by Persons employed in the Manufactures of combing Wool and Worsted Yarn, in the County of Norfolk, and City of Norwich, and County of the said City. (Repealed by Master and Servant Act 1889 (52 & 53 Vict. c. 24))
Edinburgh Bridewell Act 1791 (repealed)	31 Geo. 3. c. 57	6 June 1791
An Act for building and maintaining a Bridewell and Correction House in and for the City and County of Edinburgh. (Repealed by Statute Law Revision Act 1948 (11 & 12 Geo. 6. c. 62))
Cutlers' Company's Act 1791 or the Hallamshire Cutlers Act 1791	31 Geo. 3. c. 58	10 June 1791
An Act for the better Regulation and Government of the Company of Cutlers, within the Liberty of Hallamshire, in the County of York, and within Six Miles of the said Liberty, and of their Journeymen and Apprentices.
Worcester and Birmingham Canal Act 1791	31 Geo. 3. c. 59	10 June 1791
An Act for making and maintaining a Navigable Canal from or from near to the Town of Birmingham, in the County of Warwick, to communicate with the River Severn, near to the City of Worcester.
Selby Bridge Act 1791	31 Geo. 3. c. 60	11 April 1791
An Act for building a Bridge near the Ferry over the River Ouze, from Selby, in the West Riding of the County of York, to the opposite Shore in the Parish of Hemingborough, in the East Riding of the said County.
Christchurch, Surrey Improvement Act 1791	31 Geo. 3. c. 61	6 June 1791
An Act for paving, cleansing, lighting, watching, widening, regulating, and improving a certain Street called the Upper Ground Street, in the Parish of Christ Church, in the County of Surrey, and certain other Streets, Lanes, Passages, and Places within the said Parish, and for removing and preventing Encroachments, Nuisances, and Annoyances therein, and for shutting up Part of an Alley or Passage leading from Bull Alley to Marygold Court.
Maidstone Improvement Act 1791 (repealed)	31 Geo. 3. c. 62	6 June 1791
An Act for widening, improving, regulating, paving, cleansing, and lighting the Streets, Lanes, and other Public Passages and Places, within the King's Town of Maidstone, in the County of Kent, for removing and preventing Encroachments, Obstructions, Nuisances, and Annoyances therein, for better supplying the said Town with Water, and for repairing the Highways within the Parish of Maidstone. (Repealed by Maidstone Improvement Act 1819 (59 Geo. 3. c. xvi) and Local Government Supplemental Act 1866 (No. 4) (29 & 30 Vict. c. 107))
Chichester Paving and Improvement Act 1791 (repealed)	31 Geo. 3. c. 63	6 June 1791
An Act for repealing an Act made in the Eighteenth Year of the Reign of Queen Elizabeth, intituled, "An Act for paving of the City of Chichester," (Note: Paving of Streets (Chichester) Act 1575 (18 Eliz. 1. c. 19)) and for the better paving, repairing, and cleansing the Streets, Lanes, and Public Ways and Passages, within the Walls of the said City; and for removing and preventing Encroachments, Obstructions, and Annoyances therein. (Repealed by Local Government Board's Provisional Orders Confirmation (No. 16) Act 1893 (56 & 57 Vict. c. cxxxii))
Deal Improvement Act 1791 (repealed)	31 Geo. 3. c. 64	13 May 1791
An Act for repairing, paving, and cleansing the Highways, Streets and Lanes, within the Town and Borough of Deal, in the County of Kent, and for removing and preventing Encroachments, Obstructions, Nuisances, and Annoyances therein. (Repealed by Deal Improvement Act 1812 (52 Geo. 3. c. lxxiii))
Leicester Navigation Act 1791 (repealed)	31 Geo. 3. c. 65	13 May 1791
An Act for making and maintaining a Navigable Communication between the Loughborough Canal and the Town of Leicester, and for making and maintaining a Communication by Railways or Stone Roads, and Water Levels, from several Places and Mines to the said Loughborough Canal, and for continuing the same, by passing along the said Canal to the said Navigable Communication, all in the County of Leicester. (Repealed by Leicester Navigation Act 1848 (11 & 12 Vict. c. v))
River Rother Navigation Act 1791	31 Geo. 3. c. 66	11 April 1791
An Act to enable the Earl of Egremont to make, and maintain the River Rother Navigable from the Town of Midhurst, to a certain Meadow called the Railed Pieces or Stopham Meadow, in the Parish of Stopham, and a Navigable Cut from the said River to the River Arun, at or near Stopham Bridge, in the County of Sussex, and for other Purposes.
Thames and Severn Canal Act 1791	31 Geo. 3. c. 67	13 May 1791
An Act to enable the Company of Proprietors of the Thames and Severn Canal Navigation to borrow a further Sum of Money, to complete the said Navigation.
Manchester, Bolton and Bury Canal Act 1791 (repealed)	31 Geo. 3. c. 68	13 May 1791
An Act for making and maintaining a Navigable Canal from Manchester to or near Presto-lee Bridge, in the Township of Little Lever, and from thence by one Branch to or near the Town of Bolton, and by another Branch to or near the Town of Bury, and to Weddell Brook, in the Parish of Bury, all in the County Palatine of Lancaster. (Repealed by Manchester, Bolton and Bury Canal and Railway Act 1831 (1 & 2 Will. 4. c. lx))
Leominster Canal Act 1791	31 Geo. 3. c. 69	13 May 1791
An Act for making and maintaining a Navigable Canal from Kington, in the County of Hereford, by or through Leominster, to join the River Severn near Stourport Bridge, in the County of Worcester.
Stourbridge Improvement Act 1791 (repealed)	31 Geo. 3. c. 70	13 May 1791
An Act for lighting, cleansing, and watching the Streets, Lanes, and other public Passages and Places, within the Township of Stourbridge, in the Parish of Old Swinford, in the County of Worcester, and for removing and preventing Obstructions, Nuisances, and Annoyances therein. (Repealed by Stourbridge Improvement Act 1825 (6 Geo. 4. c. xix))
All Saints Church, Southampton Act 1791	31 Geo. 3. c. 71	13 May 1791
An Act for taking down and re-building the Parish Church of All Saints, within the Town and County of the Town of Southampton, and for purchasing Land for the Purpose of a Church Yard for the Use of the said Parish.
Loes and Wilford, Suffolk Poor Relief Act 1791 (repealed)	31 Geo. 3. c. 72	13 May 1791
An Act for the better Relief and Employment of the Poor within the Hundreds of Loes and Wilford, in the County of Suffolk. (Repealed by Loes and Wilford Poor Relief Act 1826 (7 Geo. 4. c. i))
Saffron Walden Parish Church Act 1791	31 Geo. 3. c. 73	6 June 1791
An Act for repairing the Parish Church of Saffron Walden, in the County of Essex.
Wakefield Church Act 1791	31 Geo. 3. c. 74	6 June 1791
An Act for building a new Church in the Town of Wakefield, in the West Riding of the County of York, and for providing a proper Burial Ground, and making Provision for a Minister to officiate in the said Church.
Saint Chad, Shrewsbury Church Act 1791	31 Geo. 3. c. 75	6 June 1791
An Act for enlarging the Powers of an Act passed in the Twenty-ninth Year of the Reign of His present Majesty, intituled, "An Act for rebuilding the Parish Church of Saint Chad, in the Town of Shrewsbury and County of Salop, and for providing a new Cemetery or Burial Ground, and making convenient Avenues and Passages to the said Church and Cemetery; and for raising a further Sum of Money for fully effecting the general Purposes in the said Act mentioned." (Note: Saint Chad, Shrewsbury Parish Church Act 1789 (29 Geo. 3. c. 31))
Lower Ouse Navigation Act 1791 or the Lower Ouse Improvement Act 1791 (repealed)	31 Geo. 3. c. 76	6 June 1791
An Act for improving the Navigation of the River Ouse, between Newhaven Bridge and Lewes Bridge, in the County of Sussex, and for the better draining of the Low Lands lying in Lewes and Laughton Levels, in the said County. (Repealed by Newhaven Harbour and Ouse Lower Navigation Act 1847 (10 & 11 Vict. c. ix))
Melton Mowbray Navigation Act 1791 or the Wreak and Eye Navigation Act 1791	31 Geo. 3. c. 77	6 June 1791
An Act for making navigable the Rivers Wreak and Eye, from the Junction of the said River Wreak, with the intended Navigation from Loughborough to Leicester, at or near a certain Place called Turnwater Meadow, in the Lordship of Cossington, to Mill Close Homestead, in the Parish of Melton Mowbray, all in the County of Leicester.
Ellesmere Poor Relief Act 1791 (repealed)	31 Geo. 3. c. 78	6 June 1791
An Act for the better Relief and Employment of the Poor belonging to the several Parishes of Ellesmere, Middle, Baschurch, and Hordley, and to the Chapelry or District of Hadnal (otherwise Hadnal Ease), in the County of Salop. (Repealed by Statute Law (Repeals) Act 2013 (c. 2))
Dudley Improvement Act 1791 (repealed)	31 Geo. 3. c. 79	6 June 1791
An Act for better paving, cleansing, lighting, watching, and otherwise improving the Town of Dudley, in the County of Worcester, and for better supplying the said Town with Water. (Repealed by Dudley Corporation Act 1969 (c. liii))
Lincoln Improvement Act 1791 (repealed)	31 Geo. 3. c. 80	6 June 1791
An Act for paving the Footways of certain Streets within the City of Lincoln, for cleansing, lighting, and watching the said Streets, and other Streets, Lanes, and Public Passages and Places within the said City, and for removing and preventing Nuisances, Annoyances, and Encroachments therein. (Repealed by Lincoln Improvement Act 1828 (9 Geo. 4. c. xxvii))
Isle of Ely Drainage Act 1791	31 Geo. 3. c. 81	6 June 1791
An Act for embanking and draining certain Fen Lands and Low Grounds within the Parishes of Chatteris and Dodington and Hamlet of Wimblington, in the said Parish of Dodington, in the Isle of Ely, and County of Cambridge, and for dividing, allotting, and enclosing the Commons and Waste Lands within the said Hamlet of Wimblington.
Kirkcaldy Beer Duties Act 1791 (repealed)	31 Geo. 3. c. 82	6 June 1791
An Act to continue two Acts made in the Fifteenth (Note: Kirkcaldy Beer Duties Act 1741 (15 Geo. 2. c. 8)) and Thirty-first (Note: Kirkcaldy Beer Duties Act 1757 (31 Geo. 2. c. 69)) Years of the Reign of His late Majesty King George the Second, for laying a Duty of Two Pennies Scots, or One-sixth Part of a Penny Sterling, upon every Scots Pint of Ale and Beer which shall be brewed for Sale, brought into, tapped, or sold, within the Town of Kirkcaldy and Liberties thereof. (Repealed by Statute Law Revision Act 1948 (11 & 12 Geo. 6. c. 62))
Swansea Harbour Act 1791 (repealed)	31 Geo. 3. c. 83	6 June 1791
An Act for repairing, enlarging, and preserving the Harbour of Swansea, in the County of Glamorgan. (Repealed by Swansea Harbour Amendment Act 1804 (44 Geo. 3. c. lvi) and Swansea Harbour Act 1854 (17 & 18 Vict. c. cxxvi))
Staines Bridge Act 1791 (repealed)	31 Geo. 3. c. 84	6 June 1791
An Act for building a Bridge cross the River Thames from Stanes to Egham, in the Counties of Middlesex and Surrey. (Repealed by Staines Bridge Act 1828 (9 Geo. 4. c. c))
Neath Canal Act 1791	31 Geo. 3. c. 85	6 June 1791
An Act for making and maintaining a Canal or Navigable Communication from or near a certain Place called Abernant, in the County of Glamorgan, to and through a certain Place called the Brickfield, near Melincrythan Pill, into the River of Neath, near the Town of Neath, in the said County.
Lewes Improvement Act 1791	31 Geo. 3. c. 86	6 June 1791
An Act for enlarging and extending the Powers of the present Prescriptive Market within the Town and Borough of Lewes, in the County of Sussex, and removing the same to a more convenient Place within the said Town and Borough, or within the Precinct of the Castle of Lewes aforesaid.
Sunderland Poor Relief Act 1791 (repealed)	31 Geo. 3. c. 87	6 June 1791
An Act for the better Maintenance and Support of the Poor of the Parish of Sunderland, near the Sea, in the County Palatine of Durham. (Repealed by Statute Law (Repeals) Act 2008 (c. 12))
River Dee Navigation Act 1791	31 Geo. 3. c. 88	10 June 1791
An Act for confirming an Agreement entered into between the Company of Proprietors of the Undertaking for recovering and preserving the Navigation of the River Dee, and certain Lords of Manors, and other Persons entitled to Right of Common upon the Wastes and Commons, and the Old Common Salt Marshes, lying on the South Side of the said River, below, or to the North-east of Greenfield Gate, in the County of Flint, and an Award made in Consequence thereof.
Herefordshire and Gloucestershire Canal Act 1791	31 Geo. 3. c. 89	11 April 1791
An Act for making and maintaining a Navigable Cut or Canal from the City of Hereford to the City of Gloucester, with a Collateral Cut from the same to the Town of Newent in the County of Gloucester.
Finsbury Square Act 1791 (repealed)	31 Geo. 3. c. 90	10 June 1791
An Act for paving, lighting, watching, cleansing, watering, repairing, and keeping in Repair Finsbury Square, in the Parish of Saint Luke, in the County of Middlesex, and Part of the Manor of Finsbury, and certain other Streets and Places communicating with, or near to the said Square, and for preventing or removing Nuisances and Annoyances within the same. (Repealed by Finsbury Square (Paving, Watching, etc.) Act 1795 (35 Geo. 3. c. 45) and London Government (Borough of Finsbury) Order in Council 1901 (SR&O 1901/266))
Sedgmoor Drainage Act 1791	31 Geo. 3. c. 91	13 May 1791
An Act for draining and dividing a certain Moor, or Tract of Waste Land, called King's Sedgmoor, in the County of Somerset.
Holy Island Inclosure Act 1791	31 Geo. 3. c. 92	6 June 1791
An Act for dividing, allotting, and enclosing a certain large Open Tract of Land, within the Manor of Holy Island, in the County Palatine of Durham, and for extinguishing the Right of Common upon the ancient Infield Lands within the said Island,
Anwick Inclosure Act 1791	31 Geo. 3. c. 93	6 June 1791
An Act for dividing and enclosing the Open Common Fields, Meadow Ground, Half-Year's Land, Common Fens, and Waste Lands, within the Parish of Anwick, in the County of Lincoln, and for embanking and draining the said Common Fens, and certain enclosed Low Lands adjoining thereto, called the Praie Grounds, in or near the Township of North Kyme, in the said County.
Kent Roads Act 1791 (repealed)	31 Geo. 3. c. 94	29 December 1790
An Act for making a new Road from Saint George's Gate, in the City of Canterbury, to a Place called Gutteridge Bottom; and for repairing and widening the present Road from thence to the Dover Turnpike Road in the Parish of Barham, in the County of Kent. (Repealed by Road from Canterbury to Barham Act 1803 (43 Geo. 3. c. xvii))
Ayr Roads Act 1791 (repealed)	31 Geo. 3. c. 95	23 March 1791
An Act for amending an Act made in the Twenty-ninth Year of the Reign of His present Majesty, (Note: Ayr Roads Act 1789 (29 Geo. 3. c. 79)) for making and repairing the Road from the City of Glasgow, in the County of Lanark, to Muirkirk, in the County of Ayr, and from thence to the Consines of the said County of Ayr towards Sanquhar, in the County of Dumfries, and other Roads communicating therewith; and for the more effectually repairing the said Roads, and the Road from the Village of Gorbals and new Bridge of Glasgow to the Chapel of Cambuslang, in the said County of Lanark, and Branches thereof; and for making and repairing the Road from the said Chapel of Cambuslang till it joins the High Road leading from Hamilton by Burnbank towards Eaglesham in the County of Renfrew. (Repealed by Roads in Lanark, Ayr and Renfrew and Dalmarnock Bridge Act 1842 (5 & 6 Vict. c. cxii))
Bedford and Huntingdonshire Roads Act 1791 (repealed)	31 Geo. 3. c. 96	23 March 1791
An Act for enlarging the Term and Powers of Two Acts of the Tenth Year of His present Majesty, (Note: Bedford and Hunts Roads Act 1770 (10 Geo. 3. c. 83)) and the last Session of Parliament, (Note: Huntingdonshire Roads Act 1790 (30 Geo. 3. c. 103)) for repairing the Road from Biggleswade, in the County of Bedford, through Bugden and Alconbury to the Top of Alconbury Hill, and from Bugden to Huntingdon, and from Cross Hall to Great Stoughton Common, in the County of Huntingdon; and also the Road leading out of the aforesaid Road at or near the Ferry House in the Parish of Tempsford, to and through Little Barford, Eynesbury, and Saint Neot's to the Turnpike Road at the End of Cross Hall Lane, and from the Turnpike Road in the Parish of Eaton Soken, to the said Turnpike Road near Saint Neot's Bridge. (Repealed by Biggleswade and Alconbury Hill Road Act 1816 (56 Geo. 3. c. lii))
Cardigan Roads Act 1791 (repealed)	31 Geo. 3. c. 97	23 March 1791
An Act for continuing the Term and altering and enlarging the Powers of an Act made in the Tenth Year of His Majesty's Reign (Note: Cardigan Roads Act 1770 (10 Geo. 3. c. 55)) for repairing several Roads in the County of Cardigan, and for repairing other Roads in the said County. (Repealed by Roads in Cardiganshire Act 1833 (3 & 4 Will. 4. c. xxxvii))
Wellesbourne Mountfort and Stratford-upon-Avon Road Act 1791 (repealed)	31 Geo. 3. c. 98	23 March 1791
An Act to enlarge the Term of an Act passed in the Tenth Year of the Reign of His present Majesty, (Note: Wellesbourne Mountfort and Stratford-upon-Avon Road Act 1770 (10 Geo. 3. c. 94)) for amending the Road from Wellsbourn Mountfort to Stratford-upon-Avon, in the County of Warwick. (Repealed by Wellesbourne Mountford and Stratford-upon-Avon Road Act 1833 (3 & 4 Will. 4. c. xvi))
Essex and Hertfordshire Roads Act 1791 (repealed)	31 Geo. 3. c. 99	23 March 1791
An Act for enlarging the Term and Powers of Two Acts of the Seventeenth Year of His late Majesty, (Note: Essex and Hertfordshire Roads Act 1743 (17 Geo. 2. c. 9)) and the Ninth Year of His present Majesty, (Note: Essex and Herts Roads Act 1769 (9 Geo. 3. c. 51)) for repairing and widening the Road leading from a Place called Harlow Bush Common, in the Parish of Harlow, in the County of Essex, to Stump Cross in the Parish of Great Chesterford, in the said County. (Repealed by Road from Harlow Bush Common to Stump Cross Act 1829 (10 Geo. 4. c. xxi))
Norfolk Roads Act 1791 (repealed)	31 Geo. 3. c. 100	11 April 1791
An Act for enlarging the Term and Powers of an Act of the Tenth Year of His present Majesty, (Note: Stoke Ferry Roads Act 1770 (10 Geo. 3. c. 78)) for amending and widening several Roads leading from the Bell (Note: The Bell Inn, now the Blue Bell, Lynn Road, Stoke Ferry, Norfolk. 52°34′24″N 0°30′37″E) in Stoke Ferry, in the County of Norfolk; and for amending, widening, and keeping in Repair, the Road from Methwold Warren House to a Place called the Devil's Ditch in the said County. (Repealed by Stoke Ferry Roads (Norfolk) Act 1832 (2 & 3 Will. 4. c. lxxxiii))
Bicester to Aylesbury Road Act 1791 (repealed)	31 Geo. 3. c. 101	11 April 1791
An Act to enlarge the Term and Powers of an Act passed in the Tenth Year of the Reign of His present Majesty, (Note: Bicester and Aylesbury Road Act 1770 (10 Geo. 3. c. 72)) for repairing and widening the Road from Bicester in the County of Oxford, to Aylesbury in the County of Bucks. (Repealed by Bicester and Aylesbury Road Act 1813 (53 Geo. 3. c. cxcix) and Bicester and Aylesbury Road Act 1833 (3 & 4 Will. 4. c. xxiv))
Pembroke Roads Act 1791 (repealed)	31 Geo. 3. c. 102	11 April 1791
An Act for amending, widening, and keeping in Repair, the Road leading from Robeston Wathan to Saint Clears, and other Roads therein mentioned, in the Counties of Pembroke and Carmarthen. (Repealed by Robeston Wathan and St. Clears Road and Branches (Pembroke and Carmarthen) Act 1832 (2 & 3 Will. 4. c. liv))
Bicester to Aynho Road Act 1791 (repealed)	31 Geo. 3. c. 103	11 April 1791
An Act for repairing and widening the Road from the Market Place in Bicester in the County of Oxford, to the Buckingham Turnpike Road in Aynho in the County of Northampton. (Repealed by Bicester and Aynho Road and Branch Act 1813 (53 Geo. 3. c. cc), Annual Turnpike Acts Continuance Act 1876 (39 & 40 Vict. c. 39) and Statute Law (Repeals) Act 2013 (c. 2))
Sussex Roads Act 1791 (repealed)	31 Geo. 3. c. 104	13 May 1791
An Act to repeal so much of an act of the eleventh year of his present Majesty, (Note: Sussex Roads Act 1771 (11 Geo. 3. c. 94)) for repairing and widening the road from the turnpike road at Vinehall, in the parish of Mountfield, in the county of Sussex, to Cripps's Corner, and from thence to Staple Cross, and to the turnpike road near the windmill, in the parish of Beckley, and from Staple Cross to Longley's water corn mill, at Kent Ditch, and from Cripp's Corner to the town of Rye, in the said county, as relates to the said roads from Staple Cross to the turnpike road near the said windmill, and from Staple Cross to Longley's water corn mill aforesaid; and for enlarging the term and powers of the said act, so far as relates to the rest of the said roads. (Repealed by Road from Vinehall to Taylor's Corner (Sussex) Act 1832 (2 & 3 Will. 4. c. lvii))
Fyfield and St. John's Bridge, and Kingston Bagpuize and Newbridge Roads Act 1791 (repealed)	31 Geo. 3. c. 105	13 May 1791
An Act for enlarging the Term and Powers of Three several Acts passed in the Sixth (Note: Fyfield and St. John's Bridge Road Act 1732 (6 Geo. 2. c. 16)) and Twelfth (Note: Berkshire Roads Act 1738 (12 Geo. 2. c. 11)) Years of the Reign of His late Majesty King George the Second, and in the Third Year of the Reign of His present Majesty, (Note: Fyfield, St. John's and Newbridge Road Act 1763 (3 Geo. 3. c. 29)) for repairing the Road from Fyfield, in the County of Berks, to Saint John's Bridge, in the County of Gloucester, and from an Inn called The Hind's Head, in the Parish of Kingston Bagpuze, in the said County of Berks, to that Part of Newbridge which stands in the said County of Berks. (Repealed by Fyfield and St. John's Bridge, and Kingston Bagpuize and Newbridge Roads Act 1833 (3 & 4 Will. 4. c. xci))
Fishguard Roads Act 1791 (repealed)	31 Geo. 3. c. 106	11 April 1791
An Act for amending, widening, and keeping in Repair, the Road leading from the Town of Haverfordwest, through the Town of Fishguard to the Town of Newport, in the County of Pembroke, and also from the Town of Fishguard to the City of Saint David's in the said County of Pembroke. (Repealed by Road from Haverfordwest through Fishguard Act 1812 (52 Geo. 3. c. xli), South Wales Turnpike Trusts Act 1844 (7 & 8 Vict. c. 91) and South Wales Turnpike Roads Act 1847 (10 & 11 Vict. c. 72))
Ayr Roads Act 1791 (repealed)	31 Geo. 3. c. 107	10 June 1791
An Act to enlarge the Term and Powers of several Acts, made for repairing the Roads from Livingstone, by the Kirk of Shotts, to the City of Glasgow, and by the Town of Hamilton, to the Town of Strathaven, and for repairing and widening the Roads from the Confines of the County of Ayr, at or near Lochgate, to the Town of Strathaven, and for repairing the several Roads leading into the City of Glasgow; so far as the same relate to the Road leading from the Town of Airdrie towards the City of Glasgow, through the Village of Shettleston, till it falls into the Great Road from Murriehall to the said City, and for repairing the Road from the said Great Road, by Drygate and Whitehill, to Carntyne, and for repairing and widening several other Roads; and for building a Bridge over the River Clyde, at or near Theevesfoord; and for opening and making certain Streets in and near the City of Glasgow. (Repealed by Livingston and Glasgow Road Act 1814 (54 Geo. 3. c. ccii))
Hertford and Middlesex Roads Act 1791 (repealed)	31 Geo. 3. c. 108	6 June 1791
An Act for more effectually amending, widening, and repairing the Road through the several Parishes of Saint Michael, Saint Alban, Saint Peter, Shenley, Ridge, and South Mims, in the Counties of Hertford and Middlesex. (Repealed by St. Michael and South Mimms Road Act 1811 (51 Geo. 3. c. clviii))
Pembroke Roads (No. 2) Act 1791 (repealed)	31 Geo. 3. c. 109	13 May 1791
An Act for opening a new Road from Milford, in the County of Pembroke, to Stainton, and for amending and widening the Road from the said new Road through Stainton and Johnson to Merlin's Bridge, in the same County. (Repealed by Road from Milford to Stainton (Pembrokeshire) Act 1808 (48 Geo. 3. c. cxlvii))
Southwark Roads Act 1791 (repealed)	31 Geo. 3. c. 110	11 April 1791
An Act for enlarging the Term, and for explaining, amending, and making more effectual, the Powers of Two several Acts passed in the Twenty-second Year of the Reign of His late Majesty King George the Second, (Note: Southwark Roads Act 1748 (22 Geo. 2. c. 31)) and the Seventh Year of His present Majesty, (Note: Southwark Roads Act 1766 (7 Geo. 3. c. 64)) for making a new Road from New Street in the Parish of Saint John Southwark, to and through the several Places therein mentioned; and for keeping the same and several other Roads adjoining in Repair. (Repealed by Roads in Bermondsey, Rotherhithe and Deptford Act 1823 (4 Geo. 4. c. lxxxiv))
Chapel on the Heath and Bourton on the Hill Road Act 1791 (repealed)	31 Geo. 3. c. 111	11 April 1791
An Act for enlarging the Term and Powers of an Act of the Fifth Year of His present Majesty, (Note: Chapel on the Heath and Bourton on the Hill Road Act 1765 (5 Geo. 3. c. 80)) for repairing the Road leading from Chapel-on-the-Heath, in the County of Oxford, to Bourton-on-the-Hill, in the County of Gloucester. (Repealed by Statute Law (Repeals) Act 2013 (c. 2))
Norfolk Roads (No. 2) Act 1791 (repealed)	31 Geo. 3. c. 112	11 April 1791
An Act for continuing and amending an Act of the Tenth Year of His present Majesty, (Note: Norfolk Roads (No. 2) Act 1770 (10 Geo. 3. c. 85)) for repairing and widening the several Roads from the South Gate, in the Borough of King's Lynn, into the Parishes of East Walton, Narborough, Stoke Ferry, and Downham, in the County of Norfolk. (Repealed by King's Lynn Roads Act 1831 (1 & 2 Will. 4. c. xx))
Norfolk Roads (No. 3) Act 1791 (repealed)	31 Geo. 3. c. 113	11 April 1791
An Act for continuing an Act of the Tenth Year of His present Majesty, (Note: Norfolk Roads (No. 3) Act 1770 (10 Geo. 3. c. 86)) for repairing and widening the Roads from the East Gate, in the Borough of King's Lynn, into the Parishes of Geyton and Grimstone, and to the Gate next Hillington on Congham Common, and to the North End of Babingley Lane, in the County of Norfolk. (Repealed by King's Lynn and Castle Rising Roads Act 1831 (1 & 2 Will. 4. c. xxi))
Hereford Roads Act 1791 (repealed)	31 Geo. 3. c. 114	11 April 1791
An Act for enlarging the Term and varying the Powers of an Act of the Thirteenth Year of His present Majesty, (Note: Hereford Roads (No. 2) Act 1773 (13 Geo. 3. c. 96)) for repairing and widening certain Roads leading into the Town of Ross in the County of Hereford, and for amending, widening, and keeping in Repair certain Streets or Highways within the said Town, and also certain small Pieces of Road communicating with the Roads comprised in the said Act. (Repealed by Ross (Hereford) Roads Act 1815 (55 Geo. 3. c. lxi))
Lewes and Brighton Road Act 1791 (repealed)	31 Geo. 3. c. 115	13 May 1791
An Act to continue the Term and Powers of an Act passed in the Tenth Year of the Reign of His present Majesty King George the Third, (Note: Lewes and Brighton Road Act 1770 (10 Geo. 3. c. 64)) for repairing and widening the Road from Lewes to Brighthelmston, (Note: Brighthelmston is now known as Brighton.) in the County of Sussex. (Repealed by Lewes to Brighton Road Act 1833 (3 & 4 Will. 4. c. xliii))
Warwick and Gloucester Roads Act 1791 (repealed)	31 Geo. 3. c. 116	13 May 1791
An Act for amending, widening, and keeping in Repair the Road leading from the Alcester and Evesham Turnpike Road at the End of Wixford Lane, in the County of Warwick, to Chipping Campden, and from thence to Upton Old Lane, in the County of Gloucester. (Repealed by Statute Law (Repeals) Act 2013 (c. 2))
Devon Roads Act 1791 (repealed)	31 Geo. 3. c. 117	13 May 1791
An Act to continue and amend an Act of the Twelfth Year of the Reign of His present Majesty (Note: Devon Roads (No. 2) Act 1772 (12 Geo. 3. c. 93)) for repairing and widening the Road from the Exeter Turnpike at Reedy Gate, in the Parish of Dunsford, in the County of Devon, to Cherrybrook, in the Forest of Dartmoore, in the said County. (Repealed by Dunsford and Cherrybrook Road Act 1813 (53 Geo. 3. c. iii) and Dunsford and Cherry Brook Road (Devon) Act 1833 (3 & 4 Will. 4. c. vi))
Roads from Brighton to Lovell Heath Act 1791 (repealed)	31 Geo. 3. c. 118	13 May 1791
An Act for enlarging the Term and Powers of an Act passed in the Tenth Year of the Reign of His present Majesty, (Note: Roads from Brighton to Lovell Heath Act 1770 (10 Geo. 3. c. 95)) for repairing and widening the Roads leading from Brighthelmston to the County Oak on Lovell Heath, in the County of Sussex. (Repealed by Roads from Brighton and from Austy Cross Act 1825 (6 Geo. 4. c. xxxix))
Whitchurch to Aldermaston Road Act 1791 (repealed)	31 Geo. 3. c. 119	13 May 1791
An Act to enlarge the Term of an Act passed in the Tenth Year of the Reign of His present Majesty (Note: Whitchurch to Aldermaston Road Act 1770 (10 Geo. 3. c. 88)) for repairing and widening the Road from Whitchurch, (Note: Whitchurch, Hampshire.) in the County of Southampton, to the Turnpike Road at Aldermaston Great Bridge, (Note: Aldermaston Bridge, carrying the A340 Basingstoke Road over the River Kennet, between Aldermaston and Aldermaston Wharf, Berkshire. 51°23′29″N 1°08′58″W) in the County of Berks. (Repealed by Whitchurch (Hampshire) and Aldermaston Road Act 1833 (3 & 4 Will. 4. c. lxxvii))
Shepton Mallet Roads Act 1791 (repealed)	31 Geo. 3. c. 120	13 May 1791
An Act to enlarge the Term and Powers of Three several Acts passed in the Twenty-sixth Year of the Reign of His late Majesty King George the Second, (Note: Somerset Roads (No. 2) Act 1753 (26 Geo. 2. c. 71)) and in the Fifth (Note: Somerset Roads Act 1765 (5 Geo. 3. c. 104)) and Twentieth (Note: Somerset Roads Act 1780 (20 Geo. 3. c. 85)) Years of the Reign of His present Majesty, for repairing several Roads therein mentioned, leading to and from the Town of Shepton Mallet, in the County of Somerset, and for repairing the Road from a Place called Long Cross Bottom, to the Bruton Turnpike Road, near Batcombe Church, in the said County; and for paving, cleansing, lighting, and regulating the Streets, Lanes, and other publick Passages within the said Town. (Repealed by Annual Turnpike Acts Continuance Act 1874 (37 & 38 Vict. c. 95))
Swindon, Calne and Cricklade Roads Act 1791 (repealed)	31 Geo. 3. c. 121	6 June 1791
An Act for amending, widening, and keeping in Repair the Roads leading from Swindon to the Centre of Christian Malford Bridge, and from Calne to Lyneham Green, and from the Direction Post in Long Leaze Lane, near Lydiard Marsh, to Cricklade, in the County of Wilts. (Repealed by Swindon, Calne and Cricklade Roads Act 1833 (3 & 4 Will. 4. c. xcii))
Yorkshire and Westmorland Roads Act 1791 (repealed)	31 Geo. 3. c. 122	6 June 1791
An Act for enlarging the Term and Powers of two Acts of the Sixteenth Year of King George the Second, (Note: Westmorland Roads Act 1742 (16 Geo. 2. c. 3)) and the Ninth Year of His present Majesty, (Note: Yorkshire Roads (No. 2) Act 1769 (9 Geo. 3. c. 75)) for repairing the Road from Bowes, in the County of York, to Brough-under-Stainmore, in the County of Westmorland; and for repairing and widening the Road from Maiden Castle to Kaber Cross, and other Roads therein mentioned, in the said Counties. (Repealed by Roads from Bowes and from Maiden Castle Act 1813 (53 Geo. 3. c. clxxxvii) and Annual Turnpike Acts Continuance Act 1867 (30 & 31 Vict. c. 121))
Darley Moor and Ellaston Road Act 1791 (repealed)	31 Geo. 3. c. 123	6 June 1791
An Act to enlarge the Term and Powers of an Act passed in the Ninth Year of the Reign of His present Majesty, (Note: Darley Moor and Ellaston Road Act 1769 (9 Geo. 3. c. 81)) for repairing and widening the Road from Darley Moor, (Note: Darley Moor, on the A515 road, south of Ashbourne, Derbyshire. 52°58′10″N 1°45′11″W) in the County of Derby, to Ellaston, (Note: Ellastone, Staffordshire.) in the County of Stafford, and from thence to the Turnpike Road (Note: The A523 road between Leek, Staffordshire, and Ashbourne, Derbyshire. 53°03′55″N 1°55′15″W) between Leek and Ashborne, in the said Counties of Derby and Stafford. (Repealed by Darly Moor and Ellaston Road (Derbyshire) Act 1833 (3 & 4 Will. 4. c. vii))
Brentford Road Act 1791 (repealed)	31 Geo. 3. c. 124	6 June 1791
An Act to enlarge the Term and Powers of an Act made in the Seventh Year of the Reign of His present Majesty, (Note: Middlesex Roads Act 1766 (7 Geo. 3. c. 88)) for repairing the Highways from that Part of Counter's Bridge which lies in the Parish of Kensington, in the County of Middlesex, leading through the Towns of Brentford and Hounslow to the Powder Mills in the Road to Staines, and to Cranford Bridge, in the said County, in the Road to Colnbrook; and for repairing, turning, or altering the Highway leading from the said Road, at or near the End of Sion Lane, to the Town of Isleworth, in the said County, and from thence to a Gate on the South Side of Teddington Field; and also the Highway leading out of the said great Road near Smallbury Green Turnpike to a House known by the Sign of The George, in the Town of Isleworth aforesaid; and for lighting and watering Part of the said Highways. (Repealed by Highways from Kensington Act 1813 (53 Geo. 3. c. xc) and Metropolis Roads Act 1826 (7 Geo. 4. c. cxlii))
Macclesfield and Nether Tabley Road Act 1791 (repealed)	31 Geo. 3. c. 125	6 June 1791
An Act for enlarging the Term and Powers of an Act passed in the Ninth Year of the Reign of His present Majesty, (Note: Macclesfield and Nether Tabley Road Act 1769 (9 Geo. 3. c. 65)) for repairing and widening the Road from the Broken Cross in Macclesfield, in the County of Chester, over the Long Moss and Monk's Heath, to the Turnpike Road in Nether Tabley, in the said County; and for turning and exchanging Part of the said Road. (Repealed by Road from Macclesfield to Nether Tabley Act 1831 (1 Will. 4. c. xv))
Haverfordwest and St. David's Road Act 1791 (repealed)	31 Geo. 3. c. 126	11 April 1791
An Act for amending, widening, and keeping in Repair the Roads leading from the Town of Haverfordwest to the City of Saint David's, and from the said City to Caerfai, in the Parish of Saint David's in the County of Pembroke. (Repealed by South Wales Turnpike Trusts Act 1844 (7 & 8 Vict. c. 91))
Stafford Roads (No. 2) Act 1791 (repealed)	31 Geo. 3. c. 127	11 April 1791
An Act for continuing the Term, and altering and enlarging the Powers of an Act passed in the Tenth Year of the Reign of His present Majesty (Note: Stafford Roads Act 1770 (10 Geo. 3. c. 113)) for repairing, widening, turning, and altering the Roads from Butterton Moor End (Note: Butterton Moor End, Onecote, Staffordshire. 53°05′50″N 1°55′22″W) near Oncott, in the County of Stafford, to the Three Mile Stone in the Turnpike Road (Note: The A515 road between Buxton and Ashbourne, Derbyshire. 53°13′32″N 1°52′21″W) leading from Buxton to Ashborne in the County of Derby, and from Blackton Moor (Note: Blackton Moor, near Warslow, Staffordshire. 53°07′45″N 1°52′00″W) in the County of Stafford, to the Turnpike Road (Note: The A515 road between Buxton and Ashbourne, north of Newhaven, Derbyshire. 53°08′51″N 1°45′53″W) leading from Buxton to Ashborne near Newhaven in the County of Derby, and from Warslow (Note: Warslow, Staffordshire. 53°07′33″N 1°52′05″W) to Ecton Mine (Note: Ecton Mine, Ecton, Staffordshire. 53°07′21″N 1°51′30″W) in the County of Stafford. (Repealed by Butterton Moor End and Buxton and Ashbourne Turnpike Road Act 1833 (3 & 4 Will. 4. c. xcvii))
Oxford and Northampton Roads Act 1791 (repealed)	31 Geo. 3. c. 128	11 April 1791
An Act for enlarging the Term of an Act of the Tenth Year of His present Majesty (Note: Oxford, Gloucester and Notts Roads Act 1770 (10 Geo. 3. c. 101)) for repairing and widening the Road from Burford to Banbury, in the County of Oxford, and from Burford aforesaid to the Turnpike Road leading to Stow, in the County of Gloucester, at the Bottom of Stow Hill, and from Swerford Gate, in the said County of Oxford, to the Turnpike Road in Aynho, in the County of Northampton. (Repealed by Burford and Banbury, Burford and Stow, and Swerford Gate and Aynho Roads Act 1810 (50 Geo. 3. c. ccx))
Darlaston Turnpike Act Act 1791 (repealed)	31 Geo. 3. c. 129	6 June 1791
An Act to enlarge the Term and Powers of an Act passed in the Nineteenth Year of the Reign of His present Majesty, intituled, "An Act for reducing into One Act of Parliament the several Laws now in Force for repairing the Road leading from the Town or Village of Tittensor to the most Northern Part of Talk-on-the-Hill, in Butt Lane, in the County of Stafford, and for repairing the Road from Darlastone Bridge, over Tittensor Heath, through the Town or Village of Tittensor aforesaid; and for making and keeping in Repair a Road branching out of the said Turnpike Road near the House known by the Sign of The Black Lion, to or nearly to Shelton Wharf, all in the Parish of Stoke-upon-Trent, in the said County of Stafford." (Note: Darlaston Turnpike Act 1779 (19 Geo. 3. c. 119)) (Repealed by Darlaston Turnpike Act 1823 (4 Geo. 4. c. xxx))
Hereford Roads Act 1791 (repealed)	31 Geo. 3. c. 130	6 June 1791
An Act for more effectually repairing several Roads leading from the Town of Bromyard, in the County of Hereford, and other Roads adjoining thereto. (Repealed by Roads from Bromyard (Herefordshire and Worcestershire) Act 1821 (1 & 2 Geo. 4. c. xcii))
Dunham Ferry and Great Markham Common Road Act 1791 (repealed)	31 Geo. 3. c. 131	6 June 1791
An Act for enlarging the Term and Powers of an Act passed in the Fifth Year of the Reign of His present Majesty (Note: Dunham Ferry and Great Markham Common Road Act 1765 (5 Geo. 3. c. 54)) for repairing and widening the Road from Dunham Ferry to the South End of Great Markham Common, in the County of Nottingham. (Repealed by Dunham Ferry and Great Markham Common Road Act 1813 (53 Geo. 3. c. xii) and Annual Turnpike Acts Continuance Act 1869 (32 & 33 Vict. c. 90))
Nottingham Roads (No. 2) Act 1791 (repealed)	31 Geo. 3. c. 132	6 June 1791
An Act for enlarging the Term and Powers of an Act passed in the Tenth Year of the Reign of His present Majesty (Note: Nottingham Roads Act 1770 (10 Geo. 3. c. 92)) for repairing and widening the Road from Worksop to the Turnpike Road at Kelham, and from Debdale Hill to the Great Northern Road at South Muskham, in the County of Nottingham. (Repealed by Worksop and Kelham, and Debdale Hill and South Muskham Roads Act 1839 (2 & 3 Vict. c. xv))
Buckingham to Banbury Road Act 1791 (repealed)	31 Geo. 3. c. 133	6 June 1791
An Act for amending and widening several Pieces of Road, and opening and making several Pieces of new Road therein described, so as to make a convenient Carriage Road from Buckingham through Brackley, to join the Daventry Turnpike Road near Banbury. (Repealed by Brackley Turnpike Roads Consolidation Act 1851 (14 & 15 Vict. c. lxi))
Middlesex and Surrey Roads Act 1791 (repealed)	31 Geo. 3. c. 134	6 June 1791
An Act to enlarge the Term and Powers of Three Acts made in the First (Note: Egham and Bagshot Road Act 1727 (1 Geo. 2. St. 2. c. 6)) and Twelfth (Note: Egham and Bagshot Road Act 1738 (12 Geo. 2. c. 16)) Years of the Reign of His late Majesty King George the Second, and in the Third Year of His present Majesty, (Note: Egham and Bagshot Road Act 1763 (3 Geo. 3. c. 47)) for repairing the Road from the Powder Mills on Hounslow Heath, (Note: The Gunpowder Mills were located in Bedfont on the north of the A315 Staines Road, on Hounslow Heath, to the east of the River Crane. 51°27′32″N 0°24′06″W) in the County of Middlesex, to a Place called Basingstone, (Note: The Basing Stone was located near the former Jolly Farmer public house, at the junction of the A30 and A325 roads.) near the Town of Bagshot, in the Parish of Windlesham, in the County of Surrey; and for maintaining and repairing Egham Causeway, (Note: Egham Causeway runs from Staines Bridge. It was built in the 13th century to protect Egham from flooding. 51°26′03″N 0°31′35″W) in the said County of Surrey. (Repealed by Hounslow Heath and Egham Hill Road Act 1809 (49 Geo. 3. c. lviii) and Egham Hill and Bagshot Road Act 1816 (56 Geo. 3. c. xviii))
Great Marlow to Stokenchurch Road Act 1791	31 Geo. 3. c. 135	6 June 1791
An Act for amending, widening, and keeping in Repair the Road from Great Marlow, in the County of Buckingham, to Stokenchurch in the County of Oxford.
Buckinghamshire and Oxford Roads Act 1791 (repealed)	31 Geo. 3. c. 136	6 June 1791
An Act for enlarging the Terms of Two several Acts passed in the Tenth (Note: Buckingham and Oxford Roads Act 1770 (10 Geo. 3. c. 58)) and Twenty-fifth (Note: Buckingham and Oxford Roads Act 1785 (25 Geo. 3. c. 127)) Years of His present Majesty's Reign for amending the Road from Aylesbury in the County of Buckingham, through Thame and Little Milton, to the Turnpike Road between Bensington and Shillingford, in the County of Oxford; and for amending the Road from the Turnpike Road at Thame to the Oxford Turnpike Road between Postcomb and Tetsworth, in the said County; and for making more effectual Provision for repairing the said Roads. (Repealed by Aylesbury and Thame Road Act 1833 (3 & 4 Will. 4. c. lxxxvi))
Sussex Roads (No. 3) Act 1791 (repealed)	31 Geo. 3. c. 137	10 June 1791
An Act for continuing and amending certain Acts of the Second (Note: Sussex and Kent Roads Act 1762 (2 Geo. 3. c. 72)) and Twenty-second (Note: Sussex Roads Act 1782 (22 Geo. 3. c. 114)) Years of His present Majesty, for repairing and widening the Road from Flimwell Vent, in the County of Sussex, through Highgate in the County of Kent, and the Parishes of Sandhurst, Newenden, and Northiam to Rye, in the said County of Sussex, and from Highgate aforesaid to Cooper's Corner, in the said County of Sussex, and for repairing and widening a Piece of Road communicating with one of the Roads comprized in the said Acts, called Whitebread Lane. (Repealed by Sussex Roads Act 1825 (6 Geo. 4. c. xliii))

=== Private and personal acts ===
Short title	Citation	Royal assent
Long title
Beal and Kellingley Inclosure Act 1791	31 Geo. 3. c. 1 Pr.	29 December 1790
An Act for dividing and enclosing the Open Common Fields, Meadows, Ings, or Pastures, and other Commonable Lands and Waste Grounds within the Lordships or Liberties of Beal, otherwise Beaghall and Kellingley in the Parish of Kellington, in the West Riding of the County of York.
Doveridge Inclosure Act 1791	31 Geo. 3. c. 2 Pr.	29 December 1790
An Act for dividing and enclosing the Common Fields, Common Pastures, and Waste Lands, within the Parish of Doveridge alias Dovebridge, in the County of Derby.
Noordingh's Naturalization Act 1791	31 Geo. 3. c. 3	29 December 1790
An Act for naturalizing Christian Noordingh.
Byng's Estate Act 1791	31 Geo. 3. c. 4 Pr.	23 March 1791
An Act for vesting the Estates devised by the Will of the Honourable Elizabeth Byng, deceased, in the County of Somerset, in Trustees, to be sold and for investing the Money arising by the Sale thereof in the Purchase of other Estates, to be settled to the like Uses to which the Estates so to be sold are subject.
Brand's Estate Act 1791	31 Geo. 3. c. 5 Pr.	23 March 1791
An Act to enable Trustees to cut down and sell Timber upon the Estates devised by the Will of Thomas Brand Esquire, and to invest the Monies arising therefrom in the Purchase of Lands and Hereditaments, to be settled to the Uses of the Will; and for other Purposes therein mentioned.
Parlsow's Divorce Act 1791	31 Geo. 3. c. 6	23 March 1791
An Act to dissolve the Marriage of John Parslow Esquire with Elizabeth Hall his now Wife, and to enable him to marry again; and for other Purposes therein mentioned.
Kellington Inclosure Act 1791	31 Geo. 3. c. 7 Pr.	23 March 1791
An Act for dividing and enclosing the Open Common Fields, Meadows, Ings, Pastures, and other Commonable Lands and Waste Grounds, within the Lordship or Liberty of Kellington, in the West Riding of the County of York.
Tadcaster Inclosure Act 1791	31 Geo. 3. c. 8 Pr.	23 March 1791
An Act for dividing and enclosing the Open Common Fields, Common Ings, Stinted Pasture, Common and Waste Grounds, within the Manor of Tadcaster, in the County of York, and County of the City of York.
Foreman's Naturalization Act 1791	31 Geo. 3. c. 9	23 March 1791
An Act for naturalizing Luke Foreman Esquire.
Naturalization of Nicholas Martinius and James La Fontaine Act 1791	31 Geo. 3. c. 10	23 March 1791
An Act for naturalizing Nicholas Albert Martinius and James La Fontaine.
Naturalization of Peter and Joanna Godeffroy and John Thornton Act 1791	31 Geo. 3. c. 11	23 March 1791
An Act for naturalizing Peter Godeffroy, Johanna Catherine Godeffroy, his Wife, and John Thornton.
Krohn's Naturalization Act 1791	31 Geo. 3. c. 12	23 March 1791
An Act for naturalizing Jacob Krohn.
William Parkes's, Thomas and Mary Read's and Earl of Warwick's estates: exchange of lands in Warwickshire.	31 Geo. 3. c. 13 Pr.	11 April 1791
An Act for establishing and confirming an Agreement made between William Parkes and Thomas Read and Mary his Wife, and the Right Honourable George Earl Brooke, of Warwick Castle and Earl of Warwick, for the Exchange of certain Lands in the County of Warwick, and in the Borough of Warwick in the said County.
Dean and Chapter of Canterbury and Thomas Clutton: building leases agreement.	31 Geo. 3. c. 14 Pr.	11 April 1791
An Act for enabling the Dean and Chapter of Canterbury and Thomas Clutton to grant Building Leases, pursuant to an Agreement entered into for that Purpose.
Day's Estate Act 1791	31 Geo. 3. c. 15 Pr.	11 April 1791
An Act for vesting the Bath Estate situate in the Island of Barbadoes, and late belonging to Edward Day Esquire, deceased, together with the Stock and Effects upon or belonging to the same, in Trustees, to be sold and conveyed pursuant to an Agreement for that Purpose, and for applying the Money to arise by such Sale in discharging the Incumbrances thereon, and for other Purposes therein expressed.
Smith's Estate Act 1791	31 Geo. 3. c. 16 Pr.	11 April 1791
An Act for enabling the Trustees of Henry Smith Esquire, deceased, to accept a Conveyance of divers Hereditaments in the Parish of Reigate in the County of Surry, and an Annual or Fee-Farm Rent of Twenty-five Pounds, reserved out of or for the Manor of Mount Bures, in the County of Essex, and a yearly Rent of Thirty Pounds, Part of an Annual or Fee-Farm Rent of Forty Pounds, reserved out of or for the Manor of Heddington with the Hundred of Bullingdon in the County of Oxford in Exchange for the several Manors of Knowle, Seven Oaks, Kempsing and Seal, in the County of Kent, and divers Hereditaments in the several Parishes of Seven Oaks, Kempsing and Seal in the said County of Kent, and to convey the last mentioned Hereditaments accordingly.
Walford's Divorce Act 1791	31 Geo. 3. c. 17 Pr.	11 April 1791
An Act to dissolve the Marriage of John Walford the Younger with Sophia Elizabeth Jeanes, his now Wife, and to enable him to marry again, and for other Purposes therein mentioned.
Great Kineton Inclosure Act 1791	31 Geo. 3. c. 18 Pr.	11 April 1791
An Act for dividing and enclosing the Open and Common Field, and Commonable Land and Ground within the Manor and Parish of Great Kineton, otherwise Kington, in the County of Warwick, called Great Kineton Field.
Egginton Inclosure Act 1791	31 Geo. 3. c. 19 Pr.	11 April 1791
An Act for dividing and enclosing the Common and Open Fields, Common Meadows, Common Pastures, Stinted Pastures, Commons, and Waste Lands within the Manor and Parish of Egginton in the County of Derby.
Kippax Inclosure Act 1791	31 Geo. 3. c. 20 Pr.	11 April 1791
An Act for dividing and enclosing the Open Parts of the Common Arable Fields, a Common Stinted Pasture called the Town Close, and a certain Common or Waste called the Hollings, within the Manor and Township of Kippax in the West Riding of the County of York.
Little Woolstone Inclosure Act 1791	31 Geo. 3. c. 21 Pr.	11 April 1791
An Act for dividing, allotting, and enclosing the Open and Common Fields, Common Meadows, Common Pastures, Waste and other Commonable Lands and Grounds, in the Parish of Little Woolston, in the County of Bucks.
Barkeston and Plungar (Leicestershire) Inclosures Act 1791	31 Geo. 3. c. 22 Pr.	11 April 1791
An Act for dividing and enclosing the Open Common Fields, Pastures, Meadows, Woods, and other Commonable Lands and Waste Grounds, within the Parishes of Barston, otherwise Barkestone and Plungar, in the County of Leicester.
Hose Inclosure Act 1791	31 Geo. 3. c. 23 Pr.	11 April 1791
An Act for dividing and enclosing the Open Common Fields, Meadows and Pastures, and other Commonable Lands and Waste Grounds within the Parish of Hose, in the County of Leicester.
Naturalization of Charles Cazenove and John Batard Act 1791	31 Geo. 3. c. 24 Pr.	11 April 1791
An Act for naturalizing Charles Theophilus Cazenove, and John Francis Batard.
Koithan's Naturalization Act 1791	31 Geo. 3. c. 25 Pr.	11 April 1791
An Act for naturalizing Frederick Koithan.
Heyman's Naturalization Act 1791	31 Geo. 3. c. 26 Pr.	11 April 1791
An Act for naturalizing Henry Heyman the Younger.
Marquis de Choiseul's Naturalization Act 1791	31 Geo. 3. c. 27 Pr.	11 April 1791
An Act for naturalizing Jean Baptiste Armand de Choiseul, called Marquis de Choiseul.
Archbishop of York's and William Markham's Estates Act 1791	31 Geo. 3. c. 28 Pr.	13 May 1791
An Act for establishing and confirming a certain Exchange agreed upon between His Grace the Archbishop of York and William Markham Esquire, of certain Lands and Hereditaments of the said Archbishop called Beckey Grange, in the Parish of Abberford, in the County of York, for certain Lands and Hereditaments of the said William Markham, situate at Langthorne and Crakehall, in the Parishes of Bedale and Hornby, or one of them, in the said County.
Staunton's Estate Act 1791	31 Geo. 3. c. 29 Pr.	13 May 1791
An Act for vesting certain Estates, late of or belonging to Thomas Staunton Esquire, deceased, in the Counties of Essex, Suffolk, and Buckingham, in Trustees, to be sold; and for applying the Money to arise therefrom in such Manner as therein is mentioned.
Webb's Estate Act 1791	31 Geo. 3. c. 30 Pr.	13 May 1791
An Act to empower Nathaniel Webb Esquire and others to grant building and repairing Leases of certain Estates in the Parish of Saint Giles-in-the-Fields, in the County of Middlesex.
Chadwick Inclosure Act 1791	31 Geo. 3. c. 31 Pr.	13 May 1791
An Act for dividing and enclosing certain Commons and Waste Lands within the Manor of Chadwich, otherwise Chadwick, in the Parish of Bromsgrove, in the County of Worcester.
Birdham Common Inclosure Act 1791	31 Geo. 3. c. 32 Pr.	13 May 1791
An Act for dividing and enclosing that Part of the Manhood Common, in the Hundred of Manhood, in the County of Sussex, which lies in the Parish of Birdham, in the same County, commonly called or known by the Name of Birdham Common.
West Wittering Common and Cackham Green (Sussex) inclosures.	31 Geo. 3. c. 33 Pr.	13 May 1791
An Act for dividing and enclosing that Part of the Manhood Common, in the Hundred of Manhood, in the County of Sussex, which lies in the Parish of Westwittering, in the same County, commonly called or known by the Name of West-wittering Common; and also a certain open Waste or Common, called Cackham Green, in the same Parish.
Eastwood Inclosure Act 1791	31 Geo. 3. c. 34 Pr.	13 May 1791
An Act for dividing and enclosing the Commons and Waste Ground within the Parish of Eastwood, in the County of Nottingham.
Tarvin Inclosure Act 1791	31 Geo. 3. c. 35 Pr.	13 May 1791
An Act for dividing, allotting, and enclosing certain Commons and Waste Lands within the Parish of Tarvin, in the County of Chester.
Christleton Inclosure Act 1791	31 Geo. 3. c. 36 Pr.	13 May 1791
An Act for dividing, allotting, and enclosing certain Commons and Waste Lands within the Manor and Township of Christleton, in the County of Chester.
Norton-in-the-Clay Inclosure Act 1791	31 Geo. 3. c. 37 Pr.	13 May 1791
An Act for dividing and enclosing the Open Fields, Common Pastures, and Waste Grounds, within the Manor or Township of Norton-in-the-Clay, in the North Riding of the County of York.
Handsworth Inclosure Act 1791	31 Geo. 3. c. 38 Pr.	13 May 1791
An Act for dividing and enclosing the Open Field, Commons, and Waste Lands, within the Manor of Handsworth, in the County of Stafford.
Trafford's Name Act 1791	31 Geo. 3. c. 39 Pr.	13 May 1791
An Act to enable Dame Jane Trafford, Widow and Relict of Sir Clement Trafford Knight, deceased, to take and use the Surname of Southwell, pursuant to the Will of Edward Southwell Esquire, deceased.
Dormer's Estate Act 1791	31 Geo. 3. c. 40 Pr.	6 June 1791
An Act for enabling Trustees to grant Leases of Part of the Estates of Susannah Ann Treffry Dormer and Jane Treffry Dormer Infants, and to invest the Monies arising from the Leases to be granted on Fines, in the Purchase of real Estates, to be settled to the subsisting Uses of the Estates so to be leased.
Thomas Hustler's and Richard Peirse's Estates Act 1791	31 Geo. 3. c. 41 Pr.	6 June 1791
An Act for confirming and rendering effectual a Partition and Division between Thomas Hustler Esquire and Richard William Peirse Esquire, of the Manor and Mansion House of Acklam, in the North Riding of the County of York, and of divers Messuages, Lands, Tenements, Tythes, and Hereditaments, in the Parishes of Acklam and Middlesbrough, and in the Townships of Linthorpe and Airsome, in the said North Riding of the said County of York; and for settling and limiting the Intirety of the said Manor and Mansion House, and of the specifick Messuages, Farms, Lands, and Hereditaments which, upon such Partition and Division, were allotted to each of them, to the several Uses therein mentioned, and for other Purposes.
Dicconson's Estate Act 1791	31 Geo. 3. c. 42 Pr.	6 June 1791
An Act for vesting the settled Estates of William Dicconson Esquire and Meliora his Wife, and Edward Dicconson Esquire, in the County of Lincoln, and at Wigan, Penwortham, Coppul, Charnuck, Richard, Croston, Worthington, Burscough, and Dalton in Furness, in the County of Lancaster, in Trustees upon Trust, to raise Money by Sale or Mortgage thereof, and to apply the Money so to be raised in the Purchase of an Estate at Parbold, in the said County of Lancaster, to be settled to the Uses of the settled Estates.
Clowes' Estate Act 1791	31 Geo. 3. c. 43 Pr.	6 June 1791
An Act for vesting the settled Estates of Samuel Clowes the Younger Esquire, in the County of Lancaster, in himself in Fee Simple, and for settling an Estate of greater Value, in the same County, in lieu thereof, and in Exchange for the same; and for enabling the said Samuel Clowes to grant building Leases of the Estate hereby settled.
Wolff's Estate Act 1791	31 Geo. 3. c. 44 Pr.	6 June 1791
An Act for amending and rendering effectual the Power of Sale contained in the Marriage Settlement of Sir Jacob Wolff Baronet, and Dame Anne his Wife, so far as such Power relates to, or extends over, the Manor of Chumleigh, and divers Messuages, Lands, and Hereditaments, in the Counties of Devon and Southampton, which have been settled to the Uses therein limited.
Pierrepont's Estate Act 1791	31 Geo. 3. c. 45 Pr.	6 June 1791
An Act to empower Charles Pierrepont Esquire, and his Issue Male, and also the several Tenants for Life, under the Will of the Duke of Kingston, and their respective Issue Male, to grant building Leases.
Sheffield's Estate Act 1791	31 Geo. 3. c. 46 Pr.	6 June 1791
An Act for vesting Part of the Estates late of Sir Charles Sheffield Baronet, deceased, and devised by his Will in strict Settlement, in Trustees, to be sold, and for laying out the Money arising by the Sale thereof in the Purchase of other Estates more contiguous to the Bulk of the Family Estate of the said Sir Charles Sheffield in the County of Lincoln, to be settled to the same Uses.
Wilde's Charity's, Robert Sparrow's and Mary Bence's Estates Act 1791	31 Geo. 3. c. 47 Pr.	6 June 1791
An Act for effectuating and establishing an Exchange agreed upon between the Trustees of Wilde's Charity and Robert Sparrow Esquire, and Mary Bence Spinster, of certain Estates in the County of Suffolk.
Heanor and Codnor (Derbyshire) Inclosure Act 1791	31 Geo. 3. c. 48 Pr.	6 June 1791
An Act for dividing and enclosing certain Commons or Waste Grounds, within the Lordships or Liberties of Heanor and Codnor, in the Parish of Heanor, in the County of Derby.
Gedney Fen Inclosure Act 1791	31 Geo. 3. c. 49 Pr.	6 June 1791
An Act for dividing and enclosing the Common Marshes, Droves, Waste Lands, and Grounds, in the Parish of Gedney, and Hamlet thereof, called Gedney Fen, in the County of Lincoln.
Curdworth and Minworth (Warwickshire) Inclosure Act 1791	31 Geo. 3. c. 50 Pr.	6 June 1791
An Act for dividing and enclosing the Open and Common Fields, Common Meadows, Common Pastures, Heath and Waste Grounds, and other Commonable Lands and Grounds, in the Lordship of Curdworth and Minworth, in the Parish of Curdworth, in the County of Warwick.
Chaddesden Inclosure Act 1791	31 Geo. 3. c. 51 Pr.	6 June 1791
An Act for dividing and enclosing the Open or Common Fields, Meadow, Commons and Waste Grounds, within the Liberty of Chaddesden, in the Parish of Spondon, and County of Derby.
Chippenham Inclosure Act 1791	31 Geo. 3. c. 52 Pr.	6 June 1791
An Act for dividing, enclosing, and laying in Severalty, the Open and Common Fields, Heaths, and Commonable Lands, within the Township of Chippenham, in the County of Cambridge.
Nylands with Badcombe Inclosure Act 1791	31 Geo. 3. c. 53 Pr.	6 June 1791
An Act for dividing and enclosing the Moors or Waste Lands within the Manor and Parish of Nylands with Badcombe, in the County of Somerset.
Stockton Inclosure Act 1791	31 Geo. 3. c. 54 Pr.	6 June 1791
An Act for dividing and enclosing the Common Fields, Common Pastures, Common Meadows, and other Commonable Places, within the Manor and Parish of Stockton, in the County of Warwick.
Sheffield Inclosure Act 1791	31 Geo. 3. c. 55 Pr.	6 June 1791
An Act for dividing and enclosing several Commons and Waste Grounds, Common Fields, and Mesne Enclosures, within the Manor of Sheffield, in the West Riding of the County of York.
Leven Inclosure Act 1791	31 Geo. 3. c. 56 Pr.	6 June 1791
An Act for dividing and enclosing several Lands and Grounds in the Township of Leven, in the Parish of Leven, in the East Riding of the County of York.
Nettleton Inclosure Act 1791	31 Geo. 3. c. 57 Pr.	6 June 1791
An Act for dividing, allotting, and enclosing, the Open and Common Fields, Common Pastures, Moors, and Waste Grounds, within the Parish of Nettleton, in the County of Lincoln.
West and East Langton, Thorpe Langton and Tur Langton (Leicestershire) Inclosure Act 1791	31 Geo. 3. c. 58 Pr.	6 June 1791
An Act for dividing and enclosing the Common and Open Fields, Common Meadows, Common Pastures, Lot Grounds, and other Commonable Lands and Grounds, in the Parish, Townships, or Hamlets of West Langton, East Langton, Thorpe Langton, and Tur Langton, in the County of Leicester.
Oddington Inclosure Act 1791	31 Geo. 3. c. 59 Pr.	6 June 1791
An Act for dividing and enclosing certain Open Common Fields, Commons, Waste, and other Commonable Lands or Grounds, within the Manor and Parish of Oddington, in the County of Oxford.
Edingale Fields Inclosure Act 1791	31 Geo. 3. c. 60 Pr.	6 June 1791
An Act for dividing and enclosing the several Common and Open Fields, Common Meadows, and Common Pastures, commonly called Edingale Fields, within the Parish of Edingale, in the County of Stafford, and the Parish of Croxall, in the County of Derby.
Ludford Inclosure Act 1791	31 Geo. 3. c. 61 Pr.	6 June 1791
An Act for dividing and enclosing the Open Common Fields, Meadows, Pastures, and other Commonable Lands and Waste Grounds, in the Lordship of Ludford, in the County of Lincoln.
Stoke Moor and Draycott Moor (Somerset) Inclosure Act 1791	31 Geo. 3. c. 62 Pr.	6 June 1791
An Act for allotting, dividing, and enclosing certain Moors, Commons, and Waste Lands called Stoke Moor and Draycott Moor, within the Manor and Parish of Rodney Stoke, in the County of Somerset.
Fane's Name Act 1791	31 Geo. 3. c. 63 Pr.	6 June 1791
An Act to enable Henry Hopkins Fane Esquire, and Katherine his Wife, and the Heirs Male of the Body of the said Katherine, to take the Surname of Cholmley only, and to bear the Arms of the Family of the Cholmley's of Whitby and Wentworth of Howsham, pursuant to the Will of Nathaniel Cholmley Esquire, deceased.
Barrar's Name Act 1791	31 Geo. 3. c. 64 Pr.	6 June 1791
An Act to enable Edward Acton Barrar Esquire, and the Heirs Male of his Body, to take the Surname of Acton only, pursuant to the Will of Edward Acton Esquire, deceased.
Leigh's Name Act 1791	31 Geo. 3. c. 65 Pr.	6 June 1791
An Act to enable Thomas Leigh Esquire, and the Heirs Male of his Body, to take and use the Surname and Arms of Hare only.
Bonapace's Naturalization Act 1791	31 Geo. 3. c. 66 Pr.	6 June 1791
An Act for naturalizing Francis Louis Bonapace Esquire.
Ravee's Naturalization Act 1791	31 Geo. 3. c. 67 Pr.	6 June 1791
An Act for naturalizing Anthony Ravee.
Cecil's Divorce Act 1791	31 Geo. 3. c. 68 Pr.	10 June 1791
An Act to dissolve the Marriage of Henry Cecil Esquire with Emma Vernon, his now Wife, and to enable him to marry again; and for other Purposes therein mentioned.
Hope, Lower Kinnerton, and Dodleston (Cheshire) Inclosure Act 1791	31 Geo. 3. c. 69 Pr.	10 June 1791
An Act for dividing, allotting, and enclosing the Commons and Waste Grounds within the Manor of Hope, in the County of Flint, and also a certain Tract of Common or Waste Ground, in the Townships of Lower Kinnerton and Dodleston, within the Manor and Parish of Dodleston in the County of Chester.
Alconbury with Weston (Huntingdonshire) Inclosure Act 1791	31 Geo. 3. c. 70 Pr.	10 June 1791
An Act for dividing and enclosing the Open and Common Fields, Common Pastures, Commons, and Waste Lands, within the Parish of Alconbury-with-Weston, in the County of Huntingdon.
Baldwin Duppa Hancorn's Name Act 1791	31 Geo. 3. c. 71 Pr.	10 June 1791
An Act to enable Baldwin Duppa Hancorn, of Hollingbourne, in the County of Kent, Esquire, and his Heirs, to take and use the Surname and Arms of Duppa, pursuant to the Will of Baldwin Duppa, late of Hollingbourne aforesaid, Esquire, deceased.
Baldwin Hancorn's Name Act 1791	31 Geo. 3. c. 72 Pr.	10 June 1791
An Act to enable Baldwin Hancorn Esquire, and his first and other Sons, and their Issue Male, to take, use, and bear the Name and Arms of Duppa, pursuant to the Will of Baldwin Duppa Esquire, deceased.

=== Sources ===
- Pickering, Danby, ed. (1790). "Anno regni tricesimo primo Georgii III". The Statutes at Large. Vol. 37. pp. 175–426 – via Google Books.
- Journals of the House of Commons. Vol. 46. London: His Majesty's Stationery Office. 1803. pp. 6–707 – via Google Books.
- Journal of the House of Lords. Vol. 39: 1790-1793. pp. 3–259 – via British History Online.
- Chronological Table of and Index to the Statutes. Vol. 1: To the End of the Session 59 Vict. Sess. 2 (1895) (13th ed.). London: Her Majesty's Stationery Office. 1896. pp. 150–151 – via Google Books.

== See also ==
- List of acts of the Parliament of Great Britain
