= 2026 Salford City Council election =

2026 English local government election

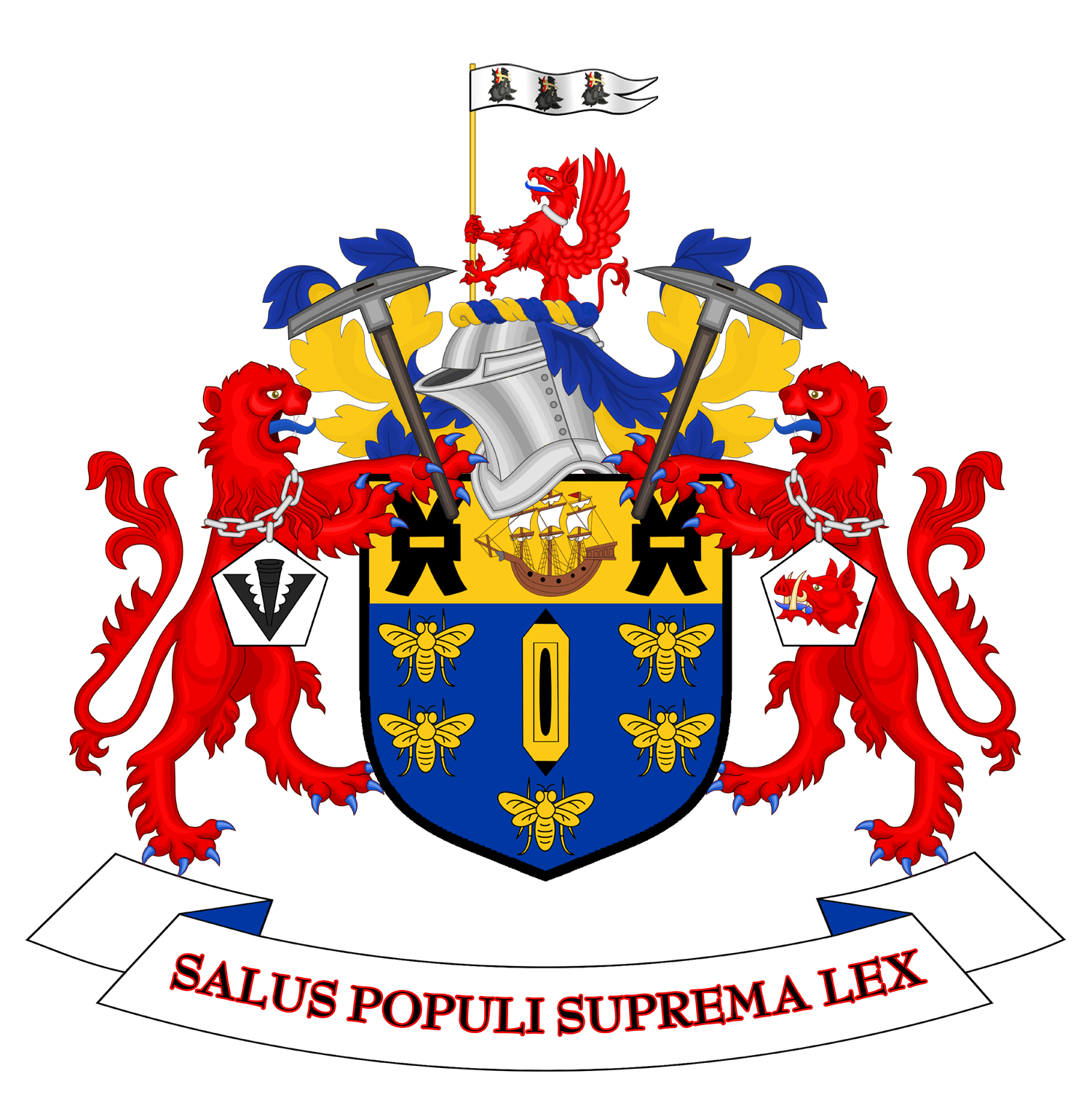
- 7 May 2026

21 out of 60 seats to Salford City Council (including 1 by-election) 31 seats needed for a majority
	First party	Second party	Third party
Leader	Paul Dennett		Bob Clarke
Party	Labour	Reform	Conservative
Last election	50 seats, 58.3%	0 seats, 0.6%	7 seats, 20.7%
Seats before	47 (Note: Including the vacant seat in Blackfriars & Trinity last held by Labour.)	1	7
Seats won	3	13	1
Seats after	34	14	6
Seat change	▼13	▲13	▼1
Popular vote	19,617	24,290	6,868
Percentage	27.8%	34.4%	9.7%
Swing	▼30.5%	▲33.8%	▼11.1%
	Fourth party	Fifth party	Sixth party
Leader	David Jones	Paul Hellbron (defeated)
Party	Green	Liberal Democrats	Independent
Last election	0 seats, 12.5%	2 seats, 5.6%	1 seat, 1.2%
Seats before	0	2	2 (Note: 1 Independent, 1 Your Party.)
Seats won	3	0	1
Seats after	3	1	1
Seat change	▲3	▼1	▼1
Popular vote	14,134	3,924	1,565
Percentage	20.0%	5.6%	2.2%
Swing	▲7.5%	0.0%	▲1.0%
- Winner of each seat at the 2026 Salford City Council election.
Mayor before election
Paul Dennett
Labour
Mayor after election
Paul Dennett
Labour

The 2026 Salford City Council election took place on Thursday 7 May 2026, alongside other local elections in the United Kingdom. One third of the 60 members of Salford City Council in Greater Manchester were elected.

Labour retained overall control of the council, but with a significantly reduced majority. Reform UK, which only had one seat on the council prior to the election, won 13 of the 20 seats contested at this election, making them the second largest party on the council.

== Council composition ==
After 2024 election		Before 2026 election	
Party	Seats	Party	Seats
Labour	50	Labour	45
Conservative	7	Conservative	7
Liberal Democrats	2	Liberal Democrats	2
Your Party	N/A	Your Party	1
Independent	1	Independent	2
Reform	0	Reform	1
Vacant	N/A	Vacant	2

Changes 2024–2026:

- September 2024: Sharmina August (Labour) resigns – by-election held October 2024
- October 2024: Lisa Muir (Labour) wins by-election
- March 2025: John Warmisham (Labour) leaves party to sit as an independent
- May 2025: Bill Hinds (Labour) leaves party to sit as an independent (Note: Part of the Independent Democratic Socialist group.)
- November 2025: Roseanna Wain (Labour) resigns – seat left vacant until 2026 election (Note: Two electors in Barton and Winton requested the vacancy be filled before the regularly scheduled election. This did not occur in Blackfriars and Trinity.)
- December 2025: John Warmisham (Independent) joins Your Party
- February 2026: David Lancaster (Labour) dies – by-election held April 2026
- March 2026: Lewis Nelson (Labour) resigns – by-election to be held after 2026 election
- April 2026: Michael Felse (Reform) gains by-election from Labour

== Background ==
Salford City Council was created in 1974. The city has always voted strongly for Labour. The party has governed in majority since the creation of the council, and has held at least 60% of the council's seats for the entirety of the 21st century. The Conservatives have formed the principal opposition since 2008; prior to this, the Liberal Democrats formed the principal opposition from 1996 to 2004, and held an equal number of seats as the Conservatives from 2004 to 2008.

The 2024 election saw Labour increase their majority despite losing a seat to the Liberal Democrats, by taking one seat from the Conservatives and one from an independent. The 20 seats up for election in 2026 were last contested in 2022. In that election, Labour won 15 seats (down 3), the Conservatives won 2 (up 1), the Liberal Democrats won 2 (up 1), and independents won 1 (up 1). The vacant seat in Blackfriars and Trinity was last held by Labour.

== Summary ==
=== Election result ===
2026 Salford City Council election
Party	This election				Full council			This election		
Party	Candidates	Seats	Net	Seats %	Other	Total	Total %	Votes	Votes %	+/−
Labour	{{{candidates}}}	3	▼13	14.3	31	34	56.7	19,617	27.8	-30.5
Reform	{{{candidates}}}	13	▲13	61.9	1	14	23.3	24,290	34.4	+33.8
Conservative	{{{candidates}}}	1	▼1	4.8	5	6	10.0	6,868	9.7	-11.0
Green	{{{candidates}}}	3	▲3	14.3	0	3	5.0	14,134	20.0	+7.5
Liberal Democrats	{{{candidates}}}	0	▼1	0.0	1	1	1.7	3,924	5.6	±0.0
Independent	{{{candidates}}}	1	Steady	4.8	0	1	1.7	1,565	2.2	+1.0
Advance UK	{{{candidates}}}	0	Steady	0.0	0	0	0.0	101	0.1	N/A
Your Party	{{{candidates}}}	0	▼1	0.0	0	0	0.0	66	0.1	N/A
TUSC	{{{candidates}}}	0	Steady	0.0	0	0	0.0	32	0.1	-0.3

== Incumbents ==
Ward	Incumbent councillor	Party	Re-standing
Barton & Winton	John Mullen	Labour	Yes
Blackfriars & Trinity	Roseanna Wain (Note: Resigned in November 2025. Seat left vacant until the 2026 election.)	Labour	No
Boothstown & Ellenbrook	Les Turner	Conservative	No
Broughton	John Merry	Labour	Yes
Cadishead & Lower Irlam	Yolande Ghola	Labour	No
Claremont	Neil Reynolds	Labour	Yes
Eccles	Nathaniel Tetteh	Labour	Yes
Higher Irlam & Peel Green	Mishal Saeed	Labour	Yes
Kersal & Broughton Park	Andrew Walters	Independent	Yes
Little Hulton	Teresa Pepper	Labour	Yes
Ordsall	Brandan Keville	Labour	Yes
Pendlebury & Clifton	Chioma Mgbeokwere	Labour	Yes
Pendleton & Charlestown	John Warmisham (Note: Originally elected as Labour, but left the party to sit as an independent in March 2025. He joined Your Party in December 2025.)	Your Party	Yes (Note: Standing in Weaste & Seedley ward.)
Quays	Paul Hellbron	Liberal Democrats	Yes
Swinton & Wardley	Gina Reynolds	Labour	No
Swinton Park	Stuart Dickman	Labour	No
Walkden North	Jack Youd	Labour	Yes
Walkden South	Irfan Syed	Labour	Yes
Weaste & Seedley	Alexis Sharma	Labour	Yes
Worsley & Westwood Park	Adam Kealey	Conservative	No

== Ward results ==
=== Barton and Winton ===
Barton and Winton
Party	Candidate	Votes	%	±%
Labour	John Mullen*	1,348	37.2	−24.4
Reform	Yvonne Earnshaw	1,306	36.0	N/A
Green	Babak Sharples	586	16.2	+1.6
Conservative	Holly Muldoon	184	5.1	−9.1
Liberal Democrats	Antony Duke	135	3.7	−4.9
Independent	Kirsty Downie	65	1.79	N/A
Majority		42	1.2	−45.9
Rejected ballots		10	0.28	-0.50
Turnout		3,634	33.4	+8.7
Registered electors		10,890		
Labour hold				

=== Blackfriars and Trinity ===
Blackfriars and Trinity
Party	Candidate	Votes	%	±%
Green	David Jones	1,611	52.6	+27.8
Labour	Darren Matthews	563	18.4	−42.1
Liberal Democrats	Brian Westley	451	14.7	+8.8
Reform	Christopher Roscoe	295	9.6	N/A
Conservative	Craig Russel Walsh	141	4.6	−2.3
Majority		1,048	34.2	N/A
Rejected ballots		6	0.2	-1.8
Turnout		3,061	28.8	−3.7
Registered electors		10,634		
Green gain from Labour		Swing	▲36.0	

=== Boothstown and Ellenbrook ===
Boothstown and Ellenbrook
Party	Candidate	Votes	%	±%
Conservative	Jan Barrington	1,616	34.6	−26.8
Reform	Terry Mather	1,486	31.8	N/A
Labour	Muhammad Kashif	699	15.0	−13.7
Green	Paige Dawson	587	12.6	+5.7
Liberal Democrats	Graham Bates	279	6.0	+3.8
Majority		130	2.8	−29.9
Rejected ballots		7	0.2	-0.7
Turnout		4,674	48.3	+9.0
Registered electors		9,679		
Conservative hold				

=== Broughton ===
Broughton
Party	Candidate	Votes	%	±%
Labour	John Merry	803	32.7	−36.4
Reform	Gary Bardsley	797	32.5	N/A
Green	Kathleen Allen	570	23.2	+10.2
Conservative	Patience Assam	156	6.4	−3.8
Liberal Democrats	Ben Thomas	87	3.5	−2.3
Independent	Hugh Caffrey	40	1.6	N/A
Majority		6	0.2	−55.9
Rejected ballots		14	0.6	-1.3
Turnout		2,467	24.4	+3.5
Registered electors		10,095		
Labour hold				

=== Cadishead and Lower Irlam ===
By-election due to the resignation of councillor Lewis Nelson.

Cadishead and Lower Irlam (2 seats due to by-election)
Party	Candidate	Votes	%	±%
Reform	James Hart	1,626	49.5	N/A
Reform	Leighton Medley	1,494	44.6	N/A
Labour	Bill McLaughlin	1,281	39.0	−30.1
Labour	Ceewhy Ochoga	847	25.8	−43.3
Green	Alex Gravener	410	12.5	−0.5
Green	Matty Wilson	362	11.0	−2.0
Conservative	Skye Ainscough	247	7.5	−2.7
Conservative	Jonathan Thomason	212	6.5	−3.7
Liberal Democrats	Ninad Vivek Oak	115	3.5	−2.3
Rejected ballots		16	0.5	-1.0
Turnout		~3,535	37.5	+11.0
Registered electors		9,434		
Reform gain from Labour				
Reform gain from Labour				

=== Claremont ===
Claremont
Party	Candidate	Votes	%	±%
Reform	Christopher Bates	1,497	37.9	N/A
Labour	Neil Reynolds	1,262	32.0	−34.5
Green	Frederick Seed	732	18.6	+3.3
Conservative	Janet West	234	5.9	−2.3
Liberal Democrats	Ian McKinlay	209	5.3	−3.2
Rejected ballots		8	0.2	-1.2
Turnout		3,942	40.0	+9.7
Registered electors		9,853		
Reform gain from Labour				

=== Eccles ===
Eccles
Party	Candidate	Votes	%	±%
Labour	Nathaniel Tetteh	1,663	38.7	−23.7
Reform	Denis Adshead	1,207	28.1	N/A
Green	Sara Laing	875	20.3	+6.2
Conservative	Janet Reygan	338	7.9	−8.7
Liberal Democrats	Daniel Wells	186	4.3	N/A
TUSC	Sally Griffiths	32	0.7	−5.1
Rejected ballots		8	0.2	-0.9
Turnout		4,309	38.5	+7.8
Registered electors		11,099		
Labour hold				

=== Higher Irlam and Peel Green ===
Higher Irlam and Peel Green
Party	Candidate	Votes	%	±%
Reform	Christopher Evans	1,403	46.1	N/A
Labour	Mishal Saeed	938	30.8	−36.0
Green	Andrew Parkinson	495	16.2	+1.2
Conservative	Akiva Kline	192	6.3	−10.0
Majority		465	15.3	−30.5
Rejected ballots		14	0.5	-1.3
Turnout		3,042	31.5	+6.7
Registered electors		9,669		
Reform gain from Labour				

=== Kersal and Broughton Park ===
Kersal and Broughton Park
Party	Candidate	Votes	%	±%
Independent	Andrew Walters*	1,016	33.5	N/A
Reform	Simon Fan	731	24.1	N/A
Labour	Declan Murphy	454	15.0	−17.9
Conservative	Adam Carney	454	15.0	−39.5
Green	Hormoz Ahmadzadeh	381	12.6	+4.8
Majority		285	9.4	N/A
Rejected ballots		13	0.4	-0.9
Turnout		3,049	31.5	+6.6
Registered electors		9,670		
Independent hold				

=== Little Hulton ===
Little Hulton
Party	Candidate	Votes	%	±%
Reform	Lewis Croden	1,121	43.4	N/A
Labour	Teresa Pepper	837	32.4	−36.2
Green	Mike Ashdown	334	12.9	−0.4
Conservative	Anne Fasan	185	7.2	−9.5
Liberal Democrats	Stuart Oxbrow	103	4.0	N/A
Majority		284	11.2	N/A
Rejected ballots		6	0.2	-1.3
Turnout		2,586	27.5	+8.9
Registered electors		9,410		
Reform gain from Labour				

=== Ordsall ===
Ordsall
Party	Candidate	Votes	%	±%
Green	Martyn Stockley	1,125	40.1	+22.5
Labour	Brendan Keville*	772	27.5	−23.3
Reform	Craig Barclay	428	15.3	N/A
Liberal Democrats	John Grant	332	11.8	−3.3
Conservative	Charlie Ng	147	5.2	−3.9
Majority		353	12.6	N/A
Rejected ballots		7	0.3	-1.2
Turnout		2,804	28.2	+4.3
Registered electors		9,943		
Green gain from Labour		Swing	▲22.9	

=== Pendlebury and Clifton ===
Pendlebury and Clifton
Party	Candidate	Votes	%	±%
Reform	Natalie Rowland	1,627	49.7	N/A
Labour	Chichi Mgbeokwere	755	23.1	−37.1
Green	Andrew Nadin	456	13.9	−0.9
Conservative	Angela Grant	268	8.2	−15.0
Liberal Democrats	Susan Lewis	168	5.1	N/A
Majority		872	26.6	N/A
Rejected ballots		6	0.2	-0.7
Turnout		3,280	36.3	+11.6
Registered electors		9,043		
Reform gain from Labour				

=== Pendleton and Charlestown ===
Pendleton and Charlestown
Party	Candidate	Votes	%	±%
Reform	Daryl Stone-Shaw	963	32.7	N/A
Labour Co-op	Andrew Behan	807	27.4	−35.5
Green	Matthew Callaghan	725	24.6	+11.8
Conservative	Ayotunde Ajibola	254	8.6	−6.6
Liberal Democrats	Kenneth Thompson	143	4.9	−2.4
Independent	Jacob Allen	54	1.8	N/A
Majority		156	5.3	N/A
Rejected ballots		13	0.4	-1.4
Turnout		2,959	28.8	+6.7
Registered electors		10,281		
Reform gain from Your Party				

=== Quays ===
Quays
Party	Candidate	Votes	%	±%
Green	Andrea O’Brien	1,062	42.4	+27.0
Liberal Democrats	Paul Heilbron	874	34.9	−4.2
Labour	Daniel Harold	294	11.7	−25.5
Reform	Owen Hammond	170	6.8	N/A
Conservative	Gary Slawther	103	4.1	−3.8
Majority		188	7.5	N/A
Rejected ballots		6	0.2	-0.3
Turnout		2,509	25.4	+1.2
Registered electors		9,889		
Green gain from Liberal Democrats		Swing	▲15.6	

=== Swinton and Wardley ===
Swinton and Wardley
Party	Candidate	Votes	%	±%
Reform	Peter Jones	1,543	42.0	N/A
Labour	Liz McCoy	980	26.6	−38.2
Green	Anton Strong	627	17.0	+8.2
Conservative	Andy Spratt	258	7.0	−6.6
Liberal Democrats	Colin Seeney	156	4.2	N/A
Independent	Joe O’Neill	114	3.1	−8.7
Majority		563	15.4	N/A
Rejected ballots		10	0.3	-0.7
Turnout		3,688	39.0	+9.4
Registered electors		9,457		
Reform gain from Labour				

=== Swinton Park ===
Swinton Park
Party	Candidate	Votes	%	±%
Reform	Monika Puchalska	1,450	38.5	N/A
Labour	Karl Robson	1,160	30.8	−28.7
Green	Farzam Barghian	570	15.1	+4.0
Conservative	Andrew Wong	333	8.8	−11.1
Liberal Democrats	John McLellan	252	6.7	−1.5
Majority		290	7.7	N/A
Rejected ballots		11	0.3	-1.1
Turnout		3,776	39.5	+9.9
Registered electors		9,571		
Reform gain from Labour				

=== Walkden North ===
Walkden North
Party	Candidate	Votes	%	±%
Reform	Miles Henderson	1,209	39.7	+24.9
Labour	Jack Youd	953	31.3	−31.1
Green	Adam Kenyon	427	14.0	+5.8
Independent	Paul Whitelegg	276	9.1	N/A
Conservative	Arlene Royle	181	5.9	−4.7
Majority		256	8.4	N/A
Rejected ballots		10	0.3	-0.3
Turnout		3,056	32.0	+9.5
Registered electors		9,539		
Reform gain from Labour		Swing	▲28.0	

=== Walkden South ===
Walkden South
Party	Candidate	Votes	%	±%
Reform	Ivan Voronov	1,422	35.9	N/A
Labour	Irfan Syed	1,228	31.0	−20.9
Green	Rachel Fitzsimmons	679	17.1	+9.2
Conservative	Guy Muntu	518	13.1	−11.3
Advance UK	Craig Birtwistle	101	2.5	N/A
Majority		194	4.9	N/A
Rejected ballots		16	0.4	-0.4
Turnout		3,964	42.7	+9.6
Registered electors		9,289		
Reform gain from Labour				

=== Weaste and Seedley ===
Weaste and Seedley
Party	Candidate	Votes	%	±%
Reform	Paul Doyle	1,173	33.3	N/A
Green	James Robertson	949	27.0	+14.7
Labour	Alexis Shama	926	26.3	−33.6
Conservative	Anne Broomhead	212	6.0	−4.2
Liberal Democrats	Oliver Scott	192	5.5	+1.3
Your Party	John Warmisham	66	1.9	N/A
Majority		247	7.0	N/A
Rejected ballots		13	0.4	-1.1
Turnout		3,531	31.7	+7.7
Registered electors		11,146		
Reform gain from Labour				

=== Worsley and Westwood Park ===
Worsley and Westwood Park
Party	Candidate	Votes	%	±%
Reform	Kaiden Morrison	1,342	35.0	N/A
Labour	JP Atley	1,047	27.3	−21.3
Conservative	Daniel Whitehouse	635	16.5	−21.0
Green	Seema Rajpura	571	14.9	+7.2
Liberal Democrats	James Blessing	242	6.3	+1.0
Majority		295	7.7	N/A
Rejected ballots		7	0.2	-0.6
Turnout		3,871	43.6	+7.8
Registered electors		8,880		
Reform gain from Conservative				
