= 2023 Salford City Council election =

2023 local election in Salford

- 4 May 2023

21 of 60 seats on Salford City Council 31 seats needed for a majority
- Turnout: 24.2%

	First party	Second party	Third party
Leader	Paul Dennett	Robin Garrido	Alex Warren
Party	Labour	Conservative	Liberal Democrats
Last election	15 seats (53.7%)	2 seats (20.9%)	2 seats (12.7%)
Seats before	49	8	2
Seats won	18	3	0
Seats after	49	8	2
Seat change	0	0	0
- Winner of each seat at the 2023 Salford City Council election
Council control before election
Paul Dennett
Labour
Subsequent council control
Paul Dennett
Labour

The 2023 Salford City Council elections were held on 4 May 2023 alongside other local elections across the United Kingdom. One third of seats (20) on Salford City Council were up for election, with an additional seat being contested in a by-election in Pendlebury & Clifton.

Labour retained its majority on the council.

== Background ==
=== History ===
The Local Government Act 1972 created a two-tier system of metropolitan counties and districts covering Greater Manchester, Merseyside, South Yorkshire, Tyne and Wear, the West Midlands, and West Yorkshire starting in 1974. Salford was a district of the Greater Manchester metropolitan county. The Local Government Act 1985 abolished the metropolitan counties, with metropolitan districts taking on most of their powers as metropolitan boroughs. The Greater Manchester Combined Authority was created in 2011 and began electing the mayor of Greater Manchester from 2017, which was given strategic powers covering a region coterminous with the former Greater Manchester metropolitan county.

Since its formation, Salford City Council has continuously been under Labour control. In the most recent council election in 2022, Labour won 15 seats, with the Conservatives and Liberal Democrats winning two seats each and an independent politician winning one.

As the Local Government Boundary Commission for England produced new boundaries for Manchester ahead of the 2021 election, meaning that the 2021 elections were all-out, with all councillors being elected before returning to electing by thirds, candidates up for re-election in 2023 are those who came second in each ward in 2021.

== Electoral process ==
The council elects its councillors in thirds, with a third being up for election every year for three years, with no election in the fourth year. The election took place by first-past-the-post voting, with wards generally being represented by three councillors, with one elected in each election year to serve a four-year term.

All registered electors (British, Irish, Commonwealth and European Union citizens) living in Salford aged 18 or over were entitled to vote in the election. People who lived at two addresses in different councils, such as university students with different term-time and holiday addresses, were entitled to be registered for and vote in elections in both local authorities. Voting in-person at polling stations took place from 07:00 to 22:00 on election day, and voters were able to apply for postal votes or proxy votes in advance of the election.

== Summary ==
=== Election result ===
2023 Salford City Council election
Party	This election			Full council			This election		
Party	Seats	Net	Seats %	Other	Total	Total %	Votes	Votes %	+/−
Labour	18	Steady	85.7	31	49	81.7	26,746	57.3	▲3.6
Conservative	3	Steady	14.3	5	8	13.3	10,979	23.5	▲2.6
Liberal Democrats	0	Steady	0.0	2	2	3.3	3,830	8.2	▼4.5
Independent	0	Steady	0.0	1	1	1.7	411	0.9	▼3.4
Green	0	Steady	0.0	0	0	0.0	4,023	8.6	▲2.1
Britain First	0	Steady	0.0	0	0	0.0	405	0.9	▼0.2
Women's Equality	0	Steady	0.0	0	0	0.0	109	0.2	▼0.4
TUSC	0	Steady	0.0	0	0	0.0	93	0.2	0.0
Reform	0	Steady	0.0	0	0	0.0	68	0.1	N/A
SDP	0	Steady	0.0	0	0	0.0	40	0.1	N/A

== Ward results ==
Asterisks denote incumbent councillors seeking re-election.

=== Barton & Winton ===
Barton and Winton
Party	Candidate	Votes	%	±%
Labour	David Anthony Lancaster*	1,561	68.1	−3.7
Conservative	Bernard Goldfine	320	14.0	−5.8
Green	Daniel Towers	262	11.4	N/A
Liberal Democrats	Antony Duke	135	5.9	−1.7
Majority		1,241	54.2	
Rejected ballots		13	0.6	
Turnout		2,291	21.5	
Registered electors		10,666		
Labour hold		Swing		

=== Blackfriars & Trinity ===
Blackfriars and Trinity
Party	Candidate	Votes	%	±%
Labour	Emma Louise Cammell	1,025	60.0	−5.4
Green	David Jones	455	26.7	+7.1
Conservative	Charlie Ng	150	8.8	N/A
Liberal Democrats	Scott James Turner-Preece	62	2.6	−10.8
Majority		570	33.4	
Rejected ballots		15	0.9	
Turnout		1,707	19.5	
Registered electors		8,772		
Labour hold		Swing		

=== Boothstown & Ellenbrook ===
Boothstown and Ellenbrook
Party	Candidate	Votes	%	±%
Conservative	Darren Ward*	1,874	55.8	+7.4
Labour	Su Matthews	1,065	31.8	+0.4
Liberal Democrats	Ian Leslie Chisnall	222	6.6	−3.9
Green	Diana Joy Battersby	180	5.4	−3.4
Majority		809	24.0	
Rejected ballots		12	0.4	
Turnout		3,353		
Registered electors		9,691		
Conservative hold		Swing		

=== Broughton ===
Broughton
Party	Candidate	Votes	%	±%
Labour Co-op	Jim King*	1,333	70.0	+6.0
Conservative	Patience Assam	273	14.3	+3.0
Green	David Joseph Henry	194	10.2	+1.6
Liberal Democrats	Ben Web	83	4.4	−4.8
Majority		1,060	55.7	
Rejected ballots		20	1.1	
Turnout		1,903	19.6	
Registered electors		9,714		
Labour hold		Swing		

=== Cadishead & Lower Irlam ===
Cadishead and Lower Irlam
Party	Candidate	Votes	%	±%
Labour	Hannah Jane Robinson-Smith*	1,562	73.4	+13.7
Conservative	Jackie Mountaine	424	19.9	−0.4
Liberal Democrats	Ninad Vivek Oak	120	5.6	−12.8
Majority		1,138	53.5	
Rejected ballots		22	1.0	
Turnout		2,128	22.6	
Registered electors		9,399		
Labour hold		Swing		

=== Claremont ===
Claremont
Party	Candidate	Votes	%	±%
Labour	Michael Thomas Pevitt*	1,606	61.5	+3.9
Conservative	Myrella Saunders	397	15.2	+1.1
Green	Christopher Seed	316	12.1	+2.4
Liberal Democrats	Ian Alexander McKinlay	279	10.7	+4.0
Majority		1,209	46.3	
Rejected ballots		12	0.5	
Turnout		2,610	26.8	
Registered electors		9,748		
Labour hold		Swing		

=== Eccles ===
Eccles
Party	Candidate	Votes	%	±%
Labour	Mike McCusker*	2,022	65.5	+5.6
Conservative	Karim Benze	482	15.6	−6.7
Green	Nicola Smith	373	12.1	+4.0
TUSC	Sally Griffiths	93	3.0	N/A
Liberal Democrats	John Richard Bridges	92	3.0	−3.3
Majority		1,540	49.9	
Rejected ballots		23	0.7	
Turnout		3,085	28.1	
Registered electors		10,983		
Labour hold		Swing		

=== Higher Irlam & Peel Green ===
Higher Irlam and Peel Green
Party	Candidate	Votes	%	±%
Labour	John David Walsh	1,280	65.3	+2.1
Conservative	Paul Worcester	357	18.2	−0.1
Green	Jack Smith	193	9.8	N/A
Liberal Democrats	Spencer Martin Fairbrother	116	5.9	−11.6
Majority		923	47.1	
Rejected ballots		14	0.7	
Turnout		1,960	20.3	
Registered electors		9,670		
Labour hold		Swing		

=== Kersal & Broughton Park ===
Kersal & Broughton Park
Party	Candidate	Votes	%	±%
Conservative	Ari Leitner*	1,629	58.2	+28.2
Labour	Philip Wilson-Marks	756	27.0	+0.6
Independent	Yirmiyahu Harari	157	5.6	N/A
Green	James Thomas Bullen	137	4.9	N/A
Liberal Democrats	Jamie Twells	102	3.6	−1.5
Majority		873	31.2	
Rejected ballots		16	0.6	
Turnout		2,797	29.5	
Registered electors		9,491		
Conservative hold		Swing		

=== Little Hulton ===
Little Hulton
Party	Candidate	Votes	%	±%
Labour	Robert Andrew Sharpe*	1,048	68.0	+4.3
Conservative	Dorothy Chapman	304	19.7	−3.9
Green	Stuart Oxbrow	100	6.5	−0.3
Liberal Democrats	Stuart Michael Robbins	79	5.1	−0.2
Majority		744	48.3	
Rejected ballots		11	0.7	
Turnout		1,542	16.8	
Registered electors		9,164		
Labour hold		Swing		

=== Ordsall ===
Ordsall
Party	Candidate	Votes	%	±%
Labour	Benjamin Grogan	931	48.1	+7.4
Liberal Democrats	Paul Darren Heilbron	695	35.9	−9.8
Green	Jane Ransley	195	10.1	−2.6
Conservative	Emma Wade-Gledhill	105	5.4	N/A
Majority		236	12.2	
Rejected ballots		11	0.6	
Turnout		1,937	22.5	
Registered electors		8,618		
Labour hold		Swing		

=== Pendlebury & Clifton ===
By-election due to the resignation of councillor Sophia Linden.

Pendlebury & Clifton (2 seats due to by-election)
Party	Candidate	Votes	%	±%
Labour	Barry Warner*	1,234	59.0	−2.9
Labour	Chioma Mgbeokwere	1,071	51.2	−10.7
Conservative	Adam Carney	499	23.9	−2.1
Conservative	Chris Cunliffe	334	16.0	−10.0
Green	Kathleen Frances Allen	245	11.7	N/A
Green	Tamara Reilly	180	8.6	N/A
Liberal Democrats	Kenneth William Thompson	161	7.7	−3.5
Rejected ballots		3		
Turnout		2,094	23.2	
Registered electors		9,039		
Labour hold				
Labour hold				

=== Pendleton & Charlestown ===
Pendleton & Charlestown
Party	Candidate	Votes	%	±%
Labour	Wilson Nkurunziza*	1,134	65.0	−1.4
Conservative	Martin Christopher Goodman	248	14.2	−1.1
Green	Adam John Smithson	210	12.0	+1.5
Liberal Democrats	Benjamin James Thomas	131	7.5	+0.6
Majority		886	50.8	
Rejected ballots		22	1.3	
Turnout		1,745	18.6	
Registered electors		9,388		
Labour hold		Swing		

=== Quays ===
Quays
Party	Candidate	Votes	%	±%
Labour	Jake Rowland*	741	45.0	+14.0
Liberal Democrats	Jonathan Moore	613	37.2	−22.9
Green	Andrew Nadin	150	9.1	+0.8
Conservative	Dan Swift	135	8.2	N/A
Majority		128	7.8	
Rejected ballots		9	0.5	
Turnout		1,648	22.1	
Registered electors		7,456		
Labour hold		Swing		

=== Swinton & Wardley ===
Swinton & Wardley
Party	Candidate	Votes	%	±%
Labour	Bill Hinds*	1,621	63.6	+2.4
Conservative	Sarah Wanjiku	361	14.2	−2.0
Independent	Joe O'Neill	254	10.0	N/A
Green	Liam James Cantona Waite	180	7.1	+1.2
Liberal Democrats	Gareth Joseph Watkins	120	4.7	+0.6
Majority		1,260	49.4	
Rejected ballots		13	0.5	
Turnout		2,549	27.2	
Registered electors		9,383		
Labour hold		Swing		

=== Swinton Park ===
Swinton Park
Party	Candidate	Votes	%	±%
Labour	Jim Cammell*	1,590	63.2	+5.9
Conservative	Miranda Friedman	459	18.3	−0.3
Liberal Democrats	John Howard McLellan	236	9.4	+1.5
Green	Lisa Swarbrick	216	8.6	+1.7
Majority		1,131	44.9	
Rejected ballots		14	0.6	
Turnout		2,515	26.7	
Registered electors		9,418		
Labour hold		Swing		

=== Walkden North ===
Walkden North
Party	Candidate	Votes	%	±%
Labour	Sammie Bellamy*	1,244	55.5	+4.0
Britain First	Ashlea Simon	405	18.1	−3.5
Conservative	Derek Barry Meades	238	10.6	−0.8
Green	Frederick Roy Battersby	162	7.2	−1.9
Liberal Democrats	Susan Vanessa Lewis	113	5.0	−1.1
Reform	Craig Birtwistle	68	3.0	N/A
Majority		839	37.4	
Rejected ballots		10	0.4	
Turnout		2,240	23.6	
Registered electors		9,490		
Labour hold		Swing		

=== Walkden South ===
Walkden South
Party	Candidate	Votes	%	±%
Labour Co-op	Hilaria Asumu	1,318	52.1	+5.3
Conservative	Janet Hainey	754	29.8	+5.2
Green	Anna Elizabeth Mackinlay Totterdill	257	10.2	−7.8
Liberal Democrats	Rowan Cerys Blessing	178	7.0	−2.9
Majority		564	22.3	
Rejected ballots		25	1.0	
Turnout		2,532	28.1	
Registered electors		9,001		
Labour hold		Swing		

=== Weaste & Seedley ===
Weaste & Seedley
Party	Candidate	Votes	%	±%
Labour	Charlotte Youd	1,438	65.8	+2.1
Conservative	Alan Lederberger	244	11.2	N/A
Green	Andrea Romero O'Brien	170	7.8	N/A
Liberal Democrats	John Grant	169	7.7	−13.6
Women's Equality	Donna-Maree Louise Humphery	109	5.0	−8.0
SDP	Stephen James Lewthwaite	40	1.8	N/A
Majority		1,194	54.6	
Rejected ballots		14	0.6	
Turnout		2,184	20.1	
Registered electors		10,842		
Labour hold		Swing		

=== Worsley & Westwood Park ===
Worsley & Westwood Park
Party	Candidate	Votes	%	±%
Conservative	Robin John Garrido*	1,392	48.2	+0.2
Labour	Michelle Mullen	1,166	40.4	−2.6
Green	Christopher Bertenshaw	193	6.7	N/A
Liberal Democrats	James Karl Blessing	124	4.3	−4.0
Majority		226	7.8	
Rejected ballots		12	0.4	
Turnout		2,887	32.4	
Registered electors		8,922		
Conservative hold		Swing		

== Changes since this election ==
=== Quays by-election ===
A by-election was held on 11 January 2024 following the resignation of Alex Warren after he took up a politically-restricted role.

Changes below are with the 2023 elections, not the 2022 election when the incumbent councillor was elected.

Quays by-election
Party	Candidate	Votes	%	±%
Liberal Democrats	Paul Heilbron	540	54.8	+17.6
Labour	Elizabeth McCoy	321	32.6	−12.4
Green	Andrea O'Brien	124	12.6	+3.5
Majority		219	22.2	
Total valid votes		985		
Rejected ballots		8		
Turnout		993	12.3	−9.8
Liberal Democrats hold		Swing	+15.0	
