= 2024 Salford City Council election =

2024 local election in Salford

- 2 May 2024

21 of 60 seats on Salford City Council 31 seats needed for a majority
- Turnout: 26% ▼2.20%

	First party	Second party
Leader	Paul Dennett	Robin Garrido
Party	Labour	Conservative
Last election	18 seats (57.3%)	3 seats (23.5%)
Seats before	49	8
Seats after	50	7
Seat change	▲1	▼1
	Third party	Fourth party
Leader	Paul Heilbron
Party	Liberal Democrats	Independent
Last election	0 seats (8.2%)
Seats before	1	2 (Note: Including one vacant seat last held by Chris Twells who been elected as a Liberal Democrat but then left the party and sat as an independent until his resignation in March 2024.)
Seats after	2	1
Seat change	▲1	▼1
- Map of the results
Council control before election
Labour
Council control after election
Labour

The 2024 Salford City Council elections took place on 2 May 2024 alongside other local elections across the United Kingdom. Twenty-one seats on Salford City Council were up for election; one in each ward, and one additional seat in Ordsall to fill a casual vacancy.

The Labour Party retained control of the council. The incumbent Labour mayor, Paul Dennett, was also re-elected to the post of Mayor of Salford at the mayoral election held on the same day.

== Background ==
In the most recent council election in 2022, Labour won 15 seats, with the Conservatives and Liberal Democrats winning two seats each and an independent politician winning one.

As the Local Government Boundary Commission for England produced new boundaries for Salford ahead of the 2021 election, meaning that all councillors were elected before returning to electing by thirds, candidates up for re-election in 2024 are those who came first in each ward in 2021.

=== Changes since last election ===
In November 2023 Liberal Democrats councillor Alex Warren (Quays ward) resigned after he took up a politically restricted role. A by-election was held on 11 January 2024 which was won by Paul Heilbron for the Lib Dems.

During the 2023 local elections, Chris Twells, the Liberal Democrat councillor for Ordsall since 2022, sought to simultaneously become a councillor in Cotswold District Council, standing in the Tetbury with Upton ward. He subsequently won both seats, with the Cotswold one being an upset victory in a previously safe Conservative seat. Twells resigned his Ordsall seat on March 15, 2024. The seat was therefore vacant and a by-election was held on the same day as the 2024 local elections.

== Electoral process ==
The council elects its councillors in thirds, with a third being up for election every year for three years, with no election in the fourth year. The election took place by first-past-the-post voting, with wards generally being represented by three councillors, with one elected in each election year to serve a four-year term.

All registered electors (British, Irish, Commonwealth and European Union citizens) living in Salford aged 18 or over were entitled to vote in the election. People who lived at two addresses in different councils, such as university students with different term-time and holiday addresses, were entitled to be registered for and vote in elections in both local authorities. Voting in-person at polling stations took place from 07:00 to 22:00 on election day, and voters were able to apply for postal votes or proxy votes in advance of the election.

== Results summary ==
Labour retained its majority on the council, making a net gain of one seat.

=== Election result ===
2024 Salford City Council election
Party	This election			Full council			This election		
Party	Seats	Net	Seats %	Other	Total	Total %	Votes	Votes %	+/−
Labour	18	▲1	85.7	32	50	83.3	30,566	58.3	+1.0
Conservative	2	▼1	9.5	5	7	11.7	10,837	20.7	−2.8
Liberal Democrats	1	0	4.8	1	2	3.3	2,952	5.6	−2.6
Green	0	0	0.0	0	0	0.0	6,555	12.5	+3.9
Independent	0	0	0.0	1	1	1.7	642	1.2	+0.3
Reform	0	0	0.0	0	0	0.0	321	0.6	+0.5
Women's Equality	0	0	0.0	0	0	0.0	240	0.5	+0.3
TUSC	0	0	0.0	0	0	0.0	198	0.4	+0.2
Communist	0	0	0.0	0	0	0.0	77	0.1	N/A

== Ward results ==
Salford City Council released the list of candidates in early April.

Asterisks denote incumbent councillors seeking re-election.

=== Barton and Winton Ward ===
Barton and Winton
Party	Candidate	Votes	%	±%
Labour	Jacqui Fahy	1,633	61.6	−6.5
Green	Jack Smith	386	14.6	+3.2
Conservative	Janet Meades-Smith	375	14.2	+0.2
Liberal Democrats	Antony Duke	228	8.6	+2.7
Rejected ballots		28	1.1	
Majority		1247	47.1	
Turnout		2650	24.7	
Registered electors		10,729		
Labour hold		Swing		

=== Blackfriars & Trinity ===
Blackfriars and Trinity
Party	Candidate	Votes	%	±%
Labour	Jane Hamilton*	1,433	60.5	+0.5
Green	David Jones	587	24.8	−1.9
Conservative	Craig Walsh	164	6.9	−1.9
Liberal Democrats	Stuart Oxbrow	139	5.9	+3.3
Rejected ballots		47	2.0	
Majority		846	35.7	
Turnout		2370	25.1	
Registered electors		9,439		
Labour hold		Swing		

=== Boothstown & Ellenbrook ===
Boothstown and Ellenbrook
Party	Candidate	Votes	%	±%
Conservative	Bob Clarke*	2,339	61.4	+5.6
Labour	Darren Matthews	1092	28.7	−3.1
Green	Diana Battersby	263	6.9	+1.5
Liberal Democrats	Ian Chisnall	82	2.2	−4.4
Rejected ballots		33	0.9	
Majority		1247	32.7	
Turnout		3809	39.3	
Registered electors		9,705		
Conservative hold		Swing		

=== Broughton ===
Broughton
Party	Candidate	Votes	%	±%
Labour	Maria Brabiner*	1,440	69.1	−0.9
Green	David Henry	271	13.0	+2.8
Conservative	Saqib Aftab	213	10.2	−4.1
Liberal Democrats	Ben Web	120	5.8	+1.4
Rejected ballots		39	1.9	
Majority		1169	56.1	
Turnout		2083	20.9	+5.76
Registered electors		9,951		
Labour hold		Swing		

=== Cadishead & Lower Irlam ===
Cadishead and Lower Irlam
Party	Candidate	Votes	%	±%
Labour	Lewis Nelson*	2,024	80.8	+7.4
Conservative	Michael Richman	287	11.5	−8.4
Green	Jane Ransley	156	6.2	+0.6
Rejected ballots		38	1.5	
Majority		1737	69.3	
Turnout		2505	26.5	
Registered electors		9,437		
Labour hold		Swing		

=== Claremont ===
Claremont
Party	Candidate	Votes	%	±%
Labour	Barbara Bentham*	1,991	66.5	+5.0
Green	Christopher Seed	458	15.3	+3.2
Liberal Democrats	Ian McKinlay	255	8.5	−2.2
Conservative	Alima Husain	245	8.2	−7.0
Rejected ballots		43	1.4	
Majority		1533	51.2	
Turnout		2992	30.3	
Registered electors		9,860		
Labour hold		Swing		

=== Eccles ===
Eccles
Party	Candidate	Votes	%	±%
Labour	Sharmina August*	2,121	62.4	−3.1
Conservative	Paul Worcester	565	16.6	+1.0
Green	Nicola Smith	479	14.1	+2.0
TUSC	Sally Griffiths	198	5.8	+2.8
Rejected ballots		37	1.1	
Majority		1556	45.8	
Turnout		3400	30.7	
Registered electors		11,069		
Labour hold		Swing		

=== Higher Irlam & Peel Green ===
Higher Irlam and Peel Green
Party	Candidate	Votes	%	±%
Labour	Tracy Kelly*	1,431	66.9	+1.6
Conservative	Dorothy Chapman	349	16.3	−1.9
Green	Nathan Ashmall	322	15.0	+5.2
Rejected ballots		38	1.8	
Majority		1082	50.6	
Turnout		2140	22.0	
Registered electors		9,716		
Labour hold		Swing		

=== Kersal & Broughton Park ===
Kersal & Broughton Park
Party	Candidate	Votes	%	±%
Conservative	Arnie Saunders*	1,289	53.8	−4.4
Labour	Muhammad Kashif	779	32.5	+5.5
Green	Nel Scroggie	183	7.6	+2.7
Liberal Democrats	Ben Thomas	115	4.8	+1.2
Rejected ballots		31	1.3	
Majority		510	21.3	
Turnout		2397	24.9	
Registered electors		9,615		
Conservative hold		Swing		

=== Little Hulton ===
Little Hulton
Party	Candidate	Votes	%	±%
Labour	Tony Davies	1,173	68.6	+0.6
Conservative	Myrella Saunders	285	16.7	−3.0
Green	Jane Wood	227	13.3	+6.8
Rejected ballots		25	1.5	
Majority		888	51.9	
Turnout		1710	18.6	
Registered electors		9,203		
Labour hold		Swing		

=== Ordsall ===
By-election due to the resignation of councillor Chris Twells.

Ordsall (double vacancy)
Party	Candidate	Votes	%	±%
Labour	Tanya Burch*	1,292	58.3	+10.2
Labour	Brendan Kerville	1,127	50.8	+2.7
Green	Jack Owens	391	17.6	+7.5
Green	Michael Scantlebury	361	16.3	+6.2
Liberal Democrats	John Grant	335	15.1	−20.8
Conservative	Charlie Ng	202	9.1	+3.7
Conservative	Jay Talukdar	135	6.1	+0.7
Rejected ballots		21	0.9	
Turnout		2217	23.9	
Registered electors		9,285		
Labour hold				
Labour gain from Independent				

=== Pendlebury & Clifton ===
Pendlebury & Clifton
Party	Candidate	Votes	%	±%
Labour	Su Matthews	1,341	60.2	+1.2
Conservative	Angela Grant	517	23.2	−0.7
Green	Kathleen Allen	330	14.8	+3.1
Rejected ballots		41	1.8	
Majority		824	37.0	
Turnout		2229	24.7	
Registered electors		9,020		
Labour hold		Swing		

=== Pendleton & Charlestown ===
Pendleton & Charlestown
Party	Candidate	Votes	%	±%
Labour	Michele Barnes*	1,367	62.9	−2.1
Conservative	Adam Carney	330	15.2	+1.0
Green	Adam Skyrme	278	12.8	+0.8
Liberal Democrats	Kenneth Thompson	158	7.3	−0.2
Rejected ballots		39	1.8	
Majority		1037	47.7	
Turnout		2172	22.1	
Registered electors		9,843		
Labour hold		Swing		

=== Quays ===
Quays
Party	Candidate	Votes	%	±%
Liberal Democrats	Jonathan Moore	794	39.1	+1.9
Labour	Liz McCoy	756	37.2	−7.8
Green	Andrea Romero O'Brien	312	15.4	+6.3
Conservative	Derek Meades	161	7.9	−0.3
Rejected ballots		10	0.5	-0.1
Majority		38	1.9	
Turnout		2033	24.2	+2.1
Registered electors		8,398		
Liberal Democrats gain from Labour		Swing		

- Compared with 2023

=== Swinton & Wardley ===
Swinton & Wardley
Party	Candidate	Votes	%	±%
Labour	Jim Dawson*	1,818	64.8	+1.2
Conservative	Jackie Mountaine	381	13.6	−0.6
Independent	Joseph O'Neill	331	11.8	+1.8
Green	Liam Waite	246	8.8	+1.7
Rejected ballots		28	1.0	
Majority		1437	51.2	
Turnout		2804	29.6	
Registered electors		9,473		
Labour hold		Swing		

=== Swinton Park ===
Swinton Park
Party	Candidate	Votes	%	±%
Labour	Heather Fletcher*	1,671	59.5	−3.7
Conservative	Glenn Croston	558	19.9	+1.6
Green	Lisa Swarbrick	311	11.1	+2.5
Liberal Democrats	John McLellan	230	8.2	−1.2
Rejected ballots		39	1.4	
Majority		1113	39.6	
Turnout		2809	29.6	
Registered electors		9,507		
Labour hold		Swing		

=== Walkden North ===
Walkden North
Party	Candidate	Votes	%	±%
Labour	Adrian Brocklehurst*	1,351	62.4	+6.9
Reform	Craig Birtwistle	321	14.8	+11.8
Conservative	Kausar George	230	10.6	±0.0
Green	Frederick Battersby	177	8.2	+1.0
Liberal Democrats	Scott Turner-Preece	73	3.4	−1.6
Rejected ballots		13	0.6	
Majority		1030	47.6	
Turnout		2165	22.5	
Registered electors		9,614		
Labour hold		Swing		

=== Walkden South ===
Walkden South
Party	Candidate	Votes	%	±%
Labour	Joshua Brooks*	1,575	51.9	−0.2
Conservative	Christopher Bates	740	24.4	−5.4
Independent	Paul Whitelegg	311	10.3	N/A
Green	Tom Dylan	244	8.0	−2.2
Liberal Democrats	Rowan Blessing	140	4.6	−2.4
Rejected ballots		24	0.8	
Majority		835	27.5	
Turnout		3034	33.1	
Registered electors		9,178		
Labour hold		Swing		

=== Weaste & Seedley ===
Weaste & Seedley
Party	Candidate	Votes	%	±%
Labour	Phil Cusak*	1,595	59.9	−5.9
Green	Andrew Nadin	327	12.3	+4.5
Conservative	Dan Whitehouse	271	10.2	−1.0
Women's Equality	Carmen Wood-Hope	240	9.0	+4.0
Liberal Democrats	Ninad Oak	112	4.2	−3.5
Communist	Chris Neville	77	2.9	N/A
Rejected ballots		41	1.5	
Majority		1268	47.6	
Turnout		2663	24.0	
Registered electors		11,090		
Labour hold		Swing		

=== Worsley & Westwood Park ===
Worsley & Westwood Park
Party	Candidate	Votes	%	±%
Labour	James Prady	1,556	48.6	+8.2
Conservative	Lewis Ormston	1201	37.5	−10.7
Green	Sara Laing	246	7.7	+1.0
Liberal Democrats	James Blessing	171	5.3	+1.0
Rejected ballots		26	0.8	
Majority		355	11.1	
Turnout		3200	35.8	
Registered electors		8,952		
Labour gain from Conservative		Swing		

== Changes 2024-2026 ==
=== By-elections ===
==== Eccles ====
By-election due to the resignation of councillor Sharmina August.

Eccles by-election: 31 October 2024
Party	Candidate	Votes	%	±%
Labour	Lisa Muir	951	51.2	–11.2
Conservative	Daniel Whitehouse	426	23.0	+6.4
Green	Sara Lang	261	14.1	±0.0
Liberal Democrats	Ian McKinley	142	7.7	N/A
TUSC	Sally Griffiths	76	4.1	–1.7
Majority		525	28.2	–17.6
Turnout		1,888	16.5	–14.2
Registered electors		11,470		
Labour hold		Swing	▼8.8	

==== Barton & Winton ====
By-election due to the death of councillor David Lancaster.

Barton & Winton by-election, 22 April 2026
Party	Candidate	Votes	%	±%
Reform	Michael James Felse	676	34.9	N/A
Labour	Catherine Goodyer	643	33.2	−35.3
Green	Jack Groom	363	18.7	+7.1
Conservative	Holly Ann Muldoon	118	6.1	−7.9
Liberal Democrats	Antony Ian Duke	94	4.9	−1.0
Independent	Kirsty Anne Downie	44	2.3	N/A
Majority		33	1.7	
Turnout		1,941	17.82	
Reform gain from Labour		Swing	35.1	
