= Walkden North =

- Electoral ward
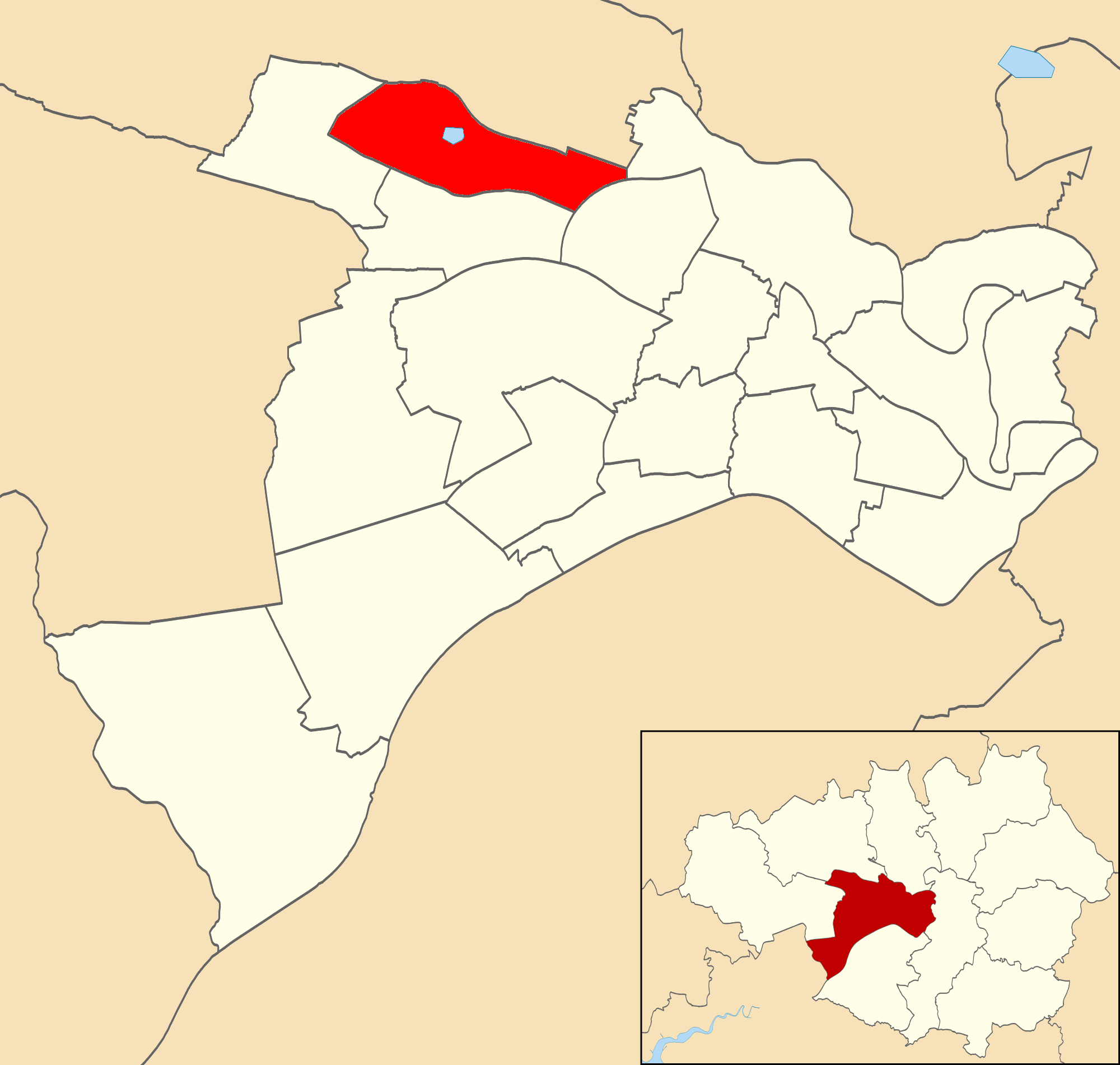
- Walkden North ward within Salford City Council.

- Coat of arms
- Motto: Let the good (or safety) of the people be the supreme (or highest) law
- Interactive map of Walkden North
- Coordinates: 53.534°N 2.400°W
- Country: United Kingdom
- Constituent country: England
- Region: North West England
- County: Greater Manchester
- Metropolitan borough: Salford
- Created: May 2004
- Named for: Walkden

Government UK Parliament constituency: Worsley and Eccles South
  - Type: Unicameral
  - Body: Salford City Council
  - Mayor of Salford: Paul Dennett (Labour)
  - Councillor: Adrian Brocklehurst (Labour Co-operative)
  - Councillor: Samantha Bellamy (Labour)
  - Councillor: Jack Youd (Labour)

Population
  - Total: 13,555
- Ward profile conducted by Salford City Council in 2024.

Walkden North is an area and electoral ward of Salford, England. It is represented in Westminster by Yasmin Quereshi MP for Bolton South and Walkden. Information from the 2021 Census recorded a population of 13,555.

== Councillors ==
The ward is represented by three councillors:

- Adrian Brocklehurst (The Labour and Co-operative Party)
- Samantha (Sammie) Bellamy (The Labour Party)
- Jack Youd (The Labour Party)

Councillor Jack Youd is Deputy City Mayor and Lead Member for Finance, Support Services and Regeneration. Cllr Youd is a Unison Trade Union Official, Company Secretary of the Salford Unemployed and Community Resource Centre and a School Governor at Christ the King Primary School. His partner is an Assistant Head Teacher.

Councillor Sammie Bellamy is Deputy Chair of Health and Adult Scrutiny Panel. Councillor Bellamy is on the Forhousing Customer Committee and owns a property in Winton.

Councillor Adrian Brocklehurst is Chair of the Children's Scrutiny Panel. Councillor Brocklehurst is employed as a Health and Safety Manager at Manchester City Council and owns a property in Walkden.

Election	Councillor	Councillor	Councillor
2004	Barbara Miller (Lab)	William Pennington (Lab)	Vincent Devine (Lab)
2006	Barbara Miller (Lab)	William Pennington (Lab)	Vincent Devine (Lab)
2007	Barbara Miller (Lab)	William Pennington (Lab)	Vincent Devine (Lab)
2008	Barbara Miller (Lab)	William Pennington (Lab)	Vincent Devine (Lab)
2010	Adrian Brocklehurst (Lab Co-op)	William Pennington (Lab)	Vincent Devine (Lab)
By-election; 3 March 2011	Adrian Brocklehurst (Lab Co-op)	William Pennington (Lab)	Brendan Ryan (Lab)
2011	Adrian Brocklehurst (Lab Co-op)	William Pennington (Lab)	Brendan Ryan (Lab)
2012	Adrian Brocklehurst (Lab Co-op)	William Pennington (Lab)	Brendan Ryan (Lab)
2014	Adrian Brocklehurst (Lab Co-op)	William Pennington (Lab)	Brendan Ryan (Lab)
2015	Adrian Brocklehurst (Lab Co-op)	Samantha Bellamy (Lab)	Brendan Ryan (Lab)
2016	Adrian Brocklehurst (Lab Co-op)	Samantha Bellamy (Lab)	Brendan Ryan (Lab)
2018	Adrian Brocklehurst (Lab Co-op)	Samantha Bellamy (Lab)	Brendan Ryan (Lab)
2019	Adrian Brocklehurst (Lab Co-op)	Samantha Bellamy (Lab)	Brendan Ryan (Lab)
2021	Adrian Brocklehurst (Lab Co-op)	Samantha Bellamy (Lab)	Jack Youd (Lab)
2022	Adrian Brocklehurst (Lab Co-op)	Samantha Bellamy (Lab)	Jack Youd (Lab)
2023	Adrian Brocklehurst (Lab Co-op)	Samantha Bellamy (Lab)	Jack Youd (Lab)
2024	Adrian Brocklehurst (Lab Co-op)	Samantha Bellamy (Lab)	Jack Youd (Lab)

indicates seat up for re-election. indicates seat won in by-election.

== Elections in 2020s ==
=== May 2024 ===
2024
Party	Candidate	Votes	%	±%
Labour	Adrian Brocklehurst*	1,351	62.4	+6.9
Reform	Craig Birtwistle	321	14.8	+11.8
Conservative	Kausar George	230	10.6	±0.0
Green	Frederick Battersby	177	8.2	+1.0
Liberal Democrats	Scott Turner-Preece	73	3.4	−1.6
Majority		1030	47.6	
Turnout		2165	22.5	
Registered electors		9,614		
Labour hold		Swing		

=== May 2023 ===
2023
Party	Candidate	Votes	%	±%
Labour	Sammie Bellamy*	1,244	55.5	+4.0
Britain First	Ashlea Simon	405	18.1	−3.5
Conservative	Derek Barry Meades	238	10.6	−0.8
Green	Frederick Roy Battersby	162	7.2	−1.9
Liberal Democrats	Susan Vanessa Lewis	113	5.0	−1.1
Reform	Craig Birtwistle	68	3.0	N/A
Majority		839	37.4	
Turnout		2,240	23.6	
Registered electors		9,490		
Labour hold		Swing		

=== May 2022 ===
2022
Party	Candidate	Votes	%	±%
Labour	Jack Youd*	1,213	51.5	−11.0
Britain First	Ashlea Simon	508	21.6	N/A
Conservative	Adrees Masood	269	11.4	−11.6
Green	Frederick Battersby	215	9.1	−9.7
Liberal Democrats	John Grant	143	6.1	−4.9
Majority		705	29.9	
Turnout		2,357	25.15	+1.76
Registered electors		9,372		
Labour hold		Swing		

=== May 2021 ===
2021
Party	Candidate	Votes	%	±%
Labour	Adrian Brocklehurst	1,365	62.5	N/A
Labour	Sammie Bellamy	1,106	50.7	N/A
Labour	Jack Youd	875	40.1	N/A
Conservative	Craig Thompson	501	23.0	N/A
Green	Frederick Battersby	411	18.8	N/A
Conservative	Jon Carlyle	400	18.3	N/A
Liberal Democrats	Jessica Sutherland	240	11.0	N/A
Turnout		2,183	23.39	N/A
Labour win (new seat)				
Labour win (new seat)				
Labour win (new seat)				

== Elections in 2010s ==
=== May 2019 ===
2019
Party	Candidate	Votes	%	±%
Labour	Samantha Bellamy*	976		
UKIP	Bernard Gill	470		
Conservative	Ian Macdonald	296		
Green	Christopher Seed	255		
Majority		506		
Turnout		2005	21.92	
Labour hold		Swing		

=== May 2018 ===
2018
Party	Candidate	Votes	%	±%
Labour Co-op	Adrian Brocklehurst*	1,201	53.9	
Conservative	James Macdonald	421	18.9	
UKIP	Bernard Gill	148	6.6	
Green	Diana Battersby	114	5.1	
Liberal Democrats	Joseph Harmer	73	3.3	
Majority		780	35.0	
Turnout		1,961	24.48	
Labour Co-op hold		Swing		

=== May 2016 ===
2016
Party	Candidate	Votes	%	±%
Labour	Brendan Patrick Ryan*	1,146	54.1	+4.4
UKIP	Bernard Gill	526	24.8	+0.8
Conservative	Shazia Qayyum	243	11.5	−7.5
Green	Diana Joy Battersby	130	6.1	+1.9
TUSC	Terry Simmons	60	2.8	+0.2
Majority		620	29.3	+3.6
Turnout		2,118	25.2	−28.2
Labour hold		Swing		

=== May 2015 ===
2015
Party	Candidate	Votes	%	±%
Labour	Samantha Bellamy	2,263	49.7	−14.1
UKIP	Bernie Gill	1,094	24.0	+16.5
Conservative	Daniel Hill	866	19	+3.6
Green	Usama Absar Ahmed	188	4.2	N/A
TUSC	Andrew Carrs	118	2.6	N/A
Majority		1,169	25.7	−22.7
Turnout		4,550	53.4	+23.6
Labour hold		Swing		

=== May 2014 ===
2014
Party	Candidate	Votes	%	±%
Labour	Adrian Brocklehurst*	1,144	48.6	−2.3
UKIP	Bernard Gill	717	30.5	N/A
Conservative	Daniel Hill	261	11.1	−10.8
Green	Tom Dylan	116	4.9	N/A
English Democrat	Laurence Depares	84	3.6	−6.1
Independent	Paul Stephen Woodburn	31	1.3	N/A
Majority		427	18.1	−10.9
Turnout				
Labour hold		Swing	-2.3	

=== May 2012 ===
2012
Party	Candidate	Votes	%	±%
Labour	Brendan Ryan	1,183	61.4	+14.1
UKIP	Bernard Gill	329	17.1	N/A
Conservative	Ian Macdonald	232	12.0	−22.6
English Democrat	Laurence Depares	101	5.2	N/A
Liberal Democrats	Pauline Ogden	82	4.3	−13.8
Majority		854	44.3	
Turnout		1,945	22.6	−3.4
Labour hold		Swing		

=== May 2011 ===
2011
Party	Candidate	Votes	%	±%
Labour	William Pennington*	1,604	64.5	+14.9
Conservative	Chris Bates	387	15.6	−11.3
English Democrat	Laurence Depares	193	7.8	N/A
UKIP	Paul Woodburn	188	7.6	−3.6
Liberal Democrats	Pauline Ogden	116	4.7	−7.6
Majority		1,217		
Turnout		2,515	29.8	
Labour hold		Swing		

=== By-election 3 March 2011 ===
By-election 3 March 2011
Party	Candidate	Votes	%	±%
Labour	Brendan Patrick Ryan	1,291		
Conservative	Chris Bates	209		
English Democrat	Laurence Depares	125		
BNP	Keith Fairhurst	92		
Liberal Democrats	Susan Carson	62		
Majority		1,082		
Turnout		1,786	20.9	
Labour hold		Swing		

=== May 2010 ===
2010
Party	Candidate	Votes	%	±%
Labour	Adrian Brocklehurst	2,231	50.7	+3.4
Conservative	Stephen Birch	960	21.8	−12.8
Liberal Democrats	Susan Carson	764	17.4	−0.7
English Democrat	Laurence Depares	424	9.6	+9.6
Majority		1,271	28.9	+16.2
Turnout		4,398	52.1	+26.1
Labour hold		Swing		

== Elections in 2000s ==
2008
Party	Candidate	Votes	%	±%
Labour	Vincent Devine	1,033	47.3	−2.3
Conservative	Eileen MacDonald	756	34.6	+7.7
Liberal Democrats	Thomas Fernley	395	18.1	+5.8
Majority		277	12.7	
Turnout			26.0	
Labour hold		Swing		

2007
Party	Candidate	Votes	%	±%
Labour	William Pennington*	1,123	49.6	
Conservative	Judith Tope	609	26.9	
Liberal Democrats	Pauline Ogden	279	12.3	
UKIP	Bernard Gill	253	11.2	
Majority		514		
Turnout		2,264	27.3	
Labour hold		Swing		

2006
Party	Candidate	Votes	%	±%
Labour	Barbara Miller	1,062	55.2	
Conservative	Walter Edwards	542	28.2	
Liberal Democrats	Margita Shevchikova	319	16.6	
Majority		520	27.0	
Turnout		1,923	24.0	−10.2
Labour hold		Swing		

2004
Party	Candidate	Votes	%	±%
Labour	Vincent Devine	1,349		
Labour	William Pennington	1,288		
Labour	Barbara Miller	1,162		
Conservative	Walter Edwards	617		
Liberal Democrats	Daryll Toone	599		
Conservative	Eileen MacDonald	566		
Conservative	Graham Bedingham	508		
Turnout		6,089	34.2	
Labour win (new seat)				
Labour win (new seat)				
Labour win (new seat)				
