= 2012 Salford City Council election =

2012 UK local government election

Map of the results of the 2012 Salford council election. Labour in red and Conservatives in blue.

The 2012 Salford City Council election took place on 3 May 2012 to elect members of Salford City Council in England. One third of the council was up for election with councillors elected in 2008 Salford Council election defending their seats. Vote shares are calculated against the previous election to the corresponding seat. There was also an election for mayor, and other local elections on the same date.

The composition of the Council following the 2012 elections is:

Party	Seats	±
Labour	52	+8
Conservative	8	-3
Liberal Democrat	0	–3
Community Action	0	-2

== Ward results ==
Asterisks denote incumbent councillors seeking re-election. Vote share changes compared with corresponding 2008 election.

=== Barton ward ===
Barton
Party	Candidate	Votes	%	±%
Labour	John Mullen	1,347	61.2	+24.9
Independent	Josephine Crawford	475	21.5	N/A
Conservative	Abdul Mannan	282	12.8	−11.6
Liberal Democrats	Ronald Benjamin	101	4.6	−12.5
Majority		872	39.5	
Turnout		2,241	24.8	−7.3
Labour hold		Swing		

=== Boothstown and Ellenbrook ward ===
Boothstown and Ellenbrook
Party	Candidate	Votes	%	±%
Conservative	Andy Cheetham*	1,179	49.4	−18.4
Labour	Mike Pevitt	778	32.6	+16.7
UKIP	Paul Woodburn	181	7.6	N/A
Green	Tom Dylan	134	5.6	N/A
Liberal Democrats	James Gregory	115	4.8	−11.6
Majority		401	16.8	
Turnout		2,404	31.3	−4.9
Conservative hold		Swing		

=== Broughton ward ===
Broughton
Party	Candidate	Votes	%	±%
Labour	Jim King*	1,291	53.8	−4.3
UKIP	Shneur Odze	829	34.6	N/A
Conservative	Antony Yates	118	4.9	−13.9
Liberal Democrats	Bernard Carson	81	3.4	−2.8
Green	David Joseph Henry	80	3.9	N/A
Majority		462	19.3	
Turnout		2,420	27.9	+1.5
Labour hold		Swing		

=== Cadishead ward ===
Cadishead
Party	Candidate	Votes	%	±%
Labour	John Walsh	1,419	65.6	+33.5
Conservative	Marvin Herron	378	17.5	−21.4
BNP	Brenda Leather	277	12.8	N/A
Liberal Democrats	John Deas	90	4.2	−0.7
Majority		1,041	48.1	
Turnout		2,178	27.5	−9.4
Labour gain from Conservative		Swing		

=== Claremont ward ===
Claremont
Party	Candidate	Votes	%	±%
Labour	Sue Pugh	1,310	47.5	+22.8
Liberal Democrats	Norman Owen*	697	25.3	−17.5
Conservative	Chris Bates	250	9.1	−8.5
UKIP	Glyn Wright	234	8.5	+3.5
BNP	Eddy O'Sullivan	198	7.2	−2.7
Community Action	Matthew Andrews	69	2.5	N/A
Majority		613	22.2	
Turnout		2,785	34.0	−2.6
Labour gain from Liberal Democrats		Swing		

=== Eccles ward ===
Eccles
Party	Candidate	Votes	%	±%
Labour	Peter Wheeler	1,462	53.3	+15.7
Conservative	Nicholas Johnson	662	24.1	−22.6
UKIP	Alan Wright	281	10.2	N/A
Liberal Democrats	Val Kelly	212	7.7	−8.0
Independent	Kyle Wells	127	4.6	N/A
Majority		800	29.2	
Turnout		2,778	30.7	−5.6
Labour gain from Conservative		Swing		

=== Irlam ward ===
Irlam
Party	Candidate	Votes	%	±%
Labour	Tracy Kelly	1,415	75.2	+54.3
Conservative	Hilary Brunyee	343	18.2	−8.5
Liberal Democrats	Robert Boyd	124	6.6	+1.4
Majority		1,072	57.0	3115
Turnout		1,919	26.5	−11.9
Labour gain from Community Action		Swing		

=== Irwell Riverside ward ===
Irwell Riverside
Party	Candidate	Votes	%	±%
Labour	Stephen Coen*	1,208	70.3	+19.4
BNP	Gary Tumulty	202	11.8	−1.6
Liberal Democrats	Steve Middleton	158	9.2	−10.1
Conservative	David Lewis	150	8.7	−7.7
Majority		1,006	58.6	
Turnout		1,734	18.4	−2.2
Labour hold		Swing		

=== Kersal ward ===
Kersal
Party	Candidate	Votes	%	±%
Labour	Peter Connor*	1,519	67.5	+17.8
Conservative	David Wolfson	548	24.4	−13.2
Liberal Democrats	Harold Kershner	183	8.1	−4.6
Majority		971	43.2	
Turnout		2,275	26.8	−7.6
Labour hold		Swing		

=== Langworthy ward ===
Langworthy
Party	Candidate	Votes	%	±%
Labour	Paul Dennett	1,269	60.0	+21.1
Liberal Democrats	Lynn Drake*	416	19.7	−26.8
BNP	David Spencer	282	13.3	N/A
Conservative	Christopher Davies	147	7.0	−7.7
Majority		853	40.4	
Turnout		2,159	22.8	−2.1
Labour gain from Liberal Democrats		Swing		

=== Little Hulton ward ===
Little Hulton
Party	Candidate	Votes	%	±%
Labour	Pat Ryan*	1,288	75.1	+28.3
Conservative	Con Wright	272	15.9	−6.5
Liberal Democrats	David Cowpe	155	9.0	−3.3
Majority		1,016	59.2	
Turnout		1,755	19.1	−4.6
Labour hold		Swing		

=== Ordsall ward ===
Ordsall
Party	Candidate	Votes	%	±%
Labour	Ray Mashiter*	1,079	60.3	+5.4
TUSC	George Tapp	335	18.7	N/A
Conservative	Dave Morgan	225	12.6	−10.3
Liberal Democrats	Kate Middleton	151	8.4	−13.8
Majority		744	41.6	
Turnout		1,812	17.9	−5.5
Labour hold		Swing		

=== Pendlebury ward ===
Pendlebury
Party	Candidate	Votes	%	±%
Labour	Barry Warner*	1,496	58.6	+21.7
Conservative	Christine Gray	396	15.5	−15.7
BNP	Wayne Taylor	240	9.4	−3.9
Community Action	Gillian Welsh	174	6.8	N/A
Green	Stuart Cremins	129	5.1	N/A
Liberal Democrats	Christine Corry	119	4.7	−9.5
Majority		1,100	43.1	
Turnout		2,578	27.5	−2.1
Labour hold		Swing		

=== Swinton North ward ===
Swinton North
Party	Candidate	Votes	%	±%
Labour	Derek Antrobus*	1,336	50.5	+8.8
Community Action	Michael Moulding	541	20.4	N/A
Conservative	Shirley Walsh	326	12.3	−22.8
English Democrat	Paul Officer	176	6.7	N/A
Liberal Democrats	Valerie Gregory	157	5.9	−17.2
Green	Reg Howard	110	4.2	N/A
Majority		795	30.0	
Turnout		2,669	30.5	−0.8
Labour hold		Swing		

=== Swinton South ward ===
Swinton South
Party	Candidate	Votes	%	±%
Labour	Gena Merrett	1,072	45.6	+21.5
Green	Joe O'Neill	394	16.7	N/A
Conservative	Jonathon Taylor	376	16.0	−3.8
BNP	Kay Pollitt	172	7.3	N/A
Liberal Democrats	Christopher Seed	141	6.0	−37.1
English Democrat	John Mulcahy	112	4.8	N/A
Community Action	Geoff Ashall	86	3.7	N/A
Majority		678	28.8	
Turnout		2,373	28.1	−4.2
Labour hold		Swing		

=== Walkden North ward ===
Walkden North
Party	Candidate	Votes	%	±%
Labour	Brendan Ryan	1,183	61.4	+14.1
UKIP	Bernard Gill	329	17.1	N/A
Conservative	Ian Macdonald	232	12.0	−22.6
English Democrat	Laurence Depares	101	5.2	N/A
Liberal Democrats	Pauline Ogden	82	4.3	−13.8
Majority		854	44.3	
Turnout		1,945	22.6	−3.4
Labour hold		Swing		

=== Walkden South ward ===
Walkden South
Party	Candidate	Votes	%	±%
Labour	Richard Critchley	1,169	40.1	+15.1
Conservative	Anne Broomhead	1,116	38.3	−12.3
UKIP	Albert Redshaw	269	9.2	N/A
Green	Diana Battersby	159	5.5	N/A
Liberal Democrats	Susan Carson	105	3.6	−10.5
English Democrat	Paul Whitelegg	88	3.0	N/A
Majority		53	1.8	
Turnout		2,943	35.9	−4.4
Labour gain from Conservative		Swing		

=== Weaste and Seedley ward ===
Weaste and Seedley
Party	Candidate	Votes	%	±%
Labour Co-op	Thomas Murphy	1,240	54.7	+32.3
Liberal Democrats	Mary Ferrer	424	18.7	−23.4
Conservative	Adam Kennaugh	287	12.7	−3.1
BNP	Tommy Williams	197	8.7	N/A
Community Action	Jo Russell	119	5.2	N/A
Majority		816	36.0	
Turnout		2,267	25.8	−7.5
Labour Co-op gain from Liberal Democrats		Swing		

=== Winton ward ===
Winton
Party	Candidate	Votes	%	±%
Labour	David Lancaster*	1,142	50.9	+14.7
Independent	Paul Doyle	506	22.6	+4.7
Conservative	Andrew Darlington	277	12.4	−10.1
BNP	Stuart Henshaw	210	9.4	−0.1
Liberal Democrats	Melanie Owen	107	4.8	−9.2
Majority		636	28.4	
Turnout		2,255	25.5	−5.1
Labour hold		Swing		

=== Worsley ward ===
Worsley
Party	Candidate	Votes	%	±%
Conservative	Karen Garrido*	1,832	58.3	−11.2
Labour	David Hierons	770	24.5	+7.7
UKIP	Andrew Townsend	374	11.9	N/A
Liberal Democrats	Stephen Ferrer	167	5.3	−8.4
Majority		1,062	33.8	
Turnout		3,172	38.4	−3.7
Conservative hold		Swing		
