= 2007 Salford City Council election =

Council election in Salford, England

Results of the 2007 Salford City Council election

The 2007 Salford City Council election took place on 3 May 2007 to elect members of Salford City Council in England. One third of the council was up for election and the Labour party kept overall control of the council. Overall turnout was 29.36%.

After the election, the composition of the council was:

Party	Seats	±
Labour	42	0
Conservative	10	0
Liberal Democrat	8	0

== Election result ==
Salford local election result 2007
Party	Seats	Gains	Losses	Net gain/loss	Seats %	Votes %	Votes	+/−
Labour	12	1	3	-2	60	39.77	19,067	-2.90
Conservative	5	2	0	+2	25	29.54	14,163	-0.09
Liberal Democrats	3	1	1	0	15	21.87	10,484	-3.89
BNP	0	0	0	0	0	2.86	1,372	+1.94
Community Action	0	0	0	0	0	2.47	1,185	New
UKIP	0	0	0	0	0	1.48	708	New
Green	0	0	0	0	0	1.08	517	+0.59
Independent	0	0	0	0	0	0.49	234	-0.04
English Democrat	0	0	0	0	0	0.44	210	New

== Ward results ==
=== Barton ===
Barton
Party	Candidate	Votes	%	±%
Labour	Norbert Potter*	1,026	44.2	
Conservative	Abdul Mannan	498	21.4	
Liberal Democrats	Ronald Benjamin	453	19.5	
UKIP	Alan Valentine	345	14.9	
Majority		528		
Turnout		2,322	26.1	
Labour hold		Swing		

=== Boothstown and Ellenbrook ===
Boothstown and Ellenbrook
Party	Candidate	Votes	%	±%
Conservative	Robin Garrido*	1,520	58.9	
Labour	Philip Cusack	518	20.1	
Liberal Democrats	Matthew Drake	404	15.7	
Green	Roy Battersby	137	5.3	
Majority		1,002		
Turnout		2,579	34.1	
Conservative hold		Swing		

=== Broughton ===
Broughton
Party	Candidate	Votes	%	±%
Labour	Charles McIntyre	1,196	61.9	
Liberal Democrats	Bernard Carson	471	24.4	
Conservative	Colin Moore	266	13.8	
Majority		725		
Turnout		1,933	25.5	
Labour hold		Swing		

=== Cadishead ===
Cadishead
Party	Candidate	Votes	%	±%
Conservative	Elizabeth Hill	895	36.8	
Labour	Christine Hudson*	888	36.5	
Community Action	Chris Dickenson	496	20.4	
Liberal Democrats	Linda Fernley	155	6.4	
Majority		7		
Turnout		2,434	33.3	
Conservative gain from Labour		Swing		

=== Claremont ===
Claremont
Party	Candidate	Votes	%	±%
Liberal Democrats	Janice Taylor	995	37.6	
Labour	Peter Wheeler	845	31.9	
Conservative	Tim Perkins	492	18.6	
BNP	Edward O'Sullivan	316	11.9	
Majority		150		
Turnout		2,648	32.7	
Liberal Democrats hold		Swing		

=== Eccles ===
Eccles
Party	Candidate	Votes	%	±%
Conservative	Ann Davies	1,303	43.8	
Labour	Eddie Sheehy*	1,180	39.7	
Liberal Democrats	Mariska Jones	489	16.5	
Majority		123		
Turnout		2,972	35.9	
Conservative gain from Labour		Swing		

=== Irlam ===
Irlam
Party	Candidate	Votes	%	±%
Labour	Joseph Kean*	846	38.9	
Community Action	Rick Houlton	689	31.7	
Conservative	Joyce Collins	482	22.2	
Liberal Democrats	Melanie Owen	159	7.3	
Majority		157		
Turnout		2,176	30	
Labour hold		Swing		

=== Irwell Riverside ===
Irwell Riverside
Party	Candidate	Votes	%	±%
Labour	Joseph Murphy*	1,051	56.4	
Liberal Democrats	Kenneth McKelvey	399	21.4	
BNP	Anthony Healey	212	11.4	
Conservative	Nicolette Turner	202	10.8	
Majority		652		
Turnout		1,864	21.2	
Labour hold		Swing		

=== Kersal ===
Kersal
Party	Candidate	Votes	%	±%
Labour	George Wilson*	1,059	42.2	
Conservative	Shneur Odze	1,025	40.8	
Liberal Democrats	Harold Kershner	426	17.0	
Majority		34		
Turnout		2,510	31.8	
Labour hold		Swing		

=== Langworthy ===
Langworthy
Party	Candidate	Votes	%	±%
Labour	Gina Loveday*	1,038	48.1	
Liberal Democrats	Lynn Drake	830	38.5	
Conservative	Helen Vernon	288	13.4	
Majority		208		
Turnout		2,156	24.5	
Labour hold		Swing		

=== Little Hulton ===
Little Hulton
Party	Candidate	Votes	%	±%
Labour	Alice Smyth*	1,050	53.0	
Liberal Democrats	David Cowpe	337	17.0	
Conservative	Andrew Cheetham	321	16.2	
BNP	Vinnie Coleman	275	13.9	
Majority		713		
Turnout		1,983	22.4	
Labour hold		Swing		

=== Ordsall ===
Ordsall
Party	Candidate	Votes	%	±%
Labour	Peter Dobbs*	688	55.2	
Liberal Democrats	Stephen Plaister	242	19.4	
Conservative	Yan Cockayne	207	16.6	
UKIP	Duran O'Dwyer	110	8.8	
Majority		446		
Turnout		1,247	20.1	
Labour hold		Swing		

=== Pendlebury ===
Pendlebury
Party	Candidate	Votes	%	±%
Labour	Maureen Lea*	1,167	46.1	
Conservative	Peter Allcock	592	23.4	
Liberal Democrats	Katherine Ferrer	429	16.9	
BNP	Wayne Taylor	344	13.6	
Majority		575		
Turnout		2,532	28.8	
Labour hold		Swing		

=== Swinton North ===
Swinton North
Party	Candidate	Votes	%	±%
Labour	James Dawson*	1,295	50.3	
Conservative	Michael Edwards	652	25.3	
Liberal Democrats	Tamara Cooke	629	24.4	
Majority		643		
Turnout		2,576	30.5	
Labour hold		Swing		

=== Swinton South ===
Swinton South
Party	Candidate	Votes	%	±%
Liberal Democrats	Steve Cooke	1,114	41.6	
Labour	John Cullen*	750	28.0	
Conservative	Christine Allcock	372	13.9	
Independent	Dave Kelly	234	8.7	
English Democrat	Chris Roscoe	210	7.8	
Majority		364		
Turnout		2,680	32.2	
Liberal Democrats gain from Labour		Swing		

=== Walkden North ===
Walkden North
Party	Candidate	Votes	%	±%
Labour	William Pennington*	1,123	49.6	
Conservative	Judith Tope	609	26.9	
Liberal Democrats	Pauline Ogden	279	12.3	
UKIP	Bernard Gill	253	11.2	
Majority		514		
Turnout		2,264	27.3	
Labour hold		Swing		

=== Walkden South ===
Walkden South
Party	Candidate	Votes	%	±%
Conservative	Iain Lindley*	1,578	51.0	
Labour	Adrian Brocklehurst	839	27.1	
Liberal Democrats	Susan Carson	274	8.9	
BNP	Tommy Cavanagh	225	7.3	
Green	Simon Battersby	179	5.8	
Majority		739		
Turnout		3,095	38.2	
Conservative hold		Swing		

=== Weaste & Seedley ===
Weaste and Seedley
Party	Candidate	Votes	%	±%
Liberal Democrats	Geoffrey Ainsworth*	1,086	45.0	
Labour	Stephen Race	997	41.4	
Conservative	Hilary Brunyee	328	13.6	
Majority		89		
Turnout		2,411	29.5	
Liberal Democrats hold		Swing		

=== Winton ===
Winton
Party	Candidate	Votes	%	±%
Labour	Paula Boshell	941	41.4	
Liberal Democrats	John Pooley*	886	39.0	
Conservative	Gary Green	447	19.7	
Majority		55		
Turnout		2,274	26.2	
Labour gain from Liberal Democrats		Swing		

=== Worsley ===
Worsley
Party	Candidate	Votes	%	±%
Conservative	Ian MacDonald*	2,086	63.5	
Labour	Warren Coates	570	17.4	
Liberal Democrats	Christine Corry	427	13.0	
Green	Diana Battersby	201	6.1	
Majority		1,516		
Turnout		3,284	40.5	
Conservative hold		Swing		
