= 2022 Salford City Council election =

2022 local election in Salford

- 5 May 2022

20 of 60 seats on Salford City Council 31 seats needed for a majority
- Turnout: 25.20%
	First party	Second party	Third party
Leader	Paul Dennett	Les Turner
Party	Labour	Conservative	Liberal Democrats
Last election	52 seats	9 seats	1 seat
Seats won	15	2	2
Seat change	▼3	▲1	▲2
Popular vote	25,051	9,745	5,919
Percentage	53.7%	20.9%	12.7%
- Winner of each seat at the 2022 Salford City Council election
Council control before election
Labour
Subsequent council control
Labour

The 2022 Salford City Council election took place on 5 May 2022 along with other local elections across the United Kingdom. One third—20 out of 60—of councillor seats on Salford City Council were up for election.

As with the previous council election in 2021, the Labour Party maintained its longstanding control of the council; Labour lost 3 seats, bringing down its total to 49 of the council's 60 seats. The Conservatives won one additional seat and the Liberal Democrats won two seats. Average city-wide turnout was 25.20%, compared with the overall average turnout of 33.6% for England.

== Background ==
=== History ===
The Local Government Act 1972 created a two-tier system of metropolitan counties and districts covering Greater Manchester, Merseyside, South Yorkshire, Tyne and Wear, the West Midlands, and West Yorkshire starting in 1974. Salford was a district of the Greater Manchester metropolitan county. The Local Government Act 1985 abolished the metropolitan counties, with metropolitan districts taking on most of their powers as metropolitan boroughs. The Greater Manchester Combined Authority was created in 2011 and began electing the mayor of Greater Manchester from 2017, which was given strategic powers covering a region coterminous with the former Greater Manchester metropolitan county.

Since its formation, Salford City Council has continuously been under Labour control. In the most recent council election in 2021, all seats in Salford were up to election due to new boundaries. Labour won fifty-two seats, the Conservatives won seven and the Liberal Democrats won one.

As the Local Government Boundary Commission for England produced new boundaries for Manchester ahead of the 2021 election, meaning that the 2021 elections were all-out, with all councillors being elected before returning to electing by thirds, candidates up for re-election in 2022 are those who came third in each ward in 2021.

== Electoral process ==
The council elects its councillors in thirds, with a third being up for election every year for three years, with no election in the fourth year. The election will take place by first-past-the-post voting, with wards generally being represented by three councillors, with one elected in each election year to serve a four-year term.

All registered electors (British, Irish, Commonwealth and European Union citizens) living in Salford aged 18 or over will be entitled to vote in the election. People who live at two addresses in different councils, such as university students with different term-time and holiday addresses, are entitled to be registered for and vote in elections in both local authorities. Voting in-person at polling stations will take place from 07:00 to 22:00 on election day, and voters will be able to apply for postal votes or proxy votes in advance of the election.

== Results ==
Statements of persons nominated were published on 6 April.

2022 Salford City Council election
Party	This election				Full council			This election		
Party	Candidates	Seats	Net	Seats %	Other	Total	Total %	Votes	Votes %	+/−
Labour	{{{candidates}}}	15/20	▼3	75.0	34	49	81.7	25,051	53.7	-3.7
Conservative	{{{candidates}}}	2/16	▲1	10.0	6	8	13.3	9,745	20.9	-4.8
Liberal Democrats	{{{candidates}}}	2/20	▲1	10.0	0	2	3.3	5,919	12.7	+6.4
Independent	{{{candidates}}}	1/5	▲1	5.0	0	1	1.7	2,010	4.3	+2.5
Green	{{{candidates}}}	0/13	0	0.0	0	0	0.0	3,038	6.5	±0.0
Britain First	{{{candidates}}}	0/1	0	0.0	0	0	0.0	508	1.1	N/A
Women's Equality	{{{candidates}}}	0/1	0	0.0	0	0	0.0	265	0.6	+0.3
TUSC	{{{candidates}}}	0/1	0	0.0	0	0	0.0	99	0.2	+0.1

Incumbent councillors who stood for re-election are marked below with an asterisk (*).

=== Barton & Winton ===
Barton and Winton (1 seat)
Party	Candidate	Votes	%	±%
Labour	John Mullen*	1,772	71.8	+23.1
Conservative	Michael Richman	489	19.8	+1.3
Liberal Democrats	Antony Duke	188	7.6	−0.8
Majority		1,283	52.0	
Turnout		2,467	23.3	−2.1
Registered electors		10,613		
Labour hold		Swing		

=== Blackfriars & Trinity ===
Blackfriars and Trinity (1 seat)
Party	Candidate	Votes	%	±%
Labour	Roseanna Wain*	998	65.4	+2.3
Green	David Jones	299	19.6	−11.6
Liberal Democrats	Joe Allen	204	13.4	+6.1
Majority		699	45.8	
Turnout		1,526	19.6	−6.9
Registered electors		7,804		
Labour hold		Swing		

=== Boothstown & Ellenbrook ===
Boothstown and Ellenbrook (1 seat)
Party	Candidate	Votes	%	±%
Conservative	Les Turner*	1,777	48.4	−8.6
Labour	Mohammed Bashir	1,143	31.4	−1.1
Liberal Democrats	Ian Chisnall	383	10.5	+1.4
Green	Diana Battersby	320	8.8	−4.1
Majority		634	17	
Turnout		3,638	37.4	−2.5
Registered electors		9,726		
Conservative hold		Swing		

=== Broughton ===
Broughton (1 seat)
Party	Candidate	Votes	%	±%
Labour	John Merry*	1,284	64.0	+8.8
Conservative	Patience Assam	227	11.3	−8.2
Liberal Democrats	Alexander Wynne	185	9.2	+2.3
Green	David Joseph Henry	172	8.6	−8.0
Independent	Eli Leech	130	6.5	N/A
Majority		1,057	52.7	
Turnout		2,007	20.7	−2.6
Registered electors		9,704		
Labour hold		Swing		

=== Cadishead & Lower Irlam ===
Cadishead and Lower Irlam (1 seat)
Party	Candidate	Votes	%	±%
Labour	Yolande Amana-Ghola	1,274	59.7	−3.3
Conservative	Amar Farooq	433	20.3	1.8
Liberal Democrats	Jamie Clark	393	18.4	N/A
Majority		841	39.4	
Turnout		2,134	22.6	−8.0
Registered electors		9,459		
Labour hold		Swing		

=== Claremont ===
Claremont (1 seat)
Party	Candidate	Votes	%	±%
Labour	Neil Reynolds*	1,599	57.6	+3.3
Conservative	Bernard Goldfine	391	14.1	−1.7
Independent	Mary Ferrar	315	11.3	−2.3
Green	Christopher Seed	269	9.7	−6.0
Liberal Democrats	Gizella Hughes	186	6.7	−8.5
Majority		1,208	43.5	
Turnout		2,776	28.3	−4.0
Registered electors		9,814		
Labour hold		Swing		

=== Eccles ===
Eccles (1 seat)
Party	Candidate	Votes	%	±%
Labour	Nathaniel Tetteh*	1,964	59.9	+1.2
Conservative	Chris Bates	731	22.3	−0.2
Green	Clive Hamilton	265	8.1	−13.9
Liberal Democrats	Oliver Bradfield	205	6.3	−4.1
TUSC	Sally Griffiths	99	3.0	−1.8
Majority		1,233	37.6	
Turnout		3,279	29.87	−3.29
Registered electors		10,978		
Labour hold		Swing		

=== Higher Irlam & Peel Green ===
Higher Irlam and Peel Green (1 seat)
Party	Candidate	Votes	%	±%
Labour	Mishal Saeed	1,317	63.2	+10.8
Conservative	Saqib Aftab	381	18.3	−5.5
Liberal Democrats	Kenneth Thompson	364	17.5	N/A
Majority		936	44.9	
Turnout		2084	21.41	−4.45
Registered electors		9,733		
Labour hold		Swing		

=== Kersal & Broughton Park ===
Kersal & Broughton Park (1 seat)
Party	Candidate	Votes	%	±%
Independent	Avrohom Walter*	1,009	38.2	+8.7
Conservative	Adam Carney	791	30.0	−29.5
Labour	Chioma Mgbeokwere	696	26.4	+2.5
Liberal Democrats	James Twells	134	5.1	−24.4
Majority		218	8.25	
Turnout		2,641	27.94	−3.94
Registered electors		9,451		
Independent gain from Liberal Democrats		Swing		

*prior to the election the incumbent Councillor, Avrohom Walter, had initially been elected as a Liberal Democrat in 2021, but left the Liberal Democrats to stand as an independent candidate in this election.

=== Little Hulton ===
Little Hulton (1 seat)
Party	Candidate	Votes	%	±%
Labour	Teresa Pepper	1,066	63.7	+1.4
Conservative	Dorothy Chapman	395	23.6	−0.9
Green	Stuart Oxbrow	113	6.8	−11.0
Liberal Democrats	Stuart Robbins	88	5.3	N/A
Majority		671	40.1	
Turnout		1,674	18.10	−1.42
Registered electors		9,248		
Labour hold		Swing		

=== Ordsall ===
Ordsall (1 seat)
Party	Candidate	Votes	%	±%
Liberal Democrats	Chris Twells	840	45.7	+36.3
Labour	John Walsh*	748	40.7	−30.8
Green	Nicola Smith	234	12.7	−12.8
Majority		92	5.0	
Turnout		1,837	23.08	−1.62
Registered electors		7,958		
Liberal Democrats gain from Labour		Swing		

=== Pendlebury & Clifton ===
Pendlebury & Clifton (1 seat)
Party	Candidate	Votes	%	±%
Labour	Sophia Linden*	1,309	61.9	+13.0
Conservative	Jackie Mountaine	550	26.0	+3.1
Liberal Democrats	Ian McKinlay	236	11.2	+3.5
Majority		759	35.9	
Turnout		2,115	23.29	−4.08
Registered electors		9,081		
Labour hold		Swing		

=== Pendleton & Charlestown ===
Pendleton & Charlestown (1 seat)
Party	Candidate	Votes	%	±%
Labour	John Warmisham*	1,154	66.4	+4.1
Conservative	Miranda Friedman	266	15.3	−0.7
Green	Andrew Nadin	183	10.5	−10.4
Liberal Democrats	Sam Wade	119	6.9	−5.4
Majority		888	51.1	
Turnout		1,737	19.36	−2.27
Registered electors		8,972		
Labour hold		Swing		

=== Quays ===
Quays (1 seat)
Party	Candidate	Votes	%	±%
Liberal Democrats	Alex Warren	976	60.1	+28.7
Labour	Phil Tresadern*	503	31.0	−25.7
Green	Lucy Staniforth	135	8.3	−13.9
Majority		473	29.1	
Turnout		1,624	24.00	−3.39
Registered electors		6,766		
Liberal Democrats gain from Labour		Swing		

=== Swinton & Wardley ===
Swinton & Wardley (1 seat)
Party	Candidate	Votes	%	±%
Labour	Gina Reynolds*	1,600	61.2	+1.4
Conservative	Alima Husain	423	16.2	−8.9
Independent	Mark Sampson	319	12.2	N/A
Green	Liam Waite	155	5.9	N/A
Liberal Democrats	Gareth Watkins	107	4.1	−6.5
Majority		1,177	45.0	
Turnout		2,614	28.15	−1.83
Registered electors		9,286		
Labour hold		Swing		

=== Swinton Park ===
Swinton Park (1 seat)
Party	Candidate	Votes	%	±%
Labour	Stuart Dickman*	1,530	57.3	+8.1
Conservative	Derek Meades	497	18.6	−3.2
Independent	Joe O’Neill	237	8.9	−6.7
Liberal Democrats	John McLellan	210	7.9	+0.8
Green	Howard Balkind	184	6.9	−7.3
Majority		1,033	38.7	
Turnout		2,671	28.38	−2.24
Registered electors		9,413		
Labour hold		Swing		

=== Walkden North ===
Walkden North (1 seat)
Party	Candidate	Votes	%	±%
Labour	Jack Youd*	1,213	51.5	−11.0
Britain First	Ashlea Simon	508	21.6	N/A
Conservative	Adrees Masood	269	11.4	−11.6
Green	Frederick Battersby	215	9.1	−9.7
Liberal Democrats	John Grant	143	6.1	−4.9
Majority		705	29.9	
Turnout		2,357	25.15	+1.76
Registered electors		9,372		
Labour hold		Swing		

=== Walkden South ===
Walkden South (1 seat)
Party	Candidate	Votes	%	±%
Labour	Irfan Syed*	1,281	46.8	−7.1
Conservative	Azmat Husain	674	24.6	−8.9
Green	Thomas Dylan	494	18.0	+2.2
Liberal Democrats	Patricia Murphy	271	9.9	+1.7
Majority		607	22.2	
Turnout		2,739	30.61	−4.86
Registered electors		8,948		
Labour hold		Swing		

=== Weaste & Seedley ===
Weaste & Seedley (1 seat)
Party	Candidate	Votes	%	±%
Labour	Alexis Shama*	1,302	63.7	−1.5
Liberal Democrats	Paul Heilbron	436	21.3	+6.4
Women's Equality	Donna-Maree Humphery	265	13.0	N/A
Majority		866	42.3	
Turnout		2045	18.99	−5.45
Registered electors		10,767		
Labour hold		Swing		

=== Worsley & Westwood Park ===
Worsley & Westwood Park (1 seat)
Party	Candidate	Votes	%	±%
Conservative	Adam Kealey	1,451	48.0	+2.2
Labour	Tony Davies*	1,298	43.0	+4.2
Liberal Democrats	James Blessing	251	8.3	−0.4
Majority		153	5.1	
Turnout		3,020	33.86	−1.19
Registered electors		8,920		
Conservative gain from Labour		Swing		
