= Barton and Winton =

Electoral ward of Salford, England

- Electoral ward
- Country: United Kingdom
- Constituent country: England
- Region: North West England
- County: Greater Manchester
- Metropolitan borough: Salford
- Created: May 2021
- Named for: Barton upon Irwell and Winton

Government UK Parliament constituency: Worsley and Eccles
  - Type: Unicameral
  - Body: Salford City Council
  - Mayor of Salford: Paul Dennett (Labour)
  - Councillor: Jacqui Fahy (Labour)
  - Councillor: John Mullen (Labour)

Barton and Winton is an electoral ward of Salford, England created by the Local Government Boundary Commission for England (LGBCE) replacing the previous electoral wards of Barton and Winton.

It is represented in Westminster by Michael Wheeler MP for Worsley and Eccles. The first councillors for the ward were elected at the 2021 local elections.

== Councillors ==
The ward is represented by three councillors, each elected for a four-year term.

The current councillors for the ward are Paula Boshell (Lab), David Lancaster (Lab), and John Mullen (Lab).

| Election | Councillor | Councillor | Councillor |
|---|---|---|---|
| 2021 | Paula Boshell (Lab) | David Lancaster (Lab) | John Mullen (Lab) |

indicates seat up for re-election.

== Elections in 2020s ==
(*) denotes incumbent councillor seeking re-election.

=== May 2022 ===
2022 Salford City Council election
| Party | Candidate | Votes | % | ±% |
|---|---|---|---|---|
| Labour | John Mullen* | 1,772 | 71.8 | +23.1 |
| Conservative | Michael Richman | 489 | 19.8 | +1.3 |
| Liberal Democrats | Antony Duke | 188 | 7.6 | −0.8 |
| Majority | | 1,283 | 52.0 | |
| Turnout | | 2,467 | 23.3 | −2.1 |
| Registered electors | | 10,613 | | |
| Labour hold | | Swing | | |

=== May 2021 ===
2021 Salford City Council election
| Party | Candidate | Votes | % | ±% |
|---|---|---|---|---|
| Labour | Paula Boshell | 1,642 | 61.3 | N/A |
| Labour | David Lancaster | 1,410 | 52.6 | N/A |
| Labour | John Mullen | 1,305 | 48.7 | N/A |
| Conservative | Jacob Barden | 496 | 18.5 | N/A |
| Conservative | Janet Reygan | 425 | 15.9 | N/A |
| Green | Jenna Sayer | 417 | 15.6 | N/A |
| Conservative | Tracey Roberts | 404 | 15.1 | N/A |
| Liberal Democrats | Antony Duke | 225 | 8.4 | N/A |
| Turnout | | 2,679 | 25.35 | N/A |
| Labour win (new seat) | | | | |
| Labour win (new seat) | | | | |
| Labour win (new seat) | | | | |
