= 2008 Salford City Council election =

2008 UK local government election

Results of the 2008 Salford City Council election

The 2008 Salford City Council election took place on 1 May 2008 to elect members of Salford City Council in England. One third of the council was up for election. The Labour Party lost six seats but stayed in overall control of the council. Overall turnout was 31.3%.

The composition of the Council following the 2008 elections:

Party	Seats	±
Labour	36	-6
Conservative	13	+3
Liberal Democrat	10	+2
Community Action	1	+1

== Election result ==
Salford local election result 2008
Party	Seats	Gains	Losses	Net gain/loss	Seats %	Votes %	Votes	+/−
Labour	10	0	6	-6	50.0	34.8	17,899	-4.7
Conservative	5	3	0	+3	25.0	34.0	17,472	+4.6
Liberal Democrats	4	2	0	+2	20.0	21.3	10,949	-0.4
Community Action	1	1	0	+1	5.0	3.5	1,805	
BNP	0	0	0	0	0.0	3.6	1,871	
Independent	0	0	0	0	0.0	2.4	1,238	
UKIP	0	0	0	0	0.0	0.3	149	

== Ward results ==
=== Barton ward ===
Barton
Party	Candidate	Votes	%	±%
Labour	John Mullen	1,039	41.0	−3.2
Conservative	Abdul Mannan	701	27.7	+6.2
Liberal Democrats	Ronald Benjamin	489	19.3	−0.2
Independent	Alan Valentine	303	12.0	−2.9
Majority		338	13.3	
Turnout			28.4	
Labour hold		Swing		

=== Boothstown And Ellenbrook ward ===
Boothstown and Ellenbrook
Party	Candidate	Votes	%	±%
Conservative	Andrew Cheetham	1,867	67.7	+8.8
Liberal Democrats	Catherine Connett	452	16.4	+0.7
Labour	Abdul Shahid	437	15.9	−4.2
Majority		1,415	51.3	
Turnout			36.2	
Conservative hold		Swing		

=== Broughton ward ===
Broughton
Party	Candidate	Votes	%	±%
Labour Co-op	Jim King	1,185	58.1	−3.8
Liberal Democrats	Bernard Carson	472	23.1	−1.2
Conservative	David Wolfson	383	18.8	+5.0
Majority		713	35.0	
Turnout			26.4	
Labour Co-op hold		Swing		

=== Cadishead ward ===
Cadishead
Party	Candidate	Votes	%	±%
Conservative	Lyn Bramer-Kelly	1,047	38.9	+2.0
Labour	Jimmy Hunt	865	32.1	−4.4
Community Action	Chris Dickenson	653	24.2	+3.9
Liberal Democrats	Melanie Owen	130	4.8	−1.6
Majority		182	6.8	
Turnout			36.9	
Conservative gain from Labour		Swing		

=== Claremont ward ===
Claremont
Party	Candidate	Votes	%	±%
Liberal Democrats	Norman Owen	1,277	42.8	+5.2
Labour	Peter Wheeler	737	24.7	−7.2
Conservative	Chris Allcock	525	17.6	−1.0
BNP	Edward O’Sullivan	295	9.9	−2.0
UKIP	Robert Wakefield	149	5.0	N/A
Majority		540	18.1	
Turnout			36.2	
Liberal Democrats hold		Swing		

=== Eccles ward ===
Eccles
Party	Candidate	Votes	%	±%
Conservative	Judith Tope	1,422	46.7	+2.9
Labour	Alan Broughton	1,144	37.6	−2.1
Liberal Democrats	Stephen Ferrer	479	15.7	−0.7
Majority		278	9.1	
Turnout			36.2	
Conservative gain from Labour		Swing		

=== Irlam ward ===
Irlam
Party	Candidate	Votes	%	±%
Community Action	Rick Houlton	1,152	41.2	+9.6
Conservative	Stephen Fitzsimmons	832	29.8	+7.6
Labour	Roger Jones	650	23.3	−15.6
Liberal Democrats	Mariska Jones	161	5.8	−1.6
Majority		320	11.4	
Turnout			38.4	
Community Action gain from Labour		Swing		

=== Irwell Riverside ward ===
Irwell Riverside
Party	Candidate	Votes	%	±%
Labour	Stephen Coen	888	50.9	−5.5
Liberal Democrats	Kenneth Mckelvey	337	19.3	−2.1
Conservative	David Lewis	286	16.4	+5.6
BNP	Anthony Healey	233	13.4	+2.0
Majority		551	31.6	
Turnout			20.6	
Labour hold		Swing		

=== Kersal ward ===
Kersal
Party	Candidate	Votes	%	±%
Labour	Peter Connor	1,385	49.7	+7.5
Conservative	Shneur Odze	1,046	37.5	−3.3
Liberal Democrats	Harold Kershner	356	12.8	−4.2
Majority		339	12.2	
Turnout			34.4	
Labour hold		Swing		

=== Langworthy ward ===
Langworthy
Party	Candidate	Votes	%	±%
Liberal Democrats	Lynn Drake	1,049	46.5	+8.0
Labour	Andy Salmon	878	38.9	−9.2
Conservative	Helen Vernon	330	14.6	+1.3
Majority		171	7.6	
Turnout			24.9	
Liberal Democrats gain from Labour		Swing		

=== Little Hulton ward ===
Little Hulton
Party	Candidate	Votes	%	±%
Labour	Pat Ryan	1,021	46.8	−6.2
Conservative	Elaine West	488	22.4	+6.2
BNP	Vinnie Coleman	404	18.5	+4.6
Liberal Democrats	Susan Carson	270	12.4	−4.6
Majority		533	24.4	
Turnout			23.7	
Labour hold		Swing		

=== Ordsall ward ===
Ordsall
Party	Candidate	Votes	%	±%
Labour	Ray Mashiter	860	54.9	−0.3
Conservative	Yan Cockayne	358	22.9	+6.3
Liberal Democrats	Liam Starkey	348	22.2	+2.8
Majority		502	32.0	
Turnout			23.4	
Labour hold		Swing		

=== Pendlebury ward ===
Pendlebury
Party	Candidate	Votes	%	±%
Labour	Barry Warner	975	36.9	−9.2
Conservative	Peter Allcock	826	31.2	+7.9
Liberal Democrats	Christine Corry	375	14.2	−2.8
BNP	Wayne Taylor	352	13.3	−0.3
Independent	Stuart Cremins	117	4.4	(+4.4)
Majority		149	5.7	
Turnout			29.6	
Labour hold		Swing		

=== Swinton North ward ===
Swinton North
Party	Candidate	Votes	%	±%
Labour	Derek Antrobus	1,122	41.7	−8.6
Conservative	Shirley Walsh	947	35.2	+9.9
Liberal Democrats	Tamara Cooke	624	23.2	−1.3
Majority		175	6.5	
Turnout			31.3	
Labour hold		Swing		

=== Swinton South ward ===
Swinton South
Party	Candidate	Votes	%	±%
Liberal Democrats	Martin O’Neill	1,150	43.1	+1.6
Labour	Valerie Burgoyne	642	24.1	−3.9
Conservative	Hilary Brunyee	527	19.8	+5.9
Independent	Dave Kelly	347	13.0	+4.3
Majority		508	19.0	
Turnout			32.3	
Liberal Democrats gain from Labour		Swing		

=== Walkden North ward ===
Walkden North
Party	Candidate	Votes	%	±%
Labour	Vincent Devine	1,033	47.3	−2.3
Conservative	Eileen MacDonald	756	34.6	+7.7
Liberal Democrats	Thomas Fernley	395	18.1	+5.8
Majority		277	12.7	
Turnout			26.0	
Labour hold		Swing		

=== Walkden South ward ===
Walkden South
Party	Candidate	Votes	%	±%
Conservative	Nicky Turner	1,649	50.6	−0.4
Labour	Brendan Ryan	815	25.0	−2.1
Liberal Democrats	Pauline Ogden	458	14.1	+5.2
BNP	Tommy Cavanagh	336	10.3	+3.0
Majority		834	25.6	
Turnout			40.3	
Conservative gain from Labour		Swing		

=== Weaste & Seedley ward ===
Weaste and Seedley
Party	Candidate	Votes	%	±%
Liberal Democrats	Janice Heywood	1,282	52.5	+7.5
Labour Co-op	Tony Harold	682	27.9	−13.4
Conservative	Heather Grant	478	19.6	+6.0
Majority		600	24.6	
Turnout			29.4	
Liberal Democrats hold		Swing		

=== Winton ward ===
Winton
Party	Candidate	Votes	%	±%
Labour	David Lancaster	959	36.3	−5.1
Conservative	Gary Green	593	22.4	+2.8
Independent	Paul Doyle	471	17.8	+17.8
Liberal Democrats	Stephen Plaister	369	14.0	−25.0
BNP	Thomas Williams	251	9.5	+9.5
Majority		366	13.9	
Turnout			30.6	
Labour hold		Swing		

=== Worsley ward ===
Worsley
Party	Candidate	Votes	%	±%
Conservative	Karen Garrido	2,411	69.5	+6.0
Labour	John Ferguson	582	16.8	−0.6
Liberal Democrats	Sheila Mulleady	476	13.7	+0.7
Majority		1,829	52.7	
Turnout			42.1	
Conservative hold		Swing		
