= Blackfriars and Trinity =

Electoral ward of Salford, England

- Electoral ward
- Country: United Kingdom
- Constituent country: England
- Region: North West England
- County: Greater Manchester
- Metropolitan borough: Salford
- Created: May 2021
- Named for: Blackfriars

Government
  - Type: Unicameral
  - Body: Salford City Council
  - Mayor of Salford: Paul Dennett (Labour)
  - Councillor: Jane Hamilton (Labour)
  - Councillor: Stephen Coen (Labour)
  - Councillor: Roseanna Wain (Labour)

Blackfriars and Trinity is an electoral ward of Salford, England created by the Local Government Boundary Commission for England (LGBCE).

The first councillors for the ward were elected at the 2021 local elections.

== Councillors ==
The ward is represented by three councillors, each elected for a four-year term.

The current councillors for the ward are Jane Hamilton (Lab), Stephen Coen (Lab), and Roseanna Wain (Lab).

Election	Councillor	Councillor	Councillor
May 2021	Jane Hamilton (Lab)	Stephen Coen (Lab)	Raymond Walker (Lab)
Nov 2021	Jane Hamilton (Lab)	Stephen Coen (Lab)	Roseanna Wain (Lab)

indicates seat up for re-election. indicates seat won in by-election.

== Elections in 2020s ==
(*) denotes incumbent councillor seeking re-election.

=== May 2022 ===
2022 Salford City Council election
Party	Candidate	Votes	%	±%
Labour	Roseanna Wain*	998	65.4	+2.3
Green	David Jones	299	19.6	−11.6
Liberal Democrats	Joe Allen	204	13.4	+6.1
Majority		699	45.8	
Turnout		1,526	19.6	−6.9
Registered electors		7,804		
Labour hold		Swing		

=== November 2021 ===
November 2021 by-election
Party	Candidate	Votes	%	±%
Labour	Roseanna Wain	408	51.8	−2.3
Green	David Jones	160	20.3	−6.4
Liberal Democrats	Joseph Allen	152	19.3	+13.0
Conservative	Christopher Bates	68	8.6	+0.8
Majority		248	31.5	
Turnout		788	10.1	
Labour hold		Swing	▲2.1	

=== May 2021 ===
2021 Salford City Council election
Party	Candidate	Votes	%	±%
Labour	Jane Hamilton	1,226	63.1	N/A
Labour	Stephen Coen	1,205	62.0	N/A
Labour	Raymond Walker	946	48.7	N/A
Green	Wendy Olsen	606	31.2	N/A
Green	Christopher Seed	349	18.0	N/A
Green	Michael Wharton	276	14.2	N/A
Conservative	Patience Assam	177	9.1	N/A
Liberal Democrats	Bernard Treves Brown	142	7.3	N/A
Conservative	Shahzadi Begum	137	7.1	N/A
Independent	Zak D’Amelio	118	6.1	N/A
Liberal Democrats	Steve Gillan	96	4.9	N/A
Liberal Democrats	Scott Turner-Preece	61	3.1	N/A
Turnout		1,942	26.48	N/A
Labour win (new seat)				
Labour win (new seat)				
Labour win (new seat)				
