= Irlam (ward) =

Former electoral ward of Salford, England

- Electoral ward
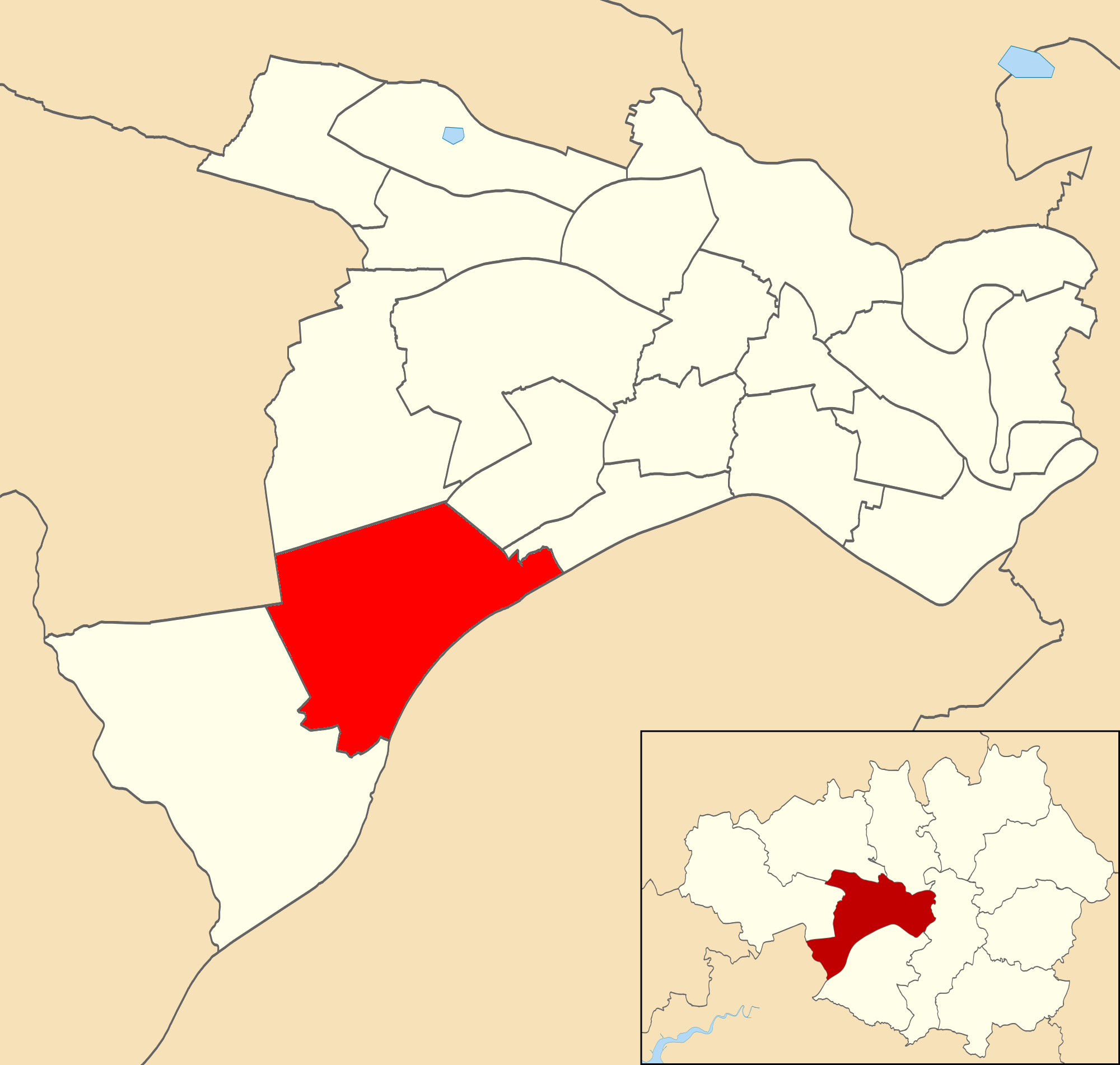
- Irlam ward within Salford City Council.

- Coat of arms
- Motto: Let the good (or safety) of the people be the supreme (or highest) law
- Interactive map of Irlam
- Coordinates: 53.4637°N 2.4095°W
- Country: United Kingdom
- Constituent country: England
- Region: North West England
- County: Greater Manchester
- Metropolitan borough: Salford
- Created: May 2004
- Named after: Irlam

Government UK Parliament constituency: Worsley and Eccles South
  - Type: Unicameral
  - Body: Salford City Council
  - Mayor of Salford: Paul Dennett (Labour)
  - Councillor: Roger Jones (Lab Co-op)
  - Councillor: Darren Goulden (Ind)
  - Councillor: Tracy Kelly (Lab)

Population
  - Total: 9,857
- Ward profile conducted by Salford City Council in 2014

Irlam was an electoral ward of Salford, England. It was represented in Westminster by the constituency of Worsley and Eccles South. A profile of the ward conducted by Salford City Council in 2014 recorded a population of 9,857.

== Councillors ==
Between 2004 and 2021 the ward was represented by three councillors, each being elected for a term of four years.

Election	Councillor	Councillor	Councillor
2004	Roger Lightup (Lab)	Joseph Kean (Lab)	John Jones (Lab)
2006	Roger Lightup (Lab)	Joseph Kean (Lab)	John Jones (Lab)
2007	Roger Lightup (Lab)	Joseph Kean (Lab)	John Jones (Lab)
2008	Roger Lightup (Lab)	Joseph Kean (Lab)	Rick Houlton (Community Action)
2010	Roger Jones (Lab Co-op)	Joseph Kean (Lab)	Rick Houlton (Community Action)
2011	Roger Jones (Lab Co-op)	Joseph Kean (Lab)	Rick Houlton (Community Action)
2012	Roger Jones (Lab Co-op)	Joseph Kean (Lab)	Tracy Kelly (Lab)
2014	Roger Jones (Lab Co-op)	Joseph Kean (Lab)	Tracy Kelly (Lab)
2015	Roger Jones (Lab Co-op)	Peter Taylor (Lab)	Tracy Kelly (Lab)
2016	Roger Jones (Lab Co-op)	Peter Taylor (Lab)	Tracy Kelly (Lab)
2018	Roger Jones (Lab Co-op)	Peter Taylor (Lab)	Tracy Kelly (Lab)
2019	Roger Jones (Lab Co-op)	Darren Goulden (Ind)	Tracy Kelly (Lab)
2021	Ward abolished		

indicates seat up for re-election.

The ward was abolished at the 2021 Salford City Council election, and was replaced by two new wards: Cadishead and Lower Irlam and Higher Irlam and Peel Green.

== Elections in 2010s ==
=== May 2019 ===
2019
Party	Candidate	Votes	%	±%
Independent	Darren John Goulden	856	39.8	
Labour	Peter Taylor*	731	34.0	
UKIP	Brian Norman Robinson	281	13.1	
Conservative	Myrella Saunders	173	8.1	
Green	Daniel Towers	108	5.0	
Majority		125		
Turnout		2,148	30.07	
Independent gain from Labour		Swing		

=== May 2018 ===
2018
Party	Candidate	Votes	%	±%
Labour Co-op	Roger Jones*	936	44.4	
Independent	Darren Goulden	769	36.4	
Conservative	James Mount	357	16.9	
Liberal Democrats	James Blessing	48	2.3	
Majority		167	7.9	
Turnout		2,116	30.28	
Labour Co-op hold		Swing		

=== May 2016 ===
2016
Party	Candidate	Votes	%	±%
Labour	Tracy Jane Kelly*	1,118	58.3	+8.3
UKIP	Brian Norman Robinson	435	22.7	−0.8
Conservative	Noel Gaskell	248	12.9	−5.9
Green	Barry Woodling	58	3.0	−2.6
TUSC	Michelle Joy O'Mahoney	43	2.2	+1.0
Majority		683	35.6	+4.4
Turnout		1,917	27.8	−27.4
Labour hold		Swing		

=== May 2015 ===
2015
Party	Candidate	Votes	%	±%
Labour	Peter Taylor	1,935	50.0	−6.4
UKIP	Brian Norman Robinson	910	23.5	N/A
Conservative	Noel Gaskell	727	18.8	0.0
Green	Paul Scott Hardwick	215	5.6	N/A
TUSC	Eric Thorpe	47	1.2	N/A
Independent	Jackie Anderson	25	0.6	N/A
Majority		1,208	31.2	−6.4
Turnout		3,871	55.2	
Labour hold		Swing		

=== May 2014 ===
2014
Party	Candidate	Votes	%	±%
Labour Co-op	Roger Jones	1,177	56.4	
Conservative	Noel Gaskell	393	18.8	
Reality	Jackie Anderson	370	17.7	
Independent	Glenn Croston	147	7.0	
Majority		784	37.6	
Turnout		2,087		
Labour Co-op hold		Swing		

=== May 2012 ===
2012
Party	Candidate	Votes	%	±%
Labour	Tracy Kelly	1,415	75.2	+54.3
Conservative	Hilary Brunyee	343	18.2	−8.5
Liberal Democrats	Robert Boyd	124	6.6	+1.4
Majority		1,072	57.0	3115
Turnout		1,919	26.5	−11.9
Labour gain from Community Action		Swing		

=== May 2011 ===
2011
Party	Candidate	Votes	%	±%
Labour	Joseph Kean*	1,658	67.6	+28.7
Conservative	Mandy Unwin	484	19.7	−2.5
Green	Jackie Anderson	215	8.8	N/A
Liberal Democrats	Melanie Owen	94	3.8	−3.5
Majority		1,174		
Turnout		2,461	34.2	
Labour hold		Swing		

=== May 2010 ===
2010
Party	Candidate	Votes	%	±%
Labour Co-op	Roger Jones	1,791	44.0	+20.7
Conservative	Chris Bates	1,095	26.9	−2.9
Liberal Democrats	Katriona Middleton	663	16.3	+10.5
Independent	Mark Armstrong	500	12.3	+12.3
Majority		696	17.1	+5.7
Turnout		4,069	56.4	+18.0
Labour hold		Swing		

== Elections in 2000s ==
2008
Party	Candidate	Votes	%	±%
Community Action	Rick Houlton	1,152	41.2	+9.6
Conservative	Stephen Fitzsimmons	832	29.8	+7.6
Labour	Roger Jones	650	23.3	−15.6
Liberal Democrats	Mariska Jones	161	5.8	−1.6
Majority		320	11.4	
Turnout			38.4	
Community Action gain from Labour		Swing		

2007
Party	Candidate	Votes	%	±%
Labour	Joseph Kean*	846	38.9	
Community Action	Rick Houlton	689	31.7	
Conservative	Joyce Collins	482	22.2	
Liberal Democrats	Melanie Owen	159	7.3	
Majority		157		
Turnout		2,176	30	
Labour hold		Swing		

2006
Party	Candidate	Votes	%	±%
Labour	Roger Lightup	905	49.6	
Conservative	Joyce Collins	585	32.1	
Liberal Democrats	Mariska Jones	334	18.3	
Majority		320	17.5	
Turnout		1,824	25.9	−6.2
Labour hold		Swing		

2004
Party	Candidate	Votes	%	±%
Labour	John Jones	1,073		
Labour	Joseph Kean	922		
Labour	Roger Lightup	842		
Conservative	Joyce Collins	679		
Liberal Democrats	Christine Race	606		
Turnout		4,122	32.1	
Labour win (new seat)				
Labour win (new seat)				
Labour win (new seat)				
