= Eccles (ward) =

- Electoral ward
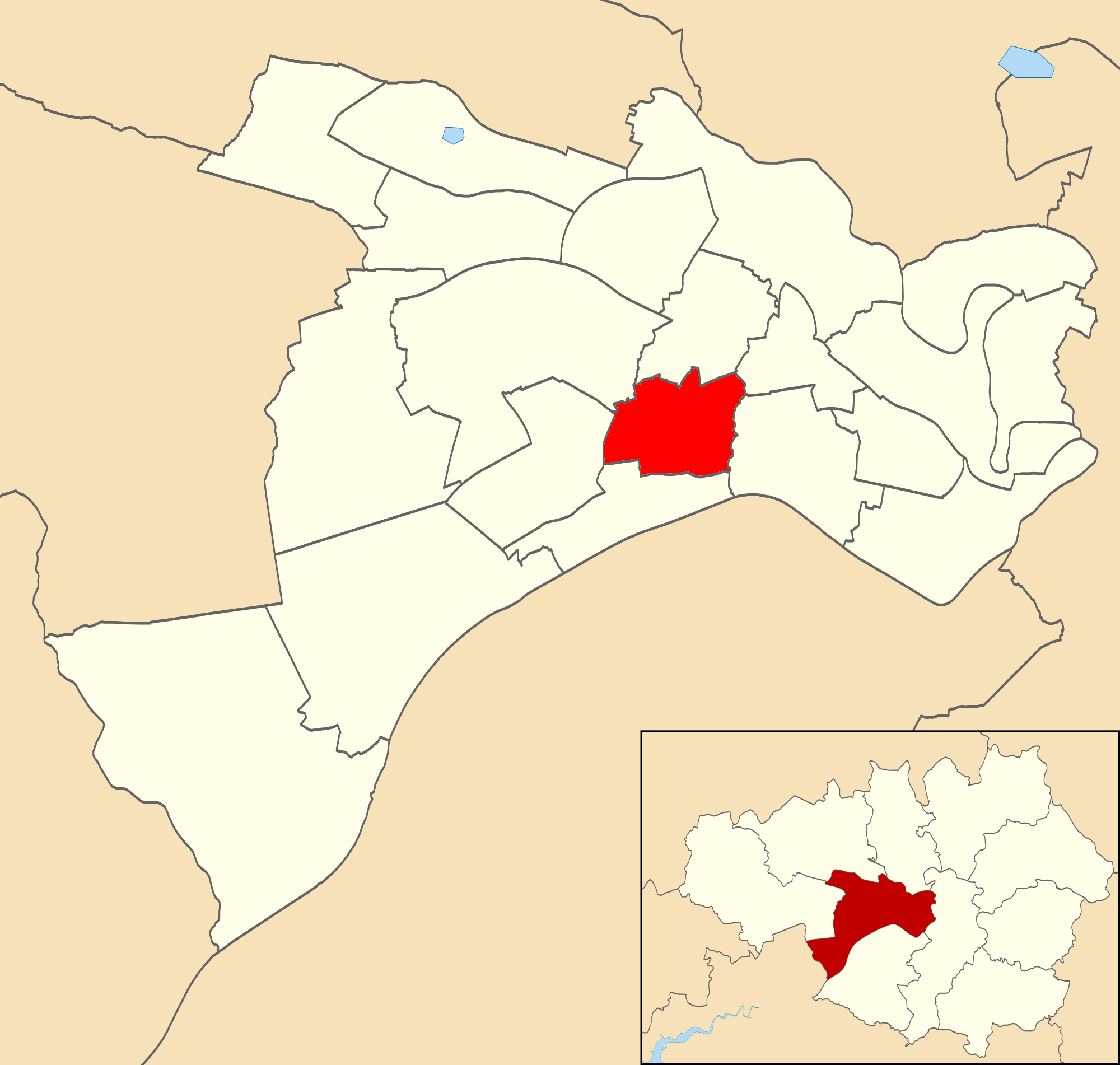
- Eccles ward within Salford City Council.

- Coat of arms
- Motto: Let the good (or safety) of the people be the supreme (or highest) law
- Interactive map of Eccles
- Coordinates: 53.4900°N 2.3428°W
- Country: United Kingdom
- Constituent country: England
- Region: North West England
- County: Greater Manchester
- Metropolitan borough: Salford
- Created: May 2004
- Named after: Eccles

Government UK Parliament constituency: Salford and Eccles
  - Type: Unicameral
  - Body: Salford City Council
  - Mayor of Salford: Paul Dennett (Labour)
  - Councillor: Sharmina August (Labour)
  - Councillor: Mike McCusker (Labour)
  - Councillor: Nathaniel Tetteh (Labour)

Population
  - Total: 11,499
- Ward profile conducted by Salford City Council in 2014

Eccles is an electoral ward of Salford, England. It is represented in Westminster by Rebecca Long-Bailey MP for Salford and Eccles. A profile of the ward conducted by Salford City Council in 2014 recorded a population of 11,499.

== Councillors ==
The ward is represented by three councillors: Sharmina August (Lab), Mike McCusker (Lab), and Nathaniel Tetteh (Lab).

Election	Councillor	Councillor	Councillor
2004	Peter Hayes (Lib Dem)	Edmund Sheehy (Lab)	Alan Broughton (Lab)
2006	Jane Murphy (Lab)	Edmund Sheehy (Lab)	Alan Broughton (Lab)
2007	Jane Murphy (Lab)	Ann Davies (Con)	Alan Broughton (Lab)
2008	Jane Murphy (Lab)	Ann Davies (Con)	Judith Tope (Con)
2010	John Cullen (Lab)	Ann Davies (Con)	Judith Tope (Con)
2011	John Cullen (Lab)	Lisa Stone (Lab)	Judith Tope (Con)
By-election; 20 October 2011	Michael Wheeler (Lab)	Lisa Stone (Lab)	Judith Tope (Con)
2012	Michael Wheeler (Lab)	Lisa Stone (Lab)	Peter Wheeler (Lab)
2014	Michael Wheeler (Lab)	Lisa Stone (Lab)	Peter Wheeler (Lab)
2015	Michael Wheeler (Lab)	Lisa Stone (Lab)	Peter Wheeler (Lab)
2016	Michael Wheeler (Lab)	Lisa Stone (Lab)	Peter Wheeler (Lab)
2018	Michael Wheeler (Lab)	Lisa Stone (Lab)	Peter Wheeler (Lab)
By-election; 27 September 2018	Michael Wheeler (Lab)	Lisa Stone (Lab)	Mike McCusker
2019	Michael Wheeler (Lab)	Sharmina August (Lab)	Mike McCusker (Lab)

indicates seat up for re-election. indicates seat won in by-election.

== Elections in 2010s ==
=== May 2019 ===
2019
Party	Candidate	Votes	%	±%
Labour	Sharmina August	1,272	44.5	
Conservative	David William Hotchkin	463	16.2	
UKIP	Keith Carter Hallam	361	12.6	
Green	Helen Alker	356	12.4	
Liberal Democrats	Lucas Webber	198	6.9	
Independent	Stef Lorenz	93	3.3	
Women's Equality	Annie Wood	86	3.0	
Socialist Alternative	Sally Griffiths	31	1.1	
Majority		809		
Turnout		2,875	31	
Labour hold		Swing		

=== By-election 27 September 2018 ===
By-election 27 September 2018
Party	Candidate	Votes	%	±%
Labour	Mike McCusker*	1,071	54.5	
Conservative	Andrew Darlington	474	24.1	
Liberal Democrats	Jake Overend	156	7.9	
Green	Helen Alker	123	6.2	
UKIP	Keith Hallam	100	5.1	
Women's Equality	Caroline Stephanie Dean	39	2	
Majority		597	30.4	
Turnout		1966	20.92	

=== May 2018 ===
2018
Party	Candidate	Votes	%	±%
Labour	Michael Wheeler*	1,748	60.3	
Conservative	David Hotchkin	638	22.0	
Green	Helen Alker	185	6.4	
Liberal Democrats	Guy Otten	169	5.8	
UKIP	Keith Hallam	134	4.6	
TUSC	Matt Kilsby	23	0.8	
Majority		1,110	38.3	
Turnout		2,902	31.33	
Labour hold		Swing		

=== May 2016 ===
2016
Party	Candidate	Votes	%	±%
Labour	Peter Wheeler*	1,873	61.7	+13.4
Conservative	Jonathan Alan Boot	707	23.3	−1.6
Green	Helen Margaret Alker	284	9.4	+3.3
TUSC	Sally Griffiths	173	5.7	+3.4
Majority		1,166	38.4	+15
Turnout		3,037	34.9	−27.1
Labour hold		Swing		

=== May 2015 ===
2015
Party	Candidate	Votes	%	±%
Labour	Lisa Margaret Stone*	2,612	48.3	−14.3
Conservative	Linda Goodall	1,347	24.9	−14.1
UKIP	Robert Wakefield	739	13.7	N/A
Green	Emma Van Dyke	327	6.1	N/A
Liberal Democrats	Val Kelly	257	4.8	−4.8
TUSC	Sally Griffiths	122	2.3	N/A
Majority		1,265	23.4	−11.4
Turnout		5,404	62.0	
Labour hold		Swing		

=== May 2014 ===
2014
Party	Candidate	Votes	%	±%
Labour	Michael Joseph Wheeler	1,861	62.6	
Conservative	Julie Fensome	827	27.8	
Liberal Democrats	Val Kelly	287	9.6	
Majority		1,034	34.8	
Turnout		2,975		
Labour hold		Swing		

=== May 2012 ===
2012
Party	Candidate	Votes	%	±%
Labour	Peter Wheeler	1,462	53.3	+15.7
Conservative	Nicholas Johnson	662	24.1	−22.6
UKIP	Alan Wright	281	10.2	N/A
Liberal Democrats	Val Kelly	212	7.7	−8.0
Independent	Kyle Wells	127	4.6	N/A
Majority		800	29.2	
Turnout		2,778	30.7	−5.6
Labour gain from Conservative		Swing		

=== By-election 20 October 2011 ===
By-election 20 October 2011
Party	Candidate	Votes	%	±%
Labour	Michael Wheeler	1,227	54.46	
Conservative	Nicholas Johnson	701	31.11	
BNP	Kay Pollitt	147	6.52	
Liberal Democrats	Valerie Kelly	125	5.54	
Independent	Alan Dominic Valentine	53	2.35	
Majority		526		
Turnout		2,260	25.15	
Labour hold		Swing		

=== May 2011 ===
2011
Party	Candidate	Votes	%	±%
Labour	Lisa Stone	1,877	55.1	+15.4
Conservative	Ann Davies*	950	27.9	−15.9
UKIP	Paul Doyle	368	10.8	N/A
Liberal Democrats	Stephen Ferrer	213	6.3	−10.2
Majority		927		
Turnout		3,529	38.3	
Labour gain from Conservative		Swing		

=== May 2010 ===
2010
Party	Candidate	Votes	%	±%
Labour	John Cullen	2,216	41.1	+3.5
Conservative	Abdul Mannan	1,625	30.2	−16.5
Liberal Democrats	Valerie Kelly	1,298	24.1	+8.4
Independent	Tim Perkins	214	4.0	+4.0
Majority		591	11.0	+1.9
Turnout		5,387	61.7	+25.5
Labour hold		Swing		

== Elections in 2000s ==
2008
Party	Candidate	Votes	%	±%
Conservative	Judith Tope	1,422	46.7	+2.9
Labour	Alan Broughton	1,144	37.6	−2.1
Liberal Democrats	Stephen Ferrer	479	15.7	−0.7
Majority		278	9.1	
Turnout			36.2	
Conservative gain from Labour		Swing		

2007
Party	Candidate	Votes	%	±%
Conservative	Ann Davies	1,303	43.8	
Labour	Eddie Sheehy*	1,180	39.7	
Liberal Democrats	Mariska Jones	489	16.5	
Majority		123		
Turnout		2,972	35.9	
Conservative gain from Labour		Swing		

2006
Party	Candidate	Votes	%	±%
Labour	Jane Murphy	1,038	39.2	
Conservative	Ann Davies	975	36.9	
Liberal Democrats	Christine Lomax	632	23.9	
Majority		63	2.3	
Turnout		2,645	33.6	−5.5
Labour hold		Swing		

2004
Party	Candidate	Votes	%	±%
Labour	Alan Broughton	1,247		
Labour	Edmund Sheehy	1,167		
Liberal Democrats	Peter Hayes	1,019		
Labour	Jane Murphy	928		
Conservative	Michael Edwards	919		
Liberal Democrats	Christine Lomax	814		
Conservative	Christine Upton	785		
Turnout		6,879	39.1	
Labour win (new seat)				
Labour win (new seat)				
Liberal Democrats win (new seat)				
