= Boothstown and Ellenbrook =

- Electoral ward
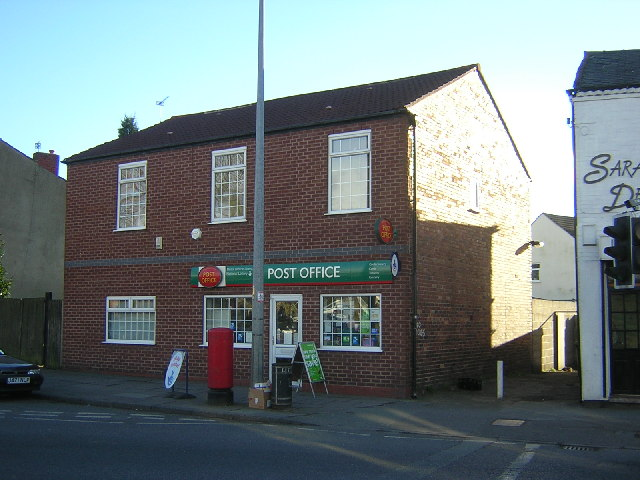
- Boothstown Post Office

- Coat of arms
- Motto: Let the good (or safety) of the people be the supreme (or highest) law
- Interactive map of Boothstown and Ellenbrook
- Coordinates: 53.511°N 2.412°W
- Country: United Kingdom
- Constituent country: England
- Region: North West England
- County: Greater Manchester
- Metropolitan borough: Salford
- Created: May 2004
- Named after: Boothstown and Ellenbrook, Greater Manchester

Government UK Parliament constituency: Worsley and Eccles South
  - Type: Unicameral
  - Body: Salford City Council
  - Mayor of Salford: Paul Dennett (Labour)
  - Councillor: Les Turner (Conservative)
  - Councillor: Robin Garrido (Conservative)
  - Councillor: Bob Clarke (Conservative)

Population
  - Total: 9,778
- Ward profile conducted by Salford City Council in 2014

Boothstown and Ellenbrook is an electoral ward of Salford, England. The ward was created in 2004 following recommendations made by the Boundary Committee for England. It is represented in Westminster by Barbara Keeley MP for Worsley and Eccles South. The 2011 Census recorded a population of 9,532. Following extensive boundary changes to wards across the City of Salford, Boothstown and Ellenbrook was expanded to include the village of Roe Green. These new boundaries were first contested on 6 May 2021 in all-out elections, requiring all three ward councillors to stand for re-election.

== Councillors ==
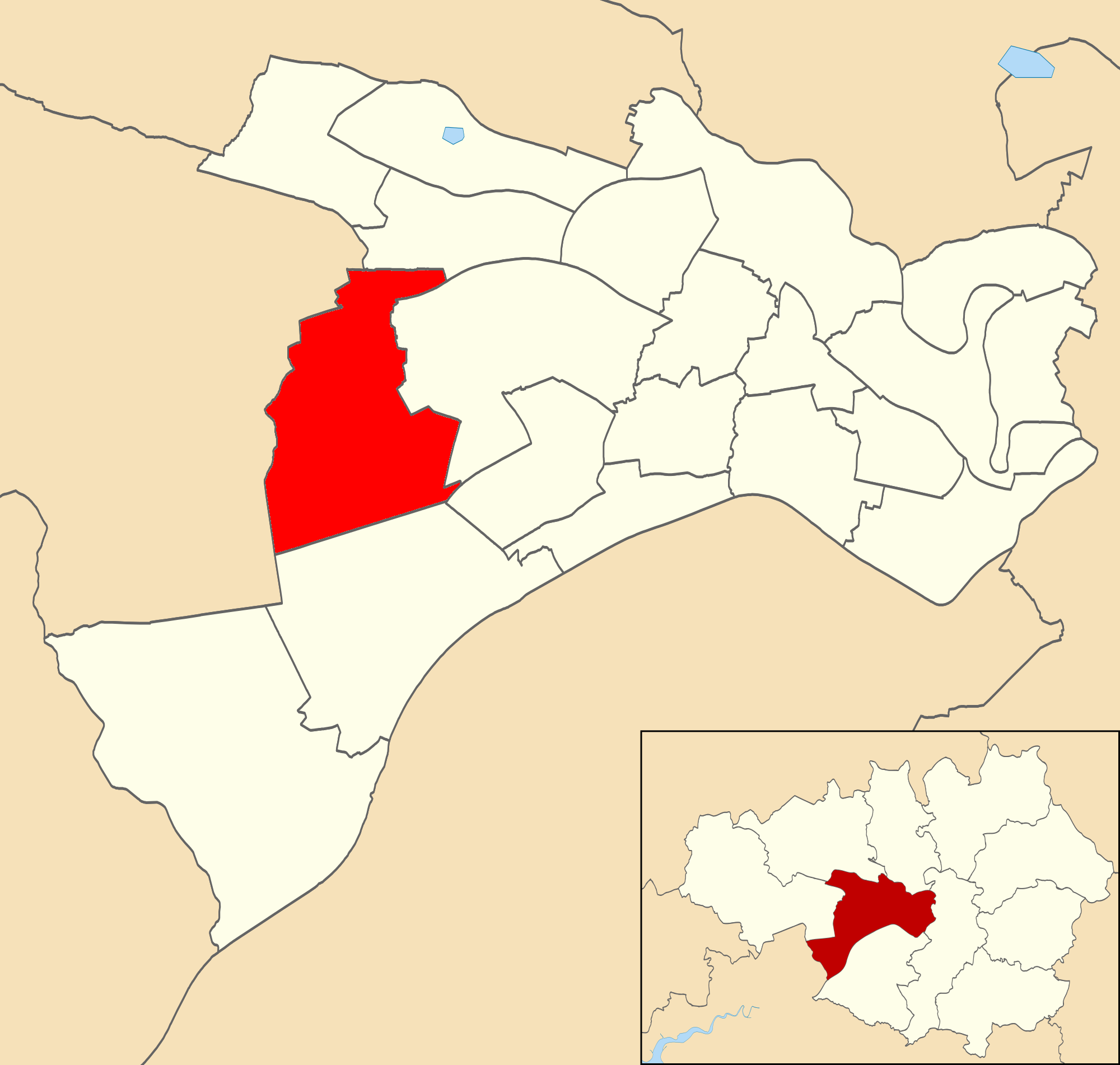
Boothstown and Ellenbrook electoral ward within Salford City Council.

The ward is represented by three councillors:

- Les Turner (Con)
- Darren Ward (Con)
- Bob Clarke (Con)

Election	Councillor	Councillor	Councillor
2004	Christine Gray (Con)	Robin Garrido (Con)	Beryl Howard (Con)
2006	Christine Gray (Con)	Robin Garrido (Con)	Beryl Howard (Con)
2007	Christine Gray (Con)	Robin Garrido (Con)	Beryl Howard (Con)
2008	Christine Gray (Con)	Robin Garrido (Con)	Andrew Cheetham (Con)
2010	Jillian Collinson (Con)	Robin Garrido (Con)	Andrew Cheetham (Con)
2011	Jillian Collinson (Con)	Robin Garrido (Con)	Andrew Cheetham (Con)
2012	Jillian Collinson (Con)	Robin Garrido (Con)	Andrew Cheetham (Con)
2014	Jillian Collinson (Con)	Robin Garrido (Con)	Andrew Cheetham (Con)
2015	Jillian Collinson (Con)	Robin Garrido (Con)	Andrew Cheetham (Con)
2016	Jillian Collinson (Con)	Robin Garrido (Con)	Bob Clarke (Con)
2018	Jillian Collinson (Con)	Robin Garrido (Con)	Bob Clarke (Con)
2019	Jillian Collinson (Con)	Darren Ward (Con)	Bob Clarke (Con)
2021	Les Turner (Con)	Darren Ward (Con)	Bob Clarke (Con)

indicates seat up for re-election.

== Elections in 2020s ==
=== May 2021 ===
2021
Party	Candidate	Votes	%	±%
Conservative	Bob Clarke	2,205	56.84	N/A
Conservative	Darren Ward	1,797	46.33	N/A
Conservative	Les Turner	1,345	34.67	N/A
Labour	Teresa Pepper	1,257	32.41	N/A
Labour	Cameron Robinson	1,209	31.17	N/A
Labour	Charlie Rowley	750	19.33	N/A
Green	Diana Battersby	499	12.86	N/A
Liberal Democrats	Ian Chisnall	354	9.13	N/A
Liberal Democrats	Gizella Hughes	140	3.61	N/A
Liberal Democrats	Sebastian Biesiadzinski	130	3.35	N/A
Turnout		3,879	39.84	N/A
Conservative win (new seat)				
Conservative win (new seat)				
Conservative win (new seat)				

Boundary changes in wards across the City of Salford meant that all three councillors in each ward were required to stand for re-election in the May 2020 poll, although this was postponed for one year due to the COVID-19 pandemic.

== Elections in 2010s ==
=== May 2019 ===
2019
Party	Candidate	Votes	%	±%
Conservative	Darren Ward	1,378	52.18	−4.16
Labour	Phil Cusack	731	27.68	−7.35
Green	Diana Battersby	314	11.89	+8.99
UKIP	John Bailey	200	7.57	+5.37
Majority		647	24.50	
Turnout		2,641	34.94	+0.94
Conservative hold		Swing	+1.60	

=== May 2018 ===
2018
Party	Candidate	Votes	%	±%
Conservative	Jillian Collinson*	1,456	56.4	
Labour	Phil Cusack	906	35.1	
Liberal Democrats	Ian McKinlay	87	3.4	
Green	Morvern Rennie	75	2.9	
UKIP	Arthur Snelgrove	57	2.2	
Majority		551	21.3	
Turnout		2,586	34.08	
Conservative hold		Swing		

=== May 2016 ===
2016
Party	Candidate	Votes	%	±%
Conservative	Bob Clarke	1,389	50.6	−7.2
Labour	Lee Colin Rowbotham	739	26.9	−4.3
UKIP	Joseph William Evans	386	14.1	N/A
Green	Lauren Amy Barnes	192	7.0	−1.1
TUSC	Kit Watson	23	0.8	−1.4
Majority		650	23.7	−2.8
Turnout		2,744	36.8	−30.7
Conservative hold		Swing		

=== May 2015 ===
2015
Party	Candidate	Votes	%	±%
Conservative	Robin Garrido*	2,924	57.8	+15.7
Labour	Lee Colin Rowbotham	1,580	31.2	+3.9
Green	Linda Margaret Davies	410	8.1	−1.6
TUSC	Wayne Peter Tomlinson	109	2.2	N/A
Majority		1,344	26.5	−15.6
Turnout		5,063	67.5	
Conservative hold		Swing		

=== May 2014 ===
2014
Party	Candidate	Votes	%	±%
Conservative	Jillian Collinson*	1,117	42.1	
Labour	Mike Pevitt	723	27.3	
UKIP	David Wibberley	554	20.9	
Green	Diana Joy Battersby	258	9.7	
Majority		394	14.9	
Turnout		2,652		
Conservative hold		Swing		

=== May 2012 ===
2012
Party	Candidate	Votes	%	±%
Conservative	Andy Cheetham*	1,179	49.4	−18.4
Labour	Mike Pevitt	778	32.6	+16.7
UKIP	Paul Woodburn	181	7.6	N/A
Green	Tom Dylan	134	5.6	N/A
Liberal Democrats	James Gregory	115	4.8	−11.6
Majority		401	16.8	
Turnout		2,404	31.3	−4.9
Conservative hold		Swing		

=== May 2011 ===
2011
Party	Candidate	Votes	%	±%
Conservative	Robin Garrido*	1,521	51.5	−7.4
Labour	Thomas Murphy	988	33.4	+13.3
Liberal Democrats	Sheila Mulleady	236	8.0	−7.7
UKIP	David Hudson	211	7.1	N/A
Majority				
Turnout				

=== May 2010 ===
2010
Party	Candidate	Votes	%	±%
Conservative	Jillian Collinson	2,583	49.9	−17.8
Labour	Stephen Ord	1,536	29.7	+13.8
Liberal Democrats	Sheila Mulleady	1,029	19.9	+3.5
Majority		1,047	20.2	−31.1
Turnout		5,174	68.3	+32.1
Conservative hold		Swing		

== Elections in 2000s ==
2008
Party	Candidate	Votes	%	±%
Conservative	Andrew Cheetham	1,867	67.7	+8.8
Liberal Democrats	Catherine Connett	452	16.4	+0.7
Labour	Abdul Shahid	437	15.9	−4.2
Majority		1,415	51.3	
Turnout			36.2	
Conservative hold		Swing		

2007
Party	Candidate	Votes	%	±%
Conservative	Robin Garrido*	1,520	58.9	
Labour	Philip Cusack	518	20.1	
Liberal Democrats	Matthew Drake	404	15.7	
Green	Roy Battersby	137	5.3	
Majority		1,002		
Turnout		2,579	34.1	
Conservative hold		Swing		

2006
Party	Candidate	Votes	%	±%
Conservative	Christine Gray	1,354	54.3	
Labour	Philip Cusack	615	24.7	
Liberal Democrats	Ronald Benjamin	300	12.0	
Green	Roy Battersby	224	9.0	
Majority		739	29.6	
Turnout		2,493	33.3	−7.6
Conservative hold		Swing		

2004
Party	Candidate	Votes	%	±%
Conservative	Beryl Howard	1,458		
Conservative	Robin Garrido	1,363		
Conservative	Christine Gray	1,309		
Liberal Democrats	Michael Dunn	986		
Liberal Democrats	Gary Riding	912		
Liberal Democrats	Joan Higgin	691		
Labour	Neville Gregory	526		
Labour	Michael Felse	474		
Labour	Andrew Nicol	464		
Turnout		8,183	40.9	
Conservative win (new seat)				
Conservative win (new seat)				
Conservative win (new seat)				
