= Higher Irlam and Peel Green =

Electoral ward of Salford, England

- Electoral ward
- Country: United Kingdom
- Constituent country: England
- Region: North West England
- County: Greater Manchester
- Metropolitan borough: Salford
- Created: May 2021
- Named for: Irlam and Peel Green

Government UK Parliament constituency: Worsley and Eccles South
  - Type: Unicameral
  - Body: Salford City Council
  - Mayor of Salford: Paul Dennett (Labour)
  - Councillor: Tracy Kelly (Labour)
  - Councillor: Mishal Saeed (Labour)
  - Councillor: John Walsh (Labour)

Higher Irlam and Peel Green is an electoral ward of Salford, England created by the Local Government Boundary Commission for England (LGBCE) for the 2021 local elections.

It is represented in Westminster by Barbara Keeley MP for Worsley and Eccles South. The first councillors for the ward were elected at the 2021 local elections.

== Councillors ==
The ward is represented by three councillors, each elected for a four-year term.

The current councillors for the ward are Tracy Kelly (Lab), Roger Jones (Lab), and Peter Taylor (Lab).

Election	Councillor	Councillor	Councillor
2021	Tracy Kelly (Lab)	Roger Jones (Lab)	Peter Taylor (Lab)

indicates seat up for re-election.

== Elections in 2020s ==
(*) denotes incumbent councillor seeking re-election.

=== May 2022 ===
2022 Salford City Council election
Party	Candidate	Votes	%	±%
Labour	Mishal Saeed	1,317	63.2	+10.8
Conservative	Saqib Aftab	381	18.3	−5.5
Liberal Democrats	Kenneth Thompson	364	17.5	N/A
Majority		936	44.9	
Turnout		2084	21.41	−4.45
Registered electors		9,733		
Labour hold		Swing		

=== May 2021 ===
2021 Salford City Council election
Party	Candidate	Votes	%	±%
Labour	Tracy Kelly	1,320	52.4	N/A
Labour	Roger Jones	1,251	49.7	N/A
Labour	Peter Taylor	1,070	42.5	N/A
Conservative	Edson Ferreira	599	23.8	N/A
Core Independents	Paula Goulden	506	20.1	N/A
Core Independents	Nigel Perry	444	17.6	N/A
Core Independents	Darren Goulden	432	17.2	N/A
Conservative	Javaid Hussain	285	11.3	N/A
Turnout		2,517	25.86	N/A
Labour win (new seat)				
Labour win (new seat)				
Labour win (new seat)				
