= Bury Council elections =

Local government elections in Greater Manchester, England

Bury Metropolitan Borough Council elections are generally held three years out of every four, with a third of the council being elected each time. Bury Metropolitan Borough Council, generally known as Bury Council, is the local authority for the metropolitan borough of Bury in Greater Manchester, England. Since the last boundary changes in 2022, 51 councillors have been elected from 17 wards.

== Council elections ==
- 1998 Bury Metropolitan Borough Council election
- 1999 Bury Metropolitan Borough Council election
- 2000 Bury Metropolitan Borough Council election
- 2002 Bury Metropolitan Borough Council election
- 2003 Bury Metropolitan Borough Council election
- 2004 Bury Metropolitan Borough Council election (whole Metropolitan Borough Council elected after boundary changes increased the number of seats by 3)
- 2006 Bury Metropolitan Borough Council election
- 2007 Bury Metropolitan Borough Council election
- 2008 Bury Metropolitan Borough Council election
- 2010 Bury Metropolitan Borough Council election
- 2011 Bury Metropolitan Borough Council election
- 2012 Bury Metropolitan Borough Council election
- 2014 Bury Metropolitan Borough Council election
- 2015 Bury Metropolitan Borough Council election
- 2016 Bury Metropolitan Borough Council election
- 2018 Bury Metropolitan Borough Council election
- 2019 Bury Metropolitan Borough Council election
- 2021 Bury Metropolitan Borough Council election
- 2022 Bury Metropolitan Borough Council election (new ward boundaries)
- 2023 Bury Metropolitan Borough Council election
- 2024 Bury Metropolitan Borough Council election
- 2026 Bury Metropolitan Borough Council election

== Results maps ==
2004 results map

2006 results map

2007 results map

2008 results map

2010 results map

2011 results map

2012 results map

2014 results map

2015 results map

2016 results map

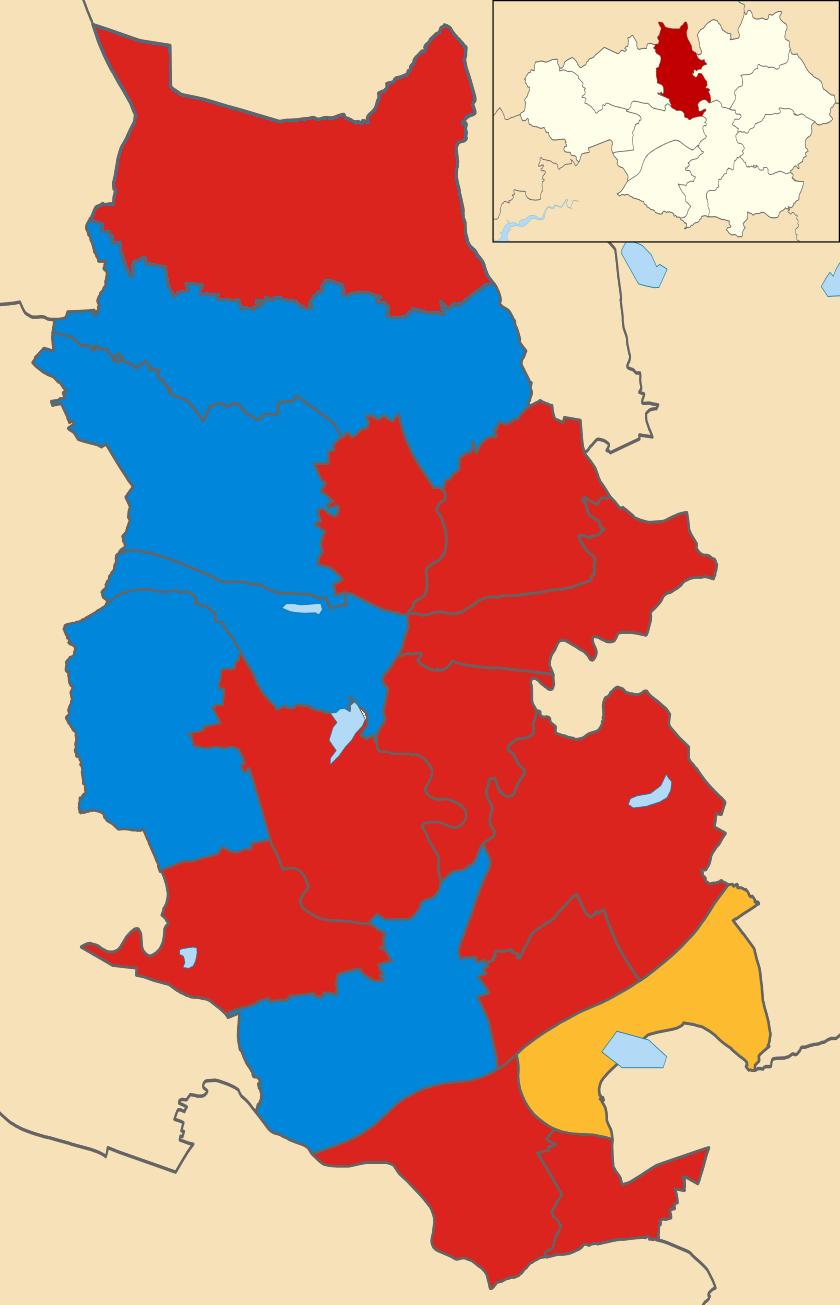
2018 results map

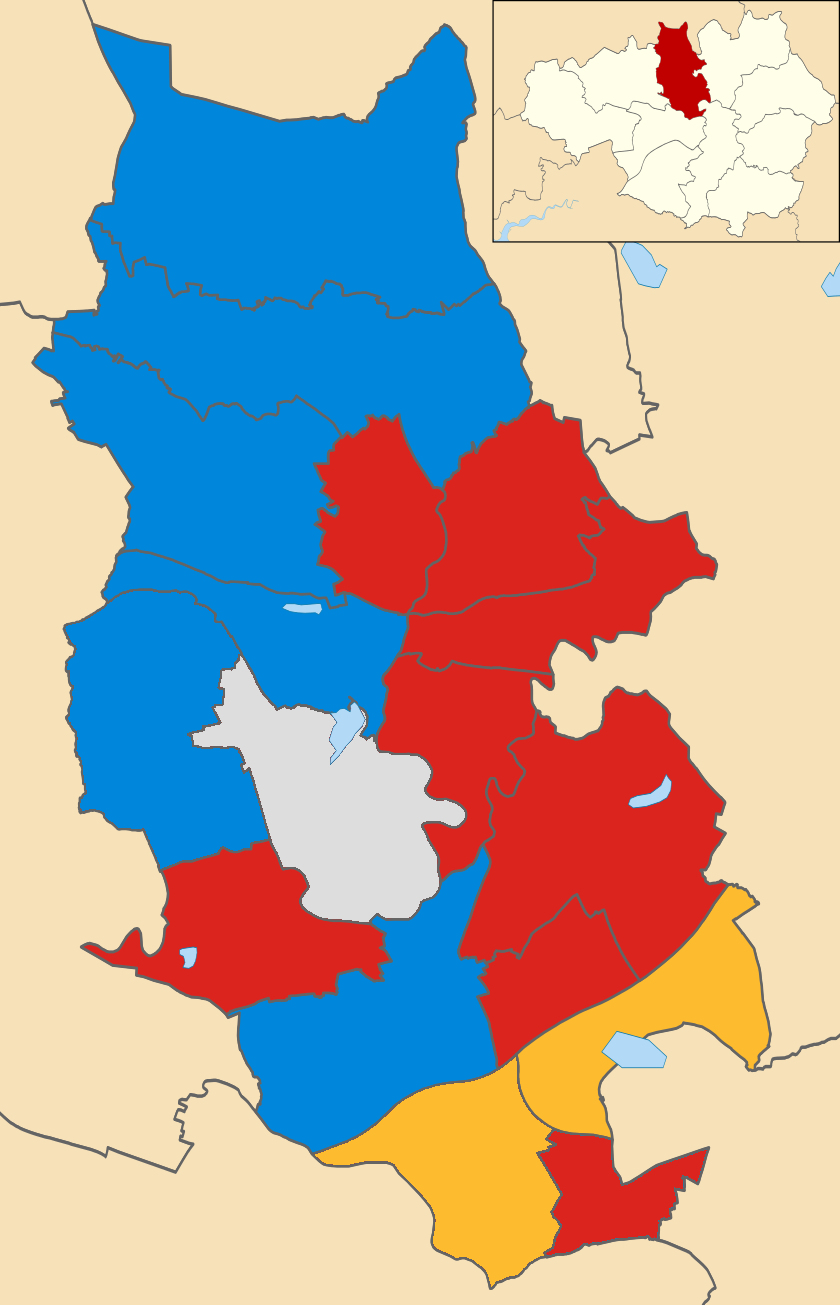
2019 results map

2021 results map

2022 results map

2023 results map

2024 results map

2026 results map

== By-election results ==
=== 1994-1998 ===
Redvales By-Election 27 June 1996
Party	Candidate	Votes	%	±%
Labour		1,497	75.6	
Conservative		376	19.0	
Independent		106	5.4	
Majority		1,121	56.6	
Turnout		1,979		
Labour hold		Swing		

=== 1998-2002 ===
Holyrood By-Election 22 June 2000
Party	Candidate	Votes	%	±%
Liberal Democrats		960	52.1	−4.3
Labour		559	30.3	+5.9
Conservative		325	17.6	−1.6
Majority		401	21.8	
Turnout		1,844	22.5	
Liberal Democrats hold		Swing		

Radcliffe South By-Election 7 June 2001
Party	Candidate	Votes	%	±%
Labour	Anthony Cummings	2,473	55.8	+10.5
Conservative	Peter Wright	1,360	37.7	−14.3
Liberal Democrats	Mike Halsall	597	13.5	+3.8
Majority		1,113	18.1	
Turnout		4,430	55.1	
Labour hold		Swing		

=== 2006-2010 ===
Radcliffe West By-Election 4 June 2009
Party	Candidate	Votes	%	±%
Labour	Rishi Shori	879	30.7	−13.9
Conservative	Samantha Davies	870	30.4	+3.1
BNP	Jean Purdy	459	16.0	−2.2
Liberal Democrats	Mike Halsall	429	15.0	+8.4
English Democrat	Stephen Morris	228	8.0	+8.0
Majority		9	0.3	
Turnout		2,865	35.1	
Labour hold		Swing		

=== 2010-2014 ===
Church By-Election 15 November 2012
Party	Candidate	Votes	%	±%
Conservative	Susan Nuttall	1,371	48.6	−2.6
Labour	Sarah Kerrison	1,108	39.2	+5.2
UKIP	Stephen Evans	309	10.9	−0.2
Liberal Democrats	Kamran Islam	35	1.2	−2.5
Majority		263	9.3	
Turnout		2,823		
Conservative hold		Swing		

North Manor By-Election 15 November 2012
Party	Candidate	Votes	%	±%
Conservative	James Daly	1,324	54.3	−2.4
Labour	Jean Treadgold	643	26.4	−0.8
UKIP	Peter Entwistle	251	10.3	+10.3
Green	Stewart Hay	126	5.2	−5.6
Liberal Democrats	Ewan Arthur	93	3.8	−1.5
Majority		681	27.9	
Turnout		2,437		
Conservative hold		Swing		

Ramsbottom By-Election 6 March 2014
Party	Candidate	Votes	%	±%
Conservative	Robert Hodkinson	1,398	47.0	+8.8
Labour	Sarah Southworth	1,033	34.7	−14.7
UKIP	Dave Barker	351	11.8	+2.6
Green	Glyn Heath	157	5.3	+5.3
Liberal Democrats	David Foss	38	1.3	−1.9
Majority		365	12.3	
Turnout		2,977		
Conservative gain from Labour		Swing		

=== 2014-2018 ===
Tottington By-Election 22 October 2015
Party	Candidate	Votes	%	±%
Conservative	Greg Keeley	1,046	52.2	+3.4
Labour	Martin Hayes	619	30.9	+2.0
UKIP	Ian Henderson	198	9.9	−4.4
Liberal Democrats	David Foss	87	4.3	+0.8
Green	John Southworth	54	2.7	−1.8
Majority		427	21.3	
Turnout		2,004		
Conservative gain from Labour		Swing		

Besses By-Election 4 May 2017
Party	Candidate	Votes	%	±%
Labour	Andrea Simpson	1,371	50.0	−8.7
Conservative	Satyen Sinha	682	24.9	+4.9
Liberal Democrats	Gavin Warnes	415	15.1	+10.7
English Democrat	Stephen Morris	188	6.9	−4.6
Green	Janneke Calle	86	3.1	−2.3
Majority		689	25.1	
Turnout		2,742		
Labour hold		Swing		

Radcliffe East By-Election 8 June 2017
Party	Candidate	Votes	%	±%
Labour	Karen Leach	2,861	53.4	+3.8
Conservative	James Mason	2,046	38.2	+20.9
Liberal Democrats	Robert Graham	232	4.3	−1.4
Green	Nicole Haydock	221	4.1	−3.1
Majority		815	15.2	
Turnout		5,360		
Labour hold		Swing		

=== 2018-2022 ===
Besses By-Election 19 July 2018
Party	Candidate	Votes	%	±%
Labour	Lucy Smith	999	51.1	−8.6
Conservative	Jordan Lewis	708	36.2	+12.9
English Democrat	Stephen Morris	72	3.7	−3.4
Liberal Democrats	Gareth Lloyd-Johnson	71	3.6	−1.3
Green	Glyn Heath	55	2.8	−2.2
UKIP	Michael Zwierzanski	49	2.5	+2.5
Majority		291	14.9	
Turnout		1,954		
Labour hold		Swing		

East By-Election 16 August 2018
Party	Candidate	Votes	%	±%
Labour	Gavin McGill	1,419	64.2	+4.8
Conservative	Sohail Raja	557	25.2	−8.9
UKIP	Angela Zwierzanski	107	4.8	+4.8
Green	Glyn Heath	77	3.5	−3.1
Liberal Democrats	Andy Minty	49	2.2	+2.2
Majority		862	39.0	
Turnout		2,209		
Labour hold		Swing		

Radcliffe West By-Election 29 August 2019
Party	Candidate	Votes	%	±%
Radcliffe First	Mike Smith	824	41.7	+41.7
Labour	Jamie Walker	708	35.8	−3.4
Conservative	Jordan Lewis	283	14.3	−1.2
Liberal Democrats	Kingsley Jones	113	5.7	+2.8
UKIP	Anthony Clough	50	2.5	+2.5
Majority		116	5.9	
Turnout		1,978		
Radcliffe First gain from Labour				

Church By-Election 12 December 2019
Party	Candidate	Votes	%	±%
Conservative	Dene Vernon	3,317	55.9	−0.8
Labour	Sam Turner	2,172	36.6	+9.2
Green	Charlie Allen	235	4.0	−6.0
Liberal Democrats	Stephen Lewis	213	3.6	−2.3
Majority		1,145	19.3	
Turnout		5,937		
Conservative hold		Swing		

=== 2022-2026 ===
Tottington By-Election 2 April 2026
Party	Candidate	Votes	%	±%
Reform	George Martin	929	39.5	+39.5
Conservative	Emma Lee	627	26.7	−18.8
Labour	Drew Bell	346	14.7	−14.3
Green	Chloe King	257	10.9	+10.9
Together for Bury	Greg Keeley	193	8.2	+8.2
Majority		302	12.8	
Turnout		2,352		
Reform gain from Conservative		Swing		
