= 2023 Bury Metropolitan Borough Council election =

United Kingdom local election

2023 Bury Metropolitan Council election
- 4 May 2023

17 out of 51 seats of Bury Metropolitan Borough Council 26 seats needed for a majority
- Turnout: 34.3% ▼5.0 pp

| | First party | Second party | Third party |
|---|---|---|---|
| Leader | Eamonn O'Brien | Russell Bernstein | Mike Smith |
| Party | Labour | Conservative | Radcliffe First |
| Leader's seat | St Mary’s | Pilkington Park | Radcliffe West |
| Last election | 29 seats, 44.6% | 12 seats, 34.4% | 8 seats, 7.7% |
| Seats before | 28 | 12 | 8 |
| Seats won | 11 | 4 | 2 |
| Seats after | 31 | 11 | 8 |
| Seat change | ▲3 | ▼1 | Steady |
| Popular vote | 22,299 | 14,077 | 3,773 |
| Percentage | 46.3% | 29.2% | 7.8% |
| Swing | ▲1.7% | ▼5.2% | ▲0.1% |
| | Fourth party | Fifth party |
| Leader | None | Cristina Tegolo |
| Party | Independent | Liberal Democrats |
| Leader's seat | | Holyrood |
| Last election | 1 seat, 0.3% | 1 seat, 6.9% |
| Seats before | 2 | 1 |
| Seats won | 0 | 0 |
| Seats after | 1 | 0 |
| Seat change | ▼1 | ▼1 |
| Popular vote | 1,826 | 2,627 |
| Percentage | 3.8% | 5.5% |
| Swing | ▲3.5% | ▼1.4% |
- The winner of each seat by party in the 2023 Bury Metropolitan Council Election
Leader before election
Eamonn O'Brien
Labour
Leader after election
Eamonn O'Brien
Labour

The 2023 Bury Metropolitan Borough Council elections took place on 4 May 2023 alongside other local elections across the United Kingdom. One third of seats (17) on Bury Metropolitan Borough Council were contested. The Labour Party retained its control of the council.

== Background ==
The Local Government Act 1972 created a two-tier system of metropolitan counties and districts covering Greater Manchester, Merseyside, South Yorkshire, Tyne and Wear, the West Midlands, and West Yorkshire starting in 1974. Bury was a district of the Greater Manchester metropolitan county. The Local Government Act 1985 abolished the metropolitan counties, with metropolitan districts taking on most of their powers as metropolitan boroughs. The Greater Manchester Combined Authority was created in 2011 and began electing the mayor of Greater Manchester from 2017, which was given strategic powers covering a region coterminous with the former Greater Manchester metropolitan county.

Since its formation, Bury has variously been under Labour control, Conservative control and no overall control. Councillors have predominantly been elected from the Labour Party and the Conservative Party, with some Liberal Democrat and independent councillors also serving. The council has had an overall Labour majority since the 2011 election.

In the previous election in 2022, where all 51 seats were up for election due to boundary changes, Labour won 29 seats, the Conservatives won 12 seats, Radcliffe First won eight seats, and the Liberal Democrats and an independent won one seat each.

Labour retained control of the council at this election.

== Electoral process ==
The council generally elects its councillors in thirds, with a third being up for election every year for three years, with no election in the fourth year. The election was conducted using the first-past-the-post voting system, with each ward electing one councillor.

All registered electors (British, Irish, Commonwealth and European Union citizens) living in Bury aged 18 or over were entitled to vote in the election. People who lived at two addresses in different councils, such as university students with different term-time and holiday addresses, were entitled to be registered for and vote in elections in both local authorities. Voting in-person at polling stations took place from 07:00 to 22:00 on election day, and voters were able to apply for postal votes or proxy votes in advance of the election.

== Council composition ==
| After 2022 election | | Before 2023 election | |
| Party | Seats | Party | Seats |
|---|---|---|---|
| Labour | 29 | Labour | 28 |
| Conservative | 12 | Conservative | 12 |
| Radcliffe First | 8 | Radcliffe First | 8 |
| Liberal Democrats | 1 | Liberal Democrats | 1 |
| Independent | 1 | Independent | 2 |

== Results summary ==
Bury Metropolitan Borough Council
| Party | This election | | | | Full council | | | This election | | |
| Party | Candidates | Seats | Net | Seats % | Other | Total | Total % | Votes | Votes % | +/− |
|---|---|---|---|---|---|---|---|---|---|---|
| Labour | {{{candidates}}} | 11 | +3 ▲ | 64.7 | 20 | 31 | 60.8 | 22,299 | 46.3 | +1.7 |
| Conservative | {{{candidates}}} | 4 | -1 ▼ | 23.5 | 7 | 11 | 21.6 | 14,077 | 29.2 | -5.2 |
| Radcliffe First | {{{candidates}}} | 2 | 0 | 11.8 | 6 | 8 | 15.7 | 3,773 | 7.8 | +0.1 |
| Independent | {{{candidates}}} | 0 | -1 ▼ | 0.0 | 1 | 1 | 1.9 | 1,826 | 3.8 | +3.5 |
| Green | {{{candidates}}} | 0 | 0 | 0.0 | 0 | 0 | 0.0 | 3,193 | 6.6 | +2.0 |
| Liberal Democrats | {{{candidates}}} | 0 | -1 ▼ | 0.0 | 0 | 0 | 0.0 | 2,627 | 5.5 | -1.4 |
| English Democrat | {{{candidates}}} | 0 | 0 | 0.0 | 0 | 0 | 0.0 | 241 | 0.5 | +0.4 |
| Reform | {{{candidates}}} | 0 | 0 | 0.0 | 0 | 0 | 0.0 | 105 | 0.2 | 0.0 |
| Communist | {{{candidates}}} | 0 | 0 | 0.0 | 0 | 0 | 0.0 | 37 | 0.1 | 0.0 |

== Ward results ==
Incumbent councillors are marked with an asterisk (*).

=== Besses ===
Besses (1)
| Party | Candidate | Votes | % | ±% |
|---|---|---|---|---|
| Labour Co-op | Lucy Smith* | 1,567 | 69.1 | +12.1 |
| Independent | Martyn West | 216 | 9.5 | −3.4 |
| Conservative | Antonello Riu | 201 | 8.9 | −13.4 |
| Green | Cameron Fay | 146 | 6.4 | −8.0 |
| English Democrat | Stephen Morris | 139 | 6.1 | −0.7 |
| Majority | | 1,351 | | |
| Rejected ballots | | 13 | | |
| Turnout | | 2,269 | 28 | |
| Registered electors | | | | |
| Labour Co-op hold | | Swing | | |

=== Bury East ===
Bury East (1)
| Party | Candidate | Votes | % | ±% |
|---|---|---|---|---|
| Labour | Ummrana Farooq* | 1,223 | 55.9 | +14.1 |
| Conservative | Christopher Baron | 624 | 28.5 | −9.3 |
| Green | Lauren Hutchinson | 147 | 6.7 | −5.3 |
| Reform | Kevin Cadwallader | 105 | 4.8 | −3.7 |
| Liberal Democrats | Stephen Lewis | 89 | 4.1 | −3.8 |
| Majority | | | | |
| Rejected ballots | | 17 | | |
| Turnout | | 2,188 | 25.00 | |
| Registered electors | | | | |
| Labour hold | | Swing | | |

=== Bury West ===
Bury West (1)
| Party | Candidate | Votes | % | ±% |
|---|---|---|---|---|
| Conservative | Shahbaz Arif* | 1,596 | 50.1 | +3.7 |
| Labour | Adnan Chaudhry | 1,112 | 34.9 | +0.8 |
| Green | Jacqui Connor | 480 | 15.1 | +1.4 |
| Majority | | | | |
| Rejected ballots | | 21 | | |
| Turnout | | 3,188 | 38.00 | |
| Registered electors | | | | |
| Conservative hold | | Swing | | |

=== Elton ===
Elton (1)
| Party | Candidate | Votes | % | ±% |
|---|---|---|---|---|
| Labour | Charlotte Morris* | 1,623 | 48.4 | +1.7 |
| Conservative | Andrew Luxton | 1,486 | 44.3 | −1.9 |
| Green | Michelle Sampson | 158 | 4.7 | N/A |
| Independent | Raymond Solomon | 86 | 2.6 | N/A |
| Majority | | 137 | | |
| Rejected ballots | | 4 | | |
| Turnout | | 3,353 | | |
| Registered electors | | | | |
| Labour hold | | Swing | | |

=== Holyrood ===
Holyrood (1)
| Party | Candidate | Votes | % | ±% |
|---|---|---|---|---|
| Labour | Lynn Ryder | 1,696 | 47.6 | +6.7 |
| Liberal Democrats | Steven Wright | 1,446 | 40.6 | −1.9 |
| Conservative | Geoffrey Baron | 162 | 4.5 | −5.2 |
| Green | Peter Curati | 156 | 4.4 | −4.9 |
| English Democrat | Valerie Morris | 102 | 2.9 | N/A |
| Majority | | 250 | | |
| Rejected ballots | | 7 | | |
| Turnout | | 3,562 | 41 | |
| Registered electors | | | | |
| Labour gain from Liberal Democrats | | Swing | | |

=== Moorside ===
Moorside (1)
| Party | Candidate | Votes | % | ±% |
|---|---|---|---|---|
| Labour | Babar Ibrahim | 1,429 | 56.0 | +6.9 |
| Conservative | Samia Farid | 697 | 27.3 | −9.4 |
| Independent | Victor Cromwell Hagan | 216 | 8.5 | −0.1 |
| Green | Karen Lesley Wood | 208 | 8.2 | −2.4 |
| Majority | | 732 | | |
| Rejected ballots | | 8 | | |
| Turnout | | 2,550 | 30 | |
| Registered electors | | | | |
| Labour hold | | Swing | | |

=== North Manor ===
North Manor (1)
| Party | Candidate | Votes | % | ±% |
|---|---|---|---|---|
| Conservative | Khalid Hussain* | 1,571 | 42.5 | −2.7 |
| Labour | John Southworth | 1,489 | 40.3 | +0.4 |
| Green | Charlie Allen | 501 | 13.5 | −9.7 |
| Liberal Democrats | Ewan Arthur | 137 | 3.7 | −15.6 |
| Majority | | 82 | | |
| Rejected ballots | | 12 | | |
| Turnout | | 3,698 | 45 | |
| Registered electors | | | | |
| Conservative hold | | Swing | | |

=== Pilkington Park ===
Pilkington Park (1)
| Party | Candidate | Votes | % | ±% |
|---|---|---|---|---|
| Labour | Michael Rubinstein | 1,557 | 48.2 | +5.4 |
| Conservative | Nick Jones* | 1,177 | 36.4 | −7.9 |
| Independent | Shadman Zaman | 237 | 7.3 | N/A |
| Green | Chlöe Thomas | 129 | 4.0 | −10.9 |
| Liberal Democrats | David Foss | 94 | 2.9 | N/A |
| Communist | Dan Ross | 37 | 1.1 | N/A |
| Majority | | 380 | | |
| Rejected ballots | | 9 | | |
| Turnout | | 3,231 | 43 | |
| Registered electors | | | | |
| Labour gain from Conservative | | Swing | | |

=== Radcliffe East ===
Radcliffe East (1)
| Party | Candidate | Votes | % | ±% |
|---|---|---|---|---|
| Radcliffe First | Mary Walsh* | 1,329 | 60.2 | +8.7 |
| Labour | Sally-Ann McGill | 636 | 28.8 | −0.7 |
| Conservative | Carol Bernstein | 175 | 7.9 | −3.9 |
| Green | Heather Sharples | 66 | 3.0 | −2.5 |
| Majority | | 693 | | |
| Rejected ballots | | 7 | | |
| Turnout | | 2,206 | 27 | |
| Registered electors | | | | |
| Radcliffe First hold | | Swing | | |

=== Radcliffe North & Ainsworth ===
Radcliffe North & Ainsworth (1)
| Party | Candidate | Votes | % | ±% |
|---|---|---|---|---|
| Conservative | Jo Lancaster* | 1,279 | 38.7 | +3.0 |
| Radcliffe First | Ken Simpson | 1,218 | 36.8 | +3.2 |
| Labour | Richard Jamieson | 731 | 22.1 | −1.8 |
| Green | Gary Kirkley | 80 | 2.4 | −0.6 |
| Majority | | 71 | | |
| Rejected ballots | | 15 | | |
| Turnout | | 3,308 | 35 | |
| Registered electors | | | | |
| Conservative hold | | Swing | | |

=== Radcliffe West ===
Radcliffe West (1)
| Party | Candidate | Votes | % | ±% |
|---|---|---|---|---|
| Radcliffe First | Mike Smith* | 1,226 | 56.9 | +12.0 |
| Labour | Josh Harcup | 669 | 31.1 | −6.3 |
| Conservative | Shirley Balfour | 193 | 9.0 | −4.9 |
| Green | Mary Heath | 47 | 2.2 | −2.7 |
| Liberal Democrats | Kamran Islam | 19 | 0.9 | −1.8 |
| Majority | | 557 | | |
| Rejected ballots | | 7 | | |
| Turnout | | 2,154 | 26 | |
| Registered electors | | | | |
| Radcliffe First hold | | Swing | | |

=== Ramsbottom ===
Incumbent councillor Spencer Donnelly was suspended from the Labour Party in September 2022 and sat as an independent for the remainder of his term.

Ramsbottom (1)
| Party | Candidate | Votes | % | ±% |
|---|---|---|---|---|
| Labour | Gareth Staples-Jones | 2,062 | 56.4 | +8.7 |
| Conservative | Ian Strachan | 1,296 | 35.5 | −4.7 |
| Green | Waleed Hamdan | 149 | 4.1 | −5.8 |
| Liberal Democrats | Martyn Bristow | 147 | 4.0 | −7.0 |
| Majority | | 766 | | |
| Rejected ballots | | 16 | | |
| Turnout | | 3,654 | 40 | |
| Registered electors | | | | |
| Labour gain from Independent | | Swing | | |

=== Redvales ===
Redvales (1)
| Party | Candidate | Votes | % | ±% |
|---|---|---|---|---|
| Labour | Shaheena Haroon* | 1,558 | 63.7 | +18.7 |
| Conservative | Greg Keeley | 456 | 18.6 | −22.4 |
| Independent | Dave Bentley | 306 | 12.5 | N/A |
| Green | Paul Johnstone | 126 | 5.2 | −6.1 |
| Majority | | 1,102 | | |
| Rejected ballots | | 14 | | |
| Turnout | | 2,446 | 28 | |
| Registered electors | | | | |
| Labour hold | | Swing | | |

=== Sedgley ===
Sedgley (1)
| Party | Candidate | Votes | % | ±% |
|---|---|---|---|---|
| Labour | Debbie Quinn* | 1,896 | 70.1 | +8.0 |
| Conservative | Stefano Zuri | 591 | 21.8 | −3.8 |
| Green | Glyn Heath | 218 | 8.1 | −3.8 |
| Majority | | 1,305 | | |
| Rejected ballots | | 28 | | |
| Turnout | | 2,705 | 28 | |
| Registered electors | | | | |
| Labour hold | | Swing | | |

=== St. Marys ===
St. Marys (1)
| Party | Candidate | Votes | % | ±% |
|---|---|---|---|---|
| Labour Co-op | Sean Thorpe* | 1,852 | 62.6 | +19.4 |
| Conservative | Jihyun Park | 427 | 14.4 | +3.9 |
| Liberal Democrats | Ugonna Aiphodimma Edeoga | 426 | 14.4 | −13.8 |
| Green | Nick Hubble | 254 | 8.6 | −1.5 |
| Majority | | 1,425 | | |
| Rejected ballots | | 19 | | |
| Turnout | | 2,959 | 34 | |
| Registered electors | | | | |
| Labour Co-op hold | | Swing | | |

=== Tottington ===
Tottington (1)
| Party | Candidate | Votes | % | ±% |
|---|---|---|---|---|
| Conservative | Iain Gartside* | 1,219 | 40.5 | −3.3 |
| Labour | Sam Turner | 821 | 27.3 | +1.6 |
| Independent | Wendy Warrington | 765 | 25.4 | N/A |
| Green | Beth Dunkerley | 134 | 4.5 | −9.7 |
| Liberal Democrats | Cristina Tegolo | 71 | 2.4 | N/A |
| Majority | | 398 | | |
| Rejected ballots | | 10 | | |
| Turnout | | 3,010 | 38 | |
| Registered electors | | | | |
| Conservative hold | | Swing | | |

=== Unsworth ===
Unsworth (1)
| Party | Candidate | Votes | % | ±% |
|---|---|---|---|---|
| Labour | Tahir Rafiq* | 1,807 | 57.5 | +4.7 |
| Conservative | Ryan Johnson | 945 | 30.1 | −9.4 |
| Liberal Democrats | Michael Hankey | 198 | 6.3 | N/A |
| Green | Laura Thomas | 194 | 6.2 | N/A |
| Majority | | 862 | | |
| Rejected ballots | | 22 | | |
| Turnout | | 3,144 | 37 | |
| Registered electors | | | | |
| Labour hold | | Swing | | |

== Changes 2023–2024 ==
- James Mason, elected for Radcliffe First, left the party in January 2024 and was subsequently disqualified as a councillor in April 2024 for non-attendance.
