= 2019 Bury Metropolitan Borough Council election =

2019 local election in England

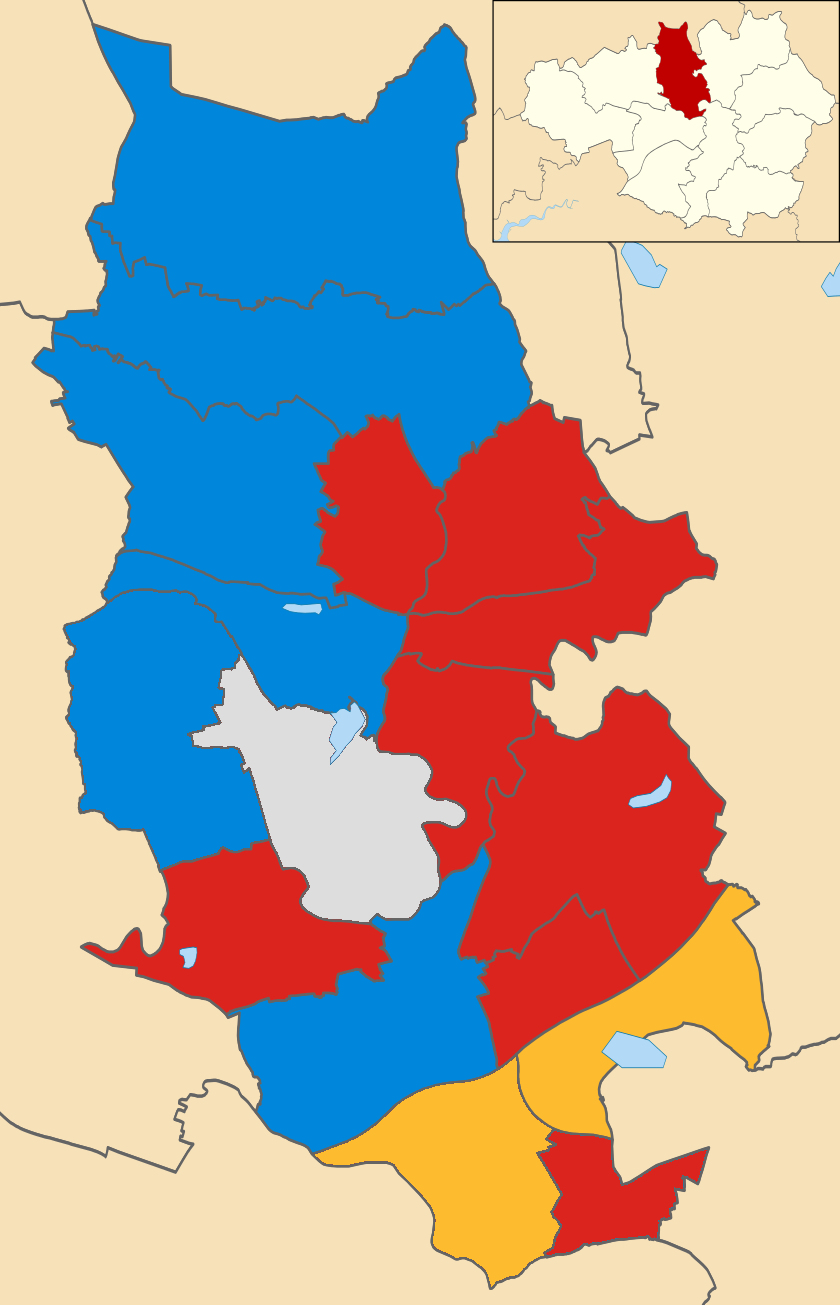
2019 local election results in Bury

The 2019 Bury Metropolitan Borough Council Election took place on 2 May 2019 to elect members of Bury Metropolitan Borough Council. This was on the same day as other local elections.

== Election result ==
Changes compared with 2018 election.

2019 Bury Metropolitan Borough Council election
Party	This election				Full council			This election		
Party	Candidates	Seats	Net	Seats %	Other	Total	Total %	Votes	Votes %	+/−
Labour	{{{candidates}}}	9	Steady	52.9	20	29	56.9	19,508	38.9	-9.3
Conservative	{{{candidates}}}	5	▼1	29.4	11	16	31.4	17,442	34.8	-3.0
Liberal Democrats	{{{candidates}}}	2	▲1	11.8	2	4	7.8	6,351	12.7	+3.0
Independent	{{{candidates}}}	1	▲1	5.9	1	2	3.9	1,851	3.7	+2.8
Green	{{{candidates}}}	0	Steady	0.0	0	0	0.0	4,370	8.7	+5.4
UKIP	{{{candidates}}}	0	Steady	0.0	0	0	0.0	354	0.7	New
English Democrat	{{{candidates}}}	0	Steady	0.0	0	0	0.0	288	0.6	+0.3

== Ward results ==
Candidates seeking re-election were last elected in 2015 and are denoted with an asterisk. Changes are compared to the 2018 results in that ward.

=== Besses ===
Besses
Party	Candidate	Votes	%	±%
Labour	Andrea Simpson	1,007	48.3	−11.4
Conservative	Jordan Lewis	433	20.8	−2.5
English Democrat	Stephen Morris	288	13.8	+6.7
Green	Jessie Georgia Smart	197	9.5	+4.5
Liberal Democrats	Dominic Bairstow Jackson	158	7.6	+2.7
Majority		574	27.6	
Turnout		2,083	25.4	
Registered electors		8,208		
Rejected ballots		21	1.0	
Labour hold		Swing		

=== Church ===
Church
Party	Candidate	Votes	%	±%
Conservative	Jackie Harris*	1,913	56.7	−1.9
Labour	Sam Turner	925	27.4	−8.4
Green	Nicole Paule Haydock	338	10.0	+4.4
Liberal Democrats	Lynda Arthur	198	5.9	New
Majority		988	29.3	
Turnout		3,374	40.2	
Registered electors		8,397		
Rejected ballots		50	1.5	
Conservative hold		Swing		

=== East ===
East
Party	Candidate	Votes	%	±%
Labour	Gavin McGill	1,418	63.6	+4.2
Conservative	Liam James Dean	428	19.2	−14.9
Green	Paul Anthony Petzer	261	11.7	+5.1
Liberal Democrats	Stephen Stokes	124	5.6	New
Majority		990	44.4	
Turnout		2,231	26.6	
Registered electors		8,377		
Rejected ballots		48	2.1	
Labour hold		Swing		

=== Elton ===
Elton
Party	Candidate	Votes	%	±%
Labour	Charlotte Morris	1,259	42.2	−8.6
Conservative	Michael Hankey*	1,243	41.6	−2.0
Green	Charlie Allen	351	11.8	+8.1
Liberal Democrats	Jacob Royde	133	4.5	+2.6
Majority		16	0.5	
Turnout		2,986	35.56	
Rejected ballots		52	1.7	
Labour gain from Conservative		Swing		

=== Holyrood ===
Holyrood
Party	Candidate	Votes	%	±%
Liberal Democrats	Maria Tegolo	1,995	56.1	+9.4
Labour	Chris Neville	1,009	28.4	−9.9
UKIP	Kevin McGill	196	5.5	New
Green	Peter Curati	179	5.0	+1.4
Conservative	Bernard Vincent	177	5.0	−6.4
Majority		986	27.7	
Turnout		3,556	41.6	
Registered electors		8,539		
Rejected ballots		9	0.3	
Liberal Democrats hold		Swing		

=== Moorside ===
Moorside
Party	Candidate	Votes	%	±%
Labour	Sarah Southworth*	1,198	47.1	−19.1
Conservative	Sohail Raja	829	32.6	+8.3
Green	Stefanie Jayne Moore	391	15.4	+10.8
Liberal Democrats	Gavin Warnes	123	4.8	New
Majority		369	14.5	
Turnout		2,571	28.7	
Registered electors		8,854		
Rejected ballots		50	1.9	
Labour hold		Swing		

No Independent candidate as previous (-4.9).

=== North Manor ===
North Manor
Party	Candidate	Votes	%	±%
Conservative	Khalid Hussain*	1,699	50.3	−11.0
Labour	Tom Pilkington	942	27.9	−3.9
Green	Mary Heath	456	13.5	+10.3
Liberal Democrats	Ewan Arthur	284	8.4	+4.7
Majority		757	22.4	
Turnout		3,381	42.1	
Registered electors		8,039		
Rejected ballots		47	1.4	
Conservative hold		Swing		

=== Pilkington Park ===
Pilkington Park
Party	Candidate	Votes	%	±%
Conservative	Robert Caserta*	1,482	49.6	−7.4
Labour	Eddy Redmond	951	31.8	−4.8
Liberal Democrats	Andrew Cross	202	6.8	+4.2
Green	Myriam Salama-Carr	193	6.5	+2.7
UKIP	Anthony Clough	158	5.3	New
Majority		531	17.8	
Turnout		2,986	39.9	
Registered electors		7,478		
Rejected ballots		11	0.4	
Conservative hold		Swing		

=== Radcliffe East ===
Radcliffe East
Party	Candidate	Votes	%	±%
Independent	James Mason	1,045	38.1	New
Labour	Evelyn Mary Doyle	979	35.7	−11.4
Conservative	Luis James McBriar	609	22.2	−7.0
Liberal Democrats	Stephen Thomas Lewis	110	4.0	−2.6
Majority		66	2.4	
Turnout		2,743	30.8	
Registered electors		8,902		
Rejected ballots		19	0.7	
Independent gain from Labour		Swing		

No Independent candidate as previous (-13.2).

=== Radcliffe North ===
Radcliffe North
Party	Candidate	Votes	%	±%
Conservative	Sam Hurst	1,507	48.6	−6.5
Labour	Jamie Walker*	1,171	37.8	−2.8
Green	John Philip Meara	301	9.7	New
Liberal Democrats	Rodney Rew	120	3.9	−0.4
Majority		336	10.8	
Turnout		3,099	35.8	
Registered electors		8,659		
Rejected ballots		27	0.9	
Conservative gain from Labour		Swing		

=== Radcliffe West ===
Radcliffe West
Party	Candidate	Votes	%	±%
Labour	Beth Mortenson	886	39.2	−21.3
Independent	Carol Ann Birchmore	806	35.7	New
Conservative	David Lewis	350	15.5	−9.5
Green	Andrew Truelove	152	6.7	−4.7
Liberal Democrats	Kamran Islam	65	2.9	−0.1
Majority		80	3.5	
Turnout		2,259	26.8	
Registered electors		8,438		
Rejected ballots		17	0.7	
Labour hold		Swing		

=== Ramsbottom ===
Ramsbottom
Party	Candidate	Votes	%	±%
Labour	Clair Ann Cummins	1,645	45.3	−6.4
Conservative	Gregg Dennis Fletcher	1,459	40.2	−4.7
Green	Louise Stephanie Bancroft	363	10.0	New
Liberal Democrats	David Henry Foss	160	4.4	+1.1
Majority		186	5.1	
Turnout		3,627	40.3	
Registered electors		9,011		
Rejected ballots		55	1.5	
Labour gain from Conservative		Swing		

=== Redvales ===
Redvales
Party	Candidate	Votes	%	±%
Labour	Clare Louise Walsh	1,511	47.2	−17.2
Conservative	Shahbaz Mahmood Arif	1,213	37.9	+11.5
Green	Paul Johnstone	349	10.9	+5.4
Liberal Democrats	Gareth Lloyd-Johnson	128	4.0	+0.3
Majority		298	9.3	
Turnout		3,201	35.4	
Registered electors		9,033		
Rejected ballots		41	1.3	
Labour hold		Swing		

=== Sedgley ===
Sedgley
Party	Candidate	Votes	%	±%
Labour	Richard Ian Gold	1,650	54.9	−5.3
Conservative	Daniel Kallmunzer	1,010	33.6	−0.1
Liberal Democrats	Elena Lenzi	347	11.5	+5.4
Majority		640	21.3	
Turnout		3,007	33.99	
Registered electors		8,846		
Rejected ballots		16	0.5	
Labour hold		Swing		

=== St. Mary's ===
St. Mary's
Party	Candidate	Votes	%	±%
Liberal Democrats	Michael Powell	1,964	56.7	+12.7
Labour	Noel Bayley*	1,022	29.5	−16.1
Conservative	Zadok Day	266	7.7	−2.7
Green	Emlyn Martin Begley	214	6.2	New
Majority		942	27.2	
Turnout		3,466	42.8	
Registered electors		8,105		
Rejected ballots		25	0.7	
Liberal Democrats gain from Labour		Swing		

=== Tottington ===
Tottington
Party	Candidate	Votes	%	±%
Conservative	Yvonne Wright*	1,729	58.2	+4.8
Labour	Anthony McCaul	764	25.7	−14.1
Green	Samantha Deas	354	11.9	New
Liberal Democrats	Andy Minty	125	4.2	+1.3
Majority		965	32.5	
Turnout		2,972	37.3	
Registered electors		7,959		
Rejected ballots		28	0.9	
Conservative hold		Swing		

=== Unsworth ===
Unsworth
Party	Candidate	Votes	%	±%
Labour	Joan Grimshaw*	1,171	44.2	+0.1
Conservative	Anton Slawycz	1,095	41.3	+6.2
Green	Glyn Harvey Heath	271	10.2	New
Liberal Democrats	Ugonna Edeoga	115	4.3	−16.5
Majority		76	2.9	
Turnout		2,652	36.3	
Registered electors		7,306		
Rejected ballots		34	1.3	
Labour hold		Swing		

== Changes 2019–2021 ==
=== By-elections ===
==== Radcliffe West ====
The by-election was triggered by the resignation of Labour councillor Rishi Shori, who stood down as council leader and as the ward's councillor to take up a role with Birmingham City Council.

Radcliffe West By-Election 29 August 2019
Party	Candidate	Votes	%	±%
Radcliffe First	Mike Smith	824	41.7	+41.7
Labour	Jamie Walker	708	35.8	−3.4
Conservative	Jordan Lewis	283	14.3	−1.2
Liberal Democrats	Kingsley Jones	113	5.7	+2.8
UKIP	Anthony Clough	50	2.5	+2.5
Majority		116	5.9	
Turnout		1,978		
Radcliffe First gain from Labour				

==== Church ====
The by-election was triggered by the death of Conservative councillor Susan Nuttall in September 2019. It was held on the same day as the 2019 United Kingdom general election.

Church By-Election 12 December 2019
Party	Candidate	Votes	%	±%
Conservative	Dene Vernon	3,317	55.9	−0.8
Labour	Sam Turner	2,172	36.6	+9.2
Green	Charlie Allen	235	4.0	−6.0
Liberal Democrats	Stephen Lewis	213	3.6	−2.3
Majority		1,145	19.3	
Turnout		5,937		
Conservative hold		Swing		
