= Shneur Odze =

English politician

- Born: Shneur Zalman Odze; 3 March 1981 (age 45)
- Known for: UKIP candidate in the 2017 Greater Manchester mayoral election
- Political party: Conservative (2002–2012)(2018-present); UK Independence Party (2014–2018)

Shneur Zalman Odze (born 3 March 1981) is an Orthodox Jewish rabbi and UK Independence Party (UKIP) politician.

== Political career ==
Odze was elected as a Conservative Party councillor for the New River ward on Hackney London Borough Council in 2002. He resigned from the council in 2004 when he moved to Salford. He was a Conservative candidate in Bury council elections in 2004 and 2006 (Sedgley ward) and then in the Salford City Council elections in 2007, in Kersal ward which had until then been a safe Labour ward with Conservatives a distant third, where he lost by 34 votes (1.35%), 2008 and 2010 . He stood for UKIP in the 2012 and 2014 Salford City Council election.

Odze was a UKIP candidate for the North West England in the European Election 2014. During the campaign, he declined to shake hands with female voters due to his religious beliefs, which prohibit physical contact with any woman other than his wife. One of the party's regional organisers resigned in protest.

In 2014 he organised a group of people including some Israelis to travel to Bradford in protest after George Galloway declared the city an "Israel-free zone".

Odze helped to set up the "Friends of Israel in UKIP", the logo of which featured a pound sign (the logo of UKIP at the time) in the centre of a star of David. When it was pointed out that linking Jews and money had unfortunate connotations, Odze said this was more oversight than conspiracy. He condemned the party's policy against kosher slaughter as "wrong".

He sought the UKIP nomination for the 2016 London mayoral election, but was unsuccessful. He was the UKIP candidate in the 2017 Greater Manchester mayoral election, where he came sixth with 1.9% of the vote. At a Manchester hustings he was criticised by Jane Brophy, the Liberal Democrat candidate because he refused to shake her hand as dictated by his religious beliefs. She said he should treat women and men equally.

In 2017 Odze burned a Christian evangelical Hebrew-English Bible which had been placed in a synagogue without permission on the eve of Passover. Odze initially denied that this event had taken place. Odze subsequently apologised following a Daily Mail article showing a Twitter post he had made which included a photograph of the book on fire.

He is said to be a close confidant of Nigel Farage and Paul Nuttall.

== Personal life ==
Odze's mother comes from Morocco, and his paternal grandfather, who fought in General Anders' Polish II Corps at Monte Cassino, where 55,000 Allied troops died, was from Poland. He was born and brought up in Hackney. He is married with four daughters and a son.
