= 2024 Bury Metropolitan Borough Council election =

2024 local government election in England

- 2 May 2024

17 out of 51 seats to Bury Metropolitan Borough Council 26 seats needed for a majority

| | Majority party | Minority party |
|---|---|---|
| Leader | Eamonn O'Brien | Russell Bernstein |
| Party | Labour | Conservative |
| Leader's seat | St Mary's | Pilkington Park |
| Last election | 31 seats, 46.3% | 11 seats, 29.2% |
| Seats before | 31 | 11 |
| Seats after | 32 | 10 |
| Seat change | ▲1 | ▼1 |
| Popular vote | 24,212 | 13,812 |
| Percentage | 45.4% | 25.9% |
| | Third party | Fourth party |
| Leader | Mike Smith | None |
| Party | Radcliffe First | Independent |
| Leader's seat | Radcliffe West |
| Last election | 8 seat, 7.8% | 1 seat, 3.8% |
| Seats before | 7 | 2 (Note: Including one vacant seat last held by James Mason, elected as Radcliffe First, but left the party in January 2024 to sit as an independent before being disqualified from the council for non-attendance in April 2024.) |
| Seats after | 8 | 1 |
| Seat change | Steady | Steady |
| Popular vote | 4,177 | 200 |
| Percentage | 7.8% | 0.4% |
- Winner of each seat at the 2024 Bury Metropolitan Borough Council election
Leader before election
Eamonn O'Brien
Labour
Leader after election
Eamonn O'Brien
Labour

The 2024 Bury Metropolitan Borough Council election was held on Thursday 2 May 2024, alongside the other local elections in the United Kingdom on the same day. One third of councillors - 17 out of 51 members - of Bury Metropolitan Borough Council were up for election. The council remained under Labour majority control.

== Summary ==
Prior to the election, the council was under Labour majority control. Local party Bury Independents contested the election for the first time, but did not win any seats. Labour gained a seat from the Conservatives to increase their majority on the council.

== Electoral process ==
The council generally elects its councillors in thirds, with a third being up for election every year for three years, with no election in the fourth year. The election was conducted using the first-past-the-post voting system, with each ward electing one councillor.

All registered electors (British, Irish, Commonwealth and European Union citizens) living in Bury aged 18 or over were entitled to vote in the election. People who lived at two addresses in different councils, such as university students with different term-time and holiday addresses, were entitled to be registered for and vote in elections in both local authorities. Voting in-person at polling stations took place from 07:00 to 22:00 on election day, and voters were able to apply for postal votes or proxy votes in advance of the election.

== Previous council composition ==
| After 2023 election | | Before 2024 election | | After 2024 election | |
| Party | Seats | Party | Seats | Party | Seats |
|---|---|---|---|---|---|
| Labour | 31 | Labour | 31 | Labour | 32 |
| Conservative | 11 | Conservative | 11 | Conservative | 10 |
| Radcliffe First | 8 | Radcliffe First | 7 | Radcliffe First | 8 |
| Independent | 1 | Independent | 2 | Independent | 1 |

Changes:

- February 2024: James Mason resigns from Radcliffe First and sits as an independent.
- April 2024: Bury Independents withdraw support from their Bury West candidate, Alan Bayfield, for social media conduct
- 22 February 2026: Luis McBriar (elected as a Conservative in 2024, in 2025 left the party to form the 'Together for Bury' group along with two other disaffected Conservatives) resigns as a Councillor upon taking a politically neutral role, triggering a by-election in Tottington Ward, which was held on 2 April 2026. Reform UK's George Martin won the by-election.

== Results ==
2024 Bury Metropolitan Borough Council election
| Party | This election | | | Full council | | | This election | | |
| Party | Seats | Net | Seats % | Other | Total | Total % | Votes | Votes % | +/− |
|---|---|---|---|---|---|---|---|---|---|
| Labour | 12 | ▲1 | 70.6 | 20 | 32 | 62.7 | 24,212 | 45.4 | -0.9 |
| Conservative | 2 | ▼1 | 11.8 | 8 | 10 | 19.6 | 13,812 | 25.9 | -3.3 |
| Radcliffe First | 3 | Steady | 17.6 | 4 | 7 | 13.7 | 4,177 | 7.8 | 0.0 |
| Independent | 0 | Steady | 0.0 | 2 | 2 | 3.9 | 200 | 0.4 | -3.4 |
| Bury Independents | 0 | Steady | 0.0 | 0 | 0 | 0.0 | 4,501 | 8.4 | New |
| Liberal Democrats | 0 | Steady | 0.0 | 0 | 0 | 0.0 | 2,045 | 3.8 | -1.7 |
| Workers Party | 0 | Steady | 0.0 | 0 | 0 | 0.0 | 1,562 | 2.9 | New |
| Green | 0 | Steady | 0.0 | 0 | 0 | 0.0 | 1,416 | 2.7 | -3.9 |
| Reform | 0 | Steady | 0.0 | 0 | 0 | 0.0 | 539 | 1.0 | +0.8 |
| English Democrat | 0 | Steady | 0.0 | 0 | 0 | 0.0 | 341 | 0.6 | +0.1 |

== Ward results ==
The results for each ward were:

=== Besses ===
Besses
| Party | Candidate | Votes | % | ±% |
|---|---|---|---|---|
| Labour | Miriam Rahimov | 1,528 | 63.1 | −6.0 |
| Bury Independents | Martyn John West | 390 | 16.1 | +6.6 |
| Conservative | Greg Keeley | 281 | 11.6 | +2.7 |
| English Democrat | Stephen Morris | 198 | 8.2 | +2.1 |
| Majority | | 1138 | 47.0 | |
| Turnout | | 2420 | 29 | |
| Labour hold | | Swing | | |

=== Bury East ===
Bury East
| Party | Candidate | Votes | % | ±% |
|---|---|---|---|---|
| Labour Co-op | Gavin Phillip McGill | 999 | 37.4 | −18.5 |
| Bury Independents | Fawad Sabir | 488 | 18.2 | new |
| Workers Party | Syed Maria Hashmi | 423 | 15.8 | new |
| Conservative | Jihyun Park | 337 | 12.6 | −15.9 |
| Reform | Kevin Cadwallader | 302 | 11.3 | +6.5 |
| Liberal Democrats | David Henry Foss | 104 | 3.9 | −0.2 |
| Majority | | 511 | 19.2 | |
| Turnout | | 2674 | 29 | |
| Labour hold | | Swing | | |

=== Bury West ===
Bury West
| Party | Candidate | Votes | % | ±% |
|---|---|---|---|---|
| Conservative | Dene John Vernon | 1,632 | 47.7 | −2.4 |
| Labour | Helen Jane Varnom | 1289 | 37.7 | +2.8 |
| Bury Independents | Alan Bayfield | 463 | 13.5 | new |
| Majority | | 343 | 10.0 | |
| Turnout | | 3419 | 40 | |
| Conservative hold | | Swing | | |

=== Elton ===
Elton
| Party | Candidate | Votes | % | ±% |
|---|---|---|---|---|
| Labour | Martin John Hayes | 1,606 | 45.5 | −2.9 |
| Conservative | Andrew Paul Luxton | 1456 | 41.3 | −3.0 |
| Bury Independents | Michael Hankey | 444 | 12.6 | new |
| Majority | | 150 | 4.3 | |
| Turnout | | 3528 | 39 | |
| Labour hold | | Swing | | |

=== Holyrood ===
Holyrood
| Party | Candidate | Votes | % | ±% |
|---|---|---|---|---|
| Labour | Imran Rasa Rizvi | 1,680 | 44.9 | −2.7 |
| Liberal Democrats | Steven David Wright | 1443 | 38.6 | −2.0 |
| Green | Peter Curati | 273 | 7.3 | +2.9 |
| Conservative | Geoffrey Baron | 176 | 4.7 | +0.2 |
| English Democrat | Valerie Morris | 143 | 3.8 | +0.9 |
| Majority | | 237 | 6.3 | |
| Turnout | | 3739 | 43 | |
| Labour hold | | Swing | | |

=== Moorside ===
Moorside
| Party | Candidate | Votes | % | ±% |
|---|---|---|---|---|
| Labour | Ciaron Michael Boles | 1,202 | 43.4 | −12.6 |
| Bury Independents | Aamer Yasin | 858 | 31.0 | new |
| Conservative | Ian Cameron Strachan | 678 | 24.5 | −2.8 |
| Majority | | 344 | 12.4 | |
| Turnout | | 2769 | 32 | |
| Labour hold | | Swing | | |

=== North Manor ===
North Manor
| Party | Candidate | Votes | % | ±% |
|---|---|---|---|---|
| Labour | John Damian Southworth | 1,844 | 45.5 | +5.2 |
| Conservative | Liam James Dean | 1802 | 44.5 | +2.0 |
| Green | Charlie Allen | 263 | 6.5 | −7.0 |
| Independent | Raymond Martin Solomon | 119 | 2.9 | new |
| Majority | | 42 | 1.0 | |
| Turnout | | 4053 | 50 | |
| Labour gain from Conservative | | Swing | | |

=== Pilkington Park ===
Pilkington Park
| Party | Candidate | Votes | % | ±% |
|---|---|---|---|---|
| Labour | Elizabeth Jayne Fitzgerald | 1,710 | 53.5 | +5.3 |
| Conservative | Anthony Rose | 1000 | 31.3 | −5.1 |
| Reform | Jeff Armstrong | 237 | 7.4 | new |
| Bury Independents | Mike Court | 142 | 4.4 | new |
| Independent | Shadman Zaman | 81 | 2.5 | −4.8 |
| Majority | | 710 | 22.2 | |
| Turnout | | 3194 | 41 | |
| Labour hold | | Swing | | |

=== Radcliffe East ===
Radcliffe East
| Party | Candidate | Votes | % | ±% |
|---|---|---|---|---|
| Radcliffe First | Ken Simpson | 1,390 | 59.7 | −0.5 |
| Labour | Rhyse Lewis Cathcart | 757 | 32.5 | +3.7 |
| Conservative | Mark John Gregory | 171 | 7.3 | −0.6 |
| Majority | | 633 | 27.2 | |
| Turnout | | 2329 | 27 | |
| Radcliffe First hold | | Swing | | |

=== Radcliffe North and Ainsworth ===
Radcliffe North and Ainsworth
| Party | Candidate | Votes | % | ±% |
|---|---|---|---|---|
| Radcliffe First | Andrea Booth | 1,467 | 42.5 | +5.7 |
| Conservative | Paul Cropper | 1186 | 34.3 | −4.4 |
| Labour | Sally-Ann McGill | 780 | 22.6 | +0.5 |
| Majority | | 281 | 8.2 | |
| Turnout | | 3453 | 36 | |
| Radcliffe First hold | | Swing | | |

=== Radcliffe West ===
Radcliffe West
| Party | Candidate | Votes | % | ±% |
|---|---|---|---|---|
| Radcliffe First | Des Duncalfe | 1,320 | 56.1 | −0.8 |
| Labour | Josh Harcup | 811 | 34.5 | +3.4 |
| Conservative | Emma Elizabeth Lee | 203 | 8.6 | −0.4 |
| Majority | | 509 | 21.6 | |
| Turnout | | 2351 | 28 | |
| Radcliffe First hold | | Swing | | |

=== Ramsbottom ===
Ramsbottom
| Party | Candidate | Votes | % | ±% |
|---|---|---|---|---|
| Labour | Tom Pilkington | 2,214 | 60.8 | +4.4 |
| Conservative | Adam Thomas Lewis | 1142 | 31.4 | −4.1 |
| Liberal Democrats | Martyn Bristow | 242 | 6.6 | +2.6 |
| Majority | | 1072 | 29.4 | |
| Turnout | | 3642 | 40 | |
| Labour hold | | Swing | | |

=== Redvales ===
Redvales
| Party | Candidate | Votes | % | ±% |
|---|---|---|---|---|
| Labour | Tamoor Tariq | 1,155 | 37.0 | −26.7 |
| Workers Party | Shabaz Imtiaz Shamim | 962 | 30.8 | new |
| Conservative | Mazhar Aslam | 410 | 13.1 | −5.5 |
| Green | Paul Johnstone | 378 | 12.1 | +6.9 |
| Bury Independents | Mirza Hamie | 184 | 5.9 | new |
| Majority | | 193 | 6.2 | |
| Turnout | | 3119 | 35 | |
| Labour hold | | Swing | | |

=== Sedgley ===
Sedgley
| Party | Candidate | Votes | % | ±% |
|---|---|---|---|---|
| Labour | Alan Quinn | 1,832 | 64.0 | −6.1 |
| Conservative | Jonathan Grosskopf | 709 | 24.8 | +3.0 |
| Liberal Democrats | Ewan James Arthur | 256 | 8.9 | new |
| Majority | | 1123 | 39.2 | |
| Turnout | | 2863 | 32 | |
| Labour hold | | Swing | | |

=== St Marys ===
St Marys
| Party | Candidate | Votes | % | ±% |
|---|---|---|---|---|
| Labour | Debra Green | 2,177 | 66.8 | +4.2 |
| Conservative | Artjoms Markovins | 523 | 16.1 | +1.7 |
| Green | Nick Hubble | 502 | 15.4 | +6.8 |
| Majority | | 1654 | 50.7 | |
| Turnout | | 3257 | 37 | |
| Labour hold | | Swing | | |

=== Tottington ===
Tottington
| Party | Candidate | Votes | % | ±% |
|---|---|---|---|---|
| Conservative | Luis James McBriar | 1,416 | 45.5 | +5.0 |
| Labour | Adnan Chaudhry | 904 | 29.0 | +1.7 |
| Bury Independents | Angie Sutcliffe | 772 | 24.8 | new |
| Majority | | 512 | 16.5 | |
| Turnout | | 3113 | 39 | |
| Conservative hold | | Swing | | |

=== Unsworth ===
Unsworth
| Party | Candidate | Votes | % | ±% |
|---|---|---|---|---|
| Labour | Jodie Kathleen Hook | 1,724 | 51.2 | −6.3 |
| Bury Independents | Steve Middleton | 760 | 22.6 | new |
| Conservative | Paul Davies | 690 | 20.5 | −9.6 |
| Workers Party | Iftikhar Ahmed | 177 | 5.3 | new |
| Majority | | 964 | 28.6 | |
| Turnout | | 3369 | 40 | |
| Labour hold | | Swing | | |

== By-elections ==
Tottington by-election, 2 April 2026
| Party | Candidate | Votes | % | ±% |
|---|---|---|---|---|
| Reform | George Martin | 929 | 39.5 | new |
| Conservative | Emma Elizabeth Lee | 627 | 26.7 | −18.8 |
| Labour | Drew Keanu Bell | 346 | 14.7 | −14.3 |
| Green | Chloe King | 257 | 10.9 | new |
| Together for Bury | Greg Keeley | 193 | 8.2 | new |
| Majority | | 302 | 12.8 | |
| Turnout | | 2352 | 31 | |
| Reform gain from Conservative | | Swing | | |

A by-election was held in Tottington ward on 2 April 2026 following the resignation of Luis McBriar.

== See also ==
- Bury Metropolitan Borough Council elections
