= 2004 Bury Metropolitan Borough Council election =

2004 local election in England

Results of the 2004 Bury Metropolitan Borough Council election

Elections to Bury Metropolitan Borough Council were held on 10 June 2004. The whole council was up for election with boundary changes since the last election in 2003. The number of councillors increased from 48 to 51, with the addition on North Manor Ward, as well as other boundary changes, therefore it is not possible to show seats gained and lost. The top 3 candidates in each ward were elected.

The Labour Party retained control of the council.

After the election, the composition of the council was:

- Labour 27
- Conservative 19
- Liberal Democrat 5

== Election result ==
Bury local election result 2004
Party	Seats	Gains	Losses	Net gain/loss	Seats %	Votes %	Votes	+/−
Labour	27			0		35.0	24,884	-5.3
Conservative	19			+2		37.0	26,215	-2.8
Liberal Democrats	5			+1		21.7	15,457	+2.9
BNP	0	0	0	0		3.2	2,235	+3.2
Independent	0	0	0	0		3.1	2,241	+2.9

== Ward results ==
Besses
Party	Candidate	Votes	%	±%
Labour	Derek Boden	1,724	22.6	
Labour	Alan Matthews	1,514	19.9	
Labour	Ken Audin	1,424	18.7	
Conservative	Mark Roberts	830	10.9	
Conservative	Julian Kershner	783	10.3	
Liberal Democrats	Winnifred Rohmann	681	8.9	
Conservative	Chava Odze	657	8.6	
Turnout				

Church
Party	Candidate	Votes	%	±%
Conservative	Roy Walker	2,643	22.4	
Conservative	Jack Walton	2,161	18.3	
Conservative	Robert Bibby	1,922	16.3	
Labour	Andrew McAnulty	1,357	11.5	
Labour	Leslie Jones	1,182	10.0	
Labour	Benjamin Shatliff	885	7.5	
BNP	Thomas Rosser	817	6.9	
Liberal Democrats	Michael Bell	815	6.9	
Turnout				

East
Party	Candidate	Votes	%	±%
Labour	John Byrne	1,597	16.5	
Labour	Mike Connolly	1,582	16.4	
Labour	Trevor Holt	1,538	15.9	
Conservative	Azmat Husain	1,115	11.5	
Liberal Democrats	Jeanette Tonge	1,083	11.2	
Conservative	Nawaz Khan	1,051	10.9	
Conservative	Shahid Haider	757	7.8	
Independent	Anthony Hill	489	5.1	
Independent	Thomas Canham	441	4.6	
Turnout				

Elton
Party	Candidate	Votes	%	±%
Conservative	Yvonne Creswell	1,639	16.7	
Conservative	Denise Bigg	1,519	15.5	
Labour	John Costello	1,468	15.0	
Conservative	Michael Hankey	1,447	14.7	
Labour	Evelyn Holt	1,317	13.4	
Labour	Ray Watts	1,274	13.0	
Liberal Democrats	Yvonne Eagle	717	7.3	
Independent	Shaun Fitzsimon	423	4.3	
Turnout				

Holyrood
Party	Candidate	Votes	%	±%
Liberal Democrats	Victor D'Albert	2,114	19.6	
Liberal Democrats	Wilf Davison	1,994	18.5	
Liberal Democrats	Tim Pickstone	1,980	18.4	
Labour	Eve Sandler	891	8.3	
Labour	Darrell Johnson	873	8.1	
Labour	Lillian Johnston	867	8.1	
Conservative	Sheila Blaby	721	6.7	
Conservative	Marilyn Vincent	688	6.4	
Conservative	Jeanette Chrystal	625	5.8	
Turnout				

Moorside
Party	Candidate	Votes	%	±%
Labour	Dot Cassidy	1,608	15.9	
Labour	Keith Rothwell	1,357	13.4	
Labour	Warren Flood	1,324	13.1	
Conservative	Peter Ashworth	1,195	11.8	
Conservative	Trevor Jones	1,175	11.6	
Conservative	Beverley Sullivan	1,141	11.3	
Liberal Democrats	Victor Hagan	794	7.8	
Liberal Democrats	James Eagle	791	7.8	
Liberal Democrats	Paul Jenkins	738	7.3	
Turnout				

North Manor
Party	Candidate	Votes	%	±%
Conservative	Dorothy Gunther	3,075	25.1	
Conservative	David Higgin	2,877	23.5	
Conservative	James Taylor	2,459	20.1	
Labour	Peter Bury	1,099	9.0	
Labour	Ian Hargreaves	1,043	8.5	
Liberal Democrats	Robert Sloss	931	7.6	
Labour	Zia Ullah	740	6.0	
Turnout				

Pilkington Park
Party	Candidate	Votes	%	±%
Conservative	Michelle Wiseman	2,208	21.7	
Conservative	Peter Redstone	2,012	19.8	
Conservative	Bernie Vincent	1,800	17.7	
Labour	Paul Nesbit	1,339	13.2	
Labour	Alan Quinn	1,045	10.3	
Labour	Elliot Moss	1,025	10.1	
Liberal Democrats	Lynn Molloy	736	7.2	
Turnout				

Radcliffe East
Party	Candidate	Votes	%	±%
Labour	Lyndsey Campbell	1,626	18.7	
Labour	Siobhan Costello	1,355	15.6	
Labour	Steve Perkins	1,299	15.0	
Conservative	Jeffrey McGilvray	1,115	12.9	
Conservative	Eric Margieson	1,026	11.8	
Liberal Democrats	Peter Staley	769	8.9	
BNP	Janet Lees	755	8.7	
Conservative	Alison Roberts	725	8.4	
Turnout				

Radcliffe North
Party	Candidate	Votes	%	±%
Labour	Tim Chamberlain	1,827	16.9	
Labour	Barry Briggs	1,788	16.6	
Labour	Sharron Briggs	1,740	16.1	
Conservative	Alan Bigg	1,574	14.6	
Conservative	Stuart Penketh	1,427	13.2	
Conservative	Anthony Sprason	1,283	11.9	
Liberal Democrats	Gaynor Clarkson	768	7.1	
Independent	Bernadette Hargreaves	380	3.5	
Turnout				

Radcliffe West
Party	Candidate	Votes	%	±%
Labour	Tony Isherwood	1,652	20.9	
Labour	Anthony Cummings	1,601	20.3	
Labour	Wayne Campbell	1,562	19.8	
Conservative	Kathleen Armour	852	10.8	
Conservative	Roger Thompson	842	10.7	
Conservative	Ian Bevan	821	10.4	
Liberal Democrats	Caroline Gardner	561	7.1	
Turnout				

Ramsbottom
Party	Candidate	Votes	%	±%
Conservative	Barry Theckston	2,329	21.7	
Conservative	Sheila Magnall	2,106	19.6	
Conservative	Richard Nuttall	1,813	16.9	
Labour	Jane Lewis	1,406	13.1	
Labour	Nicole Ivanoff	1,147	10.7	
Labour	Michael Rae	1,127	10.5	
Liberal Democrats	Fiona Davison	815	7.6	
Turnout				

Redvales
Party	Candidate	Votes	%	±%
Labour	Susan Southworth	1,503	16.6	
Labour	John Smith	1,410	15.6	
Conservative	Khalid Hussain	1,178	13.0	
Conservative	Iona Worthington	1,156	12.8	
Labour	Farook Chaudhry	1,142	12.6	
Conservative	Ijaz Ahmed	1,003	11.1	
Liberal Democrats	Bill Brison	986	10.9	
Independent	Debbie Pierce	652	7.2	
Turnout				

St Mary's
Party	Candidate	Votes	%	±%
Labour	Margaret Gibb	1,597	15.0	
Labour	Keith Grime	1,550	14.6	
Labour	Steve Treadgold	1,381	13.0	
Conservative	Anthony Barlow	1,225	11.5	
Conservative	David Green	1,171	11.0	
Conservative	Denise Ormrod	1,141	10.8	
Liberal Democrats	Mary D'Albert	910	8.6	
Liberal Democrats	Maureen Davison	905	8.5	
Liberal Democrats	Michael Halsall	726	6.8	
Turnout				

Sedgley
Party	Candidate	Votes	%	±%
Liberal Democrats	Ann Garner	1,692	13.2	
Labour	Gill Campbell	1,543	12.1	
Liberal Democrats	Andrew Garner	1,542	12.1	
Labour	Catherine Evans	1,478	11.6	
Labour	Peter Timperley	1,471	11.5	
Liberal Democrats	Donal O'Hanlon	1,465	11.5	
Conservative	Neville Singer	1,260	9.9	
Conservative	Henry Kessler	1,229	9.6	
Conservative	Shneur Odze	1,092	8.5	
Turnout				

Tottington
Party	Candidate	Votes	%	±%
Conservative	Roger Brown	1,796	19.5	
Conservative	Tvonne Wright	1,563	16.6	
Conservative	Iain Garside	1,479	16.0	
Labour	Simon Carter	1,111	12.0	
Labour	Vera McClung	1,044	11.3	
Labour	Victor McClung	980	10.6	
BNP	Stewart Clough	663	7.2	
Liberal Democrats	Emma Davison	580	6.3	
Turnout				

Unsworth
Party	Candidate	Votes	%	±%
Conservative	Sam Cohen	1,560	16.8	
Labour	Gordon Sharkey	1,536	16.5	
Labour	Joan Grimshaw	1,418	15.3	
Labour	Stella Smith	1,335	14.4	
Conservative	Marilyn Green	1,307	14.1	
Conservative	Jonathan Grosskopf	1,231	13.3	
Liberal Democrats	Geoffrey Young	505	5.4	
Independent	Alan Garman	435	4.6	
Independent	Maurice Konyk	95	1.0	
Turnout				
