= 2006 Bury Metropolitan Borough Council election =

- 4 May 2006

17 of the 51 seats on Bury Metropolitan Borough Council 26 seats needed for a majority
	First party	Second party	Third party
Party	Conservative	Labour	Liberal Democrats
Seats won	9	5	3
Seats after	22	23	6
Seat change	▲3	▼4	▲1
Popular vote	21,619	17,337	11,072
Percentage	42.2%	33.8%	21.6%
Swing	▲5.2%	▼1.2%	▼0.1%
- Labour in red, Conservatives in blue and Liberal Democrats in orange.
Council control before election
Labour
Council control after election
No overall control

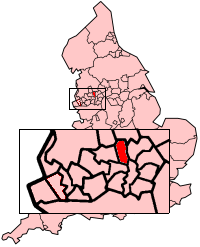
The Metropolitan Borough of Bury shown within England.

Elections to Bury Metropolitan Borough Council were held on 4 May 2006. One third of the council was up for election, and the Labour Party lost control of the council.

After the election, the composition of the council was:

- Labour 23
- Conservative 22
- Liberal Democrat 6

== Election result ==
Bury local election result 2006
Party	Seats	Gains	Losses	Net gain/loss	Seats %	Votes %	Votes	+/−
Labour	5	1	5	-4		33.8	17,337	-1.2
Conservative	9	4	1	+3		42.2	21,619	+5.2
Liberal Democrats	3	1	0	+1		21.6	11,072	-0.1
Independent	0	0	0	0	0	2.5	1,259	-0.6

== Ward results ==
Besses
Party	Candidate	Votes	%	±%
Labour	Ken Audin	1,085	47.5	−5.8
Conservative	Jonathan Grosskopf	597	26.1	+0.4
Liberal Democrats	Mary D'Albert	396	17.3	−3.8
Independent	Lucy Cohn	208	9.1	+9.1
Majority		488	21.3	
Turnout		2,286		
Labour hold		Swing		

Church
Party	Candidate	Votes	%	±%
Conservative	Robert Bibby	2,048	57.8	+10.9
Labour	Benjamin Shatliff	847	23.9	−0.2
Liberal Democrats	Paul Jenkins	649	18.3	+3.8
Majority		1,201	38.9	
Turnout		3,544		
Conservative hold		Swing		

East
Party	Candidate	Votes	%	±%
Labour	Trevor Holt	1,259	52.9	+15.6
Conservative	Azmat Husain	702	29.5	+3.5
Liberal Democrats	Ewan Arthur	597	18.6	−6.7
Majority		557	23.4	
Turnout		2,382		
Labour hold		Swing		

Elton
Party	Candidate	Votes	%	±%
Conservative	Michael Hankey	1,533	47.7	+9.1
Labour	Stella Smith	1,083	33.7	−0.9
Liberal Democrats	Ewan Arthur	597	18.6	+1.9
Majority		450	14.0	
Turnout		3,213		
Conservative gain from Labour		Swing		

Holyrood
Party	Candidate	Votes	%	±%
Liberal Democrats	Tim Pickstone	1,576	52.0	−4.7
Conservative	Marilyn Vincent	757	25.0	+5.6
Labour	Suzanne Johnston	699	23.1	−0.8
Majority		819	27.0	
Turnout		3,032		
Liberal Democrats hold		Swing		

Moorside
Party	Candidate	Votes	%	±%
Conservative	Peter Ashworth	1,129	40.2	+7.0
Labour	Warren Flood	995	35.4	−9.3
Liberal Democrats	Victor Hagan	686	24.4	+2.3
Majority		134	4.8	
Turnout		2,810		
Conservative gain from Labour		Swing		

North Manor
Party	Candidate	Votes	%	±%
Conservative	James Taylor	2,350	61.9	+1.7
Liberal Democrats	Robert Sloss	741	19.5	+1.3
Labour	Francis Shatliff	706	18.6	−2.9
Majority		1,609	42.4	
Turnout		3,797		
Conservative hold		Swing		

Pilkington Park
Party	Candidate	Votes	%	±%
Conservative	Bernard Vincent	1,760	61.7	+10.1
Labour	Alan Quinn	840	29.5	−1.8
Liberal Democrats	Mohammed Mustafa	251	8.8	−8.4
Majority		920	32.3	
Turnout		2,851		
Conservative hold		Swing		

Radcliffe East
Party	Candidate	Votes	%	±%
Conservative	Catherine Berry	1,029	38.8	+12.7
Labour	Steve Perkins	963	36.3	−1.8
Liberal Democrats	Michael Halsall	460	17.4	−0.6
Independent	Paul Clarke	199	7.5	+7.5
Majority		66	2.5	
Turnout		2,651		
Conservative gain from Labour		Swing		

Radcliffe North
Party	Candidate	Votes	%	±%
Labour	Sharron Briggs	1,431	42.2	+2.0
Conservative	Stuart Penketh	1,416	41.7	+7.1
Liberal Democrats	Maureen Davison	367	10.8	−6.1
Independent	Matthew Randall	180	5.3	−3.1
Majority		15	0.4	
Turnout		3,394		
Labour hold		Swing		

Radcliffe West
Party	Candidate	Votes	%	±%
Labour	Wayne Campbell	1,231	54.9	+1.0
Conservative	Alan Bigg	709	31.6	+3.8
Independent	Deborah Fallon	301	13.4	+13.4
Majority		522	23.3	
Turnout		2,241		
Labour hold		Swing		

Ramsbottom
Party	Candidate	Votes	%	±%
Conservative	Diane Ashworth	1,759	56.3	+5.1
Labour	Valerie Robinson	939	30.0	−0.9
Liberal Democrats	Fiona Davison	427	13.7	−4.2
Majority		820	26.2	
Turnout		3,125		
Conservative hold		Swing		

Redvales
Party	Candidate	Votes	%	±%
Labour	Farook Chaudhry	1,178	37.5	+2.7
Conservative	Khalid Hussain	1,127	35.8	+8.5
Liberal Democrats	Bill Brison	840	26.7	+3.9
Majority		51	1.6	
Turnout		3,145		
Labour gain from Conservative		Swing		

St Mary's
Party	Candidate	Votes	%	±%
Liberal Democrats	Donal O'Hanlon	1,333	42.0	+17.6
Labour	Steve Treadgold	896	28.2	−14.6
Conservative	Denise Ormrod	727	22.9	−9.9
Independent	Andrew Duff	217	6.8	+6.8
Majority		437	13.8	
Turnout		3,173		
Liberal Democrats gain from Labour		Swing		

Sedgley
Party	Candidate	Votes	%	±%
Liberal Democrats	Andrew Garner	1,478	39.1	+1.5
Labour	Peter Timperley	1,224	32.4	−1.9
Conservative	Shneur Odze	1,075	28.5	+0.5
Majority		254	6.7	
Turnout		3,777		
Liberal Democrats hold		Swing		

Tottington
Party	Candidate	Votes	%	±%
Conservative	Iain Garside	1,590	57.2	+13.9
Labour	Jane Lewis	711	25.6	−1.2
Liberal Democrats	David Foss	478	17.2	+3.2
Majority		879	31.6	
Turnout		2,779		
Conservative hold		Swing		

Unsworth
Party	Candidate	Votes	%	±%
Conservative	Beverley Sullivan	1,311	42.5	+2.5
Labour	Joan Grimshaw	1,250	40.5	+1.1
Liberal Democrats	Geoffrey Young	372	12.1	−0.9
Independent	Paul Gerrard	154	5.0	−2.6
Majority		61	2.0	
Turnout		3,087		
Conservative gain from Labour		Swing		
