= 2014 Bury Metropolitan Borough Council election =

2014 UK local government election

Results of the 2014 Bury Metropolitan Borough Council election

Elections to Bury Council were held on 22 May 2014, along with the European Parliament elections, 2014. One third of the council was up for election, with each successful candidate to serve a four-year term of office, expiring in 2018. The Labour Party retained control of the Council.

17 seats were contested. The Labour Party won 12 seats, the Conservatives won 4 seats, and the Liberal Democrats won 1 seat.

After the election, the total composition of the council was as follows:

- Labour 38
- Conservative 11
- Liberal Democrats 1
- Independent (politician) 1

== Election result ==
Bury local election result 2014
Party	Seats	Gains	Losses	Net gain/loss	Seats %	Votes %	Votes	+/−
Labour	12	3	0	+3		42.0	22,832	-9.0
Conservative	4	0	2	-2		32.2	17,504	+3.6
UKIP	0	0	0			10.8	5,891	+2.0
Liberal Democrats	1	0	1	-1		8.0	4,340	+1.3
Green	0	0	0	0	0	6.0	3,260	+4.9
English Democrat	0	0	0	0	0	0.9	514	+0.2

== Ward results ==
Besses
Party	Candidate	Votes	%	±%
Labour	Mary Whitby	1,313	52.4	−9.4
Conservative	Zadok Day	479	19.1	+4.2
English Democrat	Stephen Morris	412	16.4	+1.1
Green	Larissa Heath	172	6.9	+6.9
Liberal Democrats	Steve Middleton	127	5.1	−2.5
Majority		834	33.3	−12.2
Turnout		2,503	30.5	+1.9
Labour hold		Swing		

Church
Party	Candidate	Votes	%	±%
Conservative	Susan Nuttall	1,944	54.4	+3.4
Labour	Andrew McNaulty	1,216	34.0	+0.1
Green	Patrick Neill	309	8.6	+8.6
Liberal Democrats	Ann Garner	105	2.9	−0.8
Majority		728	20.4	+3.3
Turnout		3,574	42.6	+3.7
Conservative hold		Swing		

East
Party	Candidate	Votes	%	±%
Labour	Trevor Holt	1,494	55.4	−1.7
UKIP	Shaf Mahmood	682	25.3	+2.7
Conservative	Gregory Keeley	384	14.2	−5.8
Green	Eva Stewart	137	5.1	+5.1
Majority		812	30.1	−4.4
Turnout		2,697	33.2	+2.3
Labour hold		Swing		

Elton
Party	Candidate	Votes	%	±%
Labour	Sarah Kerrison	1,153	36.0	−9.2
Conservative	Michael Hankey	1,075	33.5	−2.2
UKIP	Graeme Kerby	726	22.6	+7.4
Green	Julie Southworth	159	4.9	+4.9
Liberal Democrats	Andrew Garner	93	2.9	−0.7
Majority		78	2.4	−7.1
Turnout		3,206	37.1	+3.7
Labour gain from Conservative		Swing		

Holyrood
Party	Candidate	Votes	%	±%
Liberal Democrats	Timothy Pickstone	1,800	50.4	+9.5
Labour	Catherine Preston	1,458	40.1	−5.3
Conservative	Zain Shah	315	8.8	+1.0
Majority		342	9.7	
Turnout		3,573	41.7	+4.7
Liberal Democrats hold		Swing		

Moorside
Party	Candidate	Votes	%	±%
Labour	Sandra Walmsley	1,495	52.0	−13.2
UKIP	Victor Hagan	756	26.3	+11.7
Conservative	Nabila Afilal	469	16.3	+0.2
Green	Anne Beckett	155	5.4	+5.4
Majority		739	25.7	−23.4
Turnout		2,875	32.1	+3.9
Labour hold		Swing		

North Manor
Party	Candidate	Votes	%	±%
Conservative	James Daly	1,781	50.3	−6.3
Labour	Steven Treadgold	816	23.1	−4.1
UKIP	Tanya Kay	583	16.5	+16.5
Green	Mary Heath	221	6.2	−4.5
Liberal Democrats	Ewan Arthur	137	3.9	−1.4
Majority		965	27.3	−2.1
Turnout		3,538	43.8	+3.1
Conservative hold		Swing		

Pilkington Park
Party	Candidate	Votes	%	±%
Labour	John Mallon	1,168	39.9	−6.5
Conservative	Bernie Vincent	1,149	39.2	−7.2
UKIP	John Parkinson	392	13.4	+13.4
Green	Peter Curati	118	4.0	+4.0
Liberal Democrats	Wilfred Davison	102	3.5	−1.3
Majority		19	0.7	
Turnout		2,929	38.7	+4.0
Labour gain from Conservative		Swing		

Radcliffe East
Party	Candidate	Votes	%	±%
Labour	Nick Parnell	1,299	51.5	−7.6
Conservative	Samantha Davies	763	30.2	+9.2
Green	Nicole Haydock	368	14.6	+14.6
Liberal Democrats	Joanne O'Hanlon	93	3.7	+0.2
Majority		536	21.2	−16.9
Turnout		2,523	30.0	+2.3
Labour hold		Swing		

Radcliffe North
Party	Candidate	Votes	%	±%
Labour	Jane Lewis	1,480	49.1	−2.3
Conservative	Carl Curran	1,005	33.3	−0.8
Green	John Southworth	361	12.0	+12.0
Liberal Democrats	Rod Rew	168	5.8	+3.0
Majority		475	15.7	−1.6
Turnout		3,014	34.8	−0.4
Labour hold		Swing		

Radcliffe West
Party	Candidate	Votes	%	±%
Labour	Rishi Shori	1,361	58.0	−11.3
Conservative	Katy Rothwell	619	26.4	+11.3
Green	Stephen Dillon	303	12.9	+12.9
Liberal Democrats	Kamran Islam	62	2.6	−0.2
Majority		742	31.6	−22.6
Turnout		2,345	27.7	+2.2
Labour hold		Swing		

Ramsbottom
Party	Candidate	Votes	%	±%
Conservative	Ian Bevan	1,710	47.0	+8.9
Labour	Sarah Southworth	1,206	33.1	−16.1
UKIP	David Barker	574	15.8	+6.6
Green	Glynn Heath	115	3.2	+3.2
Liberal Democrats	Mary D'Albert	33	0.9	−2.3
Majority		504	13.8	
Turnout		3,638	40.5	+3.8
Conservative hold		Swing		

Redvales
Party	Candidate	Votes	%	±%
Labour	Tamoor Tariq	1,691	51.1	−6.0
UKIP	Mike Harling	820	24.8	+8.5
Conservative	Luis McBriar	521	15.7	−4.7
Green	Bill Brison	168	5.1	+5.1
Liberal Democrats	Gareth Lloyd-Johnson	107	3.2	−2.5
Majority		871	26.3	−13.4
Turnout		3,307	37.8	+4.7
Labour hold		Swing		

Sedgley
Party	Candidate	Votes	%	±%
Labour	Alan Quinn	1,903	57.7	−2.6
Conservative	David Lewis	750	22.7	+4.5
Liberal Democrats	Steve Wright	340	10.3	−10.2
Green	Kamila Laing	307	9.3	+9.3
Majority		1,153	34.9	−5.0
Turnout		3,300	38.4	−4.8
Labour hold		Swing		

St. Mary's
Party	Candidate	Votes	%	±%
Labour	Eamonn O'Brien	1,381	43.9	−3.1
Liberal Democrats	Donal O'Hanlon	1008	32.0	−2.0
Conservative	Denise Ormrod	500	15.9	+4.3
Green	Paul Deaville	258	8.2	+1.2
Majority		373	11.8	−1.2
Turnout		3,147	39.1	+4.8
Labour gain from Liberal Democrats		Swing		

Tottington
Party	Candidate	Votes	%	±%
Conservative	Iain Gartside	1,295	41.5	+4.0
Labour	Judith Kelly	1,019	32.7	−9.5
UKIP	Walter Southworth	605	19.4	+7.7
Green	Zarrin Shannon	109	3.5	+3.5
Liberal Democrats	David Foss	88	2.8	−2.4
Majority		276	8.8	
Turnout		3,116	39.4	+7.6
Conservative hold		Swing		

Unsworth
Party	Candidate	Votes	%	±%
Labour	Paul Adams	1,379	45.1	−15.3
UKIP	Steve Evans	753	24.6	+14.5
Conservative	Richard Cohen	745	23.4	−2.8
English Democrat	Valerie Morris	102	3.3	+3.3
Liberal Democrats	Katriona Middleton	77	2.5	−0.3
Majority		626	20.5	−13.7
Turnout		3,056	39.4	+2.1
Labour hold		Swing		
