= 1999 Bury Metropolitan Borough Council election =

1999 UK local government election

Elections to Bury Council were held on 6 May 1999. One third of the council was up for election and the Labour Party kept overall control of the council. Overall turnout was 28.14%.

After the election, the composition of the council was:

- Labour 36
- Conservative 8
- Liberal Democrat 3
- Environment and Wildlife 1

== Election result ==
Bury local election result 1999
Party	Seats	Gains	Losses	Net gain/loss	Seats %	Votes %	Votes	+/−
Labour	12	0	2	-2	75.0	48.7	19,197	-3.4%
Conservative	3	2	0	+2	18.8	32.8	12,912	-1.1%
Liberal Democrats	1	0	0	0	6.3	13.9	5,480	+0.8%
Environment and Wildlife	0	0	0	0	0	3.9	1,533	+3.2%
Independent	0	0	0	0	0	0.7	283	+0.5%

== Ward results ==
Besses
Party	Candidate	Votes	%	±%
Labour	Derek Boden	974	67.4	−3.2
Conservative	Mark Roberts	319	22.1	+2.9
Liberal Democrats	Ivy Hooley	153	10.6	+0.4
Majority		655	45.3	−6.1
Turnout		1,446	21.5	+1.0
Labour hold		Swing		

Church
Party	Candidate	Votes	%	±%
Conservative	Robert Bibby	1,514	47.5	+0.7
Labour	Stella Smith	1,262	39.6	−5.5
Environment and Wildlife	Michael Wellock	413	13.0	+13.0
Majority		252	7.9	+6.2
Turnout		3,189	35.9	+0.6
Conservative gain from Labour		Swing		

East
Party	Candidate	Votes	%	±%
Labour	Trevor Holt	1,211	72.9	−6.2
Conservative	Roger Thompson	305	18.4	−2.5
Liberal Democrats	Janet Turner	146	8.8	+8.8
Majority		906	54.5	−3.7
Turnout		1,662	21.5	−0.5
Labour hold		Swing		

Elton
Party	Candidate	Votes	%	±%
Labour	Raymond Watts	1,192	47.2	−3.7
Conservative	Geoffrey White	885	35.0	−3.1
Environment and Wildlife	Glyn Heath	232	9.2	+9.2
Liberal Democrats	Robert Sloss	216	8.6	−2.5
Majority		307	12.2	−0.6
Turnout		2,525	27.2	+0.5
Labour hold		Swing		

Holyrood
Party	Candidate	Votes	%	±%
Liberal Democrats	Victor D'Albert	1,466	58.7	+2.2
Labour	Mary Whitby	693	27.7	−2.6
Conservative	Kevin Laughton	339	13.6	+0.4
Majority		773	31.0	+4.8
Turnout		2,498	30.4	+1.4
Liberal Democrats hold		Swing		

Moorside
Party	Candidate	Votes	%	±%
Labour	Winstone Ramsey	1,221	50.1	−0.2
Conservative	Norman Hamer	926	38.0	−4.2
Environment and Wildlife	Paul Dixon	156	6.4	+6.4
Liberal Democrats	Winifred Rohmann	134	5.5	−1.9
Majority		295	12.1	+4.0
Turnout		2,437	29.5	+0.2
Labour hold		Swing		

Pilkington Park
Party	Candidate	Votes	%	±%
Labour	Pamela Walker	1,013	49.8	−3.9
Conservative	Cecilia Aaron	853	41.9	+3.1
Liberal Democrats	Nigel Bird	168	8.3	+0.7
Majority		160	7.9	−7.0
Turnout		2,034	25.3	+0.8
Labour hold		Swing		

Radcliffe Central
Party	Candidate	Votes	%	±%
Labour	Anthony Isherwood	1,601	61.5	−7.5
Liberal Democrats	Michael Halsall	684	26.3	+14.5
Conservative	Alan Bigg	320	12.3	−4.1
Majority		917	25.2	−27.4
Turnout		2,605	29.8	+4.4
Labour hold		Swing		

Radcliffe North
Party	Candidate	Votes	%	±%
Labour	Edward Briggs	1,505	50.1	+0.4
Conservative	Denise Bigg	1,096	36.5	+1.2
Environment and Wildlife	David Bentley	242	8.1	−1.0
Liberal Democrats	Gillian Duffy	162	5.4	−0.5
Majority		409	13.6	−0.8
Turnout		3,005	28.5	+1.2
Labour hold		Swing		

Radcliffe South
Party	Candidate	Votes	%	±%
Labour	Anthony Watmough	1,015	54.2	−1.0
Conservative	Peter Wright	668	35.6	−0.9
Liberal Democrats	Theodor Tymczyna	191	10.2	+1.9
Majority		347	18.6	−0.1
Turnout		1,874	23.5	+4.8
Labour hold		Swing		

Ramsbottom
Party	Candidate	Votes	%	±%
Conservative	Barry Theckston	1,595	43.8	−4.9
Labour	Anne Beckett	1,563	42.9	+2.6
Environment and Wildlife	Angela Graham	256	7.0	+7.0
Liberal Democrats	David Foss	230	6.3	−4.8
Majority		32	0.9	−7.5
Turnout		3,644	32.8	+4.0
Conservative gain from Labour		Swing		

Redvales
Party	Candidate	Votes	%	±%
Labour	John Smith	1,436	66.9	+0.3
Conservative	Christopher Hall	428	19.9	−2.1
Independent	Arthur Withington	283	13.2	+13.2
Majority		1,008	47.0	+2.4
Turnout		2,147	26.7	+0.7
Labour hold		Swing		

St Mary's
Party	Candidate	Votes	%	±%
Labour	Brendon Hope	1,266	52.1	−5.0
Conservative	Neville Singer	652	26.8	−2.1
Liberal Democrats	Mary D'Albert	513	21.1	+7.1
Majority		614	25.3	−2.9
Turnout		2,431	27.0	+2.2
Labour hold		Swing		

Sedgley
Party	Candidate	Votes	%	±%
Labour	Gillian Campbell	1,128	45.1	−7.7
Liberal Democrats	Timothy Pickstone	968	38.7	+14.8
Conservative	Bernard Vincent	406	16.2	−7.1
Majority		160	6.4	−22.5
Turnout		2,502	30.5	+2.8
Labour hold		Swing		

Tottington
Party	Candidate	Votes	%	±%
Conservative	William Johnson	1,795	59.8	+6.1
Labour	Elizabeth Melia	911	30.4	−4.9
Liberal Democrats	Martin Robinson Dowland	295	9.8	−1.2
Majority		884	29.4	+11.0
Turnout		3,001	30.1	−0.3
Conservative hold		Swing		

Unsworth
Party	Candidate	Votes	%	±%
Labour	Sylvia Mason	1,206	50.1	−10.2
Conservative	Samuel Cohen	811	33.7	+1.9
Environment and Wildlife	Martin Prescott	234	9.7	+9.7
Liberal Democrats	Geoffrey Young	154	6.4	−1.5
Majority		395	16.4	−12.1
Turnout		2,405	29.7	+2.5
Labour hold		Swing		
