= 2022 Bury Metropolitan Borough Council election =

2022 local election in Bury

- 5 May 2022

All 51 seats to Bury Metropolitan Borough Council 26 seats needed for a majority
- Turnout: 39.3%

	First party	Second party	Third party
Leader	Eamonn O'Brien	Nicholas Jones	Unknown
Party	Labour	Conservative	Radcliffe First
Last election	27 seats, 41.8%	15 seats, 41.1%	4 seats, 5.5%
Seats before	28	16	2
Seats won	29	12	8
Seat change	▲2	▼3	▲4
Popular vote	69,271	53,527	11,972
Percentage	44.6%	34.4%	7.7%
Swing	▲2.9%	▼6.7%	▲2.2%
	Fourth party	Fifth party
Leader	Michael Powell	Unknown
Party	Liberal Democrats	Independent
Last election	4 seats, 8.1%	1 seat, 0.3%
Seats before	4	1
Seats won	1	1
Seat change	▼3	Steady
Popular vote	10,790	2,375
Percentage	6.9%	1.5%
Swing	▼1.2%	▲1.2%
- Winner of each seat at the 2022 Bury Metropolitan Borough Council election
Council control before election
Labour
Council control after election
Labour

The 2022 Bury Metropolitan Borough Council election took place on 5 May 2022. Due to boundary changes, all 51 councillors were elected at the same time. The election took place alongside other local elections across the United Kingdom.

In the previous council election in 2021, Labour maintained its control of the council, holding 27 seats after the election. The Conservatives formed the main opposition with fifteen seats, with the Liberal Democrats and Radcliffe First both on four councillors and a single independent.

== Background ==
Result of the 2021 council election

The Local Government Act 1972 created a two-tier system of metropolitan counties and districts covering Greater Manchester, Merseyside, South Yorkshire, Tyne and Wear, the West Midlands, and West Yorkshire starting in 1974. Bury was a district of the Greater Manchester metropolitan county. The Local Government Act 1985 abolished the metropolitan counties, with metropolitan districts taking on most of their powers as metropolitan boroughs. The Greater Manchester Combined Authority was created in 2011 and began electing the mayor of Greater Manchester from 2017, which was given strategic powers covering a region coterminous with the former Greater Manchester metropolitan county.

Since its formation, Bury has variously been under Labour control, Conservative control and no overall control. Councillors have predominantly been elected from the Labour Party and the Conservative Party, with some Liberal Democrat and independent councillors also serving. The council has had an overall Labour majority since the 2011 election, in which Labour made six gains to hold 29 of the 51 seats. The Conservatives held 17 and the Liberal Democrats held five. Labour continued to make gains until 2015, after which the party has gradually lost seats whilst maintaining its majority. In the most recent election in 2021, Labour won nine seats with 41.7% of the vote, the Conservatives won seven seats with 41.1% of the vote, Radcliffe First won two seats with 5.5% of the vote and the Liberal Democrats won one with 8.1% of the vote.

The Conservative Member of Parliament (MP) for Bury South, Christian Wakeford, defected to the Labour Party in January 2022. On the same day, Gareth Staples-Jones, an independent councillor who had been elected as Radcliffe First, also joined the Labour Party.

Bury Council underwent boundary changes ahead of this election. The Local Government Boundary Commission for England determined that the council should continue to elect 51 councillors and designed new election boundaries to reflect population change. The new boundaries include seventeen three-member wards.

== Electoral process ==
The council generally elects its councillors in thirds, with a third being up for election every year for three years, with no election in the fourth year. However, due to a boundary review, all fifty-one councillors were elected at the same time. The election used plurality block voting, with each ward electing three councillors. Electors were able to vote for up to three candidates, and the three candidates with the most votes in each ward were elected.

All registered electors (British, Irish, Commonwealth and European Union citizens) living in Bury aged 18 or over were entitled to vote in the election. People who live at two addresses in different councils, such as university students with different term-time and holiday addresses, were entitled to be registered for and vote in elections in both local authorities. Voting in-person at polling stations took place from 07:00 to 22:00 on election day, and voters were able to apply for postal votes or proxy votes in advance of the election.

== Previous council composition ==
After 2021 election		Before 2022 election	
Party	Seats	Party	Seats
Labour	27	Labour	28
Conservative	15	Conservative	16
Liberal Democrats	4	Liberal Democrats	4
Radcliffe First	4	Radcliffe First	2
Independent	1	Independent	1

== Results summary ==
2022 Bury Metropolitan Borough Council election
Party	Seats	Gains	Losses	Net gain/loss	Seats %	Votes %	Votes	+/−
Labour	29			▲1	56.9	44.6	69,271	+2.9
Conservative	12			▼4	23.5	34.4	53,527	-6.7
Radcliffe First	8			▲4	15.7	7.7	11,972	+2.2
Liberal Democrats	1			▼3	2.0	6.9	10,790	-1.2
Independent	1			▲1	2.0	1.5	2,375	+1.2
Green	0			Steady	0.0	4.6	7,089	+1.6
Reform	0			Steady	0.0	0.2	236	N/A
English Democrat	0			Steady	0.0	0.1	166	-0.1
Communist	0			Steady	0.0	0.1	59	N/A

== Ward results ==
Statements of persons nominated were published on 6 April. Incumbent councillors are marked with an asterisk (*).

=== Besses ===
Besses (3 seats)
Party	Candidate	Votes	%	±%
Labour Co-op	Noel Bayley	1,505	61.4	
Labour Co-op	Mary Whitby*	1,435	58.5	
Labour Co-op	Lucy Smith*	1,397	57.0	
Conservative	Gregory Keeley	548	22.3	
Conservative	David Silbiger	486	19.8	
Conservative	Tahira Shaffi	420	17.1	
Green	Cameron Fay	354	14.4	
Independent	Martyn West	317	12.9	
Liberal Democrats	Mike Williams	176	7.2	
English Democrat	Stephen Morris	166	6.8	
Communist	Dan Ross	59	2.4	
Turnout		2,452	30.7	
Labour win (new seat)				
Labour win (new seat)				
Labour win (new seat)				

=== Bury East ===
Bury East (3 seats)
Party	Candidate	Votes	%	±%
Labour	Ayesha Arif	1,285	46.4	
Labour	Gavin McGill*	1,266	45.7	
Labour	Ummrana Farooq*	1,157	41.8	
Conservative	Christopher Baron	1,045	37.8	
Conservative	Raja Sharif	1,043	37.7	
Conservative	Abdul Tahir	885	32.0	
Green	Lauren Hutchinson	331	12.0	
Reform	Kevin Cadwallader	236	8.5	
Liberal Democrats	Elizabeth Powell	218	7.9	
Turnout		2,768	31.8	
Labour win (new seat)				
Labour win (new seat)				
Labour win (new seat)				

=== Bury West ===
Bury West (3 seats)
Party	Candidate	Votes	%	±%
Conservative	Jackie Harris*	2,023	57.3	
Conservative	Dene Vernon*	1,926	54.6	
Conservative	Shahbaz Arif	1,636	46.4	
Labour	Andrew McAnulty	1,203	34.1	
Labour	Helen Varnom	1,153	32.7	
Labour	Samuel Turner	1,118	31.7	
Green	Jacqui Connor	485	13.7	
Liberal Democrats	Jacob Royde	274	7.8	
Turnout		3,529	41.7	
Conservative win (new seat)				
Conservative win (new seat)				
Conservative win (new seat)				

=== Elton ===
Elton (3 seats)
Party	Candidate	Votes	%	±%
Conservative	Jack Rydeheard*	1,752	48.5	
Labour	Martin Hayes*	1,715	47.5	
Labour	Charlotte Morris*	1,689	46.7	
Conservative	Andrew Luxton	1,671	46.2	
Labour	Kyle Finnegan	1,541	42.6	
Conservative	Muhammad Warraich	1,391	38.5	
Liberal Democrats	Lynda Arthur	416	11.5	
Turnout		3,614	41.5	
Conservative win (new seat)				
Labour win (new seat)				
Labour win (new seat)				

=== Holyrood ===
Holyrood (3 seats)
Party	Candidate	Votes	%	±%
Labour	Elliot Moss	1,660	45.4	
Labour	Imran Rizvi	1,644	44.9	
Liberal Democrats	Maria Tegolo*	1,558	42.6	
Liberal Democrats	Steve Wright*	1,554	42.5	
Labour	Richard Jamieson	1,497	40.9	
Liberal Democrats	Michael Hankey	1,310	35.8	
Conservative	Geoffrey Baron	354	9.7	
Conservative	Anthony Hall	349	9.5	
Green	Peter Curati	340	9.3	
Conservative	Haider Raja	259	7.1	
Turnout		3,660	43.4	
Labour win (new seat)				
Labour win (new seat)				
Liberal Democrats win (new seat)				

=== Moorside ===
Moorside (3 seats)
Party	Candidate	Votes	%	±%
Labour	Sandra Walmsley*	1,588	52.6	
Labour	Ciaron Boles*	1,518	50.3	
Labour	Kevin Peel*	1,482	49.1	
Conservative	Samia Farid	1,106	36.7	
Conservative	Marie Holder	1,026	34.0	
Conservative	Mahzar Latif	907	30.1	
Green	Mary Heath	321	10.6	
Independent	Victor Hagan	259	8.6	
Turnout		3,017	35.6	
Labour win (new seat)				
Labour win (new seat)				
Labour win (new seat)				

=== North Manor ===
North Manor (3 seats)
Party	Candidate	Votes	%	±%
Conservative	Roger Brown*	2,008	51.1	
Conservative	Liam Dean*	1,963	50.0	
Conservative	Khalid Hussain*	1,775	45.2	
Labour	John Southworth	1,568	39.9	
Green	Michelle Sampson	973	24.8	
Green	Charlie Allen	913	23.2	
Liberal Democrats	Ewan Arthur	758	19.3	
Green	Gary Kirkley	574	14.6	
Turnout		3,927	49.3	
Conservative win (new seat)				
Conservative win (new seat)				
Conservative win (new seat)				

=== Pilkington Park ===
Pilkington Park (3 seats)
Party	Candidate	Votes	%	±%
Conservative	Russell Bernstein*	1,409	46.5	
Labour	Elizabeth Fitzgerald	1,405	46.4	
Conservative	Nicholas Jones*	1,344	44.3	
Labour	Christopher Malkin	1,314	43.4	
Labour	Michael Rubinstein	1,296	42.8	
Conservative	Anton Slawycz	1,214	40.1	
Green	Elizabeth Lomax	452	14.9	
Turnout		3,031	40.6	
Conservative win (new seat)				
Labour win (new seat)				
Conservative win (new seat)				

=== Radcliffe East ===
Radcliffe East (3 seats)
Party	Candidate	Votes	%	±%
Radcliffe First	Carol Birchmore*	1,504	58.2	
Radcliffe First	James Mason*	1,449	56.0	
Radcliffe First	Mary Walsh	1,332	51.5	
Labour	Tricia Cathcart	762	29.5	
Labour	Michael Broster	730	28.2	
Labour	Rhyse Cathcart	728	28.2	
Conservative	Mark Gregory	306	11.8	
Conservative	Azhar Mehboob	274	10.6	
Conservative	Iona Worthington	224	8.7	
Green	Heather Sharples	143	5.5	
Turnout		2,586	32.4	
Radcliffe First win (new seat)				
Radcliffe First win (new seat)				
Radcliffe First win (new seat)				

=== Radcliffe North & Ainsworth ===
Radcliffe North & Ainsworth (3 seats)
Party	Candidate	Votes	%	±%
Radcliffe First	Donald Berry	1,436	40.2	
Radcliffe First	Andrea Booth	1,325	37.1	
Conservative	Jo Lancaster*	1,278	35.7	
Conservative	Paul Cropper*	1,278	35.7	
Conservative	Carol Bernstein	1,205	33.7	
Radcliffe First	Ken Simpson	1,201	33.6	
Labour	Lee Patterson	856	23.9	
Labour	Gill Campbell	847	23.7	
Labour	Paddy Heneghan	736	20.6	
Green	Laura Thomas	108	3.0	
Turnout		3,576	38.5	
Radcliffe First win (new seat)				
Radcliffe First win (new seat)				
Conservative win (new seat)				

=== Radcliffe West ===
Radcliffe West (3 seats)
Party	Candidate	Votes	%	±%
Radcliffe First	Glyn Marsden	1,292	49.6	
Radcliffe First	Des Duncalfe	1,263	48.5	
Radcliffe First	Mike Smith*	1,170	44.9	
Labour	Gareth Staples-Jones*	973	37.4	
Labour	Charlie Whelan	873	33.5	
Labour	Sally McGill	852	32.7	
Conservative	David Lewis	362	13.9	
Conservative	Mark Imeson	289	11.1	
Conservative	Muhammad Khan	179	6.9	
Green	Chlöe Thomas	128	4.9	
Liberal Democrats	Kamran Islam	70	2.7	
Turnout		2,603	31.9	
Radcliffe First win (new seat)				
Radcliffe First win (new seat)				
Radcliffe First win (new seat)				

=== Ramsbottom ===
Ramsbottom (3 seats)
Party	Candidate	Votes	%	±%
Labour	Clare Cummins*	2,178	53.4	
Labour	Tom Pilkington*	2,083	51.0	
Labour	Spencer Donnelly	1,948	47.7	
Conservative	James Cunliffe	1,641	40.2	
Conservative	Ian Schofield	1,573	38.5	
Conservative	Jihyun Park	1,284	31.5	
Liberal Democrats	Martyn Bristow	447	11.0	
Green	Mark Slocombe	402	9.9	
Turnout		4,081	45.6	
Labour win (new seat)				
Labour win (new seat)				
Labour win (new seat)				

=== Redvales ===
Redvales (3 seats)
Party	Candidate	Votes	%	±%
Labour	Nikki Frith	1,647	49.5	
Labour	Tamoor Tariq*	1,646	49.4	
Labour	Shaheena Haroon*	1,498	45.0	
Conservative	Aamer Yasin	1,365	41.0	
Conservative	Raja Aijaz	1,344	40.4	
Conservative	Shafqat Mahmood	1,249	37.5	
Green	Paul Johnstone	375	11.3	
Liberal Democrats	David Foss	340	10.2	
Turnout		3,329	39.7	
Labour win (new seat)				
Labour win (new seat)				
Labour win (new seat)				

=== St. Marys ===
St. Marys (3 seats)
Party	Candidate	Votes	%	±%
Labour	Eamonn O’Brien*	1,941	56.7	
Labour	Debra Green	1,676	49.0	
Labour	Sean Thorpe	1,478	43.2	
Liberal Democrats	Michael Powell*	1,382	40.4	
Liberal Democrats	Stephen Lewis	976	28.5	
Liberal Democrats	Ugonna Edegoa	966	28.2	
Conservative	Stefano Zuri	358	10.5	
Green	Nick Hubble	345	10.1	
Conservative	Antonello Riu	332	9.7	
Conservative	Touseef Saghir	292	8.5	
Turnout		3,421	40.8	
Labour win (new seat)				
Labour win (new seat)				
Labour win (new seat)				

=== Sedgley ===
Sedgley (3 seats)
Party	Candidate	Votes	%	±%
Labour	Richard Gold*	1,902	65.2	
Labour	Alan Quinn*	1,863	63.9	
Labour	Debbie Quinn*	1,811	62.1	
Conservative	Bernie Vincent	746	25.6	
Conservative	Mazhar Aslam	568	19.5	
Conservative	Sham Raja Akhtar	511	17.5	
Green	Glyn Heath	346	11.9	
Liberal Democrats	Michael Heaton	345	11.8	
Turnout		2,916	34.7	
Labour win (new seat)				
Labour win (new seat)				
Labour win (new seat)				

=== Tottington ===
Tottington (3 seats)
Party	Candidate	Votes	%	±%
Independent	Yvonne Wright*	1,799	51.1	
Conservative	Luis McBriar*	1,687	47.9	
Conservative	Iain Gartside*	1,541	43.8	
Conservative	Ian Strachan	1,081	30.7	
Labour	Julie Southworth	903	25.7	
Labour	Evelyn Holt	878	24.9	
Labour	David Hills	808	23.0	
Green	Angela Graham	499	14.2	
Turnout		3,520	45.5	
Independent win (new seat)				
Conservative win (new seat)				
Conservative win (new seat)				

=== Unsworth ===
Unsworth (3 seats)
Party	Candidate	Votes	%	±%
Labour	Joan Grimshaw*	2,157	58.7	
Labour	Nathan Boroda*	2,123	57.8	
Labour	Tahir Rafiq*	1,938	52.8	
Conservative	Shirley Balfour	1,451	39.5	
Conservative	Sohail Raja	1,431	39.0	
Conservative	Gibson Walker	1,215	33.1	
Turnout		3,672	44.0	
Labour win (new seat)				
Labour win (new seat)				
Labour win (new seat)				
