= 2002 Bury Metropolitan Borough Council election =

2002 local election in England

Elections to Bury Metropolitan Borough Council were held on 2 May 2002. One-third of the council was up for election and the Labour Party kept overall control of the council.

After the election, the composition of the council was:

- Labour 32
- Conservative 13
- Liberal Democrat 3

== Election result ==
Bury local election result 2002
Party	Seats	Gains	Losses	Net gain/loss	Seats %	Votes %	Votes	+/−
Labour	12	0	0	+0		46.4	23,400	+4.1%
Conservative	3	0	0	+0		36.9	18,361	-4.6%
Liberal Democrats	1	0	0	0		12.9	6,524	-2.2%
Environment and Wildlife	0	0	0	0	0	3.2	1,636	+2.4%
Socialist Alliance	0	0	0	0	0	0.2	112	+0.2%
Independent	0	0	0	0	0	0.3	171	+0.0%

== Ward results ==
Besses
Party	Candidate	Votes	%	±%
Labour	Kenneth Audin	1,277	62.2	+7.2
Conservative	Mark Roberts	473	23.0	−10.1
Liberal Democrats	Ann Garner	303	14.8	+2.9
Majority		804	39.2	+17.3
Turnout		2,053		
Labour hold		Swing		

Church
Party	Candidate	Votes	%	±%
Conservative	Jack Walton	1,936	51.3	−12.0
Labour	Andrew McAnulty	1,425	37.8	+12.4
Environment and Wildlife	Michael Wellock	410	10.9	+5.0
Majority		511	13.5	−24.4
Turnout		3,771		
Conservative hold		Swing		

East
Party	Candidate	Votes	%	±%
Labour	Michael Connolly	1,410	59.5	−2.8
Conservative	Peter Ashworth	575	24.3	−1.3
Liberal Democrats	Victor Hagan	231	10.8	+5.6
Environment and Wildlife	David Bentley	154	6.5	+6.5
Majority		835	35.2	−1.5
Turnout		2,370		
Labour hold		Swing		

Elton
Party	Candidate	Votes	%	±%
Labour	John Costello	1,433	43.9	+2.1
Conservative	Kevin Gould	1,248	38.3	−6.9
Liberal Democrats	Robert Sloss	351	10.8	+3.5
Environment and Wildlife	Louise Llweellyn	230	7.1	+1.4
Majority		185	5.7	
Turnout		3,262		
Labour hold		Swing		

Holyrood
Party	Candidate	Votes	%	±%
Liberal Democrats	Tim Pickstone	1,436	49.7	−6.7
Labour	Susan Worsley	869	30.3	+5.9
Conservative	Jeanette Chrystal	465	16.2	−3.0
Majority		557	19.4	−12.6
Turnout		2,872		
Liberal Democrats hold		Swing		

Moorside
Party	Candidate	Votes	%	±%
Labour	Dorothy Cassidy	1,437	45.9	+9.6
Conservative	Beverley Sullivan	1,234	39.4	−14.0
Environment and Wildlife	Mary Heath	257	8.2	+8.2
Liberal Democrats	Winifred Rohmann	206	6.6	−3.8
Majority		203	6.5	
Turnout		3,134		
Labour hold		Swing		

Pilkington Park
Party	Candidate	Votes	%	±%
Labour	Joan Grimshaw	1,438	46.6	+2.0
Conservative	Peter Redstone	1,350	43.7	−1.2
Liberal Democrats	Mary D'Albert	299	9.7	−0.9
Majority		88	2.8	
Turnout		3,087		
Labour hold		Swing		

Radcliffe Central
Party	Candidate	Votes	%	±%
Labour	Andrea Hughes	1,803	64.4	+0.1
Conservative	Alan Bigg	616	22.0	+3.7
Liberal Democrats	Bryn Hackley	382	13.6	−3.8
Majority		1,187	42.4	−3.6
Turnout		2,801		
Labour hold		Swing		

Radcliffe North
Party	Candidate	Votes	%	±%
Labour	Katherine Briggs	1,994	54.0	
Conservative	Denise Bigg	1,698	46.0	
Majority		296	8.0	
Turnout		3,692		
Labour hold		Swing		

Radcliffe South
Party	Candidate	Votes	%	±%
Labour	Stephen Perkins	1,238	49.1	+3.8
Conservative	David Green	909	36.1	−8.9
Liberal Democrats	Theodor Tymczyna	209	8.3	−1.3
Environment and Wildlife	Bryan Partington	164	6.5	+6.5
Majority		329	13.0	+12.7
Turnout		2,520		
Labour hold		Swing		

Ramsbottom
Party	Candidate	Votes	%	±%
Conservative	Dorothy Gunther	2,301	53.8	+0.8
Labour	Vera McClung	1,508	35.3	−1.6
Liberal Democrats	Fiona Davison	466	10.9	+0.8
Majority		793	18.5	+2.4
Turnout		4,275		
Conservative hold		Swing		

Redvales
Party	Candidate	Votes	%	±%
Labour	Farook Chaudhry	1,338	43.8	−16.7
Conservative	Azhar Mahmood	1,032	33.8	+6.9
Liberal Democrats	Martin Robinson-Dowland	441	14.4	+1.8
Environment and Wildlife	Glyn Heath	246	8.0	+8.0
Majority		306	10.0	−13.6
Turnout		3,057		
Labour hold		Swing		

St Mary's
Party	Candidate	Votes	%	±%
Labour	Eric Grime	1,779	53.3	+9.4
Conservative	Anthony Barlow	871	26.1	−7.6
Liberal Democrats	Michael Halsall	516	15.5	−6.9
Independent	Gerard Van Hecke	171	5.1	+5.1
Majority		908	27.2	+17.0
Turnout		3,337		
Labour hold		Swing		

Sedgley
Party	Candidate	Votes	%	±%
Labour	Peter Timperley	1,894	55.5	+12.4
Liberal Democrats	Janet Turner	943	27.7	−11.7
Conservative	Marilyn Vincent	573	16.8	−0.7
Majority		951	27.9	+24.2
Turnout		3,410		
Labour hold		Swing		

Tottington
Party	Candidate	Votes	%	±%
Conservative	David Higgin	2,182	58.0	−2.4
Labour	Victor McClung	1,113	29.6	+1.1
Liberal Democrats	Jame Eagle	470	12.5	+1.4
Majority		1,069	28.4	−3.5
Turnout		3,765		
Conservative hold		Swing		

Unsworth
Party	Candidate	Votes	%	±%
Labour	Gordon Sharkey	1,444	47.1	+1.4
Conservative	Samuel Cohen	1,168	38.1	−7.2
Liberal Democrats	Geoffrey Young	281	9.2	+0.2
Environment and Wildlife	Martin Prescott	175	5.7	+5.7
Majority		276	9.0	+8.6
Turnout		3,068		
Labour hold		Swing		
