= 2018 Bury Metropolitan Borough Council election =

2018 local election in England

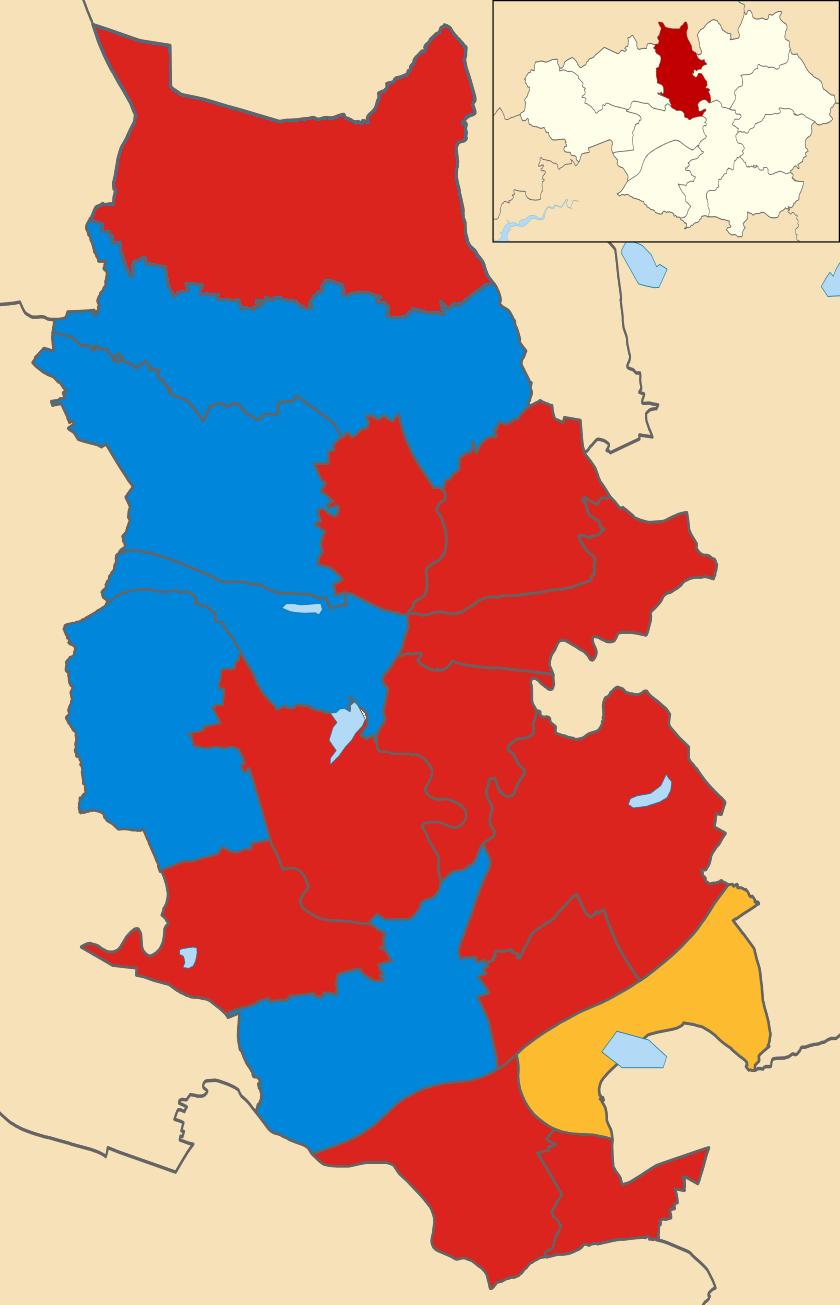
2018 local election results in Bury

The 2018 Bury Metropolitan Borough Council election took place on 3 May 2018 to elect members of Bury Metropolitan Borough Council in England. This was on the same day as other local elections.

== Results summary ==
Bury Metropolitan Borough Council election result, 2018
Party	Candidates						Votes		
Party	Stood	Elected	Gained	Unseated	Net	% of total	%	No.	Net %
Labour	17	11	1	2	▼1	58.8	48.3	25,506	▲7.3
Conservative	17	5	2	1	▲1	29.4	37.8	19,993	▲0.8
Liberal Democrats	14	1	0	0	Steady	5.8	9.5	5,027	▲0.5
Green	12	0	0	0	Steady	0.0	3.0	1,618	▼2.0
Independent	2	0	0	0	Steady	0.0	0.8	449	N/A
English Democrat	1	0	0	0	Steady	0.0	0.3	169	▼0.1
Totals	63	17				100.0	100.0	52,762	

== Ward results ==
=== Besses ===
Besses
Party	Candidate	Votes	%	±%
Labour	Mary Whitby	1,414	59.3	▲0.6
Conservative	Kevin Connolly	551	23.2	▲3.2
English Democrat	Stephen Morris	169	7.1	▼4.4
Green	Larissa Heath	118	4.9	▲1.3
Liberal Democrats	Dominic Jackson	117	4.9	▲0.9
Majority		863		
Turnout				
Labour hold		Swing		

=== Church ===
Church
Party	Candidate	Votes	%	±%
Conservative	Sue Nuttall	2,059	58.5	▼0.8
Labour	Sam Turner	1,260	35.8	▲3.9
Green	Nicole Haydock	197	5.6	▲0.1
Majority		799		
Turnout				
Conservative hold		Swing		

=== East ===
East
Party	Candidate	Votes	%	±%
Labour	Trevor Holt	1,673	59.3	▼4.2
Conservative	Sohail Raja	960	34.0	▲9.1
Green	Glyn Heath	185	6.5	▼5.1
Majority		713		
Turnout				
Labour hold		Swing		

=== Elton ===
Elton
Party	Candidate	Votes	%	±%
Labour	Martin Hayes	1,622	50.8	▲9.0
Conservative	Dene Vernon	1,390	43.5	▲4.9
Green	Charlotte Allen	119	3.7	▲0.1
Liberal Democrats	Jacob Royde	60	1.8	▼0.5
Majority		232		
Turnout				
Labour hold		Swing		

=== Holyrood ===
Holyrood
Party	Candidate	Votes	%	±%
Liberal Democrats	Timothy Pickstone	1,656	46.7	▲1.6
Labour	Gavin McGill	1,356	38.2	▲0.1
Conservative	Bernard Vincent	404	11.4	▲4.1
Green	Peter Curati	128	3.6	Steady
Majority		300		
Turnout				
Liberal Democrats hold		Swing		

=== Moorside ===
Moorside
Party	Candidate	Votes	%	±%
Labour	Sandra Walmsley	1,722	66.1	▲14.8
Conservative	Jacob Maxwell Nau Tupe	633	24.3	▲5.2
Independent	Victor Hagan	128	4.9	N/A
Green	Noel Traynor	119	4.5	▼0.5
Majority		1,089		
Turnout				
Labour hold		Swing		

=== North Manor ===
North Manor
Party	Candidate	Votes	%	±%
Conservative	James Daly	2,337	61.2	▲0.4
Labour	Tom Pilkington	1,213	31.7	▲3.3
Liberal Democrats	Ewan Arthur	143	3.7	▼1.1
Green	Mary Heath	122	3.1	▼2.9
Majority		1,124		
Turnout				
Conservative hold		Swing		

=== Pilkington Park ===
Pilkington Park
Party	Candidate	Votes	%	±%
Conservative	Nicholas Jones	1,967	57.4	▼0.5
Labour	John Mallon	1,263	36.8	▼0.5
Green	Neil Greenhalgh	130	3.7	▲0.1
Liberal Democrats	David Foss	90	2.6	▼1.6
Majority		704		
Turnout				
Conservative gain from Labour		Swing		

=== Radcliffe East ===
Radcliffe East
Party	Candidate	Votes	%	±%
Labour	Karen Leach	1,144	47.1	▼2.5
Conservative	Luis McBriar	709	29.2	▲11.9
Independent	Donald Berry	321	13.2	N/A
Liberal Democrats	Robert Graham	160	6.5	▲0.8
Green	Paul Johnstone	94	3.8	▼3.4
Majority		435		
Turnout				
Labour hold		Swing		

=== Radcliffe North ===
Radcliffe North
Party	Candidate	Votes	%	±%
Conservative	Paul Cropper	1,677	55.0	▲22.8
Labour	Jane Lewis	1,236	40.5	▼6.3
Liberal Democrats	Rodney Rew	132	4.3	N/A
Majority		441		
Turnout				
Conservative gain from Labour		Swing		

=== Radcliffe West ===
Radcliffe West
Party	Candidate	Votes	%	±%
Labour	Rishi Shori	1,283	60.5	▲13.7
Conservative	Zain Shah	531	25.0	▼7.2
Green	Karen Wood	242	11.4	▲8.4
Liberal Democrats	Kamran Islam	64	3.0	▲0.7
Majority		752		
Turnout				
Labour hold		Swing		

=== Ramsbottom ===
Ramsbottom
Party	Candidate	Votes	%	±%
Labour	Kevin Thomas	2,063	51.8	▲8.9
Conservative	Jamie Hoyle	1,788	44.9	▲1.1
Liberal Democrats	Stephen Stokes	130	3.2	N/A
Majority		275		
Turnout				
Labour gain from Conservative		Swing		

=== Redvales ===
Redvales
Party	Candidate	Votes	%	±%
Labour	Tamoor Tariq	1,994	64.3	▲6.0
Conservative	Julie Green	817	26.3	▼3.0
Green	Alan Stead	170	5.4	▲2.0
Liberal Democrats	Gareth Lloyd-Johnson	117	3.7	N/A
Majority		1,177		
Turnout				
Labour hold		Swing		

=== Sedgley ===
Sedgley
Party	Candidate	Votes	%	±%
Labour	Alan Quinn	2,214	60.1	▲16.3
Conservative	Nathan Weissbraun	1,241	33.7	▼10.1
Liberal Democrats	Maria Tegolo	224	6.0	▼0.3
Majority		973		
Turnout				
Labour hold		Swing		

=== St Mary's ===
St Mary's
Party	Candidate	Votes	%	±%
Labour	Eamonn O'Brien	1,635	45.6	▲4.3
Liberal Democrats	Michael Powell	1,578	44.0	▲3.3
Conservative	David Lewis	372	10.3	▼3.9
Majority		57		
Turnout				
Labour hold		Swing		

=== Tottington ===
Tottington
Party	Candidate	Votes	%	±%
Conservative	Iain Gartside	1,561	53.4	▲6.8
Labour	Anthony McCaul	1,164	39.8	▲8.1
Green	Samantha Deas	113	3.8	▲0.3
Liberal Democrats	Andy Minty	84	2.8	▼1.2
Majority		397		
Turnout				
Conservative hold		Swing		

=== Unsworth ===
Unsworth
Party	Candidate	Votes	%	±%
Labour	Mohammed Rafiq	1,250	44.0	▼4.0
Conservative	Satyen Sinha	996	35.1	▲3.9
Liberal Democrats	Steve Middleton	589	20.7	▲16.7
Majority		254		
Turnout				
Labour hold		Swing		
