= 2015 Bury Metropolitan Borough Council election =

2015 UK local government election

Results of the 2015 Bury Metropolitan Borough Council election

The 2015 Bury Metropolitan Borough Council Election took place on 7 May 2015 to elect members of the Metropolitan Borough of Bury in England. This was on the same day as other local elections.

17 seats were contested. The Labour Party won 10 seats, the Conservatives won 6 seats, and the Liberal Democrats won 1 seat.

After the election, the total composition of the council was as follows:

- Labour 35
- Conservative 12
- Liberal Democrats 2
- Independent (politician) 2

== Election result ==
Bury local election result 2015
Party	Seats	Gains	Losses	Net gain/loss	Seats %	Votes %	Votes	+/−
Labour	10	1	2	-1		40.3	37,842	-1.7
Conservative	6	1	0	+1		33.3	31,269	+1.1
UKIP	0	0	0			14.4	13,553	+3.6
Liberal Democrats	2	1	0	+1		7.0	6,557	-1.0
Green	0	0	0	0		4.5	4,253	-1.5
English Democrat	0	0	0	0		0.1	67	-0.8
Independent	0	0	1	-1		0.3	290	+0.3

== Ward results ==
Besses
Party	Candidate	Votes	%	±%
Labour	Alan Matthews	2,628	44.7	−7.7
Conservative	Guy Levy	1,114	18.9	−0.2
Liberal Democrats	Steve Middleton	1,098	18.7	+13.6
UKIP	Phillip Husband	799	13.6	+13.6
Green	Zarrin Shannon	177	3.0	−3.9
English Democrat	Stephen Morris	67	1.1	−15.3
Majority		1114	25.7	−7.6
Turnout		5,883	60.2	+29.7
Labour hold		Swing		

Church
Party	Candidate	Votes	%	±%
Conservative	Jackie Harris	2,933	48.2	−6.2
Labour	Andrew McAnulty	1,997	32.8	−1.2
UKIP	Bernard Hagan	788	13.0	+13.0
Green	Reece Spencer	193	3.2	−5.4
Liberal Democrats	Lynda Arthur	167	2.7	−0.2
Majority		936	15.4	−5.0
Turnout		6,078	71.8	+29.2
Conservative hold		Swing		

East
Party	Candidate	Votes	%	±%
Labour	Mike Connolly	2,748	60.0	+4.6
UKIP	John Axon	853	18.6	−6.7
Conservative	Sham Akhtar	762	16.6	+2.4
Green	Paul Jenkins	220	4.8	−0.3
Majority		1,895	41.3	+11.2
Turnout		4,583	56.7	+23.5
Labour hold		Swing		

Elton
Party	Candidate	Votes	%	±%
Conservative	Michael Hankey	2,334	40.2	+6.7
Labour	Martin Hayes	2,270	39.1	+3.1
UKIP	Walter Southworth	864	14.9	−7.7
Green	Julie Southworth	191	3.3	−1.6
Liberal Democrats	Benjamin Ward	146	2.5	−0.4
Majority		64	1.1	
Turnout		5,805	65.9	+28.8
Conservative gain from Labour		Swing		

Holyrood
Party	Candidate	Votes	%	±%
Liberal Democrats	Mary D'Albert	2,112	35.6	−14.8
Labour	Geraldine Greene	2,066	34.9	−5.2
Conservative	Katy Rothwell	784	13.2	+4.4
UKIP	Michael Zwierzanski	623	10.5	+10.5
Green	Peter Curati	340	5.7	+5.7
Majority		46	0.7	
Turnout		5,925	67.0	+25.3
Liberal Democrats gain from Labour		Swing		

Moorside
Party	Candidate	Votes	%	±%
Labour	Sarah Southworth	2,535	50.4	−1.6
Conservative	Nabila Afilal	1,253	24.9	+8.6
UKIP	Victor Hagan	994	19.8	−6.5
Green	Larissa Heath	248	4.9	−0.5
Majority		1,282	25.5	−0.2
Turnout		5,030	57.9	+25.8
Labour hold		Swing		

North Manor
Party	Candidate	Votes	%	±%
Conservative	Khalid Hussain	3,087	49.0	−1.3
Labour	Steven Treadgold	1,721	27.3	+4.2
UKIP	Tanya Kay	790	12.5	−4.0
Green	Mary Heath	356	5.6	−0.6
Liberal Democrats	Ewan Arthur	344	5.5	+1.6
Majority		1,366	21.7	−5.6
Turnout		6,298	75.0	+31.2
Conservative hold		Swing		

Pilkington Park
Party	Candidate	Votes	%	±%
Conservative	Robert Caserta	2,632	49.9	+10.7
Labour	Debra Green	1,872	35.5	−4.4
UKIP	John Parkinson	507	9.6	−3.8
Green	Zachery Garsia	262	5.0	+1.0
Majority		760	14.4	
Turnout		5,273	68.6	+29.9
Conservative hold		Swing		

Radcliffe East
Party	Candidate	Votes	%	±%
Labour	Catherine Preston	1,837	37.7	−13.8
Conservative	Greg Keeley	1,285	26.4	−3.8
UKIP	Russell Turner	1,012	20.8	+20.8
Independent	Matt Bailey	290	5.9	+5.9
Green	Nicole Haydock	239	4.9	−9.7
Liberal Democrats	Robert Graham	205	4.2	+0.5
Majority		602	12.3	−8.9
Turnout		4,868	56.9	+26.9
Labour gain from Independent		Swing		

Radcliffe North
Party	Candidate	Votes	%	±%
Labour	Jamie Walker	2,193	39.3	−9.8
Conservative	Zain Shah	1,734	31.1	−2.2
UKIP	Ian Hayes	1,244	22.3	+22.3
Liberal Democrats	Rodney Rew	212	3.8	−2.0
Green	Ann Beckett	192	3.4	−8.6
Majority		459	8.2	−7.5
Turnout		5,575	64.8	+30.0
Labour hold		Swing		

Radcliffe West
Party	Candidate	Votes	%	±%
Labour	Rachel Skillen	2,164	45.9	−12.1
Conservative	David Lewis	1,294	27.5	+1.1
UKIP	Christopher Turner	968	20.5	+20.5
Green	Stephen Dillon	195	4.1	−8.8
Liberal Democrats	Kamran Islam	90	1.9	−0.7
Majority		870	18.5	−13.1
Turnout		4,711	56.1	+28.4
Labour hold		Swing		

Ramsbottom
Party	Candidate	Votes	%	±%
Conservative	Rob Hodkinson	3,090	47.1	+0.1
Labour	Karen Leach	2,308	35.2	+2.1
UKIP	David Barker	753	11.5	−4.3
Green	Laura Chepner	404	6.2	+3.0
Majority		782	11.9	−1.9
Turnout		6,555	72.3	+31.8
Conservative hold		Swing		

Redvales
Party	Candidate	Votes	%	±%
Labour	Judith Kelly	2,948	52.8	+1.7
Conservative	Sue Smith	1,416	25.4	+9.7
UKIP	Mike Harling	861	15.4	−9.4
Green	Paul Deaville	189	3.4	−1.7
Liberal Democrats	Gareth Lloyd-Johnson	168	3.0	−0.2
Majority		1,532	27.4	+1.1
Turnout		5,582	62.9	+25.1
Labour hold		Swing		

Sedgley
Party	Candidate	Votes	%	±%
Labour	Michael James	2,579	43.8	−13.9
Conservative	David Silbiger	2,113	35.9	+13.2
UKIP	Jennifer Jamieson	480	8.1	+8.1
Liberal Democrats	Steve Wright	395	6.7	−3.6
Green	Karen Wood	316	5.3	−3.9
Majority		466	7.9	−27.0
Turnout		5,883	65.7	+27.3
Labour hold		Swing		

St. Mary's
Party	Candidate	Votes	%	±%
Labour	Noel Bayley	2,135	40.2	−3.7
Liberal Democrats	Donal O'Hanlon	1,243	23.4	−8.6
Conservative	Zadok Day	1,051	19.8	+3.9
UKIP	Robert Cahill	562	10.6	+10.6
Green	Andrew McKee	317	6.0	−2.2
Majority		892	16.8	+5.0
Turnout		5,308	65.5	+26.4
Labour hold		Swing		

Tottington
Party	Candidate	Votes	%	±%
Conservative	Yvonne Wright	2,682	48.8	+7.3
Labour	Andrew Jones	1,592	28.9	−3.8
UKIP	Ian Henderson	785	14.3	−5.1
Green	Samantha Deas	247	4.5	+1.0
Liberal Democrats	David Foss	194	3.5	+0.7
Majority		1,090	19.8	+11.0
Turnout		5,500	68.9	+29.5
Conservative hold		Swing		

Unsworth
Party	Candidate	Votes	%	±%
Labour	Joan Grimshaw	2,249	45.2	+0.1
Conservative	Bernard Vincent	1,705	34.3	+10.9
UKIP	Ged Smith	670	13.5	−11.1
Liberal Democrats	Katriona Middleton	183	3.7	+1.2
Green	Carm Bithell	167	3.3	+3.3
Majority		544	10.9	−9.6
Turnout		4,974	67.6	+28.2
Labour hold		Swing		
