= 2003 Bury Metropolitan Borough Council election =

2003 local election in England

Elections to Bury Metropolitan Borough Council were held on 1 May 2003. One-third of the council seats were up for election and the Labour Party kept overall control of the council.

After the election, the composition of the council was:

- Labour 28
- Conservative 16
- Liberal Democrat 4

== Election result ==
Bury local election result 2003
Party	Seats	Gains	Losses	Net gain/loss	Seats %	Votes %	Votes	+/−
Labour	7	0	5	-5		40.3	17,624	-6.1
Conservative	7	4	0	+4		39.8	17,405	+2.9
Liberal Democrats	2	1	0	+1		18.8	8,229	+5.9
Green	0	0	0	0		0.9	378	+0.9
Socialist Alliance	0	0	0	0		0.2	98	+0.0

== Ward results ==
Besses
Party	Candidate	Votes	%	±%
Labour	Derek Boden	1,036	58.6	−3.6
Conservative	Mark Roberts	446	25.2	+2.2
Liberal Democrats	Maureen Davison	287	16.2	+1.4
Majority		590	33.3	−5.9
Turnout		1,769		
Labour hold		Swing		

Church
Party	Candidate	Votes	%	±%
Conservative	Robert Bibby	1,761	54.6	+3.3
Labour	Leslie Jones	946	29.3	−8.5
Liberal Democrats	James Eagle	517	16.0	+16.0
Majority		815	25.3	+11.8
Turnout		3,224		
Conservative hold		Swing		

East
Party	Candidate	Votes	%	±%
Labour	Trevor Holt	1,116	55.2	−4.3
Conservative	Matthew Green	520	25.7	+1.4
Liberal Democrats	Victor Hagan	384	19.0	+8.2
Majority		596	29.5	−5.7
Turnout		2,020		
Labour hold		Swing		

Elton
Party	Candidate	Votes	%	±%
Conservative	Denise Bigg	1,215	42.5	+4.2
Labour	Ray Watts	1,126	39.4	−4.5
Liberal Democrats	Robert Sloss	516	18.1	+7.3
Majority		89	3.1	
Turnout		2,857		
Conservative gain from Labour		Swing		

Holyrood
Party	Candidate	Votes	%	±%
Liberal Democrats	Victor D'Albert	1,475	57.9	+8.2
Labour	Susan Worsley	609	23.9	−6.4
Conservative	Jeanette Chrystal	365	14.3	−1.9
Socialist Alliance	Rita McLoughlin	98	3.8	+3.8
Majority		866	34.0	−14.6
Turnout		2,547		
Liberal Democrats hold		Swing		

Moorside
Party	Candidate	Votes	%	±%
Conservative	Beverley Sullivan	1,268	47.6	+8.2
Labour	June Drinkwater	971	36.4	−9.2
Liberal Democrats	Winifred Rohmann	427	16.0	+9.4
Majority		297	11.1	
Turnout		2,666		
Conservative gain from Labour		Swing		

Pilkington Park
Party	Candidate	Votes	%	±%
Conservative	Michelle Wiseman	1,238	47.6	+3.9
Labour	Pamela Walker	1,020	39.2	−7.4
Liberal Democrats	Fiona Davison	345	13.3	+3.6
Majority		218	8.4	
Turnout		2,603		
Conservative gain from Labour		Swing		

Radcliffe Central
Party	Candidate	Votes	%	±%
Labour	Anthony Isherwood	1,455	59.8	−4.6
Conservative	Eric Margieson	570	24.3	+2.3
Liberal Democrats	Mary D'Albert	410	16.8	+3.2
Majority		885	36.3	−6.1
Turnout		2,435		
Labour hold		Swing		

Radcliffe North
Party	Candidate	Votes	%	±%
Labour	Barry Briggs	1,675	52.5	−1.5
Conservative	Alan Bigg	1,514	47.5	+1.5
Majority		161	5.0	−3.0
Turnout		3,189		
Labour hold		Swing		

Radcliffe South
Party	Candidate	Votes	%	±%
Labour	Anthony Cummings	1,096	46.4	−2.7
Conservative	Peter Wright	1,022	43.3	+7.2
Green	Ashleigh Vincent	245	10.4	+10.4
Majority		74	3.1	−9.9
Turnout		2,363		
Labour hold		Swing		

Ramsbottom
Party	Candidate	Votes	%	±%
Conservative	Barry Theckston	2,211	57.3	+3.5
Labour	Keith Rothwell	1,085	28.1	−7.2
Liberal Democrats	Janet Turner	565	14.6	+3.7
Majority		1,126	29.2	+10.7
Turnout		3,861		
Conservative hold		Swing		

Redvales
Party	Candidate	Votes	%	±%
Labour	John Smith	1,088	41.7	−2.1
Conservative	Ijaz Ahmed	890	34.1	+0.3
Liberal Democrats	Martin Robinson-Dowland	499	19.1	+4.7
Green	James Axon	133	5.1	+5.1
Majority		198	7.6	−2.4
Turnout		2,610		
Labour hold		Swing		

St Mary's
Party	Candidate	Votes	%	±%
Labour	Margaret Gibb	1,409	50.9	−2.4
Conservative	Anthony Barlow	795	28.7	+2.6
Liberal Democrats	Michael Halsall	563	20.3	+4.8
Majority		614	22.2	−5.0
Turnout		2,767		
Labour hold		Swing		

Sedgley
Party	Candidate	Votes	%	±%
Liberal Democrats	Ann Garner	1,237	44.2	+16.5
Labour	Gillian Campbell	1,127	40.3	−15.2
Conservative	Marilyn Vincent	533	15.5	−1.3
Majority		110	3.9	
Turnout		2,797		
Liberal Democrats gain from Labour		Swing		

Tottington
Party	Candidate	Votes	%	±%
Conservative	William Johnson	2,053	60.0	+2.0
Labour	Victor McClung	802	23.4	−6.2
Liberal Democrats	David Foss	569	16.6	+4.1
Majority		1,251	36.5	+8.1
Turnout		3,424		
Conservative hold		Swing		

Unsworth
Party	Candidate	Votes	%	±%
Conservative	Peter Ashworth	1,104	42.4	+4.3
Labour	Vera McClung	1,063	40.9	−6.2
Liberal Democrats	Geoffrey Young	435	16.7	+7.5
Majority		41	1.6	
Turnout		2,602		
Conservative gain from Labour		Swing		
