= 2011 Bury Metropolitan Borough Council election =

Results of the 2011 Bury Metropolitan Borough Council election

Elections to Bury Council took place on 5 May 2011. One third of the council was up for election, and the Labour Party took overall control of the council.

17 seats were contested. The Labour Party won 13 seats, and the Conservatives won 4 seats.

After the election, the total composition of the council was as follows:

- Labour 29
- Conservative 17
- Liberal Democrats 5

== Election result ==
Bury local election result 2011
Party	Seats	Gains	Losses	Net gain/loss	Seats %	Votes %	Votes	+/−
Labour	13	6	0	+6		48.7	28,367	+12.8
Conservative	4	0	3	-3		34.2	19,899	-1.5
Liberal Democrats	0	0	3	-3		11.1	6,484	-11.2
UKIP	0	0	0			3.7	2,162	+3.7
Green	0	0	0	0	0	0.6	345	-0.4
English Democrat	0	0	0	0	0	0.6	382	+0.4
Independent	0	0	0	0	0	1.0	566	+0.3

== Ward results ==
Besses
Party	Candidate	Votes	%	±%
Labour	Alan Matthews	1,523	54.9	+12.8
Liberal Democrats	Julie Baum	468	16.8	−8.8
Conservative	Ian Silvester	462	16.6	−5.9
English Democrat	Stephen Morris	185	6.7	+2.9
UKIP	Andrew Redstone	138	5.0	+5.0
Majority		1,055	38.0	+21.5
Turnout		2,776	33.8	−21.1
Labour hold		Swing		

Church
Party	Candidate	Votes	%	±%
Conservative	Jack Walton	1,975	51.9	+8.6
Labour	Susan Southworth	1,551	40.8	+13.1
Liberal Democrats	Andrew Garner	277	7.3	−12.2
Majority		424	11.1	−4.2
Turnout		3,803	45.2	−25.9
Conservative hold		Swing		

East
Party	Candidate	Votes	%	±%
Labour	Michael Connolly	1,589	50.6	+4.4
Conservative	Saddique Anjum	983	31.3	+2.9
UKIP	Peter Entwistle	433	13.8	+13.8
Liberal Democrats	Maureen Davison	132	4.2	−11.5
Majority		606	19.3	+1.5
Turnout		3,137	39.6	−18.1
Labour hold		Swing		

Elton
Party	Candidate	Votes	%	±%
Labour	James Frith	1,743	45.6	+11.2
Conservative	Alan Creswell	1,600	45.5	+7.5
Liberal Democrats	Zadok Day	172	4.9	−15.2
Majority		143	0.1	
Turnout		3,515	41.3	−24.8
Labour gain from Conservative		Swing		

Holyrood
Party	Candidate	Votes	%	±%
Labour	Gill Campbell	1,508	42.1	+12.0
Liberal Democrats	Wilf Davison	1,314	36.7	−10.4
Conservative	Carl Curran	584	16.3	−6.5
English Democrat	Valerie Morris	173	4.8	+4.8
Majority		194	5.4	
Turnout		3,579	40.7	−25.8
Labour gain from Liberal Democrats		Swing		

Moorside
Party	Candidate	Votes	%	±%
Labour	Keith Rothwell	1,629	45.6	+2.2
Conservative	Azmat Husain	901	27.4	−1.6
Liberal Democrats	Timothy Boden	360	10.9	−4.3
Independent	Victor Hagan	277	8.4	+5.9
Pirate	Graeme Lambert	119	3.6	+3.6
Majority		728	22.1	+7.7
Turnout		3,286	36.5	−21.5
Labour hold		Swing		

North Manor
Party	Candidate	Votes	%	±%
Conservative	Khalid Hussain	1,868	46.2	−6.9
Labour	Andrew Jones	1,178	29.1	+7.7
Liberal Democrats	Ewan Arthur	482	11.9	−9.5
Green	Glyn Heath	345	8.5	+4.4
Independent	Lynnette Mitchell-Male	170	4.2	+4.2
Majority		690	17.1	−14.5
Turnout		4,043	49.8	−25.6
Conservative hold		Swing		

Pilkington Park
Party	Candidate	Votes	%	±%
Conservative	Robert Caserta	1,446	43.6	
Labour	John Mallon	1,365	41.1	
UKIP	Peter Redstone	362	10.9	
Liberal Democrats	Wayne Burrows	144	4.3	
Majority		81	2.5	
Turnout		3,317	42.1	−24.5
Conservative hold		Swing		

Radcliffe East
Party	Candidate	Votes	%	±%
Labour	Matt Bailey	1,623	53.3	+16.8
Conservative	Bernard Slingsby	1,013	33.3	−0.3
UKIP	Nick McNeill	277	9.1	+9.1
Liberal Democrats	Michael Bell	130	4.3	−16.5
Majority		610	20.0	+17.1
Turnout		3,043	35.1	−25.0
Labour hold		Swing		

Radcliffe North
Party	Candidate	Votes	%	±%
Labour	Peter Bury	1,799	50.7	+12.3
Conservative	Stewart Penketh	1,576	44.4	+7.0
Liberal Democrats	Fiona Davison	176	4.9	−6.5
Majority		223	6.3	+5.3
Turnout		3,551	40.7	−23.2
Labour gain from Conservative		Swing		

Radcliffe West
Party	Candidate	Votes	%	±%
Labour	Tony Cummings	1,901	70.0	+28.6
Conservative	Samantha Davies	719	26.5	−1.8
Liberal Democrats	Kamran Islam	97	3.5	−16.0
Majority		1,182	43.5	+30.4
Turnout		2,717	32.0	−24.1
Labour hold		Swing		

Ramsbottom
Party	Candidate	Votes	%	±%
Labour	Joanne Columbine	1,823	46.9	+5.8
Conservative	Robert Hodkinson	1,822	46.9	+9.7
Liberal Democrats	Helen Herd	241	6.2	−11.9
Majority		1	0.2	−3.6
Turnout		3,886	43.0	−26.3
Labour gain from Conservative		Swing		

Redvales
Party	Candidate	Votes	%	±%
Labour	John Smith	2,008	56.7	+14.6
Conservative	Tahira Shaffi	913	25.8	−0.6
UKIP	Steve Evans	404	11.4	+11.4
Liberal Democrats	Emma Davison	215	6.1	−15.1
Majority		1,095	30.9	+15.5
Turnout		3,540	39.3	−23.0
Labour hold		Swing		

Sedgley
Party	Candidate	Votes	%	±%
Labour	Michael James	2,317	57.5	+21.8
Liberal Democrats	Steve Wright	843	20.9	−12.0
Conservative	Marilyn Vincent	688	17.1	−14.3
UKIP	Raymond Solomon	181	4.5	+4.5
Majority		1,474	36.6	+33.8
Turnout		4,029	45.1	−23.4
Labour gain from Liberal Democrats		Swing		

St. Mary's
Party	Candidate	Votes	%	±%
Labour	Noel Bayley	1,612	47.9	+15.9
Liberal Democrats	Richard Baum	1,039	30.9	−7.2
Conservative	Beverley Sullivan	554	16.5	−7.8
UKIP	Adam Greene	158	4.7	+4.7
Majority		573	17.0	
Turnout		3,363	41.0	−23.5
Labour gain from Liberal Democrats		Swing		

Tottington
Party	Candidate	Votes	%	±%
Conservative	Yvonne Wright	1,646	50.6	+5.3
Labour	Simon Carter	1,323	40.7	+11.8
Liberal Democrats	David Foss	283	8.7	−11.0
Majority		323	9.9	−6.5
Turnout		3,252	40.7	−28.4
Conservative hold		Swing		

Unsworth
Party	Candidate	Votes	%	±%
Labour	Joan Grimshaw	1,875	56.1	+12.0
Conservative	Janice Cheetham	1,149	34.4	−6.0
UKIP	Chris Frost	209	6.2	+6.2
Liberal Democrats	Joanne O'Hanlon	111	3.3	−12.2
Majority		726	21.7	+18.1
Turnout		3,344	45.0	−23.4
Labour hold		Swing		
