= Salford City Council elections =

Local government elections in Salford, England

Salford City Council elections are generally held three years out of every four, with a third of the council being elected each time. Salford City Council is the local authority for the metropolitan borough of Salford in Greater Manchester, England. Since the last boundary changes in 2020, 60 councillors have been elected from 20 wards.

== Council elections ==
Since 1973 political control of the council has been held by the Labour Party.

Year	Labour	Reform	Conservative	Green	Lib Dems	Independent	Community Action
2026	34	14	6	3	1	1	-
2024	50	0	7	0	2	1	-
2023	49	0	8	0	2	1	-
2022	49	-	8	0	2	1	-
2021	52	-	7	0	1	0	-
2019	51	-	8	0	0	1	-
2018	50	-	9	0	0	1	-
2016	50	-	9	0	0	1	-
2015	52	-	8	0	0	0	-
2014	52	-	8	0	0	0	-
2012	52	-	8	0	0	0	0
2011	44	-	11	0	3	2	0
2010	39	-	13	0	5	1	2
2008	36	-	13	0	10	0	1
2007	44	-	8	0	8	0	0
2006	44	-	8	0	8	0	0
2004	44	-	8	0	8	0	0
2003	51	-	3	0	5	1	0
2002	52	-	2	0	6	0	0
2000	52	-	3	-	5	0	0
1999	56	-	0	-	4	0	0
1998	57	-	0	-	3	0	0
1997	57	-	0	-	3	0	0
1996	57	-	0	-	3	0	0
1995	55	-	3	-	2	0	0
1994	54	-	5	-	1	0	0
1993	54	-	6	-	0	0	0
1992	54	-	6	-	0	0	0
1991	56	-	4	-	0	0	0
1990	55	-	5	-	0	0	0

== Borough result maps ==
2004 results map

2006 results map

2007 results map

2008 results map

2010 results map

2011 results map

2012 results map

2014 results map

2015 results map

2016 results map

2018 results map

2019 results map

2021 results map

2022 results map

2023 results map

2024 results map

2026 results map

== By-election results ==
=== May 1996 to May 1998 ===
Cadishead By-election 1 May 1997
Party	Candidate	Votes	%	±%
Labour		2,654	62.3	−21.1
Conservative		1,141	26.8	+26.8
Liberal Democrats		466	10.9	−5.7
Majority		1,512	35.5	
Turnout		4,261		
Labour hold		Swing		

Winton By-election 1 May 1997
Party	Candidate	Votes	%	±%
Labour		3,963	68.3	−7.4
Conservative		1,034	17.8	−4.7
Liberal Democrats		807	13.9	+2.6
Majority		2,929	50.5	
Turnout		5,804		
Labour hold		Swing		

Walkden North By-Election 4 December 1997
Party	Candidate	Votes	%	±%
Labour		705	78.6	−4.1
Liberal Democrats		108	12.0	+4.8
Conservative		84	9.4	−0.7
Majority		597	66.6	
Turnout		897	10.5	
Labour hold		Swing		

=== May 2000 to May 2002 ===
Barton By-election 7 June 2001
Party	Candidate	Votes	%	±%
Labour	Neville Clarke	2,070	64.1	+8.6
Liberal Democrats	Margaret Powis	594	18.4	−2.0
Conservative	Judith Tope	564	17.5	−6.6
Majority		1,476	45.7	
Turnout		3,228	42.8	+24.4
Labour hold		Swing		

Ordsall By-election 7 June 2001
Party	Candidate	Votes	%	±%
Labour	Susan Slater	1,025	58.7	−6.9
Liberal Democrats	Ann Gibbons	587	33.6	+8.6
Independent	Sheila Wallace	81	4.6	+4.6
Socialist Alliance	Gary Duke	54	3.1	+3.1
Majority		438	25.1	
Turnout		1,747		
Labour hold		Swing		

=== May 2004 to May 2006 ===
Eccles By-election 25 November 2004
Party	Candidate	Votes	%	±%
Labour	Jane Murphy	842	40.4	+1.3
Conservative	Michael Edwards	677	32.5	+3.6
Liberal Democrats	Deborah Rushton	566	27.1	−4.9
Majority		165	7.9	
Turnout		2,085	26.3	−12.8
Labour gain from Liberal Democrats		Swing		

Langworthy By-election 10 March 2005
Party	Candidate	Votes	%	±%
Labour	Gina Loveday	720	55.4	+13.2
Liberal Democrats	John Deas	410	31.6	+9.1
Conservative	Jeremiah Horgan	169	13.0	−2.8
Majority		310	23.8	
Turnout		1,303	14.8	−16.0
Labour hold		Swing		

Ordsall By-election 10 March 2005
Party	Candidate	Votes	%	±%
Labour	James Harold	439	59.9	+21.3
Liberal Democrats	Bernard Carson	144	19.6	−11.1
Conservative	Johnathan Thomason	96	13.1	−3.6
Green	Jadwiga Irksa	32	4.4	+4.4
Independent	Alan Valentine	22	3.0	−11.0
Majority		295	40.3	
Turnout		734	12.6	−15.6
Labour hold		Swing		

Swinton South By-election 10 March 2005
Party	Candidate	Votes	%	±%
Labour	Valerie Burgoyne	643	34.9	−2.2
Liberal Democrats	Joseph O'Neill	579	31.5	−0.8
Conservative	Christopher Davies	543	29.5	+0.0
Green	Ian Davies	76	4.1	+4.1
Majority		64	3.4	
Turnout		1,843	22.1	−14.4
Labour hold		Swing		

Barton By-election 29 September 2005
Party	Candidate	Votes	%	±%
Labour	Norbert Potter	676	45.6	+1.6
Liberal Democrats	Roy Laurence	389	26.2	−4.1
Conservative	Judith Tope	189	12.7	−13.0
UKIP	Bernard Gill	137	9.2	+9.2
Independent	Alan Valentine	93	6.3	+6.3
Majority		287	19.4	
Turnout		1,489	17.1	−15.4
Labour hold		Swing		

=== May 2008 to May 2010 ===
Pendlebury by-election 19 March 2009
Party	Candidate	Votes	%	±%
Labour	John Ferguson	1,055	38.2	+1.3
Conservative	Jillian Collinson	874	31.6	+0.4
BNP	Eddy O'Sullivan	373	13.5	+0.2
Liberal Democrats	Paul Gregory	368	13.3	−0.9
Independent	Stuart Cremins	49	1.8	−2.6
Green	Diana Battersby	43	1.6	+1.6
Majority		181	6.6	
Turnout		2,762	30.7	
Labour hold		Swing		

Irwell Riverside By-election 21 May 2009
Party	Candidate	Votes	%	±%
Labour	Matt Mold	606	37.6	−13.3
Liberal Democrats	Steven Middleton	293	18.2	−1.1
BNP	Gary Tumulty	276	17.1	+3.8
Conservative	Chris Bates	189	11.7	−4.7
Green	Rob Mitchell	125	7.8	+7.8
UKIP	Duran O'Dwyer	123	7.6	+7.6
Majority		313	19.4	
Turnout		1,612	17.6	
Labour hold		Swing		

=== May 2010 to May 2011 ===
Walkden North by-election, 3 March 2011
Party	Candidate	Votes	%	±%
Labour	Brendan Patrick Ryan	1,291		
Conservative	Chris Bates	209		
English Democrat	Laurence Depares	125		
BNP	Keith Fairhurst	92		
Liberal Democrats	Susan Carson	62		
Majority		1,082		
Turnout		1,786	20.9	
Labour hold		Swing		

=== May 2011 to May 2012 ===
Eccles By-election, 20 October 2011
Party	Candidate	Votes	%	±%
Labour	Michael Wheeler	1,227	54.46	
Conservative	Nicholas Johnson	701	31.11	
BNP	Kay Pollitt	147	6.52	
Liberal Democrats	Valerie Kelly	125	5.54	
Independent	Alan Dominic Valentine	53	2.35	
Majority		526		
Turnout		2,253	25.15	

=== May 2012 to May 2014 ===
Weaste and Seedley By-election, 20 June 2013
Party	Candidate	Votes	%	±%
Labour	Paul Wilson	785	44.4	−10.3
UKIP	Glyn Wright	401	22.7	+22.7
Conservative	Adam Kennaugh	260	14.7	+2.0
Green	Mary Ferrer	80	4.5	+4.5
BNP	Kay Pollitt	74	4.2	−4.5
Independent	Matt Simpson	64	3.6	+3.6
Liberal Democrats	Valerie Kelly	58	3.3	−15.4
TUSC	Terry Simmons	30	1.7	+1.7
Independent	Alan Valentine	15	0.8	+0.8
Majority		384		
Turnout		1778	19.9	
Labour hold		Swing		

Election followed the death of Councillor Janet Rochford (Labour).

Weaste and Seedley By-election, 10 October 2013
Party	Candidate	Votes	%	±%
Labour	Stephen Hesling	803	52.9	
UKIP	Glyn Wright	280	18.4	
Conservative	Adam Kennaugh	240	15.8	
Independent	Matt Simpson	96	6.3	
Green	Andrew Olsen	42	2.8	
BNP	Kay Pollitt	29	1.9	
TUSC	Terry Simmons	24	1.4	
Majority		523	34.5	
Turnout		1,518	16.6	
Labour hold		Swing		

Swinton South By-election, 7 January 2014
Party	Candidate	Votes	%	±%
Labour	Neil Blower	661	45.1	−0.5
Conservative	Anne Broomhead	298	20.3	+4.3
UKIP	Robert Wakefield	215	14.7	+14.7
Green	Joe O'Neill	196	13.4	−3.4
English Democrat	Paul Whitelegg	54	3.7	−1.1
TUSC	Steve Cullen	43	2.9	+2.9
Majority		363		
Turnout				
Labour hold		Swing		

Election followed the death of Councillor Norbert Potter (Labour).

=== May 2016 to May 2018 ===
Kersal By-election, 2 March 2017
Party	Candidate	Votes	%	±%
Conservative	Arnold Saunders	850	42.0	−1.4
Labour	Mike Pevitt	553	27.3	−21.5
Independent	Jonny Wineberg	354	17.5	+17.5
UKIP	Christopher Barnes	182	9.0	+9.0
Green	Jason Reading	48	2.4	−3.4
Liberal Democrats	Adam Slack	39	1.9	+1.9
Majority		297	14.6	
Turnout		2,033	24.12	
Conservative gain from Labour		Swing		

Election followed the death of Councillor Harry Davies (Labour).

Claremont By-election, 8 June 2017
Party	Candidate	Votes	%	±%
Labour	Neil Andrew Reynolds	3,300	61.58	
Conservative	Charlotte Woods	1,455	27.15	
Liberal Democrats	Stef Lorenz	319	5.95	
Green	Daniel Towers	236	4.40	
The Republic Party	Stuart Cremins	49	0.91	
Majority		1,845	34.43	
Turnout		5,384	65	
Labour hold		Swing		

Election follows the resignation of Councillor Sareda Dirir (Labour).

Claremont By-election, 5 October 2017
Party	Candidate	Votes	%	±%
Labour	Mike Pevitt	718	46.50	
Conservative	Charlotte Woods	447	28.95	
Independent	Mary Ferrer	171	11.08	
Liberal Democrats	Stef Lorenz	162	10.49	
Green	Daniel Towers	46	2.98	
Majority		271	17.55	
Turnout		1,550	18.53	
Labour hold		Swing		

Election followed the death of Councillor Joe Murphy (Labour).

Langworthy By-election, 14 December 2017
Party	Candidate	Votes	%	±%
Labour	Wilson Nkurunziza	601	57.7	
Conservative	James Ian Mount	183	17.6	
Liberal Democrats	Jake Overend	125	12.0	
Green	Ian Pattinson	72	6.9	
Independent	Michael James Felse	55	5.3	
Majority		476	45.7	
Turnout		1,041	11.8	
Labour hold		Swing		

Election followed the death of Councillor Paul Longshaw (Labour).

=== May 2018 to May 2019 ===
Eccles By-election, 27 September 2018
Party	Candidate	Votes	%	±%
Labour	Mike McCusker*	1,071	54.5	
Conservative	Andrew Darlington	474	24.1	
Liberal Democrats	Jake Overend	156	7.9	
Green	Helen Alker	123	6.2	
UKIP	Keith Hallam	100	5.1	
Women's Equality	Caroline Stephanie Dean	39	2	
Majority		597	30.4	
Turnout		1966	20.92	
Labour hold		Swing		

Election followed the resignation of Councillor Peter Wheeler (Labour).

=== May 2021 to May 2022 ===
Blackfriars and Trinity By-election, 4 November 2021
Party	Candidate	Votes	%	±%
Labour	Roseanna Wain	408	51.8	−2.3
Green	David Jones	160	20.3	−6.4
Liberal Democrats	Joseph Allen	152	19.3	+13.0
Conservative	Christopher Bates	68	8.6	+0.8
Majority		248	31.5	
Turnout		788	10.1	
Labour hold		Swing	▲2.1	

Election followed the death of Councillor Raymond Walker (Labour).

=== May 2023 to May 2024 ===
Quays By-election, 11 January 2024
Party	Candidate	Votes	%	±%
Liberal Democrats	Paul Heilbron	540	54.8	+17.4
Labour	Elizabeth McCoy	321	32.6	−12.6
Green	Andrea Romero O'Brien	124	12.6	+3.4
Majority		219	22.2	
Turnout		985		
Liberal Democrats hold		Swing		

Election followed the resignation of Councillor Alex Warren (Liberal Democrats).

=== May 2024 to May 2026 ===
Eccles By-election, 31 October 2024
Party	Candidate	Votes	%	±%
Labour	Elizabeth McCoy	951	51.2	−11.2
Conservative	Daniel Whitehouse	426	23.0	+6.4
Green	Sara Laing	261	14.1	+0.0
Liberal Democrats	Ian McKinlay	142	7.7	+7.7
TUSC	Sally Griffiths	76	4.1	−1.7
Majority		525	28.3	
Turnout		1,856		
Labour hold		Swing		

Election followed the resignation of Councillor Sharmina August (Labour).

Barton and Winton By-election, 22 April 2026
Party	Candidate	Votes	%	±%
Reform	Michael James Felse	676	34.9	N/A
Labour	Catherine Goodyer	643	33.2	−35.3
Green	Jack Groom	363	18.7	+7.1
Conservative	Holly Ann Muldoon	118	6.1	−7.9
Liberal Democrats	Antony Ian Duke	94	4.9	−1.0
Independent	Kirsty Anne Downie	44	2.3	N/A
Majority		33	1.7	
Turnout		1,941	17.82	
Reform gain from Labour		Swing	35.1	

Election followed the death of Councillor David Lancaster (Labour).
