= Swinton South =

- Electoral ward
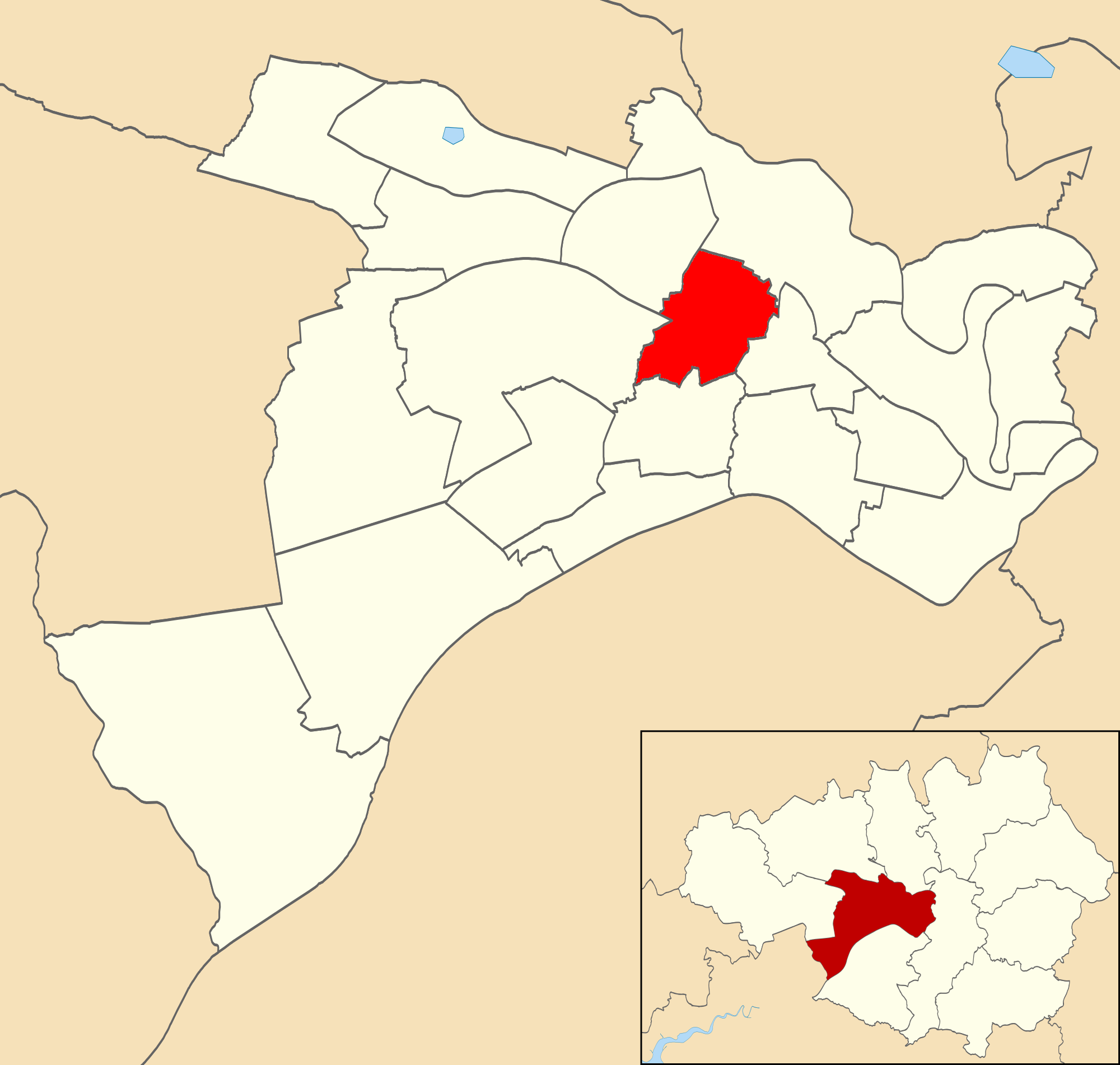
- Swinton South ward within Salford City Council.

- Coat of arms
- Motto: Let the good (or safety) of the people be the supreme (or highest) law
- Interactive map of Swinton South
- Coordinates: 53.5047°N 2.3354°W
- Country: United Kingdom
- Constituent country: England
- Region: North West England
- County: Greater Manchester
- Metropolitan borough: Salford
- Created: May 2004
- Abolished: May 2021
- Named for: Swinton

Government UK Parliament constituency: Salford and Eccles
  - Type: Unicameral
  - Body: Salford City Council
  - Mayor of Salford: Paul Dennett (Labour)

Population
  - Total: 11,458
- Ward profile conducted by Salford City Council in 2014.

Swinton South was an electoral ward of Salford, England between 2004 and 2021. It was represented in Westminster by Rebecca Long-Bailey MP for Salford and Eccles. A profile of the ward conducted by Salford City Council in 2014 recorded a population of 11,458.

The ward was abolished following a review by the Local Government Boundary Commission for England

== Councillors ==
The ward was represented by three councillors:

Election	Councillor	Councillor	Councillor
2004	Charles McIntyre (Lab)	Howard Balkind (Lab Co-op)	Douglas Daniels (Lab)
2006	Joseph O'Neill (Lib Dem)	Howard Balkind (Lab Co-op)	Douglas Daniels (Lab)
2007	Joseph O'Neill (Lib Dem)	Steve Cooke (Lib Dem)	Douglas Daniels (Lab)
2008	Joseph O'Neill (Lib Dem)	Steve Cooke (Lib Dem)	Martin O’Neill (Lib Dem)
2009	Joseph O'Neill (Ind)	Steve Cooke (Lib Dem)	Martin O’Neill (Lib Dem)
2010	Howard Balkind (Lab Co-op)	Steve Cooke (Lib Dem)	Martin O’Neill (Lib Dem)
2011	Howard Balkind (Lab Co-op)	Norbert Potter (Lab)	Martin O’Neill (Lib Dem)
2012	Howard Balkind (Lab Co-op)	Norbert Potter (Lab)	Gena Merrett (Lab)
By-election; 7 January 2014	Howard Balkind (Lab Co-op)	Neil Watkin (Lab)	Gena Merrett (Lab)
2014	Howard Balkind (Lab Co-op)	Neil Watkin (Lab)	Gena Merrett (Lab)
2015	Howard Balkind (Lab Co-op)	Neil Watkin (Lab)	Gena Merrett (Lab)
February 2016	Howard Balkind (Lab Co-op)	Neil Watkin (Ind)	Heather Fletcher (Lab)
2016	Howard Balkind (Lab Co-op)	Neil Watkin (Ind)	Heather Fletcher (Lab)
November 2017	Howard Balkind (Ind)	Neil Watkin (Ind)	Heather Fletcher (Lab)
2018	Stuart Dickman (Lab)	Neil Watkin (Ind)	Heather Fletcher (Lab)
2019	Stuart Dickman (Lab)	Jim Cammell (Lab)	Heather Fletcher (Lab)
2021	Ward abolished		

indicates seat up for re-election. indicates seat won in by-election. indicates councillor defected.

- NB: Neil Watkin is an author who also uses the name Neil Blower.

== Elections in 2010s ==
=== May 2019 ===
2019
Party	Candidate	Votes	%	±%
Labour	Jim Cammell	815	34.7	
Independent	Carol Margaret Boyce	565	24.1	
UKIP	Stacey Olsen	347	14.8	
Conservative	Catherine Bisbey	304	12.9	
Green	Samuel Clarke	187	8.0	
Liberal Democrats	James Karl Blessing	130	5.5	
Majority		250		
Turnout		2,367	28.73	
Labour gain from Independent		Swing		

=== May 2018 ===
2018
Party	Candidate	Votes	%	±%
Labour	Stuart Dickman	1,185	53.6	
Conservative	Adam Carney	491	22.2	
English Democrat	Craig Holmes	163	7.4	
Green	Nicola Smith	137	6.2	
SDP	Joe O’Neill	130	5.9	
Liberal Democrats	Jade O’Neil	103	4.7	
Majority		694	31.4	
Turnout		2,544	26.56	
Labour gain from Independent		Swing		

=== May 2016 ===
2016
Party	Candidate	Votes	%	±%
Labour	Heather Fletcher	1,105	46.3	−0.4
UKIP	Joe O'Neill	579	24.2	+1.4
Conservative	Nicky Turner	443	18.5	−3.6
Green	Nicola Smith	161	6.7	+1.2
TUSC	Matt Kilsby	49	2.1	−0.2
English Democrat	Craig Holmes	43	1.8	N/A
British Resistance	Eddy O'Sullivan	9	0.4	N/A
Majority		526	22.0	−2.0
Turnout		2,389	29.3	−28.3
Labour hold		Swing		

=== May 2015 ===
2015
Party	Candidate	Votes	%	±%
Labour	Neil Blower* Independent from 2016	2,228	46.7	+5.2
UKIP	Joe O'Neill	1,086	22.8	−13.3
Conservative	Anne Broomhead	1,054	22.1	+4.1
Green	Sean Anthony Fairbrother	264	5.5	N/A
TUSC	Jill Royle	111	2.3	−2.2
Majority		1,142	24.0	+18.6
Turnout		4,767	57.6	
Labour hold		Swing		

=== May 2014 ===
2014
Party	Candidate	Votes	%	±%
Labour	Howard Saul Balkind	1,004	41.5	
UKIP	Joe O'Neill	874	36.1	
Conservative	Anne Broomhead	435	18.0	
TUSC	Steve Cullen	108	4.5	
Majority		130	5.4	
Turnout		2421		
Labour hold		Swing		

=== By-election 7 January 2014 ===
By-election 7 January 2014
Party	Candidate	Votes	%	±%
Labour	Neil Blower	661		
Conservative	Anne Broomhead	298		
UKIP	Robert Wakefield	215		
Green	Joe O'Neill	196		
English Democrat	Paul Whitelegg	54		
TUSC	Steve Cullen	43		
Majority		363		
Turnout		1,471	16.24	
Labour hold		Swing		

=== May 2012 ===
2012
Party	Candidate	Votes	%	±%
Labour	Gena Merrett	1,072	45.6	+21.5
Green	Joe O'Neill	394	16.7	N/A
Conservative	Jonathon Taylor	376	16.0	−3.8
BNP	Kay Pollitt	172	7.3	N/A
Liberal Democrats	Christopher Seed	141	6.0	−37.1
English Democrat	John Mulcahy	112	4.8	N/A
Community Action	Geoff Ashall	86	3.7	N/A
Majority		678	28.8	
Turnout		2,373	28.1	−4.2
Labour hold		Swing		

=== May 2011 ===
2011
Party	Candidate	Votes	%	±%
Labour	Norbert Potter	1,356	47.4	+19.4
Green	Joe O'Neill	481	16.8	N/A
Conservative	Christine Allcock	553	19.3	+5.4
Liberal Democrats	Valerie Kelly	277	9.7	−31.9
UKIP	Angela Duffy	194	6.8	N/A
Majority		803		
Turnout		2,882	34.7	
Labour gain from Liberal Democrats		Swing		

=== May 2010 ===
2010
Party	Candidate	Votes	%	±%
Labour	Howard Balkind	1,671	33.7	+9.6
Liberal Democrats	Paul Gregory	1,358	27.4	−15.7
Conservative	Chris Allcock	1,055	21.3	+1.5
Independent	Joe O'Neill*	837	16.9	+16.9
Majority		313	6.3	−12.7
Turnout		4,954	60.0	+27.7
Labour gain from Independent		Swing		

== Elections in 2000s ==
2008
Party	Candidate	Votes	%	±%
Liberal Democrats	Martin O’Neill Independent from 2009	1,150	43.1	+1.6
Labour	Valerie Burgoyne	642	24.1	−3.9
Conservative	Hilary Brunyee	527	19.8	+5.9
Independent	Dave Kelly	347	13.0	+4.3
Majority		508	19.0	
Turnout			32.3	
Liberal Democrats gain from Labour		Swing		

2007
Party	Candidate	Votes	%	±%
Liberal Democrats	Steve Cooke	1,114	41.6	
Labour	John Cullen*	750	28.0	
Conservative	Christine Allcock	372	13.9	
Independent	Dave Kelly	234	8.7	
English Democrat	Chris Roscoe	210	7.8	
Majority		364		
Turnout		2,680	32.2	
Liberal Democrats gain from Labour		Swing		

2006
Party	Candidate	Votes	%	±%
Liberal Democrats	Joseph O'Neill	965	40.4	
Labour	Charles McIntyre	842	35.2	
Conservative	Christine Allcock	584	24.4	
Majority		123	5.2	
Turnout		2,391	29.1	−7.4
Liberal Democrats gain from Labour		Swing		

2004
Party	Candidate	Votes	%	±%
Labour	Douglas Daniels	1,158		
Labour	John Cullen	1,102		
Labour	Charles McIntyre	1,016		
Liberal Democrats	Karl Henshall	1,006		
Liberal Democrats	Joseph O'Neill	992		
Conservative	Catherine Edwards	954		
Conservative	George Woods	597		
Turnout		6,825	36.5	
Labour win (new seat)				
Labour win (new seat)				
Labour win (new seat)				
