= 2015 Salford City Council election =

2015 local election in England

Map of the results of the 2015 Salford council election. Labour in red and Conservatives in blue.

The 2015 Salford City Council election took place on 7 May 2015 to elect members of Salford City Council in England. This was the same day as other local elections, and the 2015 United Kingdom general election. The last time these seats were contested was in 2011.

The composition of the Council following the 2015 elections:

Party	Seats	±
Labour	52	0
Conservative	8	0

== Wards ==
The electoral division results listed below are based on the changes from the 2014 elections, not taking into account any mid-term by-elections or party defections. Asterisks denote incumbent Councillors seeking re-election.

=== Barton ward ===
Barton
Party	Candidate	Votes	%	±%
Labour	Michele Barnes	2,656	57.1	−3.9
Conservative	Robert Bingham	1,015	21.8	+2.0
Green	Linda Margaret Davies	435	9.4	N/A
BNP	Wayne Peter Tomlinson	271	5.8	N/A
TUSC	Andrew Carrs	226	4.9	−14.3
Majority		1,641	35.3	
Turnout		4,652	53.3	
Labour hold		Swing		

=== Boothstown & Ellenbrook ward ===
Boothstown and Ellenbrook
Party	Candidate	Votes	%	±%
Conservative	Robin Garrido*	2,924	57.8	+15.7
Labour	Lee Colin Rowbotham	1,580	31.2	+3.9
Green	Linda Margaret Davies	410	8.1	−1.6
TUSC	Wayne Peter Tomlinson	109	2.2	N/A
Majority		1,344	26.5	−15.6
Turnout		5,063	67.5	
Conservative hold		Swing		

=== Broughton ward ===
Broughton
Party	Candidate	Votes	%	±%
Labour	Charlie Mcintyre*	2,918	66.5	+6.6
Conservative	Yonie Saunders	720	16.4	+9.8
Green	David Jones	444	10.1	+3.3
TUSC	Alan Metcalfe	229	5.2	+3.1
Majority		2,198	50.1	+14.9
Turnout		4,391	47.1	
Labour hold		Swing		

=== Cadishead ward ===
Cadishead
Party	Candidate	Votes	%	±%
Labour	Jimmy Hunt*	2,506	55.6	−10.0
Conservative	Dorothy Chapman	1,315	29.2	+8.1
Green	Alan Dominic Valentine	405	9.0	N/A
TUSC	Diane Natalie Cawood	244	5.4	−2.2
Majority		1,191	26.4	−7.6
Turnout		4,505	55.4	
Labour hold		Swing		

=== Claremont ward ===
Claremont
Party	Candidate	Votes	%	±%
Labour	Joe Murphy*	2,335	45.1	+3.2
UKIP	Mary Ferrer	1,124	21.7	−9.1
Conservative	Bob Goodall	1,014	19.6	+4.4
Liberal Democrats	Ronnie Benjamin	315	6.1	+1.3
Green	Rene Iacopini	305	5.9	+0.4
TUSC	Matt Kilsby	80	1.5	−0.3
Majority		1,221	23.4	+12.3
Turnout		5,173	62.8	
Labour hold		Swing		

=== Eccles ward ===
Eccles
Party	Candidate	Votes	%	±%
Labour	Lisa Margaret Stone*	2,612	48.3	−14.3
Conservative	Linda Goodall	1,347	24.9	−14.1
UKIP	Robert Wakefield	739	13.7	N/A
Green	Emma Van Dyke	327	6.1	N/A
Liberal Democrats	Val Kelly	257	4.8	−4.8
TUSC	Sally Griffiths	122	2.3	N/A
Majority		1,265	23.4	−11.4
Turnout		5404	62.0	
Labour hold		Swing		

=== Irlam ward ===
Irlam
Party	Candidate	Votes	%	±%
Labour	Peter Taylor	1,935	50.0	−6.4
UKIP	Brian Norman Robinson	910	23.5	N/A
Conservative	Noel Gaskell	727	18.8	0.0
Green	Paul Scott Hardwick	215	5.6	N/A
TUSC	Eric Thorpe	47	1.2	N/A
Independent	Jackie Anderson	25	0.6	N/A
Majority		1,208	31.2	−6.4
Turnout		3,871	55.2	
Labour hold		Swing		

=== Irwell Riverside ward ===
Irwell Riverside
Party	Candidate	Votes	%	±%
Labour	Stephen Stuart Ord*	2,124	54.8	+5.5
UKIP	Katherine Alder	617	15.9	−6.0
Green	Wendy Olsen	537	13.8	+2.8
Conservative	Jessica Taberner	472	12.2	+3.0
TUSC	Jamie Carr	92	2.4	−2.8
BNP	Carl Lawson	37	1.0	−2.4
Majority		1,507	38.9	
Turnout		3,879	53.4	
Labour hold		Swing		

=== Kersal ward ===
Kersal
Party	Candidate	Votes	%	±%
Labour	Harry Davies	2,110	48.5	−6.2
Conservative	Arnold Saunders	1,872	43.0	+25.2
Green	Jason Reading	250	5.7	N/A
TUSC	Farid Norat	89	2.0	N/A
Majority		238	5.5	−21.6
Turnout		4,355	51.6	
Labour hold		Swing		

=== Langworthy ward ===
Langworthy
Party	Candidate	Votes	%	±%
Labour	Gina Claire Reynolds*	2,424	54.9	−3.0
UKIP	Andy Olsen	1,065	24.1	−16.8
Conservative	Nicky Turner	460	10.4	+0.8
Green	Ian Pattinson	341	7.7	N/A
TUSC	Sean Warren	98	2.2	N/A
Majority		1,359	30.8	+13.8
Turnout		4,412	52.0	
Labour hold		Swing		

=== Little Hulton ward ===
Little Hulton
Party	Candidate	Votes	%	±%
Labour	Kate Lewis	2,281	52.9	−7.8
UKIP	Stephen Ferrer	1,038	24.1	N/A
Conservative	Nathan Ian James	669	15.5	−2.8
TUSC	Terry Simmons	159	3.7	−17.3
Green	Kieren John Luke King	150	3.5	N/A
Majority		1,243	28.8	−10.9
Turnout		4,312	46.9	
Labour hold		Swing		

=== Ordsall ward ===
Ordsall
Party	Candidate	Votes	%	±%
Labour	Peter William Dobbs*	2,950	50.6	−4.8
Conservative	Jonathan Boot	1,224	21.0	+3.7
Green	Jim Alayo-Arnabat	825	14.1	−5.5
UKIP	Christopher Barnes	665	11.4	N/A
TUSC	Stephanie Vickers	146	2.5	−5.3
Majority		1,726	29.6	−6.3
Turnout		5,832	52.9	
Labour hold		Swing		

=== Pendlebury ward ===
Pendlebury
Party	Candidate	Votes	%	±%
Labour Co-op	John Ferguson*	2,501	48.5	−0.7
UKIP	Stacey Olsen	1,295	25.1	−6.4
Conservative	Glenis Purcell	1,024	19.9	+5.1
Green	Chrissy Brand	235	4.6	N/A
TUSC	Jake Newton	78	1.5	N/A
Majority		1,206	23.4	+5.7
Turnout		5,156	57.1	
Labour hold		Swing		

=== Swinton North ward ===
Swinton North
Party	Candidate	Votes	%	±%
Labour	Jim Dawson*	2,716	54.3	+4.8
UKIP	John Mark Deas	1,066	21.3	−7.2
Conservative	Sharon Bulmer	1,035	20.7	+3.0
TUSC	Norma Frances Parkinson-Green	163	3.3	N/A
Majority		1,650	33.0	+12.0
Turnout		5,006	59.3	
Labour hold		Swing		

=== Swinton South ward ===
Councillor Neil Blower subsequently became an Independent in February 2016.

Swinton South
Party	Candidate	Votes	%	±%
Labour	Neil Blower*	2,228	46.7	+5.2
UKIP	Joe O'Neill	1,086	22.8	−13.3
Conservative	Anne Broomhead	1,054	22.1	+4.1
Green	Sean Anthony Fairbrother	264	5.5	N/A
TUSC	Jill Royle	111	2.3	−2.2
Majority		1,142	24.0	+18.6
Turnout		4,767	57.6	
Labour hold		Swing		

=== Walkden North ward ===
Walkden North
Party	Candidate	Votes	%	±%
Labour	Samantha Bellamy	2,263	49.7	−14.1
UKIP	Bernie Gill	1,094	24.0	+16.5
Conservative	Daniel Hill	866	19	+3.6
Green	Usama Absar Ahmed	188	4.2	N/A
TUSC	Andrew Carrs	118	2.6	N/A
Majority		1,169	25.7	−22.7
Turnout		4,550	53.4	+23.6
Labour hold		Swing		

=== Walkden South ward ===
Walkden South
Party	Candidate	Votes	%	±%
Conservative	Iain Lindley*	2,162	41.4	−8.3
Labour	Rob Sharpe	1,969	37.7	−0.6
UKIP	Albert Redshaw	749	14.4	+9.8
Green	Thomas Dylan	238	4.6	N/A
TUSC	Tom Thurman	76	1.5	N/A
Majority		193	3.7	−7.5
Turnout		5,219	65.2	+20.9
Conservative hold		Swing		

=== Weaste & Seedley ward ===
Weaste and Seedley
Party	Candidate	Votes	%	±%
Labour	Paul Ronald Wilson*	2,279	46.0	−11.0
UKIP	Barrie Fallows	1,080	21.8	N/A
Conservative	Adam Charles Edward Kennaugh	813	16.4	−7.0
Green	Peter John Mulleady	353	7.1	N/A
Liberal Democrats	Robert Vaughan	285	5.8	N/A
TUSC	Paul Quinn	122	2.5	−17.2
Majority		1,199	24.2	−9.2
Turnout		4,952	55.8	
Labour hold		Swing		

=== Winton ward ===
Winton
Party	Candidate	Votes	%	±%
Labour	Paula Boshell*	2,693	56.1	+4.0
Conservative	George Andrew Darlington	1,020	21.2	+5.7
Independent	Paul Doyle	533	11.1	−9.0
Green	Helen Margaret Alker	330	6.9	N/A
TUSC	Stephen Cullen	182	3.8	N/A
Majority		1,673	34.8	+2.9
Turnout		4,802	55.5	
Labour hold		Swing		

=== Worsley ward ===
Worsley
Party	Candidate	Votes	%	±%
Conservative	Chris Clarkson*	3,054	52.5	+6.1
Labour	John Roberts	1,533	26.4	−4.4
UKIP	Andrew Townsend	770	13.2	+4.3
Green	Chris Bertenshaw	380	6.5	N/A
TUSC	Kit Watson	44	0.8	N/A
Majority		1,521	26.2	+10.5
Turnout		5,814	71.1	+27.5
Conservative hold		Swing		
