= Pendlebury (ward) =

- Electoral ward
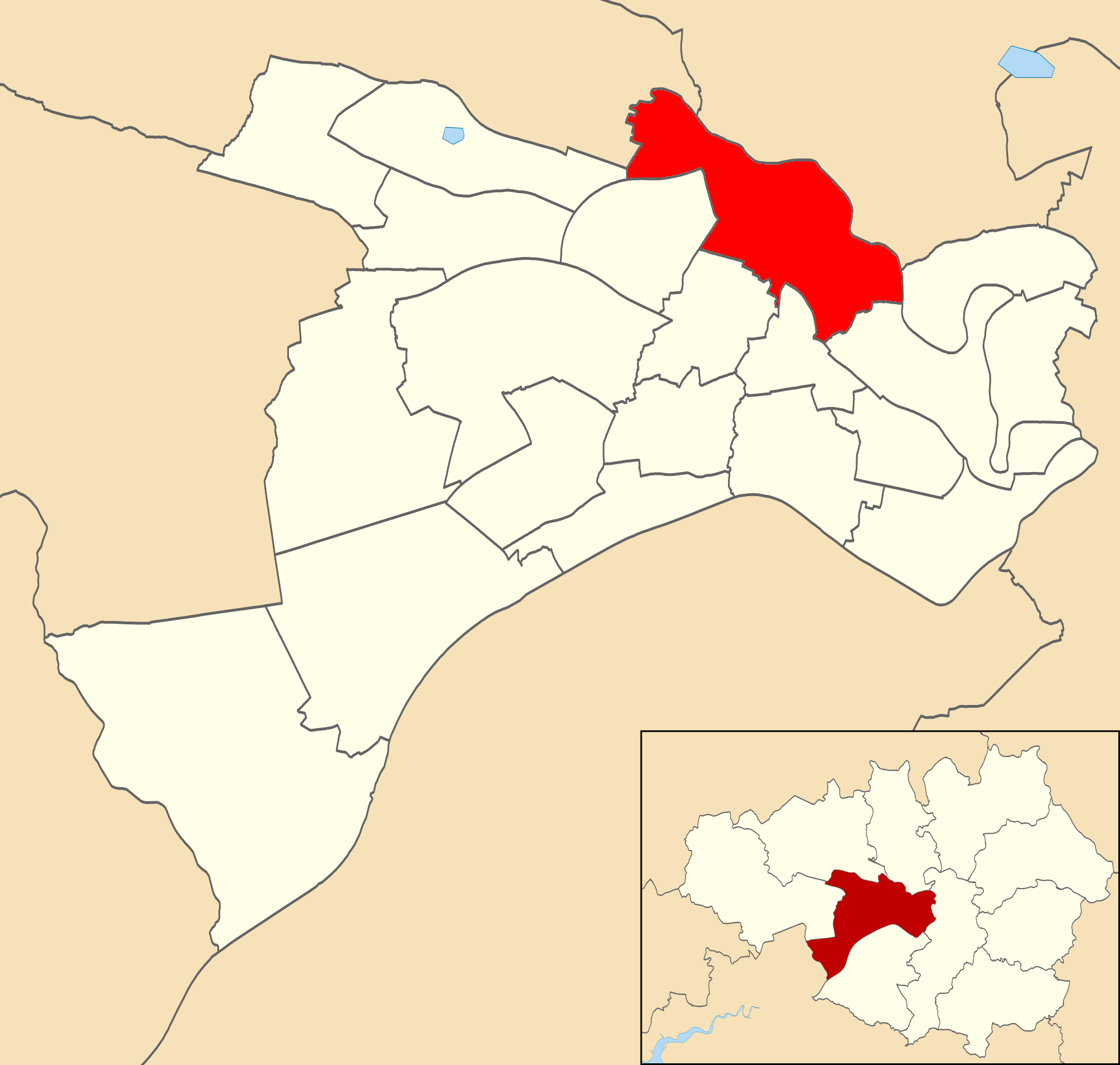
- Pendlebury ward within Salford City Council.

- Coat of arms
- Motto: Let the good (or safety) of the people be the supreme (or highest) law
- Interactive map of Pendlebury
- Coordinates: 53.5196°N 2.3211°W
- Country: United Kingdom
- Constituent country: England
- Region: North West England
- County: Greater Manchester
- Metropolitan borough: Salford
- Created: May 2004
- Abolished: May 2021
- Named for: Pendlebury

Government UK Parliament constituency: Salford and Eccles
  - Type: Unicameral
  - Body: Salford City Council
  - Mayor of Salford: Paul Dennett (Labour)

Population
  - Total: 13,434
- Ward profile conducted by Salford City Council in 2014.

Pendlebury was an electoral ward of Salford, England from May 2004 until May 2021. It was represented in Westminster by Rebecca Long-Bailey MP for Salford and Eccles. A profile of the ward conducted by Salford City Council in 2014 recorded a population of 13,434.

== Councillors ==
The ward was represented by three councillors:

Election	Councillor	Councillor	Councillor
2004	Bernard Lea (Lab Co-op)	Patricia Maureen Lea (Lab)	Barry Warner (Lab)
2006	Bernard Lea (Lab Co-op)	Patricia Maureen Lea (Lab)	Barry Warner (Lab)
2007	Bernard Lea (Lab Co-op)	Patricia Maureen Lea (Lab)	Barry Warner (Lab)
2008	Bernard Lea (Lab Co-op)	Patricia Maureen Lea (Lab)	Barry Warner (Lab)
By-election; 20 March 2009	Bernard Lea (Lab Co-op)	John Ferguson (Lab Co-op)	Barry Warner (Lab)
2010	Bernard Lea (Lab Co-op)	John Ferguson (Lab Co-op)	Barry Warner (Lab)
2011	Bernard Lea (Lab Co-op)	John Ferguson (Lab Co-op)	Barry Warner (Lab)
2012	Bernard Lea (Lab Co-op)	John Ferguson (Lab Co-op)	Barry Warner (Lab)
2014	Bernard Lea (Lab Co-op)	John Ferguson (Lab Co-op)	Barry Warner (Lab)
2015	Bernard Lea (Lab Co-op)	John Ferguson (Lab Co-op)	Barry Warner (Lab)
2016	Bernard Lea (Lab Co-op)	John Ferguson (Lab Co-op)	Barry Warner (Lab)
2018	Sophia Linden (Lab)	John Ferguson (Lab Co-op)	Barry Warner (Lab)
2019			
2021	Ward abolished		

indicates seat up for re-election. indicates seat won in by-election.

== Elections in 2010s ==
=== May 2018 ===
2018
Party	Candidate	Votes	%	±%
Labour	Sophia Linden	1,262	58.2	
Conservative	Dorothy Chapman	531	24.5	
Liberal Democrats	Beth Waller	151	7.0	
UKIP	Seamus Martin	147	6.8	
Green	Alastair Dewberry	79	3.6	
Majority		731	33.7	
Turnout		2,175	24.05	
Labour hold		Swing		

=== May 2016 ===
2016
Party	Candidate	Votes	%	±%
Labour	Barry Warner*	1,287	48.4	−0.1
UKIP	Andy Olsen	728	27.4	+2.3
Conservative	Jonathan Grosskopf	373	14.0	−5.9
Green	Paul Brighouse	161	6.1	+1.5
TUSC	Sean Warren	77	2.9	+1.4
The Republic Party	Stuart Cremins	21	0.8	N/A
Majority		559	21.0	−2.4
Turnout		2,660	29.9	−27.2
Labour hold		Swing		

=== May 2015 ===
2015
Party	Candidate	Votes	%	±%
Labour Co-op	John Ferguson*	2,501	48.5	−0.7
UKIP	Stacey Olsen	1,295	25.1	−6.4
Conservative	Glenis Purcell	1,024	19.9	+5.1
Green	Chrissy Brand	235	4.6	N/A
TUSC	Jake Newton	78	1.5	N/A
Majority		1,206	23.4	+5.7
Turnout		5,156	57.1	
Labour hold		Swing		

=== May 2014 ===
2014
Party	Candidate	Votes	%	±%
Labour	Bernard James Lea	1,360	49.2	
UKIP	Paul Frank Doyle	872	31.5	
Conservative	James William Ian Macdonald	410	14.8	
BNP	Eddy O'Sullivan	122	4.4	
Majority		488	17.7	
Turnout		2764		
Labour hold		Swing		

=== May 2012 ===
2012
Party	Candidate	Votes	%	±%
Labour	Barry Warner*	1,496	58.6	+21.7
Conservative	Christine Gray	396	15.5	−15.7
BNP	Wayne Taylor	240	9.4	−3.9
Community Action	Gillian Welsh	174	6.8	N/A
Green	Stuart Cremins	129	5.1	N/A
Liberal Democrats	Christine Corry	119	4.7	−9.5
Majority		1,100	43.1	
Turnout		2,578	27.5	−2.1
Labour hold		Swing		

=== May 2011 ===
2011
Party	Candidate	Votes	%	±%
Labour	John Ferguson	1,811	60.7	+14.6
Conservative	Keyth Scoles	539	18.1	−5.3
BNP	Wayne Taylor	204	6.8	−6.8
UKIP	John Brereton	184	6.2	N/A
Liberal Democrats	Christine Corry	161	5.3	−11.6
Independent politician	Stuart Cremins	85	2.8	N/A
Majority		1,272		
Turnout		3,001	33	
Labour hold		Swing		

=== May 2010 ===
2010
Party	Candidate	Votes	%	±%
Labour	Bernard Lea*	2,259	43.9	+7.0
Conservative	Keyth Scoles	1,102	21.4	−9.8
Liberal Democrats	Valerie Gregory	1,042	20.3	+6.1
BNP	Wayne Taylor	566	11.0	−2.3
Independent	Stuart Cremins	80	1.6	−2.8
Independent	Reg Howard	69	1.3	+1.3
Majority		1,157	22.5	+16.8
Turnout		5,143	57.5	+27.9
Labour hold		Swing		

== Elections in 2000s ==
By-election 19 March 2009
Party	Candidate	Votes	%	±%
Labour	John Ferguson	1,055	38.2	+1.3
Conservative	Jillian Collinson	874	31.6	+0.4
BNP	Eddy O'Sullivan	373	13.5	+0.2
Liberal Democrats	Paul Gregory	368	13.3	−0.9
Independent	Stuart Cremins	49	1.8	−2.6
Green	Diana Battersby	43	1.6	+1.6
Majority		181	6.6	
Turnout		2,762	30.7	
Labour hold		Swing		

2008
Party	Candidate	Votes	%	±%
Labour	Barry Warner	975	36.9	−9.2
Conservative	Peter Allcock	826	31.2	+7.9
Liberal Democrats	Christine Corry	375	14.2	−2.8
BNP	Wayne Taylor	352	13.3	−0.3
Independent	Stuart Cremins	117	4.4	(+4.4)
Majority		149	5.7	
Turnout			29.6	
Labour hold		Swing		

2007
Party	Candidate	Votes	%	±%
Labour	Maureen Lea*	1,167	46.1	
Conservative	Peter Allcock	592	23.4	
Liberal Democrats	Katherine Ferrer	429	16.9	
BNP	Wayne Taylor	344	13.6	
Majority		575		
Turnout		2,532	28.8	
Labour hold		Swing		

2006
Party	Candidate	Votes	%	±%
Labour	Bernard Lea	1,143	49.1	
Conservative	Peter Allcock	643	27.6	
Liberal Democrats	Christine Corry	543	23.3	
Majority		500	21.5	
Turnout		2,329	27.4	−7.7
Labour hold		Swing		

2004
Party	Candidate	Votes	%	±%
Labour	Barry Warner	1,207		
Labour	Patricia Lea	1,096		
Labour	Bernard Lea	1,000		
Liberal Democrats	Margaret Ferrer	872		
Conservative	John Booth	707		
Conservative	Bridie Madden	674		
Turnout		5,556	35.1	
Labour win (new seat)				
Labour win (new seat)				
Labour win (new seat)				
