= Little Hulton (ward) =

- Electoral ward
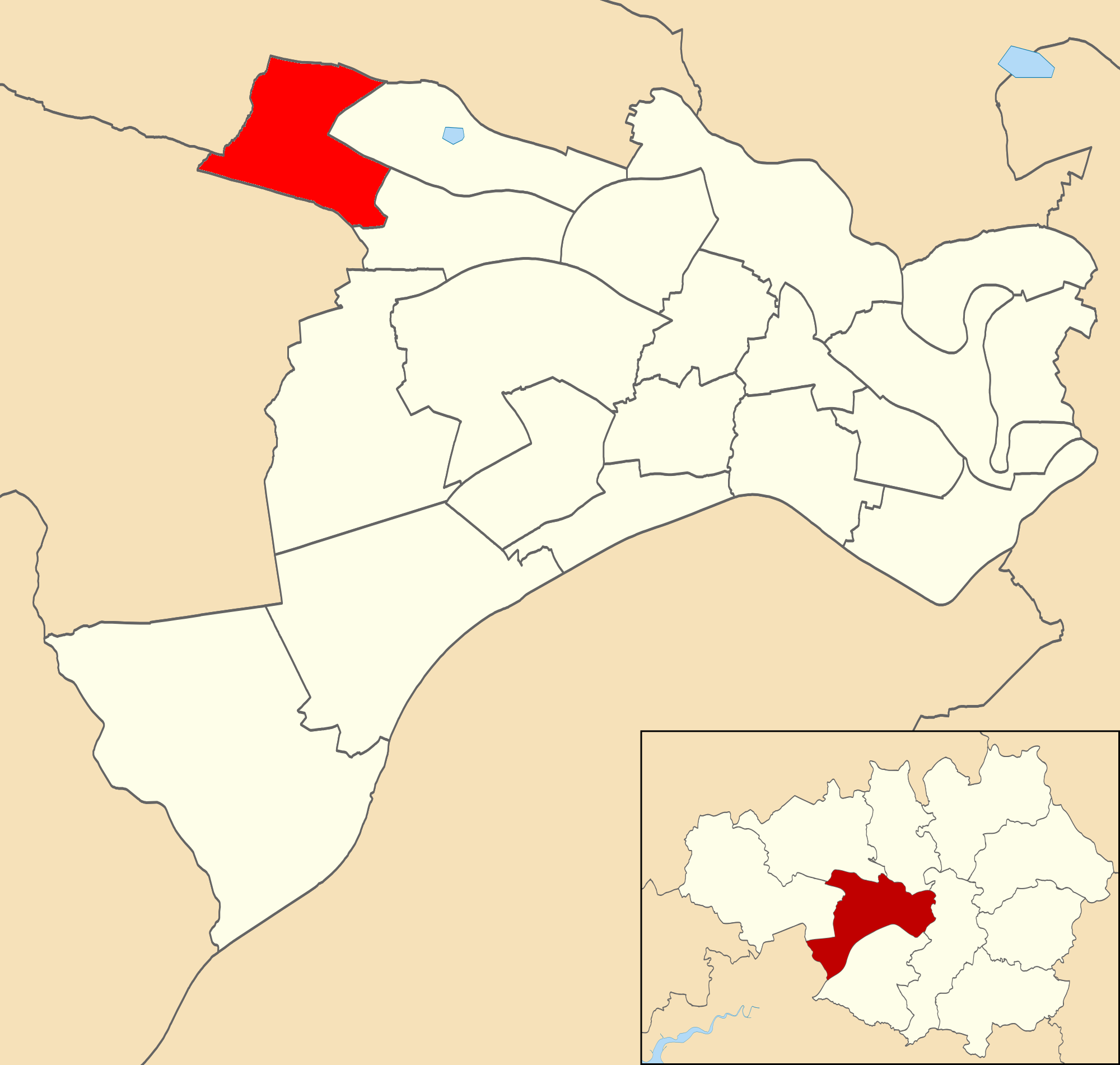
- Little Hulton ward within Salford City Council.

- Coat of arms
- Motto: Let the good (or safety) of the people be the supreme (or highest) law
- Interactive map of Little Hulton
- Coordinates: 53.5301°N 2.4291°W
- Country: United Kingdom
- Constituent country: England
- Region: North West England
- County: Greater Manchester
- Metropolitan borough: Salford
- Created: May 2004
- Named for: Little Hulton

Government UK Parliament constituency: Worsley and Eccles South
  - Type: Unicameral
  - Body: Salford City Council
  - Mayor of Salford: Paul Dennett (Labour)
  - Councillor: Teresa Pepper (Labour)
  - Councillor: Tony Davies (Labour)
  - Councillor: Rob Sharpe (Labour)

Population
  - Total: 13,469
- Ward profile conducted by Salford City Council in 2014.

Little Hulton is an electoral ward of Salford, England. It is represented in Westminster by Yasmin Quereshi MP for Bolton South and Walkden. A profile of the ward conducted by Salford City Council in 2014 recorded a population of 13,469.

== Councillors ==
The ward is represented by three councillors:

- Teresa Pepper (Lab)
- Tony Davies (Lab)
- Rob Sharpe (Lab)

Election	Councillor	Councillor	Councillor
2004	Eric Burgoyne (Lab)	Alice Smyth (Lab)	Doris Fernandez (Lab)
2006	Eric Burgoyne (Lab)	Alice Smyth (Lab)	Pat Ryan (Lab)
2007	Eric Burgoyne (Lab)	Alice Smyth (Lab)	Pat Ryan (Lab)
2008	Eric Burgoyne (Lab)	Alice Smyth (Lab)	Pat Ryan (Lab)
2010	Eric Burgoyne (Lab)	Alice Smyth (Lab)	Pat Ryan (Lab)
2011	Eric Burgoyne (Lab)	Val Burgoyne (Lab)	Pat Ryan (Lab)
2012	Eric Burgoyne (Lab)	Val Burgoyne (Lab)	Pat Ryan (Lab)
2014	Eric Burgoyne (Lab)	Val Burgoyne (Lab)	Pat Ryan (Lab)
2015	Eric Burgoyne (Lab)	Kate Lewis (Lab)	Pat Ryan (Lab)
2016	Colette Weir (Lab)	Kate Lewis (Lab)	Rob Sharpe (Lab)
2018	Colette Weir (Lab)	Kate Lewis (Lab)	Rob Sharpe (Lab)
2019	Colette Weir (Lab)	Kate Lewis (Lab)	Rob Sharpe (Lab)
2021	Colette Weir (Lab)	Kate Lewis (Lab)	Rob Sharpe (Lab)
2022	Teresa Pepper (Lab)	Kate Lewis (Lab)	Rob Sharpe (Lab)
2023	Teresa Pepper (Lab)	Kate Lewis (Lab)	Rob Sharpe (Lab)

indicates seat up for re-election.

== Elections in 2020s ==
=== May 2021 ===
2021
Party	Candidate	Votes	%	±%
Labour	Kate Lewis	1,115	62.3	N/A
Labour	Rob Sharpe	905	50.6	N/A
Labour	Colette Weir	709	39.6	N/A
Conservative	Dorothy Chapman	438	24.5	N/A
Green	Stuart Oxbrow	318	17.8	N/A
Conservative	Adrees Masood	236	13.2	N/A
Turnout		3721	19.52	N/A
Labour win (new seat)				
Labour win (new seat)				
Labour win (new seat)				

== Elections in 2010s ==
=== May 2019 ===
2019
Party	Candidate	Votes	%	±%
Labour	Kate Lewis*	933	50.73	
UKIP	Michael Frost	441	23.98	
Conservative	Lewis Leach	243	13.21	
Green	Fredrick Roy Battersby	215	11.69	
Majority		492	26.75	
Turnout		1,839	19.7	
Labour hold		Swing		

=== May 2018 ===
2018
Party	Candidate	Votes	%	±%
Labour	Collette Weir*	1,186	67.4	
Conservative	Nathan James	461	26.2	
Liberal Democrats	Lee Westley	113	6.4	
Majority		725	41.2	
Turnout		1,771	19.88	
Labour hold		Swing		

=== May 2016 ===
2016
Party	Candidate	Votes	%	±%
Labour	Robert Andrew Sharpe	1,171	30.6	
Labour	Colette Weir	837	21.7	
UKIP	Phil Bridge	648	16.9	
UKIP	Bod Skoczypec	416	10.9	
Conservative	Nathan Ian James	317	8.3	
Conservative	Matthew William Lightfoot	229	6.0	
Green	Frederick Roy Battersby	210	5.5	
Turnout		3,828	21.0	−25.9
Labour hold		Swing		
Labour hold		Swing		

=== May 2015 ===
2015
Party	Candidate	Votes	%	±%
Labour	Kate Lewis	2,281	52.9	−7.8
UKIP	Stephen Ferrer	1,038	24.1	N/A
Conservative	Nathan Ian James	669	15.5	−2.8
TUSC	Terry Simmons	159	3.7	−17.3
Green	Kieren John Luke King	150	3.5	N/A
Majority		1,243	28.8	−10.9
Turnout		4,312	46.9	
Labour hold		Swing		

=== May 2014 ===
2014
Party	Candidate	Votes	%	±%
Labour	Eric Burgoyne	1,331	60.7	
TUSC	Terry Simmons	460	21.0	
Conservative	Alexandra Paterson	401	18.3	
Majority		871	39.7	
Turnout		2192		
Labour hold		Swing		

=== May 2012 ===
2012
Party	Candidate	Votes	%	±%
Labour	Pat Ryan*	1,288	75.1	+28.3
Conservative	Con Wright	272	15.9	−6.5
Liberal Democrats	David Cowpe	155	9.0	−3.3
Majority		1,016	59.2	
Turnout		1,755	19.1	−4.6
Labour hold		Swing		

=== May 2011 ===
2011
Party	Candidate	Votes	%	±%
Labour	Val Burgoyne	1,522	66.5	+13.5
Conservative	Con Wright	297	13.0	−3.2
English Democrat	David Johnson	200	8.7	N/A
UKIP	Ian Smith	165	7.2	N/A
Liberal Democrats	David Cowpe	106	4.6	−12.4
Majority		1,225		
Turnout		1,225	29.3	
Labour hold		Swing		

=== May 2010 ===
2010
Party	Candidate	Votes	%	±%
Labour	Eric Burgoyne*	2,260	55.7	+8.9
Liberal Democrats	David Cowpe	898	22.2	+9.8
Conservative	Con Wright	852	21.0	−1.4
Majority		1,362	33.6	+9.2
Turnout		4,054	45.4	+21.0
Labour hold		Swing		

== Elections in 2000s ==
2008
Party	Candidate	Votes	%	±%
Labour	Pat Ryan	1,021	46.8	−6.2
Conservative	Elaine West	488	22.4	+6.2
BNP	Vinnie Coleman	404	18.5	+4.6
Liberal Democrats	Susan Carson	270	12.4	−4.6
Majority		533	24.4	
Turnout			23.7	
Labour hold		Swing		

2007
Party	Candidate	Votes	%	±%
Labour	Alice Smyth*	1,050	53.0	
Liberal Democrats	David Cowpe	337	17.0	
Conservative	Andrew Cheetham	321	16.2	
BNP	Vinnie Coleman	275	13.9	
Majority		713		
Turnout		1,983	22.4	
Labour hold		Swing		

2006
Party	Candidate	Votes	%	±%
Labour	Eric Burgoyne	890		
Labour	Patricia Ryan	862		
Liberal Democrats	David Cowpe	375		
Conservative	Nicolette Turner	341		
Liberal Democrats	Thomas Fernley	296		
Conservative	Elaine West	274		
Turnout		3,038	19.8	−11.0
Labour hold		Swing		

2004
Party	Candidate	Votes	%	±%
Labour	Kate Lewis	2,281	52.9	−7.8
UKIP	Stephen Ferrer	1,038	24.1	N/A
Conservative	Nathan Ian James	669	15.5	−2.8
TUSC	Terry Simmons	159	3.7	−17.3
Green	Kieren John Luke King	150	3.5	N/A
Majority		1,243	28.8	−10.9
Turnout		4,312	46.9	
Labour hold		Swing		
