= Walkden South =

- Electoral ward
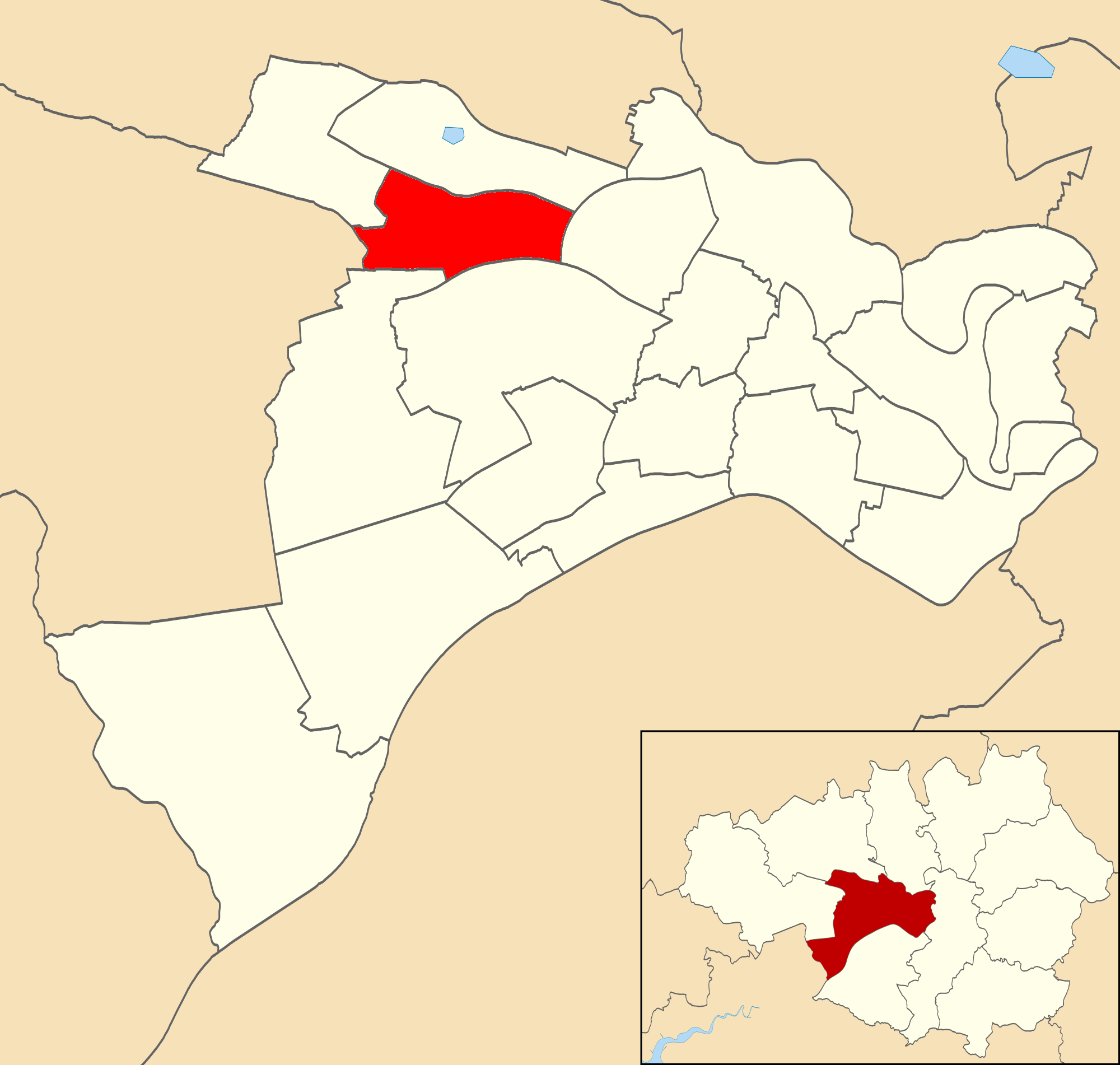
- Walkden South ward within Salford City Council.

- Coat of arms
- Motto: Let the good (or safety) of the people be the supreme (or highest) law
- Interactive map of Walkden South
- Coordinates: 53.5198°N 2.3963°W
- Country: United Kingdom
- Constituent country: England
- Region: North West England
- County: Greater Manchester
- Metropolitan borough: Salford
- Created: May 2004
- Named for: Southern Walkden

Government UK Parliament constituency: Worsley and Eccles South
  - Type: Unicameral
  - Body: Salford City Council
  - Mayor of Salford: Paul Dennett (Labour)
  - Councillor: Irfan Syed (Labour)
  - Councillor: Joshua Brooks (Labour)
  - Councillor: Hilaria Asumu (Labour and Co-operative)

Population
  - Total: 11,715
- Ward profile conducted by Salford City Council

Walkden South is an area and electoral ward of Salford, England. It is represented in Westminster by Yasmin Quereshi MP for Bolton South and Walkden. The 2021 Census recorded a ward population of 11,715.

== Councillors ==
The ward is represented by three councillors:

- Councillor Irfan Syed (Labour)
- Councillor Joshua Brooks (Labour)
- Councillor Hilaria Asumu (Labour and Co-Operative)

Councillor Syed is an Advisor to the social enterprise Visible Outcomes 4U Limited. His partner is listed as a Director, along with fellow Salford City Councillor Wilson Nkurunziza. Councillor Syed is Chair of the Salford City Council Health and Adults Scrutiny Committee.

Councillor Joshua Brooks works at the IT company CDW Limited. He is a school governor at St Joseph the Worker Roman Catholic Primary School and Treasurer of Friends of Walkden Station.

Councillor Hilaria Asumu is a Director of a childcare business called SafeHausUK, at her home in Worsley village. Her partner works at Manchester University and the NHS.

| Election | Councillor | Councillor | Councillor |
|---|---|---|---|
| 2004 | David Lewis (Con) | Iain Lindley (Con) | Stanley Witkowski (Lab) |
| 2006 | Les Turner (Con) | Iain Lindley (Con) | Stanley Witkowski (Lab) |
| 2007 | Les Turner (Con) | Iain Lindley (Con) | Stanley Witkowski (Lab) |
| 2008 | Les Turner (Con) | Iain Lindley (Con) | Nicky Turner (Con) |
| 2010 | Les Turner (Con) | Iain Lindley (Con) | Nicky Turner (Con) |
| 2011 | Les Turner (Con) | Iain Lindley (Con) | Nicky Turner (Con) |
| 2012 | Les Turner (Con) | Iain Lindley (Con) | Richard Critchley (Lab) |
| 2014 | Les Turner (Con) | Iain Lindley (Con) | Richard Critchley (Lab) |
| 2015 | Les Turner (Con) | Iain Lindley (Con) | Richard Critchley (Lab) |
| 2016 | Les Turner (Con) | Iain Lindley (Con) | Richard Critchley (Lab) |
| 2018 | Laura Edwards (Lab) | Iain Lindley (Con) | Richard Critchley (Lab) |
| 2019 | Joshua Brooks (Lab) | Laura Edwards (Lab) | Richard Critchley (Lab) |
| 2021 | Joshua Brooks (Lab) | Irfan Syed (Lab) | Margaret Ann Morris (Lab) |
| 2022 | Joshua Brooks (Lab) | Irfan Syed (Lab) | Margaret Ann Morris (Lab) |
| 2023 | Joshua Brooks (Lab) | Irfan Syed (Lab) | Hilaria Asumu (Lab) |
| 2024 | Joshua Brooks (Lab) | Irfan Syed (Lab) | Hilaria Asumu (Lab) |

indicates seat up for re-election.

== Elections in the 2020s ==
=== May 2024 ===
2024
| Party | Candidate | Votes | % | ±% |
|---|---|---|---|---|
| Labour | Joshua Brooks* | 1,575 | 52.3 | +30.8 |
| Green | Tom Dylan | 244 | 8.1 | −10.1 |
| Liberal Democrats | Rowan Cerys Blessing | 140 | 4.7 | −2.4 |
| Conservative | Christopher Alan Bates | 740 | 24.6 | N/A |
| Independent | Paul Whitelegg | 311 | 10.3 | N/A |
| Majority | | 835 | 27.7 | +5.2 |
| Turnout | | 3,034 | 33.06 | +4.96 |
| Labour hold | | | | |

=== May 2023 ===
2023
| Party | Candidate | Votes | % | ±% |
|---|---|---|---|---|
| Labour | Hilaria Asumu | 1,318 | 52.6 | N/A |
| Green | Anna Elizabeth Mackinlay Totterdill | 257 | 10.2 | N/A |
| Liberal Democrats | Rowan Cerys Blessing | 178 | 7.1 | N/A |
| Conservative | Janet Hainey | 754 | 30.1 | N/A |
| Majority | | 564 | 22.5 | N/A |
| Turnout | | 2,532 | 28.1 | −2.5 |
| Labour hold | | | | |

=== May 2022 ===
2022
| Party | Candidate | Votes | % | ±% |
|---|---|---|---|---|
| Labour | Irfan Syed* | 1,281 | 47 | +33.5 |
| Green | Thomas Matthew Dylan | 494 | 18.2 | +11.9 |
| Liberal Democrats | Patricia Ann Murphy | 271 | 10 | N/A |
| Conservative | Azmat Husain | 674 | 24.8 | N/A |
| Majority | | 607 | 22 | +21.4 |
| Turnout | | 2,739 | 30.61 | −4.9 |
| Labour hold | | | | |

=== May 2021 ===
2021
| Party | Candidate | Votes | % | ±% |
|---|---|---|---|---|
| Labour | Irfan Syed | 1,066 | 13.5 | N/A |
| Labour | Margaret Ann Morris | 1,347 | 17.0 | N/A |
| Labour | Joshua Brooks* | 1,703 | 21.5 | N/A |
| Conservative | Lewis Croden | 1060 | 13.4 | N/A |
| Green | Thomas Matthew Dylan | 501 | 6.3 | N/A |
| Liberal Democrats | Susan Lewis | 259 | 3.3 | N/A |
| Conservative | Jason Thomas Gallagher | 978 | 12.3 | N/A |
| Conservative | Chris Midgley | 1014 | 12.8 | N/A |
| Majority | | 6 | 0.6 | −6.7 |
| Turnout | | 7928 | 35.47 | +11.77 |
| Labour hold | | | | |
| Labour hold | | | | |
| Labour hold | | | | |

== Elections in the 2010s ==
=== June 2019 ===
Election deferred due to the death of a candidate

2019
| Party | Candidate | Votes | % | ±% |
|---|---|---|---|---|
| Labour | Joshua Brooks | 802 | 39.6% | |
| Conservative | David Cawdrey | 654 | 32.3% | |
| Green | Thomas Matthew Dylan | 254 | 12.6% | +7.1 |
| Liberal Democrats | John-Paul Atley | 173 | 8.6% | |
| UKIP | Tony Green | 140 | 6.9% | |
| Majority | | 148 | 7.3 | −3.2 |
| Turnout | | 2030 | 23.7 | −11.6 |
| Labour hold | | | | |

=== May 2018 ===
2018
| Party | Candidate | Votes | % | ±% |
|---|---|---|---|---|
| Labour | Laura Edwards | 1,460 | 50.5 | |
| Conservative | Anne Broomhead | 1,157 | 40.0 | |
| Green | Thomas Dylan | 159 | 5.5 | |
| Liberal Democrats | David Cowpe | 113 | 3.9 | |
| Majority | | 303 | 10.5 | |
| Turnout | | 2,895 | 35.30 | |
| Labour gain from Conservative | | Swing | | |

=== May 2016 ===
2016
| Party | Candidate | Votes | % | ±% |
|---|---|---|---|---|
| Labour | Richard John Critchley* | 1,421 | 43.4 | +5.7 |
| Conservative | Anne Susan Broomhead | 1,266 | 38.6 | −2.8 |
| UKIP | Ann Lord | 390 | 11.9 | −2.5 |
| Green | Thomas Matthew Dylan | 149 | 4.5 | +0.1 |
| TUSC | Jamie Carr | 29 | 0.9 | −0.6 |
| Majority | | 155 | 4.7 | |
| Turnout | | 3,276 | 41.8 | −23.4 |
| Labour hold | | Swing | | |

=== May 2015 ===
2015
| Party | Candidate | Votes | % | ±% |
|---|---|---|---|---|
| Conservative | Iain Lindley* | 2,162 | 41.4 | −8.3 |
| Labour | Rob Sharpe | 1,969 | 37.7 | −0.6 |
| UKIP | Albert Redshaw | 749 | 14.4 | +9.8 |
| Green | Thomas Dylan | 238 | 4.6 | N/A |
| TUSC | Thomas Thurman | 76 | 1.5 | N/A |
| Majority | | 193 | 3.7 | −7.5 |
| Turnout | | 5,219 | 65.2 | +20.9 |
| Conservative hold | | Swing | | |

=== May 2014 ===
2014
| Party | Candidate | Votes | % | ±% |
|---|---|---|---|---|
| Conservative | Les Turner* | 1,186 | 38 | +0.1 |
| Labour | Robert Andrew Sharpe | 1,105 | 35.5 | +1.5 |
| UKIP | Albert Redshaw | 626 | 20.1 | N/A |
| Green | Matthew J R Clark | 145 | 4.7 | N/A |
| English Democrat | Paul Whitelegg | 55 | 1.8 | −2 |
| Majority | | 81 | 2.6 | −1.3 |
| Turnout | | | | |
| Conservative hold | | Swing | | |

=== May 2012 ===
2012
| Party | Candidate | Votes | % | ±% |
|---|---|---|---|---|
| Labour | Richard Critchley | 1,169 | 40.1 | +15.1 |
| Conservative | Anne Broomhead | 1,116 | 38.3 | −12.3 |
| UKIP | Albert Redshaw | 269 | 9.2 | N/A |
| Green | Diana Battersby | 159 | 5.5 | N/A |
| Liberal Democrats | Susan Carson | 105 | 3.6 | −10.5 |
| English Democrat | Paul Whitelegg | 88 | 3.0 | N/A |
| Majority | | 53 | 1.8 | |
| Turnout | | 2,943 | 35.9 | −4.4 |
| Labour gain from Conservative | | Swing | | |

=== May 2011 ===
2011
| Party | Candidate | Votes | % | ±% |
|---|---|---|---|---|
| Conservative | Iain Lindley* | 1,784 | 49.7 | −1.3 |
| Labour | Tracy Kelly | 1,379 | 38.4 | +11.3 |
| UKIP | Albert Redshaw | 167 | 4.7 | N/A |
| Liberal Democrats | Susan Carson | 142 | 4.0 | −4.9 |
| English Democrat | Paul Whitelegg | 117 | 3.3 | N/A |
| Majority | | 405 | 11.3 | +7.4 |
| Turnout | | | 44.3 | |

=== May 2010 ===
2010
| Party | Candidate | Votes | % | ±% |
|---|---|---|---|---|
| Conservative | Les Turner* | 2,026 | 37.7 | −12.9 |
| Labour | Brendan Ryan | 1,815 | 33.8 | +8.8 |
| Liberal Democrats | Pauline Ogden | 1,015 | 18.9 | +4.8 |
| BNP | Tommy Cavanagh | 285 | 5.3 | −5.0 |
| English Democrat | Paul Whitelegg | 203 | 3.8 | +3.8 |
| Majority | | 211 | 3.9 | −21.7 |
| Turnout | | 5,373 | 66.7 | +26.4 |
| Conservative hold | | Swing | | |

== Elections in the 2000s ==
=== May 2008 ===
2008
| Party | Candidate | Votes | % | ±% |
|---|---|---|---|---|
| Conservative | Nicky Turner | 1,649 | 50.6 | −0.4 |
| Labour | Brendan Ryan | 815 | 25.0 | −2.1 |
| Liberal Democrats | Pauline Ogden | 458 | 14.1 | +5.2 |
| BNP | Tommy Cavanagh | 336 | 10.3 | +3.0 |
| Majority | | 834 | 25.6 | |
| Turnout | | | 40.3 | |
| Conservative gain from Labour | | Swing | | |

=== May 2007 ===
2007
| Party | Candidate | Votes | % | ±% |
|---|---|---|---|---|
| Conservative | Iain Lindley* | 1,578 | 51.0 | |
| Labour | Adrian Brocklehurst | 839 | 27.1 | |
| Liberal Democrats | Susan Carson | 274 | 8.9 | |
| BNP | Tommy Cavanagh | 225 | 7.3 | |
| Green | Simon Battersby | 179 | 5.8 | |
| Majority | | 739 | | |
| Turnout | | 3,095 | 38.2 | |
| Conservative hold | | Swing | | |

=== May 2006 ===
2006
| Party | Candidate | Votes | % | ±% |
|---|---|---|---|---|
| Conservative | Leslie Turner | 1,385 | 47.5 | |
| Labour | Adrian Brocklehurst | 900 | 30.9 | |
| Liberal Democrats | Pauline Ogden | 632 | 21.7 | |
| Majority | | 485 | 16.6 | |
| Turnout | | 2,917 | 38.9 | −1.8 |
| Conservative hold | | Swing | | |

=== May 2004 ===
2004
| Party | Candidate | Votes | % | ±% |
|---|---|---|---|---|
| Labour | Stanley Witkowski | 1,031 | | |
| Conservative | Iain Lindley | 1,010 | | |
| Conservative | David Lewis | 1,008 | | |
| Conservative | Glenis Purcell | 978 | | |
| Labour | Valerie Burgoyne | 928 | | |
| Liberal Democrats | Deborah Rushton | 921 | | |
| Labour | Norbert Potter | 858 | | |
| Liberal Democrats | John Grant | 855 | | |
| Liberal Democrats | Peter Brown | 825 | | |
| Independent | David Bowers | 222 | | |
| Turnout | | 8,636 | 40.7 | |
| Labour win (new seat) | | | | |
| Conservative win (new seat) | | | | |
| Conservative win (new seat) | | | | |
