= Langworthy (ward) =

- Electoral ward
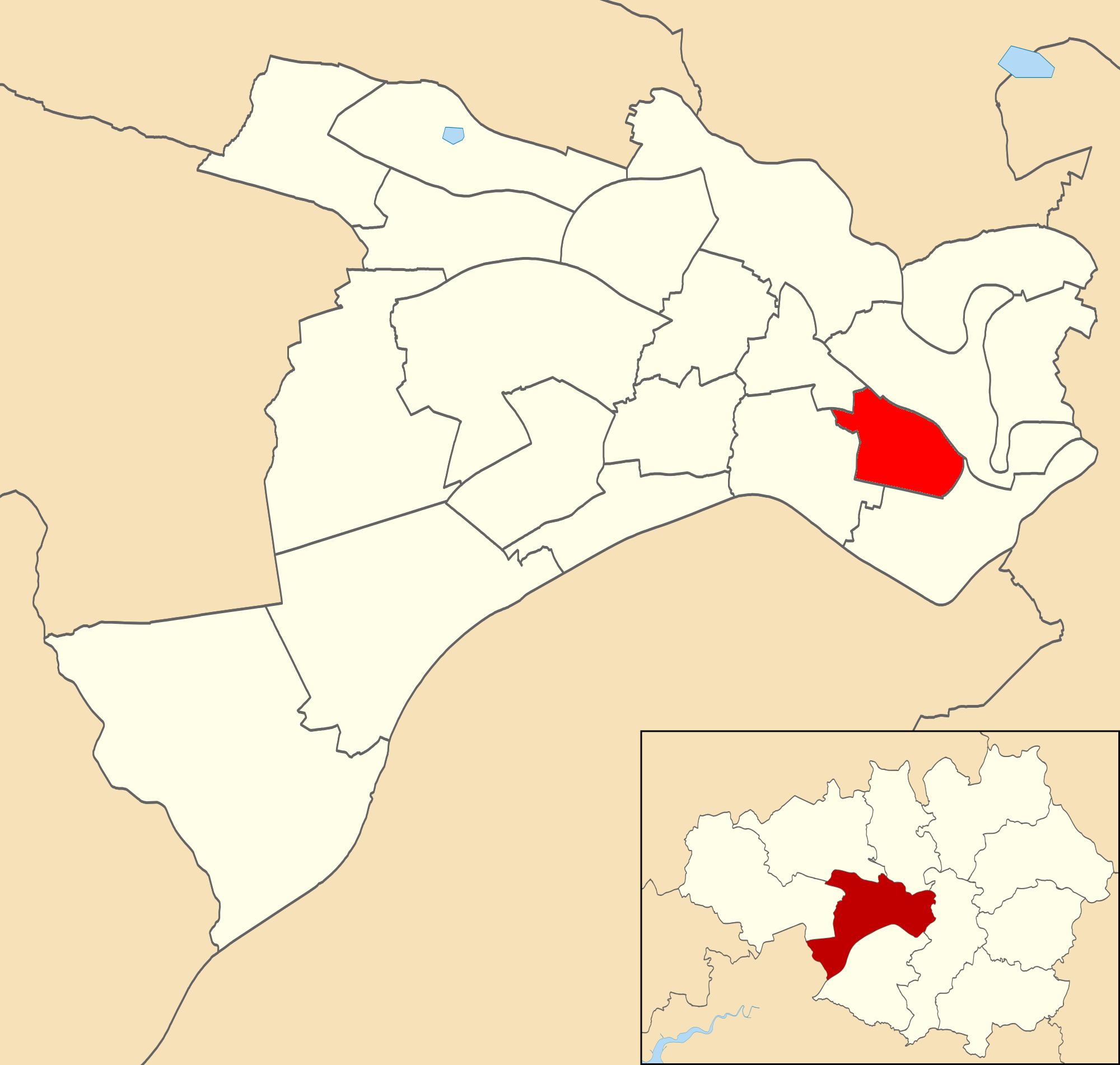
- Langworthy ward within Salford City Council.

- Coat of arms
- Motto: Let the good (or safety) of the people be the supreme (or highest) law
- Interactive map of Langworthy
- Coordinates: 53.4870°N 2.2910°W
- Country: United Kingdom
- Constituent country: England
- Region: North West England
- County: Greater Manchester
- Metropolitan borough: Salford
- Created: May 2004
- Abolished: 6 May 2021
- Named for: Langworthy

Government UK Parliament constituency: Salford and Eccles
  - Type: Unicameral
  - Body: Salford City Council

Population
  - Total: 12,980
- Ward profile conducted by Salford City Council in 2014.

Langworthy was an electoral ward of Salford City Council, in North-West England, located in the constituency of Salford and Eccles. A profile of the ward conducted by Salford City Council in 2014 recorded a population of 12,980.

The ward was abolished in 2021 as part of a boundary review conducted by the Local Government Boundary Commission for England.

== Councillors ==
The ward was represented by three councillors elected for four year terms.

Election	Councillor	Councillor	Councillor
2004	John Warmisham (Lab)	Jane Hepworth (Lab)	Andrew Salmon (Lab)
2006	John Warmisham (Lab)	Jane Hepworth (Lab)	Andrew Salmon (Lab)
2007	John Warmisham (Lab)	Gina Loveday (Lab)	Andrew Salmon (Lab)
2008	John Warmisham (Lab)	Gina Loveday (Lab)	Lynn Drake (Lib Dem)
2010	John Warmisham (Lab)	Gina Loveday (Lab)	Lynn Drake (Lib Dem)
2011	John Warmisham (Lab)	Gina Loveday (Lab)	Lynn Drake (Lib Dem)
2012	John Warmisham (Lab)	Gina Loveday (Lab)	Paul Dennett (Lab)
2014	John Warmisham (Lab)	Gina Loveday (Lab)	Paul Dennett (Lab)
2015	John Warmisham (Lab)	Gina Reynolds (Lab)	Paul Dennett (Lab)
2016	John Warmisham (Lab)	Gina Reynolds (Lab)	Paul Longshaw (Lab)
By-election; 14 December 2017	John Warmisham (Lab)	Gina Reynolds (Lab)	Wilson Nkurunziza (Lab)
2018	John Warmisham (Lab)	Gina Reynolds (Lab)	Wilson Nkurunziza (Lab)
2019	John Warmisham (Lab)	Gina Reynolds (Lab)	Wilson Nkurunziza (Lab)

indicates seat up for re-election. indicates seat won in a by-election.

== Elections in 2010s ==
=== May 2019 ===
2019
Party	Candidate	Votes	%	±%
Labour	Gina Claire Reynolds*	911	56.8	
UKIP	Seamus Martin	347	21.6	
Conservative	Alan Lederberger	132	8.2	
Liberal Democrats	Joe Johnson-Tod	115	7.2	
For Britain	Neil Joseph James	70	4.4	
Socialist Alternative	Dane Yates	29	1.8	
Majority		564		
Turnout		1,797	20.33	
Labour hold		Swing		

=== May 2018 ===
2018
Party	Candidate	Votes	%	±%
Labour	John Warmisham*	1,055	60.8	
Conservative	Craig Thompson	202	11.6	
Liberal Democrats	Jake Overend	183	10.6	
UKIP	Stacey Olsen	147	8.5	
Green	Ian Pattinson	147	8.5	
Majority		853	49.2	
Turnout		1,741	19.54	
Labour hold		Swing		

=== By-election December 2017 ===
Langworthy by-election, 14 December 2017
Party	Candidate	Votes	%	±%
Labour	Wilson Nkurunziza	601	57.7	
Conservative	James Ian Mount	183	17.6	
Liberal Democrats	Jake Overend	125	12.0	
Green	Ian Pattinson	72	6.9	
Independent	Michael James Felse	55	5.3	
Majority		476	45.7	
Turnout		1,034	11.8	
Labour hold		Swing		

=== May 2016 ===
2016
Party	Candidate	Votes	%	±%
Labour	Paul Anthony Longshaw	1,142	48.5	−6.4
UKIP	Christopher Barnes	586	24.9	+0.8
Independent	Mark Breeze	264	11.2	N/A
Conservative	Ian Macdoland	151	6.4	−4.0
Green	Ian Pattinson	139	5.9	−1.8
TUSC	Andrew Carss	45	1.9	−0.3
Majority		556	23.6	−7.2
Turnout		2,353	27.6	−24.4
Labour hold		Swing		

=== May 2015 ===
2015
Party	Candidate	Votes	%	±%
Labour	Gina Claire Reynolds*	2,424	54.9	−3.0
UKIP	Andy Olsen	1,065	24.1	−16.8
Conservative	Nicky Turner	460	10.4	+0.8
Green	Ian Pattinson	341	7.7	N/A
TUSC	Sean Warren	98	2.2	N/A
Majority		1,359	30.8	+13.8
Turnout		4,412	52.0	
Labour hold		Swing		

=== May 2014 ===
2014
Party	Candidate	Votes	%	±%
Labour	John David Warmisham	1,250	57.9	
UKIP	Andy Olsen	884	40.9	
Conservative	Arnold Saunders	207	9.6	
BNP	Kay Pollitt	86	4.0	
Motorcycle Alliance Party	Mike Yarwood	50	2.3	
Majority		366	17.0	
Turnout		2,159	22.8	−2.1
Labour hold		Swing		

=== May 2012 ===
2012
Party	Candidate	Votes	%	±%
Labour	Paul Dennett	1,269	60.0	+21.1
Liberal Democrats	Lynn Drake*	416	19.7	−26.8
BNP	David Spencer	282	13.3	N/A
Conservative	Christopher Davies	147	7.0	−7.7
Majority		853	40.4	
Turnout		2,159	22.8	−2.1
Labour gain from Liberal Democrats		Swing		

=== May 2011 ===
2011
Party	Candidate	Votes	%	±%
Labour	Gina Loveday*	1,400	58.5	+10.4
Liberal Democrats	Steve Middleton	368	15.4	−23.1
Conservative	George Darlington	198	8.3	−5.1
BNP	Keith Fairhurst	167	7.0	N/A
UKIP	Graeme Hulse	161	6.7	N/A
TUSC	Andy Behan	98	4.1	N/A
Majority		1,032		
Turnout		2,415	26.1	
Labour hold		Swing		

=== May 2010 ===
2010
Party	Candidate	Votes	%	±%
Labour	John Warmisham*	1,888	43.6	+4.7
Liberal Democrats	Steve Middleton	1,211	28.0	−18.5
Conservative	George Darlington	572	13.2	−1.4
BNP	Edward O'Sullivan	505	11.7	+11.7
Independent	Jacquie O'Toole	123	2.8	+2.8
Majority		677	15.6	+8.0
Turnout		4,329	47.2	+22.3
Labour hold		Swing		

== Elections in 2000s ==
2008
Party	Candidate	Votes	%	±%
Liberal Democrats	Lynn Drake	1,049	46.5	+8.0
Labour	Andy, Salmon	878	38.9	−9.2
Conservative	Helen Vernon	330	14.6	+1.3
Majority		171	7.6	
Turnout			24.9	
Liberal Democrats gain from Labour		Swing		

2007
Party	Candidate	Votes	%	±%
Labour	Gina Loveday*	1,038	48.1	
Liberal Democrats	Lynn Drake	830	38.5	
Conservative	Helen Vernon	288	13.4	
Majority		208	9.6	
Turnout		2,156	24.5	
Labour hold		Swing		

2006
Party	Candidate	Votes	%	±%
Labour	John Warmisham	890	46.8	
Liberal Democrats	Lynn Drake	758	39.9	
Conservative	Sydney Cooper	253	13.3	
Majority		132	6.9	
Turnout		1,901	23.5	−7.3
Labour hold		Swing		

2004
Party	Candidate	Votes	%	±%
Labour	Andrew Salmon	1,195		
Labour	Jane Hepworth	973		
Labour	John Warmisham	917		
Liberal Democrats	John Deas	639		
Liberal Democrats	Roy Laurence	599		
Liberal	Christopher Barnes	552		
Conservative	Anthony Healey	448		
Liberal	Robin Radnell	412		
Turnout		5,735	30.8	
Labour win (new seat)				
Labour win (new seat)				
Labour win (new seat)				
