= Irwell Riverside =

- Electoral ward
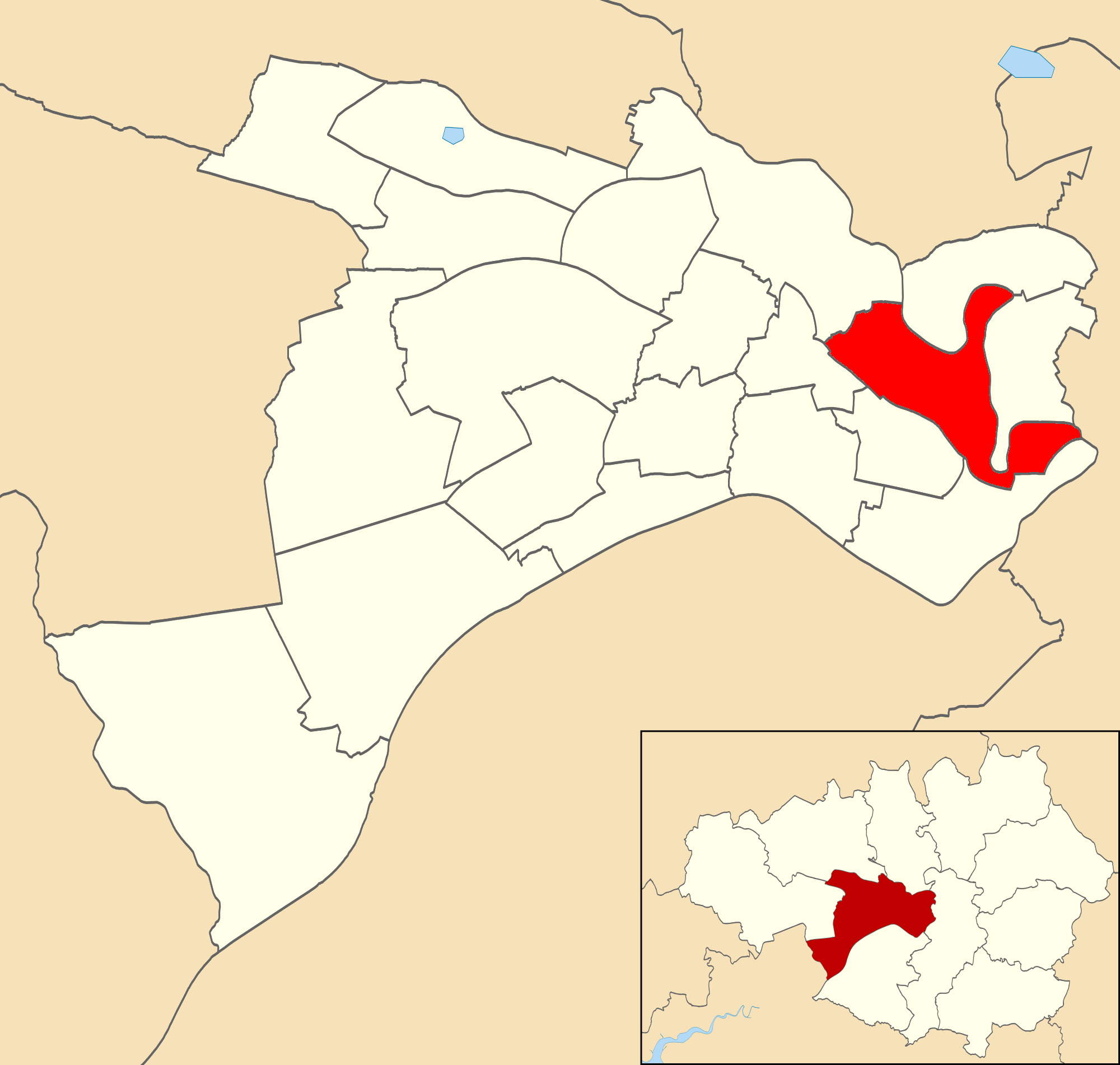
- Irwell Riverside ward within Salford City Council.

- Coat of arms
- Motto: Let the good (or safety) of the people be the supreme (or highest) law
- Interactive map of Irwell Riverside
- Coordinates: 53.4958°N 2.2800°W
- Country: United Kingdom
- Constituent country: England
- Region: North West England
- County: Greater Manchester
- Metropolitan borough: Salford
- Created: May 2004
- Abolished: May 2021
- Named after: River Irwell, Salford

Government UK Parliament constituency: Salford and Eccles
  - Type: Unicameral
  - Body: Salford City Council
  - Mayor of Salford: Paul Dennett (Labour)

Population
  - Total: 12,939
- Ward profile conducted by Salford City Council in 2014.

Irwell Riverside was an electoral ward of Salford, England from May 2004 until May 2021. The ward was bounded by meanders of the River Irwell and included the main University of Salford campus.

It was represented in Westminster by Rebecca Long-Bailey MP for Salford and Eccles. A profile of the ward conducted by Salford City Council in 2014 recorded a population of 12,939.

== Councillors ==
The ward was represented by three councillors:

Election	Councillor	Councillor	Councillor
2004	Ward created		
2004	James Hulmes (Lab)	Joseph Murphy (Lab)	Joseph Holt (Lab)
2006	James Hulmes (Lab)	Joseph Murphy (Lab)	Stephen Coen (Lab)
2007	James Hulmes (Lab)	Joseph Murphy (Lab)	Stephen Coen (Lab)
2008	James Hulmes (Lab)	Joseph Murphy (Lab)	Stephen Coen (Lab)
By-election; 21 May 2009	Matt Mold (Lab)	Joseph Murphy (Lab)	Stephen Coen (Lab)
2010	Matt Mold (Lab)	Joseph Murphy (Lab)	Stephen Coen (Lab)
2011	Matt Mold (Lab)	Stephen Ord (Lab)	Stephen Coen (Lab)
2012	Matt Mold (Lab)	Stephen Ord (Lab)	Stephen Coen (Lab)
2014	Jane Hamilton (Lab)	Stephen Ord (Lab)	Stephen Coen (Lab)
2015	Jane Hamilton (Lab)	Stephen Ord (Lab)	Stephen Coen (Lab)
2016	Jane Hamilton (Lab)	Stephen Ord (Lab)	Stephen Coen (Lab)
2018	Jane Hamilton (Lab)	Stephen Ord (Lab)	Stephen Coen (Lab)
2019	Jane Hamilton (Lab)	Ray Walker (Lab)	Stephen Coen (Lab)
2021	Ward abolished		

indicates seat up for re-election. indicates seat won in by-election.

== Elections in 2010s ==
=== May 2019 ===
2019
Party	Candidate	Votes	%	±%
Labour	Ray Walker*	829	48.62	
Green	Wendy Olsen	352	20.65	
UKIP	John L Froggatt	254	14.9	
Conservative	Michael Richman	132	7.74	
Liberal Democrats	Ionel Mereuta	123	7.21	
Majority		477	27.97	
Turnout		1,705	22.33	
Labour hold		Swing		

=== May 2018 ===
2018
Party	Candidate	Votes	%	±%
Labour	Jane Hamilton*	1,053	66.0	
Conservative	Max Dowling	189	11.8	
Green	Wendy Olsen	178	11.2	
UKIP	Jonathan Marsden	97	6.1	
Liberal Democrats	Valerie Smith	78	4.9	
Majority		864	54.2	
Turnout		1,601	19.98	
Labour hold		Swing		

=== May 2016 ===
2016
Party	Candidate	Votes	%	±%
Labour	Stephen Coen*	1,055	58.0	+3.2
UKIP	Katherine Alder	316	17.4	+1.5
Green	Wendy Kay Olsen	233	12.8	−1.0
Conservative	Thomas Richard Chambers	180	9.9	−2.3
TUSC	Benjamin Wilkes	35	1.9	−0.5
Majority		739	40.6	+1.7
Turnout		1,819	25.5	−13.4
Labour hold		Swing		

=== May 2015 ===
2015
Party	Candidate	Votes	%	±%
Labour	Stephen Stuart Ord*	2,124	54.8	+5.5
UKIP	Katherine Alder	617	15.9	−6.0
Green	Wendy Olsen	537	13.8	+2.8
Conservative	Jessica Taberner	472	12.2	+3.0
TUSC	Jamie Carr	92	2.4	−2.8
BNP	Carl Lawson	37	1.0	−2.4
Majority		1,507	38.9	
Turnout		3,879	53.4	
Labour hold		Swing		

=== May 2014 ===
2014
Party	Candidate	Votes	%	±%
Labour	Jane Elizabeth Hamilton	1,044	49.3	
UKIP	Janice Taylor	464	21.9	
Green	Emma Sarah Louise Van Dyke	233	11.0	
Conservative	Helen Vaudrey	194	9.2	
TUSC	Graham Cooper	110	5.2	
BNP	Gary Tumulty	73	3.4	
Majority		580	27.4	
Turnout		2,118		
Labour hold		Swing		

=== May 2012 ===
2012
Party	Candidate	Votes	%	±%
Labour	Stephen Coen*	1,208	70.3	+19.4
BNP	Gary Tumulty	202	11.8	−1.6
Liberal Democrats	Steve Middleton	158	9.2	−10.1
Conservative	David Lewis	150	8.7	−7.7
Majority		1,006	58.6	
Turnout		1,734	18.4	−2.2
Labour hold		Swing		

=== May 2011 ===
2011
Party	Candidate	Votes	%	±%
Labour	Stephen Ord	1,460	68.5	+12.1
Liberal Democrats	Janice Taylor	202	9.5	−11.9
BNP	Gary Tumulty	167	7.8	−3.6
UKIP	Alan Wright	92	4.3	N/A
Majority		1,251		
Turnout		2,158	23.1	
Labour hold		Swing		

=== May 2010 ===
2010
Party	Candidate	Votes	%	±%
Labour	Matt Mold*	1,790	44.9	−6.0
Liberal Democrats	Damien Shannon	1,070	26.9	+7.6
Conservative	Christine Yates	492	12.3	−4.1
BNP	Gary Tumulty	409	10.3	−3.1
Green	Rob Mitchell	195	4.9	+4.9
Majority		720	18.1	−13.5
Turnout		3,985	43.5	+22.9
Labour hold		Swing		

== Elections in 2000s ==
By-election 21 May 2009
Party	Candidate	Votes	%	±%
Labour	Matt Mold*	1,790	37.6	−13.3
Liberal Democrats	Steven Ian Middleton	293	18.2	−1.1
BNP	Gary Tumulty	276	17.1	+3.8
Conservative	Chris Bates	189	11.7	−4.7
Green	Rob Mitchell	125	7.8	+7.8
UKIP	Duran Benjamin O'Dwyer	123	7.6	+7.6
Majority		1,497	19.4	
Turnout		1,612	17.6	
Labour hold		Swing		

2008
Party	Candidate	Votes	%	±%
Labour	Stephen Coen	888	50.9	−5.5
Liberal Democrats	Kenneth Mckelvey	337	19.3	−2.1
Conservative	David Lewis	286	16.4	+5.6
BNP	Anthony Healey	233	13.4	+2.0
Majority		551	31.6	
Turnout			20.6	
Labour hold		Swing		

2007
Party	Candidate	Votes	%	±%
Labour	Joseph Murphy*	1,051	56.4	
Liberal Democrats	Kenneth McKelvey	399	21.4	
BNP	Anthony Healey	212	11.4	
Conservative	Nicolette Turner	202	10.8	
Majority		652		
Turnout		1,864	21.2	
Labour hold		Swing		

2006
Party	Candidate	Votes	%	±%
Labour	James Hulmes	716		
Labour	Stephen Coen	675		
Liberal Democrats	Kenneth McKelvey	611		
Conservative	Edith Moores	284		
Conservative	Jack Stockford	173		
Turnout		2,459	20.4	−7.6
Labour hold		Swing		

2004
Party	Candidate	Votes	%	±%
Labour	Joseph Holt	925		
Labour	Joseph Murphy	868		
Labour	James Hulmes	819		
Liberal Democrats	Christine Corry	616		
Liberal Democrats	Lynn Drake	573		
Liberal Democrats	James Eisen	536		
Conservative	Edith Moores	324		
BNP	Anthony Wentworth	304		
Turnout		4,965	28.0	
Labour win (new seat)				
Labour win (new seat)				
Labour win (new seat)				
