= 2004 Salford City Council election =

2004 UK local government election

Results of the 2004 Salford City Council election

The 2004 Salford City Council election took place on 10 June 2004 to elect members of Salford City Council in England. The whole council was up for election with boundary changes having taken place since the last election in 2003. The Labour Party kept overall control of the council. Overall turnout was 35.53%.

== Election result ==
Salford local election result 2004
Party	Seats	Gains	Losses	Net gain/loss	Seats %	Votes %	Votes	+/−
Labour	44			-7	73.3	48.2	59,925	-4.6%
Liberal Democrats	8			+3	13.3	27.4	34,068	+6.4%
Conservative	8			+5	13.3	23.0	28,654	-0.4%
Liberal	0			0	0	0.8	964	+0.8%
Independent	0			-1	0	0.4	463	-2.0%
BNP	0			0	0	0.2	304	+0.2%

== Ward results ==
=== Barton ===
Barton (3)
Party	Candidate	Votes	%	±%
Labour	John Mullen	1,238		
Labour	Neville Clark	1,135		
Labour	David Jolley	984		
Liberal Democrats	Alan Patten	855		
Conservative	Renee Holt	725		
Conservative	Alan Nicholls	692		
Turnout		5,629	32.5	
Labour win (new seat)				
Labour win (new seat)				
Labour win (new seat)				

=== Boothstown and Ellenbrook ===
Boothstown and Ellenbrook (3)
Party	Candidate	Votes	%	±%
Conservative	Beryl Howard	1,458		
Conservative	Robin Garrido	1,363		
Conservative	Christine Gray	1,309		
Liberal Democrats	Michael Dunn	986		
Liberal Democrats	Gary Riding	912		
Liberal Democrats	Joan Higgin	691		
Labour	Neville Gregory	526		
Labour	Michael Felse	474		
Labour	Andrew Nicol	464		
Turnout		8,183	40.9	
Conservative win (new seat)				
Conservative win (new seat)				
Conservative win (new seat)				

=== Broughton ===
Broughton (3)
Party	Candidate	Votes	%	±%
Labour	James King	1,263		
Labour	Bernard Murphy	1,241		
Labour	John Merry	1,133		
Liberal Democrats	Susan Carson	744		
Liberal Democrats	Ronald Benjamin	615		
Liberal Democrats	Thomas Ferrnley	577		
Turnout		5,573	28.1	
Labour win (new seat)				
Labour win (new seat)				
Labour win (new seat)				

=== Cadishead ===
Cadishead (3)
Party	Candidate	Votes	%	±%
Labour	James Hunt	1,140		
Labour	Christine Hudson	1,119		
Labour	Keith Mann	949		
Conservative	Leslie Taylor	780		
Conservative	Elizabeth Hill	766		
Liberal Democrats	Mariska Jones	559		
Turnout		5,313	36.3	
Labour win (new seat)				
Labour win (new seat)				
Labour win (new seat)				

=== Claremont ===
Claremont (3)
Party	Candidate	Votes	%	±%
Liberal Democrats	Norman Owen	1,505		
Liberal Democrats	Stephen Cooke	1,166		
Liberal Democrats	Timothy Perkins	1,074		
Labour	Louise Baxter	964		
Labour	Peter Wheeler	848		
Labour	James Short	830		
Conservative	Sydney Cooper	764		
Turnout		7,151	39.4	
Liberal Democrats win (new seat)				
Liberal Democrats win (new seat)				
Liberal Democrats win (new seat)				

=== Eccles ===
Eccles (3)
Party	Candidate	Votes	%	±%
Labour	Alan Broughton	1,247		
Labour	Edmund Sheehy	1,167		
Liberal Democrats	Peter Hayes	1,019		
Labour	Jane Murphy	928		
Conservative	Michael Edwards	919		
Liberal Democrats	Christine Lomax	814		
Conservative	Christine Upton	785		
Turnout		6,879	39.1	
Labour win (new seat)				
Labour win (new seat)				
Liberal Democrats win (new seat)				

=== Irlam ===
Irlam (3)
Party	Candidate	Votes	%	±%
Labour	John Jones	1,073		
Labour	Joseph Kean	922		
Labour	Roger Lightup	842		
Conservative	Joyce Collins	679		
Liberal Democrats	Christine Race	606		
Turnout		4,122	32.1	
Labour win (new seat)				
Labour win (new seat)				
Labour win (new seat)				

=== Irwell Riverside ===
Irwell Riverside (3)
Party	Candidate	Votes	%	±%
Labour	Joseph Holt	925		
Labour	Joseph Murphy	868		
Labour	James Hulmes	819		
Liberal Democrats	Christine Corry	616		
Liberal Democrats	Lynn Drake	573		
Liberal Democrats	James Eisen	536		
Conservative	Edith Moores	324		
BNP	Anthony Wentworth	304		
Turnout		4,965	28.0	
Labour win (new seat)				
Labour win (new seat)				
Labour win (new seat)				

=== Kersal ===
Kersal (3)
Party	Candidate	Votes	%	±%
Labour	Peter Connor	1,615		
Labour	George Wilson	1,196		
Labour	Ann-Marie Humphreys	1,128		
Liberal Democrats	Eric Sievers	1,105		
Liberal Democrats	Harold Kershner	1,101		
Conservative	Jeremiah Horgan	791		
Liberal Democrats	Bernard Carson	612		
Turnout		7,548	40.9	
Labour win (new seat)				
Labour win (new seat)				
Labour win (new seat)				

=== Langworthy ===
Langworthy (3)
Party	Candidate	Votes	%	±%
Labour	Andrew Salmon	1,195		
Labour	Jane Hepworth	973		
Labour	John Warmisham	917		
Liberal Democrats	John Deas	639		
Liberal Democrats	Roy Laurence	599		
Liberal	Christopher Barnes	552		
Conservative	Anthony Healey	448		
Liberal	Robin Radnell	412		
Turnout		5,735	30.8	
Labour win (new seat)				
Labour win (new seat)				
Labour win (new seat)				

=== Little Hulton ===
Little Hulton (3)
Party	Candidate	Votes	%	±%
Labour	Doris Fernandez	1,300		
Labour	Alice Smyth	1,256		
Labour	Eric Burgoyne	1,234		
Liberal Democrats	David Cowpe	523		
Conservative	William MacDonald	493		
Liberal Democrats	Pauline Ogden	484		
Conservative	David Owen	455		
Conservative	Elaine West	425		
Turnout		6,170	30.8	
Labour win (new seat)				
Labour win (new seat)				
Labour win (new seat)				

=== Ordsall ===
Ordsall (3)
Party	Candidate	Votes	%	±%
Labour	Susan Slater	665		
Labour	Peter Dobbs	639		
Labour	Alan Clague	541		
Liberal Democrats	Philip Bowers	530		
Conservative	Jonathan Thomason	288		
Independent	Alan Valentine	241		
Turnout		2,904	28.2	
Labour win (new seat)				
Labour win (new seat)				
Labour win (new seat)				

=== Pendlebury ===
Pendlebury (3)
Party	Candidate	Votes	%	±%
Labour	Barry Warner	1,207		
Labour	Patricia Lea	1,096		
Labour	Bernard Lea	1,000		
Liberal Democrats	Margaret Ferrer	872		
Conservative	John Booth	707		
Conservative	Bridie Madden	674		
Turnout		5,556	35.1	
Labour win (new seat)				
Labour win (new seat)				
Labour win (new seat)				

=== Swinton North ===
Swinton North (3)
Party	Candidate	Votes	%	±%
Labour	Derek Antrobus	1,326		
Labour	James Dawson	1,286		
Labour	Charles William Hinds	1,147		
Liberal Democrats	Valerie Gregory	1,039		
Conservative	Patricia Mills	798		
Turnout		5,596	35.3	
Labour win (new seat)				
Labour win (new seat)				
Labour win (new seat)				

=== Swinton South ===
Swinton South (3)
Party	Candidate	Votes	%	±%
Labour	Douglas Daniels	1,158		
Labour	John Cullen	1,102		
Labour	Charles McIntyre	1,016		
Liberal Democrats	Karl Henshall	1,006		
Liberal Democrats	Joseph O'Neill	992		
Conservative	Catherine Edwards	954		
Conservative	George Woods	597		
Turnout		6,825	36.5	
Labour win (new seat)				
Labour win (new seat)				
Labour win (new seat)				

=== Walkden North ===
Walkden North (3)
Party	Candidate	Votes	%	±%
Labour	Vincent Devine	1,349		
Labour	William Pennington	1,288		
Labour	Barbara Miller	1,162		
Conservative	Walter Edwards	617		
Liberal Democrats	Daryll Toone	599		
Conservative	Eileen MacDonald	566		
Conservative	Graham Bedingham	508		
Turnout		6,089	34.2	
Labour win (new seat)				
Labour win (new seat)				
Labour win (new seat)				

=== Walkden South ===
Walkden South (3)
Party	Candidate	Votes	%	±%
Labour	Stanley Witkowski	1,031		
Conservative	Iain Lindley	1,010		
Conservative	David Lewis	1,008		
Conservative	Glenis Purcell	978		
Labour	Valerie Burgoyne	928		
Liberal Democrats	Deborah Rushton	921		
Labour	Norbert Potter	858		
Liberal Democrats	John Grant	855		
Liberal Democrats	Peter Brown	825		
Independent	David Bowers	222		
Turnout		8,636	40.7	
Labour win (new seat)				
Conservative win (new seat)				
Conservative win (new seat)				

=== Weaste & Seedley ===
Weaste and Seedley (3)
Party	Candidate	Votes	%	±%
Liberal Democrats	Janice Heywood	1,298		
Liberal Democrats	Geoffrey Ainsworth	1,264		
Liberal Democrats	Rick Powell	1,158		
Labour	James Harold	916		
Labour	Bernadette Wright	907		
Labour	Stephen Coen	796		
Conservative	Nicholas Wakefield	538		
Turnout		6,877	37.4	
Liberal Democrats win (new seat)				
Liberal Democrats win (new seat)				
Liberal Democrats win (new seat)				

=== Winton ===
Winton (3)
Party	Candidate	Votes	%	±%
Labour	David Lancaster	1,194		
Liberal Democrats	John Pooley	1,029		
Labour	Margaret Morris	1,014		
Labour	Michelle Wilkinson	981		
Conservative	Gary Green	754		
Conservative	Judith Tope	728		
Turnout		5,700	34.0	
Labour win (new seat)				
Liberal Democrats win (new seat)				
Labour win (new seat)				

=== Worsley ===
Worsley (3)
Party	Candidate	Votes	%	±%
Conservative	Karen Garrido	1,725		
Conservative	James McDonald	1,567		
Conservative	Graham Compton	1,461		
Liberal Democrats	Robert Boyd	1,230		
Liberal Democrats	Sara Bradbury	837		
Liberal Democrats	Paul Gregory	700		
Labour	Alan Brocklehurst	485		
Labour	Warren Coates	483		
Labour	Philip Cusack	437		
Turnout		8,925	50.4	
Conservative win (new seat)				
Conservative win (new seat)				
Conservative win (new seat)				
