= Ordsall (ward) =

- Electoral ward
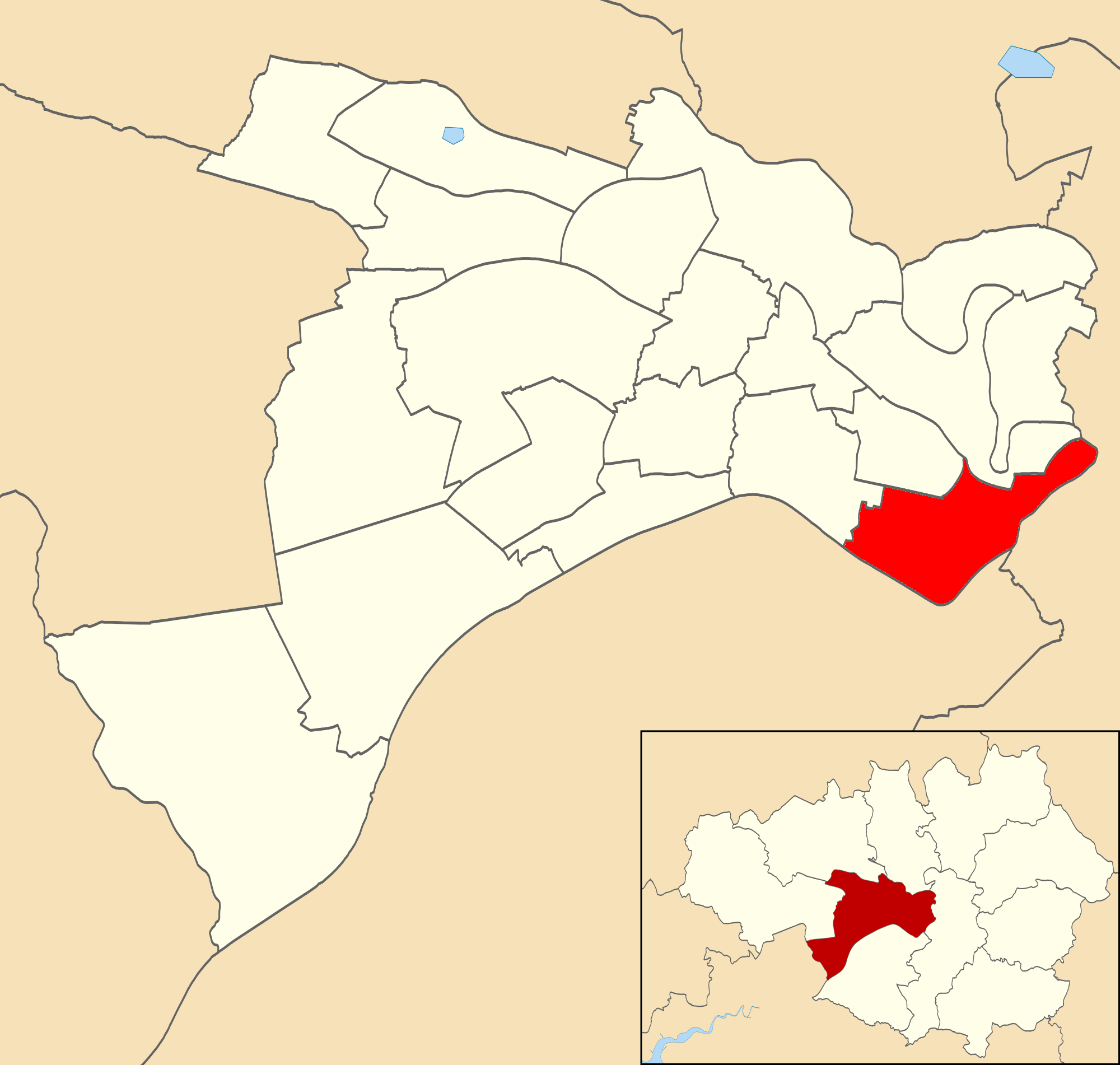
- Ordsall ward within Salford City Council.

- Coat of arms
- Motto: Let the good (or safety) of the people be the supreme (or highest) law
- Interactive map of Ordsall
- Coordinates: 53.4760°N 2.2779°W
- Country: United Kingdom
- Constituent country: England
- Region: North West England
- County: Greater Manchester
- Metropolitan borough: Salford
- Created: May 2004
- Named for: Ordsall

Government UK Parliament constituency: Salford and Eccles
  - Type: Unicameral
  - Body: Salford City Council
  - Mayor of Salford: Paul Dennett (Labour)
  - Councillor: Tanya Burch (Labour)
  - Councillor: Peter Dobbs (Labour)
  - Councillor: Ray Mashiter (Labour)

Population
  - Total: 16,725
- Ward profile conducted by Salford City Council in 2014.

Ordsall is an electoral ward of Salford, England. The ward includes Ordsall itself, the Salford Quays redevelopment area and the easternmost part of Salford which adjoins Manchester city centre.

It is represented in Westminster by Rebecca Long-Bailey MP for Salford and Eccles. A profile of the ward conducted by Salford City Council in 2014 recorded a population of 16,725.

== Councillors ==
The ward is represented by three councillors: Tanya Burch (Lab), Peter Dobbs (Lab), and Ray Mashiter (Lab).

Election	Councillor	Councillor	Councillor
2004	Alan Clague (Lab)	Peter Dobbs (Lab)	Susan Slater (Lab)
2006	Alan Clague (Lab)	Peter Dobbs (Lab)	Susan Slater (Lab)
2007	Alan Clague (Lab)	Ian MacDonald (Lab)	Susan Slater (Lab)
2008	Alan Clague (Lab)	Ian MacDonald (Lab)	Ray Mashiter (Lab)
2010	Alan Clague (Lab)	Ian MacDonald (Lab)	Ray Mashiter (Lab)
2011	Alan Clague (Lab)	Peter Dobbs (Lab)	Ray Mashiter (Lab)
2012	Alan Clague (Lab)	Peter Dobbs (Lab)	Ray Mashiter (Lab)
2014	Tanya Burch (Lab)	Peter Dobbs (Lab)	Ray Mashiter (Lab)
2015	Tanya Burch (Lab)	Peter Dobbs (Lab)	Ray Mashiter (Lab)
2016	Tanya Burch (Lab)	Peter Dobbs (Lab)	Ray Mashiter (Lab)
2018	Tanya Burch (Lab)	Peter Dobbs (Lab)	Ray Mashiter (Lab)

indicates seat up for re-election.

== Elections in 2010s ==
=== May 2018 ===
2018
Party	Candidate	Votes	%	±%
Labour	Tanya Burch*	1,583	65.2	
Conservative	Joshua Nelson	367	15.1	
Green	Emma Van Dyke	263	10.8	
Liberal Democrats	John Grant	215	8.9	
Majority		1,216	50.1	
Turnout		2,448	19.26	
Labour hold		Swing		

=== May 2016 ===
2016
Party	Candidate	Votes	%	±%
Labour	Ray Mashiter*	1,521	58.9	+6.0
Conservative	Adam Robert Carney	370	14.3	−6.7
Green	Emma Sarah Louise Van Dyke	331	12.8	−1.3
UKIP	Owen Martin Hammond	280	10.8	−0.6
TUSC	Ashley Jade Taylor	48	1.9	−0.6
Majority		1,151	44.6	+15.0
Turnout		2,583	24.6	−28.3
Labour hold		Swing		

=== May 2015 ===
2015
Party	Candidate	Votes	%	±%
Labour	Peter William Dobbs*	2,950	50.6	−4.8
Conservative	Jonathan Boot	1,224	21.0	+3.7
Green	Jim Alayo-Arnabat	825	14.1	−5.5
UKIP	Christopher Barnes	665	11.4	N/A
TUSC	Stephanie Vickers	146	2.5	−5.3
Majority		1,726	29.6	−6.3
Turnout		5,832	52.9	
Labour hold		Swing		

=== May 2014 ===
2014
Party	Candidate	Votes	%	±%
Labour	Tanya Burch	1,468	55.4	
Green	Jim Alayo-Arnabat	518	19.6	
Conservative	Nicolette Turner	457	17.3	
TUSC	Sally Griffiths	206	7.8	
Majority		950	35.9	
Turnout		2,649		
Labour hold		Swing		

=== May 2012 ===
2012
Party	Candidate	Votes	%	±%
Labour	Ray Mashiter*	1,079	60.3	+5.4
TUSC	George Tapp	335	18.7	N/A
Conservative	Dave Morgan	225	12.6	−10.3
Liberal Democrats	Kate Middleton	151	8.4	−13.8
Majority		744	41.6	
Turnout		1,812	17.9	−5.5
Labour hold		Swing		

=== May 2011 ===
2011
Party	Candidate	Votes	%	±%
Labour	Peter Dobbs*	1,236	52.9	−2.3
TUSC	George Tapp	381	16.3	N/A
Conservative	Marvin Herron	339	14.5	−2.1
Liberal Democrats	Kate Middleton	280	12.0	−7.4
UKIP	Michael Beesley	102	4.4	−4.4
Majority		855		
Turnout		2,367	26.1	
Labour hold		Swing		

=== May 2010 ===
2010
Party	Candidate	Votes	%	±%
Labour	Alan Clague*	1,609	41.7	−13.2
Liberal Democrats	Marion Croucher	1,198	31.0	+8.8
Conservative	Chris Clarkson	773	20.0	−2.9
TUSC	Andrew Behan	255	6.6	+6.6
Majority		411	10.6	−21.4
Turnout		3,863	50.2	+26.8
Labour hold		Swing		

== Elections in 2000s ==
2008
Party	Candidate	Votes	%	±%
Labour	Ray Mashiter	860	54.9	−0.3
Conservative	Yan Cockayne	358	22.9	+6.3
Liberal Democrats	Liam Starkey	348	22.2	+2.8
Majority		502	32.0	
Turnout			23.4	
Labour hold		Swing		

2007
Party	Candidate	Votes	%	±%
Labour	Peter Dobbs*	688	55.2	
Liberal Democrats	Stephen Plaister	242	19.4	
Conservative	Yan Cockayne	207	16.6	
UKIP	Duran O'Dwyer	110	8.8	
Majority		446		
Turnout		1,247	20.1	
Labour hold		Swing		

2006
Party	Candidate	Votes	%	±%
Labour	Alan Clague	584	52.4	
Liberal Democrats	Stephen Plaister	287	25.8	
Conservative	Nicholas Grant	243	21.8	
Majority		297	26.6	
Turnout		1,114	21.1	−7.1
Labour hold		Swing		

2004
Party	Candidate	Votes	%	±%
Labour	Susan Slater	665		
Labour	Peter Dobbs	639		
Labour	Alan Clague	541		
Liberal Democrats	Philip Bowers	530		
Conservative	Jonathan Thomason	288		
Independent	Alan Valentine	241		
Turnout		2,904	28.2	
Labour win (new seat)				
Labour win (new seat)				
Labour win (new seat)				
