= 2006 Salford City Council election =

2006 UK local government election

Results of the 2006 Salford City Council election

The 2006 Salford City Council election took place on 4 May 2006 to elect members of Salford City Council in England. One third of the council was up for election and the Labour party kept overall control of the council. Overall turnout was 28.1%.

After the election, the composition of the council was:

Party	Seats	±
Labour	44	0
Conservative	8	0
Liberal Democrat	8	0

== Election result ==
Salford local election result 2006
Party	Seats	Gains	Losses	Net gain/loss	Seats %	Votes %	Votes	+/−
Labour	16	0	1	-1	66.7	42.7	19,634	-5.5%
Conservative	3	0	0	0	12.5	29.6	13,632	+6.6%
Liberal Democrats	3	2	0	+2	12.5	25.8	11,854	-1.6%
BNP	0	0	0	0	0	0.9	424	+0.7%
Independent	0	0	1	-1	0	0.5	244	+0.1%
Green	0	0	0	0	0	0.5	224	+0.5%

== Ward results ==
=== Barton ===
Barton
Party	Candidate	Votes	%	±%
Labour	David Jolley*	971	45.3	
Liberal Democrats	Roy Laurence	511	23.9	
Conservative	Gary Green	416	19.4	
Independent	Alan Valentine	244	11.4	
Majority		460	21.4	
Turnout		2,142	25.1	−7.4
Labour hold		Swing		

=== Boothstown and Ellenbrook ===
Boothstown and Ellenbrook
Party	Candidate	Votes	%	±%
Conservative	Christine Gray*	1,354	54.3	
Labour	Philip Cusack	615	24.7	
Liberal Democrats	Ronald Benjamin	300	12.0	
Green	Roy Battersby	224	9.0	
Majority		739	29.6	
Turnout		2,493	33.3	−7.6
Conservative hold		Swing		

=== Broughton ===
Broughton
Party	Candidate	Votes	%	±%
Labour	John Merry*	1,077	56.3	
Liberal Democrats	Susan Carson	557	29.1	
Conservative	Hilary Brunyee	278	14.5	
Majority		520	27.2	
Turnout		1,912	26.4	−1.7
Labour hold		Swing		

=== Cadishead ===
Cadishead
Party	Candidate	Votes	%	±%
Labour	Keith Mann*	1,118	53.2	
Conservative	Elizabeth Hill	982	46.8	
Majority		136	6.4	
Turnout		2,100	30.1	−6.2
Labour hold		Swing		

=== Claremont ===
Claremont
Party	Candidate	Votes	%	±%
Liberal Democrats	Margaret Ferrer	1,162	44.3	
Labour	Peter Wheeler	707	26.9	
BNP	Edward O'Sullivan	424	16.2	
Conservative	Catherine Edwards	331	12.6	
Majority		455	17.4	
Turnout		2,624	33.2	−6.2
Liberal Democrats gain from Independent		Swing		

=== Eccles ===
Eccles
Party	Candidate	Votes	%	±%
Labour	Jane Murphy	1,038	39.2	
Conservative	Ann Davies	975	36.9	
Liberal Democrats	Christine Lomax	632	23.9	
Majority		63	2.3	
Turnout		2,645	33.6	−5.5
Labour hold		Swing		

=== Irlam ===
Irlam
Party	Candidate	Votes	%	±%
Labour	Roger Lightup*	905	49.6	
Conservative	Joyce Collins	585	32.1	
Liberal Democrats	Mariska Jones	334	18.3	
Majority		320	17.5	
Turnout		1,824	25.9	−6.2
Labour hold		Swing		

=== Irlam Riverside ===
Irwell Riverside (2)
Party	Candidate	Votes	%	±%
Labour	James Hulmes*	716		
Labour	Stephen Coen	675		
Liberal Democrats	Kenneth McKelvey	611		
Conservative	Edith Moores	284		
Conservative	Jack Stockford	173		
Turnout		2,459	20.4	−7.6
Labour hold		Swing		
Labour hold		Swing		

=== Kersal ===
Kersal
Party	Candidate	Votes	%	±%
Labour	Ann-Marie Humphreys*	1,077	47.2	
Liberal Democrats	Harold Hershner	642	28.1	
Conservative	Colin Moore	563	24.7	
Majority		435	19.1	
Turnout		2,282	29.9	−11.0
Labour hold		Swing		

=== Langworthy ===
Langworthy
Party	Candidate	Votes	%	±%
Labour	John Warmisham*	890	46.8	
Liberal Democrats	Lynn Drake	758	39.9	
Conservative	Sydney Cooper	253	13.3	
Majority		132	6.9	
Turnout		1,901	23.5	−7.3
Labour hold		Swing		

=== Little Hulton ===
Little Hulton (2)
Party	Candidate	Votes	%	±%
Labour	Eric Burgoyne*	890		
Labour	Patricia Ryan	862		
Liberal Democrats	David Cowpe	375		
Conservative	Nicolette Turner	341		
Liberal Democrats	Thomas Fernley	296		
Conservative	Elaine West	274		
Turnout		3,038	19.8	−11.0
Labour hold		Swing		
Labour hold		Swing		

=== Ordsall ===
Ordsall
Party	Candidate	Votes	%	±%
Labour	Alan Clague*	584	52.4	
Liberal Democrats	Stephen Plaister	287	25.8	
Conservative	Nicholas Grant	243	21.8	
Majority		297	26.6	
Turnout		1,114	21.1	−7.1
Labour hold		Swing		

=== Pendlebury ===
Pendlebury
Party	Candidate	Votes	%	±%
Labour	Bernard Lea*	1,143	49.1	
Conservative	Peter Allcock	643	27.6	
Liberal Democrats	Christine Corry	543	23.3	
Majority		500	21.5	
Turnout		2,329	27.4	−7.7
Labour hold		Swing		

=== Swinton North ===
Swinton North
Party	Candidate	Votes	%	±%
Labour	Charles Hinds*	1,107	46.8	
Conservative	Michael Edward	662	28.0	
Liberal Democrats	Paul Gregory	596	25.2	
Majority		455	18.8	
Turnout		2,365	28.6	−6.7
Labour hold		Swing		

=== Swinton South ===
Swinton South
Party	Candidate	Votes	%	±%
Liberal Democrats	Joseph O'Neill	965	40.4	
Labour	Charles McIntyre*	842	35.2	
Conservative	Christine Allcock	584	24.4	
Majority		123	5.2	
Turnout		2,391	29.1	−7.4
Liberal Democrats gain from Labour		Swing		

=== Walkden North ===
Walkden North
Party	Candidate	Votes	%	±%
Labour	Barbara Miller*	1,062	55.2	
Conservative	Walter Edwards	542	28.2	
Liberal Democrats	Margita Shevchikova	319	16.6	
Majority		520	27.0	
Turnout		1,923	24.0	−10.2
Labour hold		Swing		

=== Walkden South ===
Walkden South
Party	Candidate	Votes	%	±%
Conservative	Leslie Turner	1,385	47.5	
Labour	Adrian Brocklehurst	900	30.9	
Liberal Democrats	Pauline Ogden	632	21.7	
Majority		485	16.6	
Turnout		2,917	38.9	−1.8
Conservative hold		Swing		

=== Weaste & Seedley ===
Weaste and Seedley
Party	Candidate	Votes	%	±%
Liberal Democrats	John Deas	1,003	44.9	
Labour	Stephen Race	888	39.7	
Conservative	Jonathan Thomason	345	15.4	
Majority		115	5.2	
Turnout		2,236	28.9	−8.5
Liberal Democrats hold		Swing		

=== Winton ===
Winton
Party	Candidate	Votes	%	±%
Labour	Margaret Morris*	994	47.0	
Liberal Democrats	Philip Ward	682	32.2	
Conservative	Judith Tope	439	20.8	
Majority		555	14.8	
Turnout		2,115	25.0	−9.0
Labour hold		Swing		

=== Worsley ===
Worsley
Party	Candidate	Votes	%	±%
Conservative	Graham Compton*	1,980	61.8	
Liberal Democrats	James Gregory	649	20.3	
Labour	Warren Coates	573	17.9	
Majority		1,331	41.5	
Turnout		3,202	37.8	−12.6
Conservative hold		Swing		
