= 2018 Salford City Council election =

2018 local election in England

Map showing the results of the 2018 Salford City Council election

The 2018 Salford City Council election took place on 3 May 2018 to elect members of Salford City Council in England.

This result had the following consequences for the total number of seats on the council after the elections:

Party	Previous council	New council
Labour	49	50
Conservative	9	9
Independent	2	1
Total	60	60
Working majority	38	40

== Ward results ==
Asterisk denotes the sitting councillor.

=== Barton ===
Barton
Party	Candidate	Votes	%	±%
Labour	David Jolley*	1,348	64.2	
Conservative	Eileen MacDonald	396	18.8	
UKIP	Janice Snelgrove	170	8.1	
Green	Jennifer Mellish	111	5.3	
Liberal Democrats	Rhona Brown	76	3.6	
Majority		952	45.3	
Turnout		2,110	22.85	
Labour hold		Swing		

=== Boothstown and Ellenbrook ===
Boothstown and Ellenbrook
Party	Candidate	Votes	%	±%
Conservative	Jillian Collinson*	1,456	56.4	
Labour	Phil Cusack	906	35.1	
Liberal Democrats	Ian McKinlay	87	3.4	
Green	Morvern Rennie	75	2.9	
UKIP	Arthur Snelgrove	57	2.2	
Majority		551	21.3	
Turnout		2,586	34.08	
Conservative hold		Swing		

=== Broughton ===
Broughton
Party	Candidate	Votes	%	±%
Labour	John Merry*	1,492	67.0	
Conservative	Gilliam MacKenzie	369	16.6	
Green	David Jones	141	6.3	
UKIP	Nicola Williamson	135	6.1	
Liberal Democrats	Paul Dean	90	4.0	
Majority		1,123	50.4	
Turnout		2,237	22.19	
Labour hold		Swing		

=== Cadishead ===
Cadishead
Party	Candidate	Votes	%	±%
Labour	Joan Walsh	959	41.1	
Independent	Marcus Graham	752	32.3	
Conservative	Catherine Bisbey	461	19.8	
Green	Diane Cawood	128	5.5	
Liberal Democrats	Benjamin Web	31	1.3	
Majority		207	8.9	
Turnout		2,332	28.71	
Labour hold		Swing		

=== Claremont ===
Claremont
Party	Candidate	Votes	%	±%
Labour	Neil Reynolds*	1,167	49.2	
Conservative	Charlotte Woods	473	19.9	
Liberal Democrats	Stef Lorenz	406	17.1	
Independent	Mary Ferrer	200	8.4	
Green	Daniel Towers	117	4.9	
Majority		694	29.4	
Turnout		2,372	28.7	
Labour hold		Swing		

=== Eccles ===
Eccles
Party	Candidate	Votes	%	±%
Labour	Michael Wheeler*	1,748	60.3	
Conservative	David Hotchkin	638	22.0	
Green	Helen Alker	185	6.4	
Liberal Democrats	Guy Otten	169	5.8	
UKIP	Keith Hallam	134	4.6	
TUSC	Matt Kilsby	23	0.8	
Majority		1,110	38.3	
Turnout		2,902	31.33	
Labour hold		Swing		

=== Irlam ===
Irlam
Party	Candidate	Votes	%	±%
Labour Co-op	Roger Jones*	936	44.4	
Independent	Darren Goulden	769	36.4	
Conservative	James Mount	357	16.9	
Liberal Democrats	James Blessing	48	2.3	
Majority		167	7.9	
Turnout		2,116	30.28	
Labour Co-op hold		Swing		

=== Irwell Riverside ===
Irwell Riverside
Party	Candidate	Votes	%	±%
Labour	Jane Hamilton*	1,053	66.0	
Conservative	Max Dowling	189	11.8	
Green	Wendy Olsen	178	11.2	
UKIP	Jonathan Marsden	97	6.1	
Liberal Democrats	Valerie Smith	78	4.9	
Majority		864	54.2	
Turnout		1,601	19.98	
Labour hold		Swing		

=== Kersal ===
Kersal
Party	Candidate	Votes	%	±%
Conservative	Ari Leitner	1,660	59.0	
Labour	Anne-Marie Humphreys*	910	32.4	
Green	Stuart Oxbrow	94	3.3	
Liberal Democrats	Lucas Kane Webber	78	2.8	
UKIP	John Roberts	70	2.5	
Majority		750	26.7	
Turnout		2,821	35.21	
Conservative gain from Labour		Swing		

=== Langworthy ===
Langworthy
Party	Candidate	Votes	%	±%
Labour	John Warmisham*	1,055	60.8	
Conservative	Craig Thompson	202	11.6	
Liberal Democrats	Jake Overend	183	10.6	
UKIP	Stacey Olsen	147	8.5	
Green	Ian Pattinson	147	8.5	
Majority		853	49.2	
Turnout		1,741	19.54	
Labour hold		Swing		

=== Little Hulton ===
Little Hulton
Party	Candidate	Votes	%	±%
Labour	Collette Weir*	1,186	67.4	
Conservative	Nathan James	461	26.2	
Liberal Democrats	Lee Westley	113	6.4	
Majority		725	41.2	
Turnout		1,771	19.88	
Labour hold		Swing		

=== Ordsall ===
Ordsall
Party	Candidate	Votes	%	±%
Labour	Tanya Burch*	1,583	65.2	
Conservative	Joshua Nelson	367	15.1	
Green	Emma Van Dyke	263	10.8	
Liberal Democrats	John Grant	215	8.9	
Majority		1,216	50.1	
Turnout		2,448	19.26	
Labour hold		Swing		

=== Pendlebury ===
Pendlebury
Party	Candidate	Votes	%	±%
Labour	Sophia Linden	1,262	58.2	
Conservative	Dorothy Chapman	531	24.5	
Liberal Democrats	Beth Waller	151	7.0	
UKIP	Seamus Martin	147	6.8	
Green	Alastair Dewberry	79	3.6	
Majority		731	33.7	
Turnout		2,175	24.05	
Labour hold		Swing		

=== Swinton North ===
Swinton North
Party	Candidate	Votes	%	±%
Labour	Bill Hinds*	1,385	60.5	
Conservative	Andy Cheetham	513	22.4	
UKIP	Andy Olsen	168	7.3	
Green	Liam Waite	131	5.7	
Liberal Democrats	Adam Slack	91	4.0	
Majority		872	38.1	
Turnout		2,292	27.34	
Labour hold		Swing		

=== Swinton South ===
Swinton South
Party	Candidate	Votes	%	±%
Labour	Stuart Dickman	1,185	53.6	
Conservative	Adam Carney	491	22.2	
English Democrat	Craig Holmes	163	7.4	
Green	Nicola Smith	137	6.2	
SDP	Joe O’Neill	130	5.9	
Liberal Democrats	Jade O’Neil	103	4.7	
Majority		694	31.4	
Turnout		2,544	26.56	
Labour gain from Independent		Swing		

=== Walkden North ===
Walkden North
Party	Candidate	Votes	%	±%
Labour Co-op	Adrian Brocklehurst*	1,201	53.9	
Conservative	James Macdonald	421	18.9	
UKIP	Bernard Gill	148	6.6	
Green	Diana Battersby	114	5.1	
Liberal Democrats	Joseph Harmer	73	3.3	
Majority		780	35.0	
Turnout		1,961	24.48	
Labour Co-op hold		Swing		

=== Walkden South ===
Walkden South
Party	Candidate	Votes	%	±%
Labour	Laura Edwards	1,460	50.5	
Conservative	Anne Broomhead	1,157	40.0	
Green	Thomas Dylan	159	5.5	
Liberal Democrats	David Cowpe	113	3.9	
Majority		303	10.5	
Turnout		2,895	35.30	
Labour gain from Conservative		Swing		

=== Weaste and Seedley ===
Weaste and Seedley
Party	Candidate	Votes	%	±%
Labour Co-op	Ronnie Wilson*	1,302	59.8	
Conservative	Nicky Turner	390	17.9	
UKIP	Barrie Fallows	205	9.4	
Liberal Democrats	Andy Markham	147	6.7	
Green	Rob Stephenson	134	6.2	
Majority		912	41.9	
Turnout		2,185	23.52	
Labour Co-op hold		Swing		

=== Winton ===
Winton
Party	Candidate	Votes	%	±%
Labour	Margaret Morris*	1,323	63.5	
Conservative	George Darlington	417	20.0	
Green	Jenna Murray	129	6.2	
UKIP	Brian Robinson	116	5.6	
Liberal Democrats	Stuart Thomas	53	2.5	
TUSC	Sally Griffiths	46	2.2	
Majority		906	43.5	
Turnout		2,091	23.09	
Labour hold		Swing		

=== Worsley ===
Worsley
Party	Candidate	Votes	%	±%
Conservative	Les Turner	1,705	59.0	
Labour	Tony Davies	841	29.1	
Liberal Democrats	Sara Ryder	185	6.4	
Green	Christopher Bertenshaw	158	5.5	
Majority		864	29.9	
Turnout		2,896	35.56	
Conservative hold		Swing		
