= 2016 Salford City Council election =

2016 local election in England

2016 local election results in Salford

The 2016 Salford City Council election took place on 5 May 2016 to elect members of Salford City Council in England. This was on the same day as other local elections and the Salford Mayoral election. In April 2016, it was revealed that the Liberal Democrats would not be fielding any candidates in Salford.

This result had the following consequences for the total number of seats on the council after the elections:

Party	Previous council	New council
Labour	50	50
Conservative	9	9
Independent	1	1
Total	60	60
Working majority	40	40

== Ward results ==
Asterisks denote incumbent Councillors seeking re-election.

=== Barton ===
Barton
Party	Candidate	Votes	%	±%
Labour	John Anthony Mullen*	1,398	60.3	+3.2
UKIP	Glyn Alan Wright	445	19.2	N/A
Conservative	Hilary Brunyee	287	12.4	−9.4
Green	Daniel Towers	124	5.4	−4.0
TUSC	Susan Katrina Wright	46	2.0	−2.9
British Resistance	Wayne Tomlinson	17	0.7	N/A
Majority		953	41.1	+5.8
Turnout		2317	26.8	−26.5
Labour hold		Swing		

=== Boothstown and Ellenbrook ===
Boothstown and Ellenbrook
Party	Candidate	Votes	%	±%
Conservative	Bob Clarke	1,389	50.6	−7.2
Labour	Lee Colin Rowbotham	739	26.9	−4.3
UKIP	Joseph William Evans	386	14.1	N/A
Green	Lauren Amy Barnes	192	7.0	−1.1
TUSC	Kit Watson	23	0.8	−1.4
Majority		650	23.7	−2.8
Turnout		2744	36.8	−30.7
Conservative hold		Swing		

=== Broughton ===
Broughton
Party	Candidate	Votes	%	±%
Labour Co-op	Jim King*	1,580	64.4	−2.1
UKIP	Shneur Zalman	368	15.0	N/A
Conservative	Yonie Saunders	280	11.4	−5.0
Green	David Jones	159	6.5	−3.6
TUSC	Andrew Sherratt	39	1.6	−3.6
Majority		1212	49.4	−0.7
Turnout		2452	26.1	−21.0
Labour Co-op hold		Swing		

=== Cadishead ===
Cadishead
Party	Candidate	Votes	%	±%
Labour	John David Walsh	1,220	55.2	−0.4
UKIP	Stephen Ferrer	409	18.5	N/A
Conservative	Dorothy Chapman	367	16.6	−12.6
Green	Diane Cawood	158	7.2	−1.8
TUSC	Melissa Andrews	38	1.7	−3.7
Majority		811	36.7	+10.3
Turnout		2209	27.6	−27.8
Labour hold		Swing		

=== Claremont ===
Claremont
Party	Candidate	Votes	%	±%
Labour	Barbara Anne Bentham	1,294	47.7	+2.6
UKIP	Mary Ferrer	666	24.6	+2.9
Conservative	Bob Goodall	489	18.0	−1.6
Green	Dane Alexander Yates	245	9.0	+3.1
Majority		628	23.2	−0.2
Turnout		2712	33.4	−29.4
Labour hold		Swing		

=== Eccles ===
Eccles
Party	Candidate	Votes	%	±%
Labour	Peter Wheeler*	1,873	61.7	+13.4
Conservative	Jonathan Alan Boot	707	23.3	−1.6
Green	Helen Margaret Alker	284	9.4	+3.3
TUSC	Sally Griffiths	173	5.7	+3.4
Majority		1166	38.4	+15
Turnout		3037	34.9	−27.1
Labour hold		Swing		

=== Irlam ===
Irlam
Party	Candidate	Votes	%	±%
Labour	Tracy Jane Kelly*	1,118	58.3	+8.3
UKIP	Brian Norman Robinson	435	22.7	−0.8
Conservative	Noel Gaskell	248	12.9	−5.9
Green	Barry Woodling	58	3.0	−2.6
TUSC	Michelle Joy O'Mahoney	43	2.2	+1.0
Majority		683	35.6	+4.4
Turnout		1917	27.8	−27.4
Labour hold		Swing		

=== Irwell Riverside ===
Irwell Riverside
Party	Candidate	Votes	%	±%
Labour	Stephen Coen*	1,055	58.0	+3.2
UKIP	Katherine Alder	316	17.4	+1.5
Green	Wendy Kay Olsen	233	12.8	−1.0
Conservative	Thomas Richard Chambers	180	9.9	−2.3
TUSC	Benjamin Wilkes	35	1.9	−0.5
Majority		739	40.6	+1.7
Turnout		1819	25.5	−13.4
Labour hold		Swing		

=== Kersal ===
Kersal
Party	Candidate	Votes	%	±%
Labour	Peter Connor*	1,219	46.7	−1.8
Conservative	Arnold Saunders	942	36.1	−6.9
UKIP	Seamus Martin	283	10.8	N/A
Green	Jason Peter Reading	113	4.3	−1.4
TUSC	Alan Metcalfe	31	1.2	−0.8
Majority		277	10.6	+5.1
Turnout		2611	31.5	−20.1
Labour hold		Swing		

There was a by-election held on 2 March 2017 following the resignation of the incumbent councillor. The ward was gained by the Conservative Party candidate, a local rabbi.

=== Langworthy ===
Langworthy
Party	Candidate	Votes	%	±%
Labour	Paul Anthony Longshaw	1,142	48.5	−6.4
UKIP	Christopher Barnes	586	24.9	+0.8
Independent	Mark Breeze	264	11.2	N/A
Conservative	Ian Macdoland	151	6.4	−4.0
Green	Ian Pattinson	139	5.9	−1.8
TUSC	Andrew Carss	45	1.9	−0.3
Majority		556	23.6	−7.2
Turnout		2353	27.6	−24.4
Labour hold		Swing		

=== Little Hulton ===
Little Hulton (2 seats)
Party	Candidate	Votes	%	±%
Labour	Robert Andrew Sharpe	1,171	30.6	
Labour	Colette Weir	837	21.7	
UKIP	Phil Bridge	648	16.9	
UKIP	Bod Skoczypec	416	10.9	
Conservative	Nathan Ian James	317	8.3	
Conservative	Matthew William Lightfoot	229	6.0	
Green	Frederick Roy Battersby	210	5.5	
Turnout		3828	21.0	−25.9
Labour hold		Swing		
Labour hold		Swing		

=== Ordsall ===
Ordsall
Party	Candidate	Votes	%	±%
Labour	Ray Mashiter*	1,521	58.9	+6.0
Conservative	Adam Robert Carney	370	14.3	−6.7
Green	Emma Sarah Louise Van Dyke	331	12.8	−1.3
UKIP	Owen Martin Hammond	280	10.8	−0.6
TUSC	Ashley Jade Taylor	48	1.9	−0.6
Majority		1151	44.6	+15.0
Turnout		2583	24.6	−28.3
Labour hold		Swing		

=== Pendlebury ===
Pendlebury
Party	Candidate	Votes	%	±%
Labour	Barry Warner*	1,287	48.4	−0.1
UKIP	Andy Olsen	728	27.4	+2.3
Conservative	Jonathan Grosskopf	373	14.0	−5.9
Green	Paul Brighouse	161	6.1	+1.5
TUSC	Sean Warren	77	2.9	+1.4
Republic Party	Stuart Cremins	21	0.8	N/A
Majority		559	21.0	−2.4
Turnout		2660	29.9	−27.2
Labour hold		Swing		

=== Swinton North ===
Swinton North
Party	Candidate	Votes	%	±%
Labour Co-op	Derek Antrobus*	1,340	61.6	+7.3
UKIP	Stacey Olsen	619	23.2	+1.9
Conservative	Sharon Bulmer	500	18.8	−1.9
Green	Steven John Willett	137	5.1	N/A
TUSC	Norma Frances Parkinson-Green	67	2.5	−0.8
Majority		721	27.1	−5.9
Turnout		2663	31.8	−27.5
Labour Co-op hold		Swing		

=== Swinton South ===
Swinton South
Party	Candidate	Votes	%	±%
Labour	Heather Fletcher	1,105	46.3	−0.4
UKIP	Joe O'Neill	579	24.2	+1.4
Conservative	Nicky Turner	443	18.5	−3.6
Green	Nicola Smith	161	6.7	+1.2
TUSC	Matt Kilsby	49	2.1	−0.2
English Democrat	Craig Holmes	43	1.8	N/A
British Resistance	Eddy O'Sullivan	9	0.4	N/A
Majority		526	22.0	−2.0
Turnout		2389	29.3	−28.3
Labour hold		Swing		

=== Walkden North ===
Walkden North
Party	Candidate	Votes	%	±%
Labour	Brendan Patrick Ryan*	1,146	54.1	+4.4
UKIP	Bernard Gill	526	24.8	+0.8
Conservative	Shazia Qayyum	243	11.5	−7.5
Green	Diana Joy Battersby	130	6.1	+1.9
TUSC	Terry Simmons	60	2.8	+0.2
Majority		620	29.3	+3.6
Turnout		2118	25.2	−28.2
Labour hold		Swing		

=== Walkden South ===
Walkden South
Party	Candidate	Votes	%	±%
Labour	Richard John Critchley*	1,421	43.4	+5.7
Conservative	Anne Susan Broomhead	1266	38.6	−2.8
UKIP	Ann Lord	390	11.9	−2.5
Green	Thomas Matthew Dylan	149	4.5	+0.1
TUSC	Jamie Carr	29	0.9	−0.6
Majority		155	4.7	
Turnout		3276	41.8	−23.4
Labour hold		Swing		

=== Weaste & Seedley ===
Weaste and Seedley
Party	Candidate	Votes	%	±%
Labour	Stephen Hesling*	1,268	51.5	+5.5
UKIP	Barrie Michael Fallows	591	24.0	+2.2
Conservative	Adam Charles Edward Kennaugh	342	13.9	−2.5
Green	Rob Stephenson	172	7.0	−0.1
TUSC	Becci Heagney	65	2.6	+0.1
Majority		677	27.5	+3.3
Turnout		2460	28.2	−27.6
Labour hold		Swing		

=== Winton ===
Winton
Party	Candidate	Votes	%	±%
Labour	David Anthony Lancaster*	1,381	58.3	+2.2
Conservative	George Andrew Darlington	404	17.0	−4.2
Independent	Paul Michael Doyle	271	11.4	+0.3
Green	Susan Mary O'Shea	171	7.2	+0.3
TUSC	Rob Royle	143	6.0	+2.2
Majority		977	41.2	+6.4
Turnout		2370	27.3	−28.2
Labour hold		Swing		

=== Worsley ===
Worsley
Party	Candidate	Votes	%	±%
Conservative	Karen Garrido*	1,833	56.0	+3.5
Labour	Stuart James Dickman	846	25.8	−0.6
UKIP	Andrew Townsend	372	11.4	−1.8
Green	Christopher Bertenshaw	179	5.5	−1.0
TUSC	Thomas James Alexander Thurman	26	0.8	0.0
Majority		987	30.1	+3.9
Turnout		3274	40.5	−30.6
Conservative hold		Swing		
