= Worsley and Westwood Park =

- Electoral ward
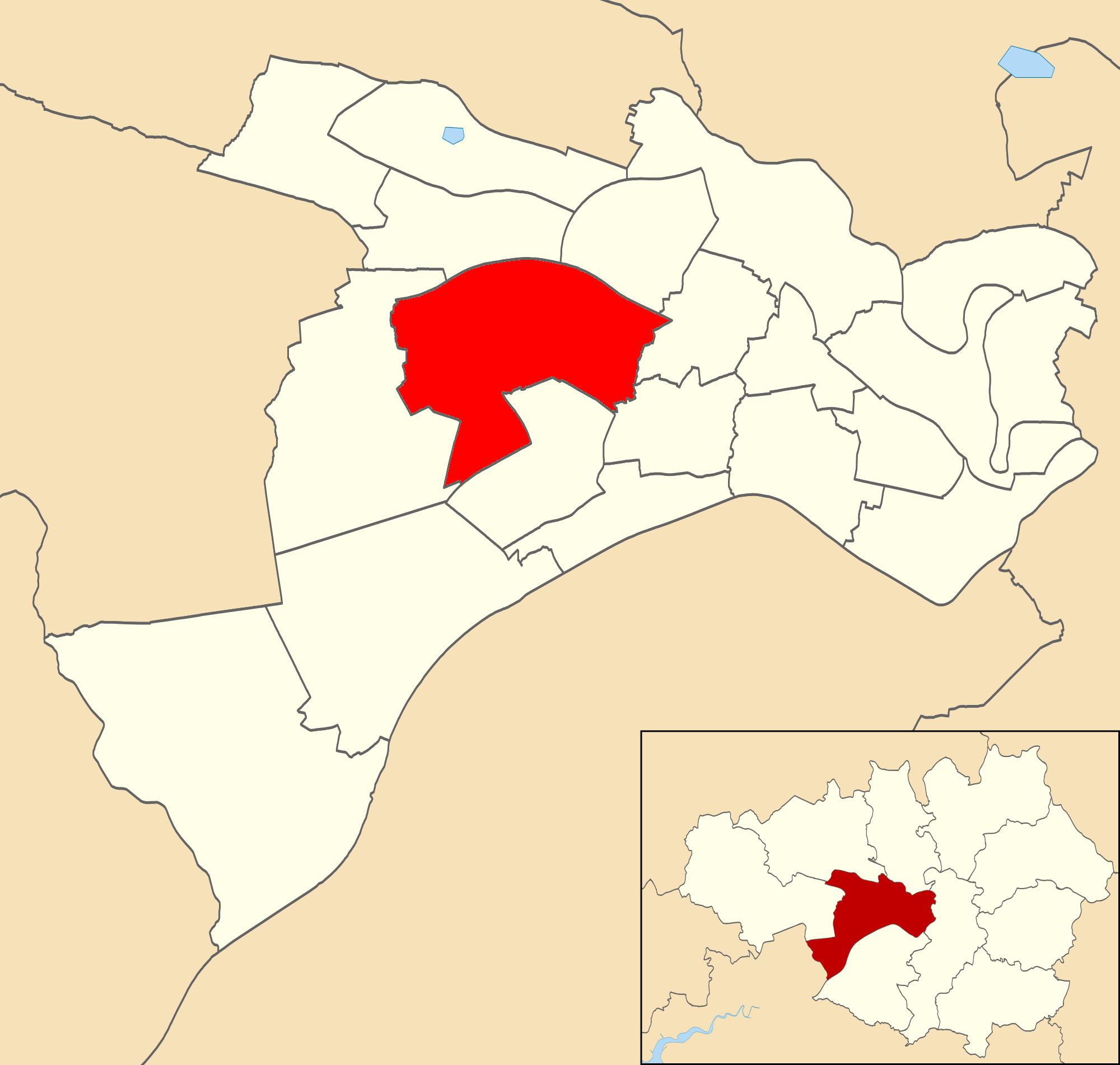
- Worsley ward within Salford City Council.

- Coat of arms
- Motto: Let the good (or safety) of the people be the supreme (or highest) law
- Interactive map of Worsley and Westwood Park
- Coordinates: 53.5008°N 2.3804°W
- Country: United Kingdom
- Constituent country: England
- Region: North West England
- County: Greater Manchester
- Metropolitan borough: Salford
- Created: May 2004
- Named for: Worsley

Government UK Parliament constituency: Worsley and Eccles South
  - Type: Unicameral
  - Body: Salford City Council
  - Mayor of Salford: Paul Dennett (Labour)
  - Councillor: Adam Kealey (Conservative)
  - Councillor: Robin Garrido (Conservative)
  - Councillor: James Prady (Labour)

Population
  - Total: 11,931
- Ward profile conducted by Salford City Council in 2020.

Worsley and Westwood Park is an electoral ward of Salford, England. It is represented in Westminster by Barbara Keeley MP for Worsley and Eccles South. A profile of the ward conducted by Salford City Council in 2014 recorded a population of 10,090. Formerly named Worsley, following extensive boundary changes to wards across the City of Salford, the ward was expanded to include Westwood Park, and the ward was renamed Worsley and Westwood Park. These new boundaries were first contested on 6 May 2021 in all-out elections, requiring all three ward councillors to stand for re-election.

== Councillors ==
The ward is represented by three councillors; Adam Kealey (Con), Robin Garrido (Con), and Karen Garrido (Con)

Election	Councillor	Councillor	Councillor
2004	Graham Compton (Con)	James McDonald (Con)	Karen Garrido (Con)
2006	Graham Compton (Con)	James McDonald (Con)	Karen Garrido (Con)
2007	Graham Compton (Con)	Ian MacDonald (Con)	Karen Garrido (Con)
2008	Graham Compton (Con)	Ian MacDonald (Con)	Karen Garrido (Con)
2010	Graham Compton (Con)	Ian MacDonald (Con)	Karen Garrido (Con)
2011	Graham Compton (Con)	Chris Clarkson (Con)	Karen Garrido (Con)
2012	Graham Compton (Con)	Chris Clarkson (Con)	Karen Garrido (Con)
2014	Graham Compton (Con)	Chris Clarkson (Con)	Karen Garrido (Con)
2015	Graham Compton (Con)	Chris Clarkson (Con)	Karen Garrido (Con)
2016	Graham Compton (Con)	Chris Clarkson (Con)	Karen Garrido (Con)
2018	Les Turner (Con)	Chris Clarkson (Con)	Karen Garrido (Con)
2019	Les Turner (Con)	Robin Garrido (Con)	Karen Garrido (Con)
2021	Tony Davies (Lab)	Robin Garrido (Con)	Karen Garrido (Con)
2022	Adam Kealey (Con)	Robin Garrido (Con)	Karen Garrido (Con)
2023	Adam Kealey (Con)	Robin Garrido (Con)	Karen Garrido (Con)

indicates seat up for re-election.

== Elections in 2020s ==
=== May 2023 ===
Worsley & Westwood Park
Party	Candidate	Votes	%	±%
Conservative	Robin Garrido*	1,392	48.2%	+0.2%
Labour	Michelle Mullen	1,166	40.3%	−2.7%
Green	Chris Bertenshaw	193	6.6%	new
Liberal Democrats	James Karl Blessing	124	4.2%	−4.1%
Majority		226	7.9%	+2.9%
Turnout		2,887	32.35%	−2.7%
Registered electors		8,922		
Conservative hold		Swing		

=== May 2022 ===
Worsley & Westwood Park (1 seat)
Party	Candidate	Votes	%	±%
Conservative	Adam Kealey	1,451	48.0%	+2.2%
Labour	Tony Davies*	1,298	43.0%	+4.2%
Liberal Democrats	James Blessing	251	8.3%	−0.4%
Majority		153	5.1%	
Turnout		3,020	33.86%	−1.19%
Registered electors		8,920		
Conservative gain from Labour		Swing		

=== May 2021 ===
2021
Party	Candidate	Votes	%	±%
Conservative	Karen Garrido	1,440	18.24	N/A
Conservative	Robin Garrido	1,224	15.51	N/A
Labour	Tony Davies	1,220	15.46	N/A
Conservative	Adam Kealey	1,082	13.71	N/A
Labour	Michelle Mullen	1,007	12.76	N/A
Labour	Ben Grogan	850	10.77	N/A
Green	Chris Bertenshaw	456	5.78	N/A
Liberal Democrats	James Blessing	275	3.48	N/A
Liberal Democrats	Stuart Robbins	209	2.65	N/A
Liberal Democrats	Daniel Wells	130	1.65	N/A
Turnout		7,893	35.05	N/A
Conservative win (new seat)				
Conservative win (new seat)				
Labour win (new seat)				

Boundary changes in wards across the City of Salford meant that all three councillors in each ward were required to stand for re-election in the May 2020 poll, although this was postponed for one year due to the COVID-19 pandemic.

== Elections in 2010s ==
=== May 2019 ===
2019
Party	Candidate	Votes	%	±%
Conservative	Robin Garrido	1,488	51.47	
Labour	Norman Owen	586	20.27	
Green	Chris Bertenshaw	307	10.62	
Liberal Democrats	Ian Chisnall	264	6.4	
UKIP	Arthur Snelgrove	223	7.71	
Majority		902	31.2	
Turnout		2,896	35.71	
Conservative hold		Swing		

=== May 2018 ===
2018
Party	Candidate	Votes	%	±%
Conservative	Les Turner	1,705	59.0	
Labour	Tony Davies	841	29.1	
Liberal Democrats	Sara Ryder	185	6.4	
Green	Chris Bertenshaw	158	5.5	
Majority		864	29.9	
Turnout		2,896	35.56	
Conservative hold		Swing		

=== May 2016 ===
2016
Party	Candidate	Votes	%	±%
Conservative	Karen Garrido*	1,833	56.0	+3.5
Labour	Stuart James Dickman	846	25.8	−0.6
UKIP	Andrew Townsend	372	11.4	−1.8
Green	Chris Bertenshaw	179	5.5	−1.0
TUSC	Thomas James Alexander Thurman	26	0.8	0.0
Majority		987	30.1	+3.9
Turnout		3,274	40.5	−30.6
Conservative hold		Swing		

=== May 2015 ===
2015
Party	Candidate	Votes	%	±%
Conservative	Chris Clarkson*	3,054	52.5	+6.1
Labour	John Roberts	1,533	26.4	−4.4
UKIP	Andrew Townsend	770	13.2	+4.3
Green	Chris Bertenshaw	380	6.5	N/A
TUSC	Kit Watson	44	0.8	N/A
Majority		1,521	26.2	+10.5
Turnout		5,814	71.1	+27.5
Conservative hold		Swing		

=== May 2014 ===
2014
Party	Candidate	Votes	%	±%
Conservative	Graham Compton*	1,520	48.9	−4.3
Labour	Amy Coffey	718	23.1	−3.8
UKIP	Andrew Townsend	609	19.6	N/A
Green	Chris Bertenshaw	262	8.4	N/A
Majority		802	28.8	−27.4
Turnout				
Conservative hold		Swing		

=== May 2012 ===
2012
Party	Candidate	Votes	%	±%
Conservative	Karen Garrido*	1,832	58.3	−11.2
Labour	David Hierons	770	24.5	+7.7
UKIP	Andrew Townsend	374	11.9	N/A
Liberal Democrats	Stephen Ferrer	167	5.3	−8.4
Majority		1,062	33.8	
Turnout		3,172	38.4	−3.7
Conservative hold		Swing		

=== May 2011 ===
2011
Party	Candidate	Votes	%	±%
Conservative	Chris Clarkson	1,761	47.9	−15.6
Labour	Gena Merrett	1,137	30.9	+13.5
Liberal Democrats	Robert Boyd	448	12.2	−0.8
UKIP	Andrew Townsend	330	8.9	N/A
Majority		624	16.9	−9.1
Conservative hold		Swing		

=== May 2010 ===
2010
Party	Candidate	Votes	%	±%
Conservative	Graham Compton*	3,065	52.8	−16.7
Labour	Michelle Mullen	1,552	26.7	+9.9
Liberal Democrats	Christine Corry	1,146	19.7	+6.0
Majority		1,513	26.0	−26.7
Turnout		5,810	71.3	+29.2
Conservative hold		Swing		

== Elections in 2000s ==
2008
Party	Candidate	Votes	%	±%
Conservative	Karen Garrido	2,411	69.5	+6.0
Labour	John Ferguson	582	16.8	−0.6
Liberal Democrats	Sheila Mulleady	476	13.7	+0.7
Majority		1,829	52.7	
Turnout			42.1	
Conservative hold		Swing		

2007
Party	Candidate	Votes	%	±%
Conservative	Ian MacDonald*	2,086	63.5	
Labour	Warren Coates	570	17.4	
Liberal Democrats	Christine Corry	427	13.0	
Green	Diana Battersby	201	6.1	
Majority		1,516		
Turnout		3,284	40.5	
Conservative hold		Swing		

2006
Party	Candidate	Votes	%	±%
Conservative	Graham Compton	1,980	61.8	
Liberal Democrats	James Gregory	649	20.3	
Labour	Warren Coates	573	17.9	
Majority		1,331	41.5	
Turnout		3,202	37.8	−12.6
Conservative hold		Swing		

2004
Party	Candidate	Votes	%	±%
Conservative	Chris Clarkson*	3,054	52.5	+6.1
Labour	John Roberts	1,533	26.4	−4.4
UKIP	Andrew Townsend	770	13.2	+4.3
Green	Chris Bertenshaw	380	6.5	N/A
TUSC	Kit Watson	44	0.8	N/A
Majority		1,521	26.2	+10.5
Turnout		5,814	71.1	+27.5
Conservative hold		Swing		
