= Cary baronets =

Baronetcy in the Baronetage of the United Kingdom

The Cary Baronetcy, of Withington in the County Palatine of Lancaster, is a title in the Baronetage of the United Kingdom. It was created on 12 July 1955 for the Conservative politician Sir Robert Cary, Kt. He represented Eccles and Withington in the House of Commons. As of 2022 the title is held by his grandson, the third Baronet, who succeeded in 2011.

== Cary baronets, of Withington (1955) ==
Escutcheon of the Cary baronets of Withington

- Sir Robert Archibald Cary, 1st Baronet (1898–1979)
- Sir Roger Hugh Cary, 2nd Baronet (1926–2011)
- Sir Nicolas Robert Hugh Cary, 3rd Baronet (born 1955)

The heir apparent is the present holder's son Alexander Robert Cary (born 1981).
