= Alfred Egerton =

British Conservative politician

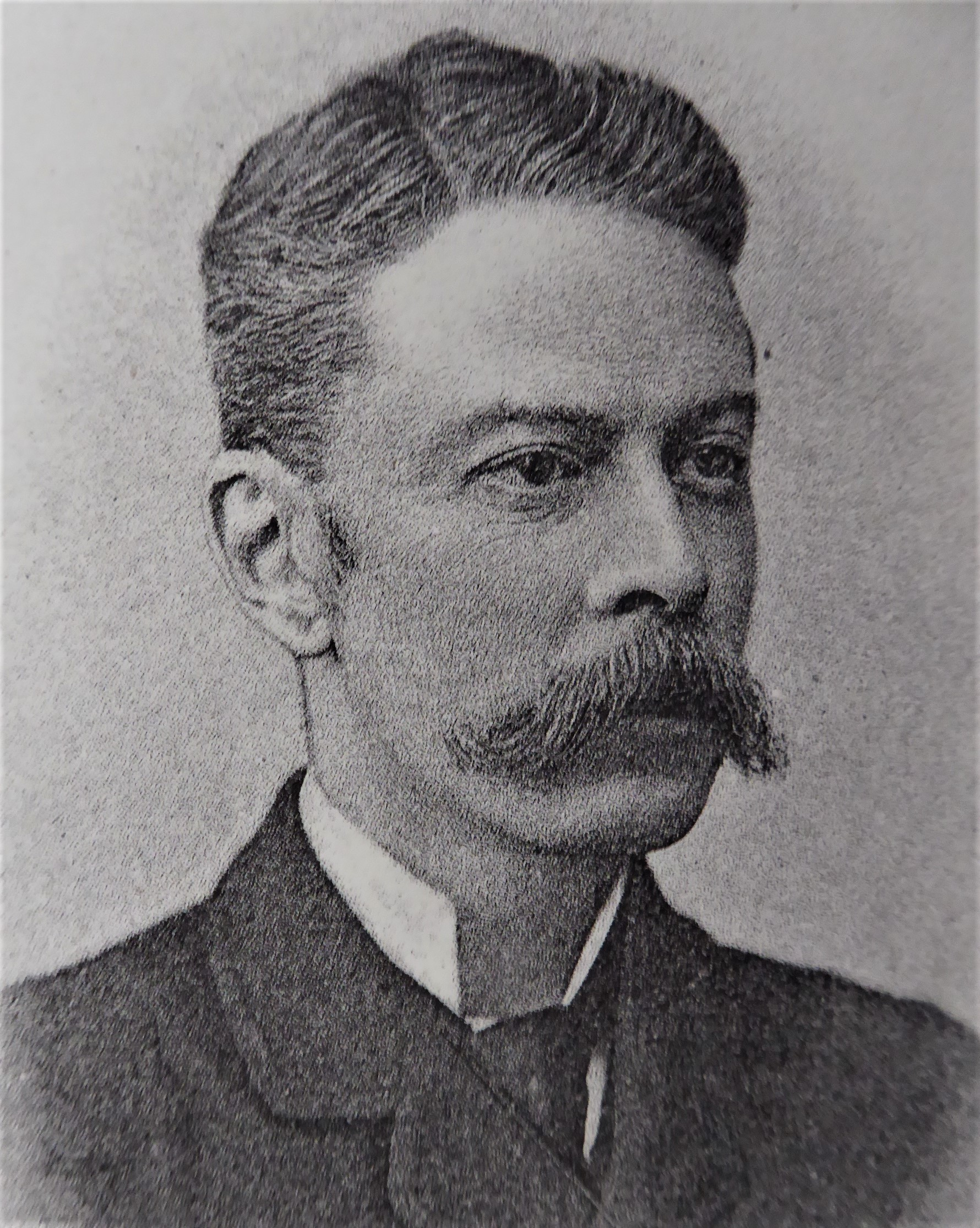
Alfred Egerton

The Honourable Alfred John Francis Egerton (6 February 1854 – 25 September 1890), was a British Conservative politician from the Egerton family.

He was the youngest son of the Second Earl of Ellesmere and Lady Mary Campbell. He was educated at Eton College, joining the Grenadier Guards aged 18 and served seven years as a lieutenant. He married Isabelle Clarisande Gertrude Gorges in 1881.

In 1885 he was elected as Conservative MP for Eccles in Lancashire, and was re-elected in the following year. His last public address was at Worsley Primrose League on 7 July 1888.

He died after a long illness (consumption) at Burwood House, his mother's residence in 1890, aged 36.

Parliament of the United Kingdom
New constituency	Member of Parliament for Eccles; 1885–1890	Succeeded by Henry John Roby
