= Worsley and Eccles South =

UK Parliament constituency (2010–2024)

Coordinates: 53.509560°N 2.385972°W

- Former county constituency for the House of Commons
- Boundary of Worsley and Eccles South in Greater Manchester for the 2010 general election

- Location of Greater Manchester within England
- County: Greater Manchester
- Electorate: 73,409 (December 2010)
- Major settlements: Worsley, Walkden, Little Hulton, Irlam, Cadishead

2010–2024
- Seats: One
- Created from: Worsley; Eccles
- Replaced by: Worsley and Eccles

Worsley and Eccles South was a county constituency in Greater Manchester in the House of Commons of the Parliament of the United Kingdom. It was represented since its 2010 creation until abolition by Barbara Keeley of the Labour Party.

Further to the completion of the 2023 Periodic Review of Westminster constituencies, the seat was abolished. Subject to boundary changes, incorporating in the whole of the town of Eccles, it was reformed as Worsley and Eccles, to be first contested at the 2024 general election.

== Constituency profile ==
The constituency covered the western half of the City of Salford, mostly safe Labour territory, but the seat also contained two of the Conservatives' strongest wards in the relatively affluent areas of Worsley and Boothstown & Ellenbrook; these are also the only two Remain-voting wards in the constituency. Worsley itself is a desirable area with attractions including historic manor houses along the Bridgewater Canal and the recently opened 150-acre RHS Garden Bridgewater.

The largest town is Walkden, mostly Labour-leaning, and it also includes the Little Hulton council estate. The "Eccles South" signifies the Barton and Winton suburbs of the town of Eccles. In the far south-west of the constituency along the ship canal were the villages of Irlam and Cadishead, separated from the other settlements by swathes of green belt land and farms in the form of Chat Moss, a protected peatland area.

In the 2019 general election, the BBC's exit poll forecast it as a Conservative gain, but it was not in fact among the many leave-supporting red wall seats to fall, and Labour held on although with a reduced, albeit comfortable, majority.

== Boundaries ==
Map of boundaries 2021–2024

Following its 2006 review of parliamentary representation in Greater Manchester, the Boundary Commission for England recommended the creation of a modified Worsley constituency, incorporating a part of Eccles, to be called Worsley and Eccles South.

Following council boundary changes that took effect in 2021, the electoral wards included in the Worsley and Eccles South constituency are currently Barton & Winton, Boothstown and Ellenbrook, Cadishead & Lower Irlam, Higher Irlam & Peel Green Ward, Little Hulton, Walkden North, Walkden South, Worsley & Westwood Park.

The electoral wards originally making up the seat were named Barton, Boothstown and Ellenbrook, Cadishead, Irlam, Little Hulton, Walkden North, Walkden South, Winton, Worsley.

== Members of Parliament ==
Election	Member	Party
2010	Barbara Keeley	Labour

== Elections ==
=== Elections in the 2010s ===
General election 2019: Worsley and Eccles South
Party	Candidate	Votes	%	±%
Labour	Barbara Keeley	20,446	45.7	−11.4
Conservative	Arnie Saunders	17,227	38.5	−0.2
Brexit Party	Seamus Martin	3,224	7.2	New
Liberal Democrats	Joe Johnson-Tod	2,510	5.6	+3.2
Green	Daniel Towers	1,300	2.9	+1.1
Majority		3,219	7.2	−11.2
Turnout		44,707	59.4	−2.5
Labour hold		Swing	−5.6	

General election 2017: Worsley and Eccles South
Party	Candidate	Votes	%	±%
Labour	Barbara Keeley	26,046	57.1	+12.8
Conservative	Iain Lindley	17,667	38.7	+8.6
Liberal Democrats	Kate Clarkson	1,087	2.4	−0.2
Green	Tom Dylan	842	1.8	−1.1
Majority		8,379	18.4	+4.3
Turnout		45,642	61.9	+3.6
Labour hold		Swing	+2.1	

General election 2015: Worsley and Eccles South
Party	Candidate	Votes	%	±%
Labour	Barbara Keeley	18,600	44.2	+1.3
Conservative	Iain Lindley	12,654	30.1	−2.4
UKIP	Owen Hammond	7,688	18.3	+13.4
Green	Chris Bertenshaw	1,242	3.0	New
Liberal Democrats	Kate Clarkson	1,100	2.6	−13.9
TUSC	Steve North	380	0.9	New
Reality Party	Mags McNally	200	0.5	New
Independent	Geoffrey Berg	184	0.4	New
Majority		5,946	14.1	+3.7
Turnout		42,048	58.3	+0.8
Labour hold		Swing	+1.9	

General election 2010: Worsley and Eccles South
Party	Candidate	Votes	%	±%
Labour	Barbara Keeley	17,892	42.9	
Conservative	Iain Lindley	13,555	32.5	
Liberal Democrats	Richard Gadsden	6,883	16.5	
UKIP	Andrew Townsend	2,037	4.9	
English Democrat	Paul Whitelegg	1,334	3.2	
Majority		4,337	10.4	
Turnout		41,701	57.5	
Labour win (new seat)				

== See also ==
- List of parliamentary constituencies in Greater Manchester
