= Terry Lewis (politician) =

British politician (1935–2026)

Terence Lewis

Member of Parliament for Worsley
- In office 9 June 1983 – 11 April 2005
- Preceded by: Constituency Established
- Succeeded by: Barbara Keeley

Personal details
- Born: 29 December 1935
- Died: 20 July 2026 (aged 90)
- Party: Labour (until 2010)

Terence Lewis (29 December 1935 – 20 July 2026), known as Terry Lewis, was a British politician. He was educated at Mount Carmel School, Salford, and did his National Service in the Royal Army Medical Corps before becoming a Personnel Officer. He was elected as the Labour member of parliament for Worsley, Greater Manchester, in 1983. He retired at the 2005 general election and was succeeded by Barbara Keeley of Labour.

In 2010 Lewis announced his resignation from the Labour Party, saying that it had 'lost its soul'.

Lewis died on 20 July 2026, aged 90.

== Elections contested ==
Date	Constituency	Party	Votes	% votes	Position	% majority	Ref.
1983 general election	Worsley	Labour	21,675	40.3	Won	7.7	
1987 general election	Worsley	Labour	27,157	48.1	Won	13.0	
1992 general election	Worsley	Labour	15,911	52.4	Won	17.8	
1997 general election	Worsley	Labour	29,083	62.2	Won	38.0	
2001 general election	Worsley	Labour	20,193	57.1	Won	33.3	

Parliament of the United Kingdom
Preceded by Constituency Established	Member of Parliament for Worsley; 1983–2005	Succeeded by Barbara Keeley
