= Octavius Leigh-Clare =

British politician

Leigh-Clare in 1895.

Octavius Leigh Leigh-Clare (6 July 1841 – 16 July 1912) was a British barrister and Conservative politician.

Originally known as Octavius Leigh Clare, he was the son of William Clare, a Liverpool banker, and his wife Elizabeth née Leigh. He was educated at Rossall School and St John's College, Cambridge. He graduated in 1864 with a BA in the mathematical tripos. Clare was called to bar at the Inner Temple in January 1866. Initially he practised as conveyancer and equity draftsman. He built up an expertise in mining law, which led to him being retained as counsel in a number of Lancashire mining cases. He was also the principal lawyer employed by the Manchester Ship Canal company. He was made a bencher in 1900, and became a member of the General Council of the Bar.

In 1868 he married Harriet Huson, who died in 1885. He was married for a second time in 1889 to Jane Maria Wigan. In the same year he assumed the additional surname of "Leigh".

In 1901 He and his second wife were living in Hindley Cottage, Richmond on Thames with their five children and the family were served by a staff of five servants.

He stood as Conservative candidate for the parliamentary constituency of Eccles at the 1892 general election, but was unsuccessful. Three years later another election was held, and Leigh-Clare was elected to serve as Member of Parliament for Eccles. In 1905 he was appointed as Vice Chancellor of the Duchy of Lancaster. At the ensuing general election in 1906, he did not seek re-election.

Parliament of the United Kingdom
Preceded by Henry John Roby	Member of Parliament for Eccles; 1895–1906	Succeeded by Sir George Herbert Pollard
