= John Potter (Conservative politician) =

John Potter (9 November 1873 – 5 May 1940) was a Conservative Party politician in the United Kingdom.

At the 1931 general election, he was elected as member of parliament (MP) for Eccles, but stood down at the 1935 election.

Potter had previously stood, unsuccessfully, at the 1922 general election in Batley and Morley.

Parliament of the United Kingdom
Preceded by David Mort	Member of Parliament for Eccles; 1931–1935	Succeeded by Sir Robert Cary, 1st Baronet
