= 2019 Salford City Council election =

Local election in Salford, England, 2019

Results of the 2019 Salford City Council election

The 2019 Salford City Council election to elect members of Salford City Council in England took place on 2 May 2019. This was on the same day as other local elections.

== Ward results ==
Declared candidates. Asterisk denotes the sitting councillor.

=== Barton ===
Barton
Party	Candidate	Votes	%	±%
Labour	Michele Barnes*	1,201	53.7	−10.5
UKIP	Janice Snelgrove	470	21.0	+21.9
Green	Jennifer Mellish	302	13.5	+8.2
Conservative	Adam Robert Carney	245	11.0	−7.8
Majority		731	32.7	−8.1
Turnout		2,237	23.91	+1.06
Labour hold		Swing		

=== Boothstown and Ellenbrook ===
Boothstown and Ellenbrook
Party	Candidate	Votes	%	±%
Conservative	Darren Ward	1,378	52.2	
Labour	Phil Cusack	731	27.7	
Green	Diana Joy Battersby	314	11.9	
UKIP	John Kenneth Bailey	200	7.6	
Majority		647	24.5	
Turnout		2,641	34.94	
Conservative hold		Swing		

=== Broughton ===
Broughton
Party	Candidate	Votes	%	±%
Labour	Charlie McIntyre*	1,220	56.7	
Conservative	Sven Mikael Persson	332	15.4	
UKIP	Stephen John O'Neill	326	15.1	
Green	David Jones	275	12.8	
Majority		888		
Turnout		2,163	21.48	
Labour hold		Swing		

=== Cadishead ===
Cadishead
Party	Candidate	Votes	%	±%
Labour	Lewis Eric Nelson	1,049	40.1	
Independent	Dave Pike	985	37.6	
UKIP	Stephen Tarry	260	9.9	
Conservative	Nigel Andrew Gilmore	197	7.5	
Green	Diane Cawood	128	4.9	
Majority		64		
Turnout		2,627	32.38	
Labour hold		Swing		

=== Claremont ===
Claremont
Party	Candidate	Votes	%	±%
Labour	Michael Thomas Pevitt*	860	34.5	
UKIP	James Miller	409	16.4	
Green	Bryan Blears	379	15.2	
Liberal Democrats	Jake Overend	320	12.8	
Conservative	Jackie Mountaine	290	11.6	
Independent	Mary Ferrer	235	9.4	
Majority		451		
Turnout		2,505	30.36	
Labour hold		Swing		

=== Eccles ===
Eccles
Party	Candidate	Votes	%	±%
Labour	Sharmina August	1,272	44.5	
Conservative	David William Hotchkin	463	16.2	
UKIP	Keith Carter Hallam	361	12.6	
Green	Helen Alker	356	12.4	
Liberal Democrats	Lucas Webber	198	6.9	
Independent	Stef Lorenz	93	3.3	
Women's Equality	Annie Wood	86	3.0	
Socialist	Sally Griffiths	31	1.1	
Majority		809		
Turnout		2,875	31	
Labour hold		Swing		

=== Irlam ===
Irlam
Party	Candidate	Votes	%	±%
Independent	Darren John Goulden	856	39.8	
Labour	Peter Taylor*	731	34.0	
UKIP	Brian Norman Robinson	281	13.1	
Conservative	Myrella Saunders	173	8.1	
Green	Daniel Towers	108	5.0	
Majority		125		
Turnout		2,148	30.07	
Independent gain from Labour		Swing		

=== Irwell Riverside ===
Irwell Riverside
Party	Candidate	Votes	%	±%
Labour	Ray Walker	829	49.1	
Green	Wendy Olsen	352	20.8	
UKIP	John L. Froggatt	254	15.0	
Conservative	Michael Richman	132	7.8	
Liberal Democrats	Ionel Mereuta	123	7.3	
Majority		477		
Turnout		1,075	22.33	
Labour hold		Swing		

=== Kersal ===
Kersal
Party	Candidate	Votes	%	±%
Conservative	Arnie Saunders*	1,415	56.4	
Labour	Phil Tresadern	630	25.1	
UKIP	Nicola Williamson	188	7.5	
Green	Robert Stephenson	172	6.9	
Veterans and People′s	Martin Austin Kenyon	104	4.1	
Majority		785		
Turnout		2,527	29.66	
Conservative hold		Swing		

=== Langworthy ===
Langworthy
Party	Candidate	Votes	%	±%
Labour	Gina Claire Reynolds*	911	56.8	
UKIP	Seamus Martin	347	21.6	
Conservative	Alan Lederberger	132	8.2	
Liberal Democrats	Joe Johnson-Tod	115	7.2	
For Britain	Neil Joseph James	70	4.4	
Socialist Alternative	Dane Yates	29	1.8	
Majority		564		
Turnout		1,797	20.33	
Labour hold		Swing		

=== Little Hulton ===
Little Hulton
Party	Candidate	Votes	%	±%
Labour	Kate Lewis*	933	50.9	
UKIP	Michael Frost	441	24.1	
Conservative	Lewis Leach	243	13.3	
Green	Frederick Roy Battersby	215	11.7	
Majority		492		
Turnout		1,839	19.7	
Labour hold		Swing		

=== Ordsall ===
Ordsall
Party	Candidate	Votes	%	±%
Labour	Ann-Marie Humphreys	1,267	47.9	
Green	Marie Piekarski	409	15.5	
Liberal Democrats	John Grant	300	11.4	
Conservative	Max Phillip Dowling	285	10.8	
UKIP	Michael James Felse	271	10.3	
Independent	Alex Haida	111	4.2	
Majority		858		
Turnout		2,657	19.62	
Labour hold		Swing		

=== Pendlebury ===
Pendlebury
Party	Candidate	Votes	%	±%
Labour	John Ferguson*	986	43.2	
UKIP	Jonathan Marsden	424	18.6	
Conservative	Luke Johnsen	316	13.8	
Independent	Joe O'Neill	238	10.4	
Green	Alastair Ian Dewberry	183	8.0	
Liberal Democrats	George Broadley	137	6.0	
Majority		562		
Turnout		2,302	25.09	
Labour hold		Swing		

=== Swinton North ===
Swinton North
Party	Candidate	Votes	%	±%
Labour	Jim Dawson*	1,160	50.7	
UKIP	Andy Olsen	437	19.1	
Conservative	Andy Cheetham	341	14.9	
Green	Liam Waite	210	9.2	
Liberal Democrats	Valerie Smith	142	6.2	
Majority		723		
Turnout		2,316	27.91	
Labour hold		Swing		

=== Swinton South ===
Swinton South
Party	Candidate	Votes	%	±%
Labour	Jim Cammell	815	34.7	
Independent	Carol Margaret Boyce	565	24.1	
UKIP	Stacey Olsen	347	14.8	
Conservative	Catherine Bisbey	304	12.9	
Green	Samuel Clarke	187	8.0	
Liberal Democrats	James Karl Blessing	130	5.5	
Majority		250		
Turnout		2,367	28.73	
Labour gain from Independent		Swing		

=== Walkden North ===
Walkden North
Party	Candidate	Votes	%	±%
Labour	Sammie Bellamy*	976	48.7	
UKIP	Bernard Gill	470	23.5	
Conservative	Ian Macdonald	296	14.8	
Green	Christopher Frederick Seed	255	12.8	
Majority		506		
Turnout		2,005	21.92	
Labour hold		Swing		

=== Walkden South ===
This election took place on 20 June 2019 as the original Conservative candidate George Darlington died following a stroke on 26 April 2019.

Walkden South
Party	Candidate	Votes	%	±%
Labour	Joshua Mark Brooks	802	39.6	
Conservative	David Simon Cawdrey	654	32.3	
Green	Thomas Matthew Dylan	254	12.6	
Liberal Democrats	John-Paul Atley	173	8.6	
UKIP	Tony Green	140	6.9	
Majority		148		
Turnout		2,030	23.7	
Labour gain from Conservative		Swing		

=== Weaste and Seedley ===
Weaste and Seedley
Party	Candidate	Votes	%	±%
Labour	Madeline Wade	1,006	43.9	
UKIP	Barrie Michael Fallows	421	18.4	
Independent	Paul Wilson*	303	13.2	
Green	Guy Nicholas Otten	220	9.6	
Conservative	Javaid Hussain	191	8.3	
Liberal Democrats	Andy Markham	148	6.5	
Majority		585		
Turnout		2,300	24.81	
Labour gain from Independent		Swing		

=== Winton ===
Winton
Party	Candidate	Votes	%	±%
Labour	Paula Boshell*	1,103	50.0	
UKIP	David Grant	497	22.5	
Conservative	Anne Susan Broomhead	309	14.0	
Green	Jenna Louise Sayer	296	13.4	
Majority		606		
Turnout		2,221	24.71	
Labour hold		Swing		

=== Worsley ===
Worsley
Party	Candidate	Votes	%	±%
Conservative	Robin John Garrido*	1,488	51.9	
Labour	Norman Joseph Owen	586	20.4	
Green	Christopher Bertenshaw	307	10.7	
Liberal Democrats	Ian Chisnall	264	9.2	
UKIP	Arthur Snelgrove	223	7.8	
Majority		902		
Turnout		2,891	35.71	
Conservative hold		Swing		
