= Lewis Carter-Jones =

British politician (1920–2004)

Lewis Carter-Jones CBE (17 November 1920 – 26 August 2004) was a British Labour Party politician.

== Early life ==
Carter-Jones was educated at Bridgend County School and University College of Wales, Aberystwyth. He was head of business studies at Yale Grammar Technical School, Wrexham, and a rugby union referee.

== Parliamentary career ==
Carter-Jones contested Chester in a 1956 by-election and at the 1959 general election. He was member of parliament for Eccles from 1964 general election until he retired at the 1987 general election. His successor was Joan Lestor.

Parliament of the United Kingdom
Preceded by William Proctor	Member of Parliament for Eccles; 1964–1987	Succeeded by Joan Lestor
