= 2011 Salford City Council election =

2011 UK local government election

Results of the 2011 Salford City Council election

The 2011 Salford City Council election took place on 5 May 2011 to elect members of Salford City Council in England. This was on the same day as other local elections.

Salford local elections are organised 'in thirds', with Councillors elected in 2007 defending their seats in 2011, with vote share changes calculated on that basis.

One third of the council was up for election. The Labour Party gained five seats and remains in overall control of the council. The results mirrored those of the 2010 elections with Labour winning the same seventeen wards and the Conservatives three wards.

The composition of the Council following the 2011 elections is:

Party	Seats	±
Labour	44	+5
Conservative	11	-2
Liberal Democrat	3	–2
Community Action	2	-1

== Ward results ==
Asterisks denote incumbent Councillors seeking re-election. Vote share changes compared with corresponding 2007 election.

=== Barton ward ===
Barton
Party	Candidate	Votes	%	±%
Labour	Michelle Mullen	1,705	62.0	+17.8
Conservative	Abdul Mannan	538	19.6	−1.8
Liberal Democrats	Ronald Benjamin	179	6.5	−13.0
Independent	Alan Valentine	327	11.9	N/A
Majority		1,167		
Turnout			32.2	
Labour hold		Swing		

=== Boothstown and Ellenbrook ward ===
Boothstown and Ellenbrook
Party	Candidate	Votes	%	±%
Conservative	Robin Garrido*	1,521	51.5	−7.4
Labour	Thomas Murphy	988	33.4	+13.3
Liberal Democrats	Sheila Mulleady	236	8.0	−7.7
UKIP	David Hudson	211	7.1	N/A
Majority				
Turnout				
Conservative hold		Swing		

=== Broughton ward ===
Broughton
Party	Candidate	Votes	%	±%
Labour	Charlie McIntyre*	1,701	74.7	+12.8
Conservative	Gary Green	264	11.6	−2.2
UKIP	Tony Williams	172	7.6	−16.8
Liberal Democrats	Bernard Carson	141	6.2	N/A
Majority		1,437		
Turnout		2,302	28.4	
Labour hold		Swing		

=== Cadishead ward ===
Cadishead
Party	Candidate	Votes	%	±%
Labour	Jimmy Hunt	1,647	60.4	+23.9
Conservative	Anthony Yates	639	23.4	−13.4
BNP	Brenda Leather	195	7.2	N/A
UKIP	Carol Jones	151	5.5	N/A
Liberal Democrats	Christopher Seed	94	3.4	−3.0
Majority				
Turnout				
Labour gain from Conservative		Swing		

=== Claremont ward ===
Claremont
Party	Candidate	Votes	%	±%
Labour	Joseph Johnson	1,540	49.8	+17.9
Liberal Democrats	Mary Ferrer	809	26.2	−11.4
Conservative	Nicholas Johnson	460	14.9	−3.7
UKIP	Glyn Wright	282	9.1	N/A
Majority		731		
Turnout		3,115	38.2	
Labour gain from Liberal Democrats		Swing		

=== Eccles ward ===
Eccles
Party	Candidate	Votes	%	±%
Labour	Lisa Stone	1,877	55.1	+15.4
Conservative	Ann Davies*	950	27.9	−15.9
UKIP	Paul Doyle	368	10.8	N/A
Liberal Democrats	Stephen Ferrer	213	6.3	−10.2
Majority		927		
Turnout		3,529	38.3	
Labour gain from Conservative		Swing		

=== Irlam ward ===
Irlam
Party	Candidate	Votes	%	±%
Labour	Joseph Kean*	1,658	67.6	+28.7
Conservative	Mandy Unwin	484	19.7	−2.5
Green	Jackie Anderson	215	8.8	N/A
Liberal Democrats	Melanie Owen	94	3.8	−3.5
Majority		1,174		
Turnout		2,461	34.2	
Labour hold		Swing		

=== Irwell Riverside ward ===
Irwell Riverside
Party	Candidate	Votes	%	±%
Labour	Stephen Ord	1,460	68.5	+12.1
Liberal Democrats	Janice Taylor	202	9.5	−11.9
BNP	Gary Tumulty	167	7.8	−3.6
UKIP	Alan Wright	92	4.3	N/A
Majority		1,251		
Turnout		2,158	23.1	
Labour hold		Swing		

=== Kersal ward ===
Kersal
Party	Candidate	Votes	%	±%
Labour	George Wilson*	1,566	52.7	+10.5
Conservative	David Wolfson	1,037	34.9	−5.9
UKIP	Doreen Pilling	208	7.0	N/A
Liberal Democrats	Harold Kershner	161	5.4	−11.6
Majority		1,251		
Turnout		2,158	23.1	
Labour hold		Swing		

=== Langworthy ward ===
Langworthy
Party	Candidate	Votes	%	±%
Labour	Gina Loveday*	1,400	58.5	+10.4
Liberal Democrats	Steve Middleton	368	15.4	−23.1
Conservative	George Darlington	198	8.3	−5.1
BNP	Keith Fairhurst	167	7.0	N/A
UKIP	Graeme Hulse	161	6.7	N/A
TUSC	Andy Behan	98	4.1	N/A
Majority		1,032		
Turnout		2,415	26.1	
Labour hold		Swing		

=== Little Hulton ward ===
Little Hulton
Party	Candidate	Votes	%	±%
Labour	Val Burgoyne	1,522	66.5	+13.5
Conservative	Con Wright	297	13.0	−3.2
English Democrat	David Johnson	200	8.7	N/A
UKIP	Ian Smith	165	7.2	N/A
Liberal Democrats	David Cowpe	106	4.6	−12.4
Majority		1,225		
Turnout		1,225	29.3	
Labour hold		Swing		

=== Ordsall ward ===
Ordsall
Party	Candidate	Votes	%	±%
Labour	Peter Dobbs*	1,236	52.9	−2.3
TUSC	George Tapp	381	16.3	N/A
Conservative	Marvin Herron	339	14.5	−2.1
Liberal Democrats	Kate Middleton	280	12.0	−7.4
UKIP	Michael Beesley	102	4.4	−4.4
Majority		855		
Turnout		2,367	26.1	
Labour hold		Swing		

=== Pendlebury ward ===
Pendlebury
Party	Candidate	Votes	%	±%
Labour	John Ferguson	1,811	60.7	+14.6
Conservative	Keyth Scoles	539	18.1	−5.3
BNP	Wayne Taylor	204	6.8	−6.8
UKIP	John Brereton	184	6.2	N/A
Liberal Democrats	Christine Corry	161	5.3	−11.6
Independent	Stuart Cremins	85	2.8	N/A
Majority		1,272		
Turnout		3,001	33	
Labour hold		Swing		

=== Swinton North ward ===
Swinton North
Party	Candidate	Votes	%	±%
Labour	James Dawson*	1,813	61.1	+9.8
Conservative	Mark Unwin	706	23.8	−1.5
Green	Reg Howard	251	8.5	N/A
Liberal Democrats	Valerie Gregory	196	6.6	−17.8
Majority		1,107		
Turnout		2,984	34.5	
Labour hold		Swing		

=== Swinton South ward ===
Swinton South
Party	Candidate	Votes	%	±%
Labour	Norbert Potter	1,356	47.4	+19.4
Green	Joe O'Neill	481	16.8	N/A
Conservative	Christine Allcock	553	19.3	+5.4
Liberal Democrats	Valerie Kelly	277	9.7	−31.9
UKIP	Angela Duffy	194	6.8	N/A
Majority		803		
Turnout		2,882	34.7	
Labour gain from Liberal Democrats		Swing		

=== Walkden North ward ===
Walkden North
Party	Candidate	Votes	%	±%
Labour	William Pennington*	1,604	64.5	+14.9
Conservative	Chris Bates	387	15.6	−11.3
English Democrat	Laurence Depares	193	7.8	N/A
UKIP	Paul Woodburn	188	7.6	−3.6
Liberal Democrats	Pauline Ogden	116	4.7	−7.6
Majority		1,217		
Turnout		2,515	29.8	
Labour hold		Swing		

=== Walkden South ward ===
Walkden South
Party	Candidate	Votes	%	±%
Conservative	Iain Lindley*	1,784	49.7	−1.3
Labour	Tracy Kelly	1,379	38.4	+11.3
UKIP	Albert Redshaw	167	4.7	N/A
Liberal Democrats	Susan Carson	142	4.0	−4.9
English Democrat	Paul Whitelegg	117	3.3	N/A
Majority		405	11.3	+7.4
Turnout			44.3	
Conservative hold		Swing		

=== Weaste and Seedley ward ===
Weaste and Seedley
Party	Candidate	Votes	%	±%
Labour Co-op	Jan Rochford	1,333	48.0	+6.6
Independent	Geoff Ainsworth*	439	15.8	N/A
Liberal Democrats	John Deas	406	14.6	−30.4
Conservative	Christopher Davies	377	13.6	+0.0
Green	Andy Olsen	222	8.0	N/A
Majority		894		
Turnout		2,799	33.3	
Labour Co-op gain from Liberal Democrats		Swing		

=== Winton ward ===
Winton
Party	Candidate	Votes	%	±%
Labour	Paula Boshell*	1,617	61.0	+19.6
Conservative	Anne Broomhead	475	17.9	1.8
UKIP	Bernard Gill	193	7.3	N/A
BNP	Stuart Henshaw	138	5.2	N/A
TUSC	Tony Moore	103	3.9	N/A
Liberal Democrats	Stephen Plaister	124	4.7	−34.3
Majority		1,142		
Turnout		2,668	30.8	
Labour hold		Swing		

=== Worsley ward ===
Worsley
Party	Candidate	Votes	%	±%
Conservative	Chris Clarkson	1,761	47.9	−15.6
Labour	Gena Merrett	1,137	30.9	+13.5
Liberal Democrats	Robert Boyd	448	12.2	−0.8
UKIP	Andrew Townsend	330	8.9	N/A
Majority		624	16.9	−9.1
Conservative hold		Swing		
