= William Proctor (British politician) =

William Thomas Proctor (1896 – 13 January 1967) was a Labour Party politician in the United Kingdom.

Proctor worked as a railway guard, and was secretary of the Pontypool branch of the National Union of Railwaymen and was a member of the Monmouthshire County Council. He was elected at the 1945 general election as Member of Parliament (MP) for Eccles, and held the seat until he retired from the House of Commons at the 1964 election.

Parliament of the United Kingdom
| Preceded by Sir Robert Cary, 1st Baronet | Member of Parliament for Eccles; 1945–1964 | Succeeded by Lewis Carter-Jones |
