= Ian Stewart (Labour politician) =

British Labour politician (born 1950)

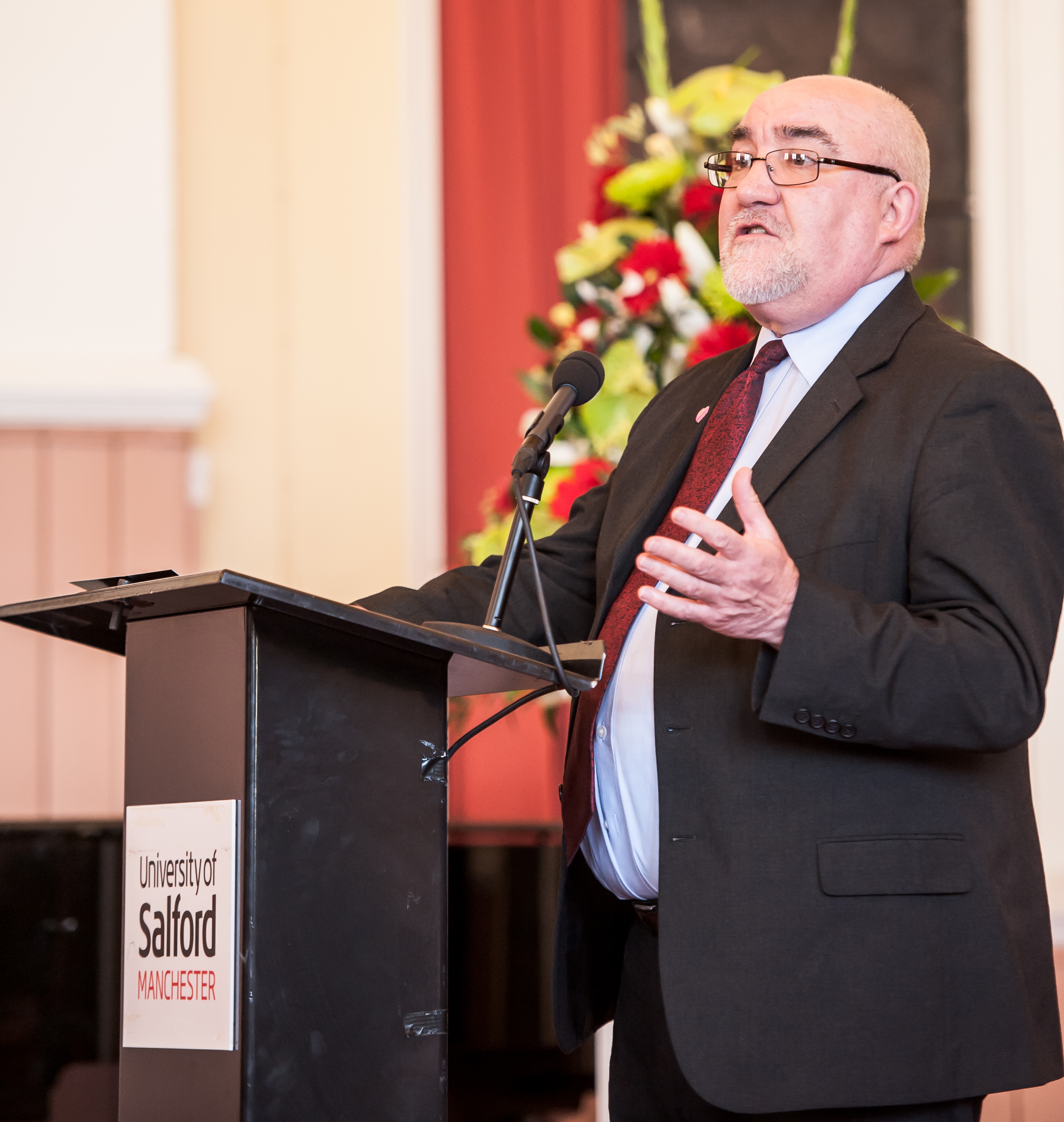
- Stewart in 2015

Mayor of Salford
- In office 7 May 2012 – 8 May 2016
- Preceded by: office established
- Succeeded by: Paul Dennett

Member of Parliament for Eccles
- In office 1 May 1997 – 12 April 2010
- Preceded by: Joan Lestor
- Succeeded by: Constituency Abolished

Personal details
- Born: 28 August 1950 (age 75) Blantyre, South Lanarkshire, Scotland, UK
- Party: Labour
- Spouse: Merilyn Holding
- Education: Manchester Metropolitan University

Ian Stewart (born 28 August 1950) is a British Labour Party politician who was the member of parliament (MP) for Eccles from 1997 until 2010, when his seat was abolished and he was subsequently defeated in the selection process to be the Labour Parliamentary Candidate for the new parliamentary constituency of Salford and Eccles by Hazel Blears.

Standing as the Labour candidate for the new elected post of Mayor of Salford, he was elected as Mayor in the 2012 Salford mayoral election.

== Early life ==
Stewart attended Calder Street Junior Secondary School (now Auchinraith Primary School) in Blantyre and Alfred Turner Secondary Modern in Irlam. From 1966 to 1969, he studied at Stretford Technical College. He later attended Manchester Metropolitan University, where he carried out research towards a M.Phil in Management of Change. Stewart worked as a chemical plant operator from 1973 to 1978 before becoming the North West Regional Officer of the Transport and General Workers Union.

== MP for Eccles ==
Stewart was first elected as member of parliament (MP) for Eccles in 1997. He was a member of the All-Party Parliamentary Football Team.

== Mayor of Salford ==
Upon his election as Mayor of Salford in 2012, Stewart appointed one deputy and 13 assistant mayors, including one in charge of 'humanegement', a nonsense word invented by Stewart to refer to human resources.

In 2013, Stewart urged the government to rethink spending cuts claiming thousands of residents will be pushed further into poverty, saying: "Salford has been forced to cut almost £100 million from council services since 2010. We have tried to increase our income in a number of ways, but it is an uphill battle. Without this funding I fear for the many families who are being asked to contribute more, whilst they have suffered a loss in benefits income."

In October 2013, Stewart launched the 'City Plan' which set the priories of Salford City Council over the following three years. Stewart said: "It is my firm hope that the City Plan will help to guide Salford through austerity and the £75 million in government cuts to council services which we face over the next three years."

Stewart welcomed the convictions and praised the work of Salford City Council trading standards officers after a sex slave was discovered in an Eccles cellar. Stewart said: "We believe this girl was brought into the country illegally in 2000 and fell into the clutches of these evil men when she was just 10 years old."

Stewart stepped down before the 2016 mayoral election.

== Personal life ==
He married Merilyn Holding in 1968. They have two sons and a daughter.

Parliament of the United Kingdom
| Preceded by Joan Lestor | Member of Parliament for Eccles; 1997–2010 | Constituency abolished |
Political offices
| New title | Mayor of Salford; 2012–2016 | Succeeded by Paul Dennett |
