= Irlam and Cadishead Academy =

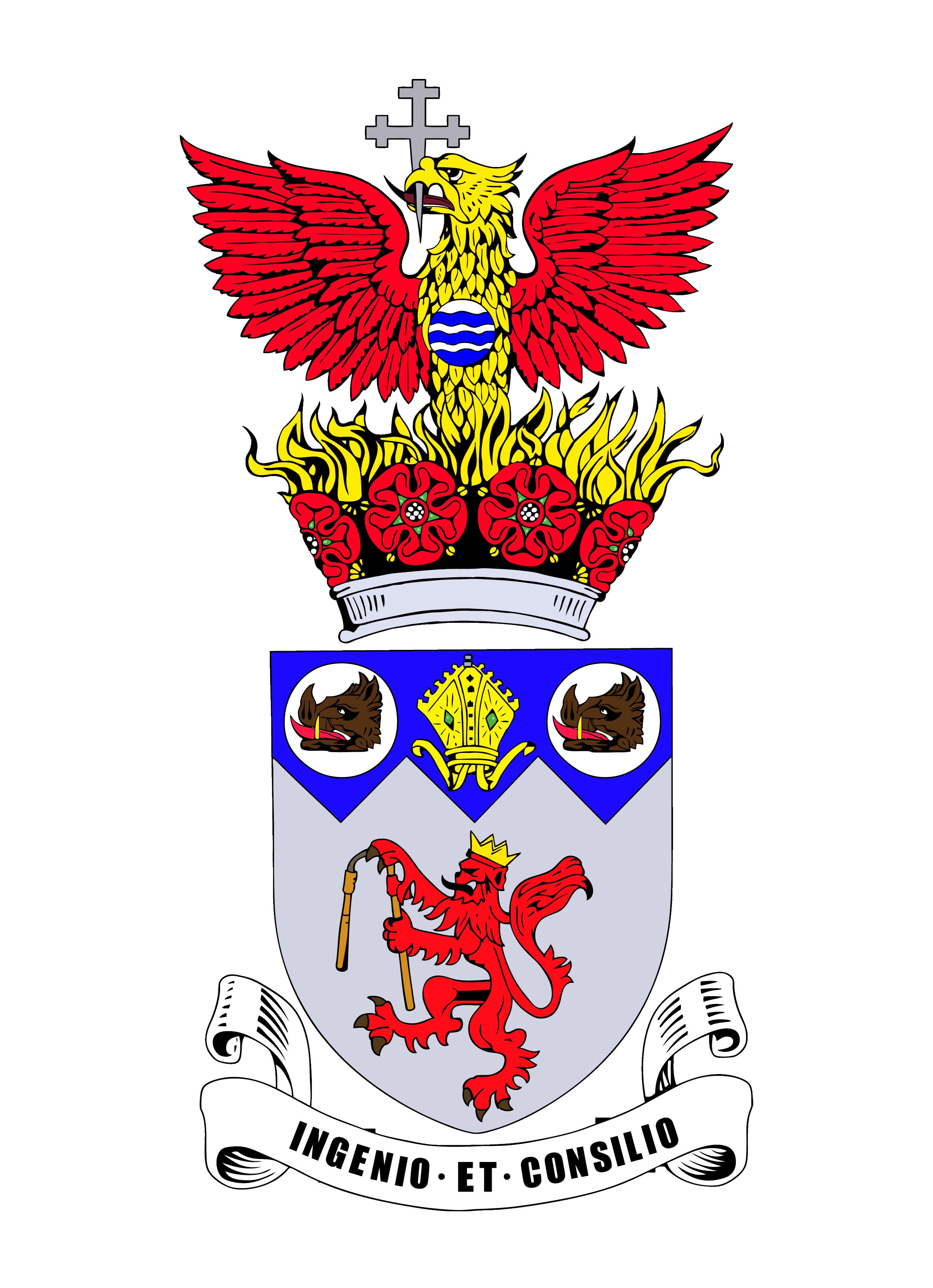

Location
- Station Road; Irlam; Lancashire, M44 5ZR; England; 53.4362°N 2.4302°W

Information
- Type: Academy
- Motto: Ingenio et Consilio (By natural ability and counsel)
- Established: 2019
- Local authority: Salford City Council
- Trust: United Learning
- Department for Education URN: 142073 Tables
- Ofsted: Reports
- Gender: Co-educational
- Age: 11 to 16
- Enrolment: 596
- Colours: Black and Red
- Website: http://www.irlamandcadishead.org.uk

Irlam and Cadishead Academy is a co-educational secondary school located in Irlam at the extreme western end of the City of Salford borough.

== History ==
The school is an amalgamation of several earlier schools.

In 2011, Irlam and Cadishead Community High School closed and several buildings were knocked down. It reopened in June 2011 under a new name; Irlam and Cadishead College, and was formally opened by Bobby Charlton. The pupils and staff moved next door to a new building. It has a variety of learning spaces, outdoor classrooms, a sports hall, gym and a flood-lit all-weather pitch. There is a community centre on the school grounds where the neighbourhood management team along with staff from the health, youth, arts and park ranger services are all based.

In 2015, a new principal was appointed to prepare the school to join the Salford Academy Trust. During this period the sixth form was closed, student numbers fell, many teaching and support staff left and some walls were built to divide up the open plan spaces. By July 2017 the school had become part of the Salford Academy Trust. The trust began winding down in 2018 and all the trust schools were put out to tender for a new trust. On 1 February 2019 the school became part of the United Learning Trust.

Part of the adoption by United Learning was for the college to be renamed to Irlam and Cadishead Academy (ICA). United Learning loaned Executive Principal, Frank McCarron, from their South Manchester cluster of schools to help facilitate change at the ICA.

In 2023, Christopher Leader was instated as the school's headmaster, replacing headmistress Toni Holdsworth. Subsequently, upon a 2024 Ofsted inspection, the school received a 'Good' rating, having previously been deemed 'Requires Improvement' by Ofsted in 2021.

== Notable former pupils ==
- Ian Stewart, 1965
- Russell Watson, 1982
