= Albert Bethel =

Albert Bethel (1 April 1874 – 29 July 1935) was a cotton goods manufacturer and Conservative Party politician in the United Kingdom.

Bethel was born in Banbridge. He was elected as member of parliament (MP) for Eccles at the 1924 general election, but was defeated at the 1929 general election by the Labour Party candidate, David Mort. He did not stand for Parliament again. He died in Fleetwood.

Parliament of the United Kingdom
Preceded by John Buckle	Member of Parliament for Eccles; 1924–1929	Succeeded by David Mort
