= Sir Robert Cary, 1st Baronet =

British politician (1898–1979)

Sir Robert Archibald Cary 1st Baronet

Member of Parliament for Manchester Withington
- In office 25 October 1951 – 8 February 1974
- Preceded by: John Potter
- Succeeded by: William Proctor

Member of Parliament for Eccles
- In office 14 November 1935 – 15 June 1945
- Preceded by: Frederick Cundiff
- Succeeded by: Fred Silvester

Personal details
- Born: 25 May 1898; London, England
- Died: 1 October 1979 (aged 81)
- Spouse: Rosamond Mary Curzon (m. 1924)
- Children: Roger Hugh Cary
- Parent(s): Robert Cary; Alice Day
- Relatives: Artuhur Frederick Johnson (uncle-in-law) and Alice Cary (aunt) William Richard Cary (uncle) Isabella Ann Cary (aunt) and Henry George Shore (uncle-in-law)

Sir Robert Archibald Cary, 1st Baronet (25 May 1898 – 1 October 1979) was a British Conservative politician.

== Early life ==
The son of Robert Cary and Alice Day, he was educated at Ardingly College and at the Royal Military College, Sandhurst. Serving to the 4th/7th Royal Dragoon Guards, Cary fought in the First World War and Second World War.

== Political career ==
From 1939 to 1942, he was Parliamentary Private Secretary to the Civil Lords of the Admiralty, from 1942 to 1945 to the Secretary of State for India and Burma. In 1944 and 1945, he was Assistant Government Whip and Junior Lord of the Treasury between May and July 1945. From 1951 to 1955 he was again Parliamentary Private Secretary, this time to the Lord Privy Seal and Leader of the House of Commons

Cary was Member of Parliament (MP) for Eccles from 1935 to 1945 and for Manchester Withington from 1951 until his retirement at the February 1974 general election. Knighted already in 1945, he was created a baronet, of Withington in the County Palatine of Lancaster on 12 July 1955.

== Family ==
On 30 April 1924, he married Rosamond Mary Scarsdale, daughter of Colonel Alfred Nathaniel Curzon, son of Alfred Nathaniel Holden Curzon, 4th Baron Scarsdale. They had one son, Sir Roger Hugh Cary, 2nd Baronet.

Parliament of the United Kingdom
Preceded by John Potter	Member of Parliament for Eccles; 1935–1945	Succeeded by William Proctor
Preceded by Frederick Cundiff	Member of Parliament for Manchester Withington; 1951–February 1974	Succeeded by Fred Silvester
Baronetage of the United Kingdom
New creation	Baronet (of Withington); 1955–1979	Succeeded by Roger Cary
