= 1890 Eccles by-election =

British parliamentary contest held in 1890

The 1890 Eccles by-election was a parliamentary by-election held for the British House of Commons constituency of Eccles in Lancashire on 22 October 1890.

== Vacancy ==
The by-election was caused by the death of the sitting Conservative MP the Hon. Alfred John Francis Egerton on 25 September 1890. Egerton had held the seat at the 1886 general election with a majority of 292 votes.

== The candidates and constituency ==
The campaign began immediately following the late MP's funeral on 30 September. There were two candidates:

- Algernon Fulke Egerton, a former Conservative MP and uncle of the deceased member, who was also supported by the local Liberal Unionist organisation.
- Henry John Roby, a partner in the firm of Ermen & Roby cotton thread manufacturers, candidate of the Liberal Party.

The constituency was described as containing an "electorate of varied pursuits and interests", with different areas favourable to each candidate. The Liberals were thought to be strong among the factory workers in Patricroft, Pendlebury and Swinton. Roby's family firm maintained two mills in the area, and he was known to be a popular employer. There was also a large number of Irish voters among the employees of the London and North Western Railway locomotive works in Patricroft likely to be in favour of Home Rule. In contrast, the mainly residential town of Eccles was thought to be favourable to the Conservative candidate. The political allegiance of the coal miners of the constituency was uncertain. The Egerton family had been involved in the development and ownership of the collieries, and the Conservatives were confident that this would be sufficient to secure their support. On the other hand, the Liberals, who supported an eight-hour working day, believed they would get the majority of miners' votes.

== The campaign ==
Roby's campaign was bolstered by the support of the Irish National League, with a number of Irish MPs visiting the constituency to support him. The miners' associations applied pressure on Egerton to support an eight hours bill. However he came out in opposition to such a move. The Ashton & Haydock and Manchester Miners' Associations subsequently gave their full support to the Liberals. Following the miners' decision it was clear that the momentum was with the Liberals, and the Conservatives "were beginning to recognise [that Egerton's] name and influence will avail them little".

== Polling day ==
Polling opened at 8 a.m., with both parties organising transport for their supporters. Rosettes in party colours were widely worn: blue for the Conservatives and red for the Liberals. The Liberals were fearful of personation and employed a large number of scrutineers at the eleven polling stations. Polling was relatively slow until lunch time, when large numbers of navvies and mill-operators voted. There was a heavy poll from 5 p.m. until the close of polls at 8 p.m.

== Result ==
The votes were counted at Eccles Town Hall, and the result was a gain for the Liberals. This was seen as setback for the Unionist government of Lord Salisbury and a rejection of their Irish policy.

Eccles by-election 1890
Party	Candidate	Votes	%	±%
Liberal	Henry John Roby	4,901	51.1	+2.9
Conservative	Hon. Algernon Egerton	4,696	48.9	−2.9
Majority		205	2.2	N/A
Turnout		9,597	86.2	+1.7
Liberal gain from Conservative		Swing	+2.9	
