= John Buckle =

British politician

John Buckle (1867 – 8 November 1925) was a British trade unionist and Labour Party politician.

== Biography ==
Buckle was an official in the National Union of Boot and Shoe Operatives, and was the first Labour alderman on Leeds City Council. In 1908 he was one of three members of the union who were nominated as parliamentary candidates. In the event he did not in fact contest an election until 1922. By 1915 he had become president of the Shoe and Boot Operatives.

By 1919 he had moved to Leicester. In that year he was appointed by the Minister of Labour to the Trade Board for the Shoe and Boot Repairing Trade as a workers' representative. In 1922 he was the travelling organiser for his union and the society's principal negotiator.

In the general election of 1922 he was elected to the Commons as Member of Parliament for the Eccles Division of Lancashire, unseating the Conservative incumbent, Marshall Stevens. He held the seat when a further election was held in 1923. Although his total number of votes fell from 14,354 to 12,227 he was able to increase his majority over Stevens from 1,803 to 1,863 with the anti-Labour vote split by the presence of a Liberal Party candidate. A minority Labour government that was formed following the election collapsed in October 1924, necessitating a further general election. Although he managed to increase his vote, Buckle was defeated in a straight fight by the Conservative candidate Albert Bethel by over 2,000 votes. He died in the following year.

Parliament of the United Kingdom
Preceded by Marshall Stevens	Member of Parliament for Eccles; 1922–1924	Succeeded by Albert Bethel
