= Mayor of Salford =

Directly elected politician

- Coat of arms of the City of Salford

- Incumbent; Paul Dennett since 6 May 2016
- Style: No courtesy title or style
- Appointer: Electorate of Salford
- Term length: Four years
- Inaugural holder: Ian Stewart
- Formation: 2012
- Website: citymayor.salford.gov.uk

The Mayor of Salford is a directly elected local authority mayor responsible for the executive functions of Salford City Council, created in 2012 for the City of Salford in Greater Manchester. The position is different from the long-existing and largely ceremonial, annually appointed ceremonial mayor of Salford.

== Greater Manchester Combined Authority ==
The GMCA is made up of 11 constituent members: the elected Mayor of Greater Manchester and the 10 leaders, nominated by each of Greater Manchester's constituent authorities. The Mayor of Salford is the only directly elected council leader in Greater Manchester.

== Referendum ==
A petition of 10,500 Salford residents, started by the English Democrats, on a referendum on the creation of a directly elected mayor triggered the process of establishing a directly elected mayor for Salford. The poll was held on 26 January 2012.

Mayor of Salford referendum 26 January 2012
Choice	Votes	%
Elected Mayor	17,344	55.95
Cabinet System	13,653	44.05
Total	30,997	100.00
Valid votes	30,997	99.70
Invalid/blank votes	94	0.30
Total votes	31,091	100.00
Registered voters/turnout	171,790	18.10
Source: Salford City Council

== Elections ==
=== 2012 ===
In the first election for a directly elected mayor in May 2012, Ian Stewart, a Labour Party politician who was the Member of Parliament (MP) for Eccles from 1997 until 2010, was elected. During the campaign controversy surrounded Independent candidate Paul Massey who stated that he is not a criminal, after he was arrested in connection with allegations of money laundering.

Salford Mayoral Election 3 May 2012
Party	Candidate	1st round		2nd round			1st round votesTransfer votes, 2nd round
Party	Candidate	Total	Of round	Transfers	Total	Of round	1st round votesTransfer votes, 2nd round
Labour	Ian Stewart	20,663	46.0%	2,796	23,459	70.0%	
Conservative	Karen Garrido	8,055	18.0%	2,016	10,071	30.0%	
UKIP	Bernard Gill	3,368	7.5%				
Independent	Pat Ward	2,665	5.9%				
Liberal Democrats	Norman Owen	2,148	4.8%				
BNP	Edward O'Sullivan	2,026	4.5%				
Independent	Paul Massey	1,995	4.5%				
English Democrat	Michael Felse	1,616	3.6%				
Green	Joseph O'Neill	1,273	2.8%				
Community Action	Michael Moulding	1,065	2.4%				
Labour win							

=== 2016 ===
Salford Mayoral Election 5 May 2016
Party	Candidate	1st round		2nd round			1st round votesTransfer votes, 2nd round
Party	Candidate	Total	Of round	Transfers	Total	Of round	1st round votesTransfer votes, 2nd round
Labour	Paul Dennett	24,209	49.6%	4,123	28,332	66.2%	
Conservative	Robin Garrido	11,810	24.2%	2,674	14,484	33.8%	
UKIP	Owen Hammond	8,668	17.7%				
Green	Wendy Olsen	4,158	8.5%				
Labour hold							

=== 2021 ===
The election was scheduled to take place in May 2020 but was delayed to 6 May 2021 due to COVID-19 pandemic, it took place alongside other local and regional elections in the United Kingdom.

Salford Mayoral Election 6 May 2021
Party	Candidate	1st round		2nd round			1st round votesTransfer votes, 2nd round
Party	Candidate	Total	Of round	Transfers	Total	Of round	1st round votesTransfer votes, 2nd round
Labour	Paul Dennett	30,892	59.0%				
Conservative	Arnie Saunders	12,234	23.4%				
Green	Wendy Olsen	4,585	8.8%				
Independent	Stephen Ord	1,890	3.6%				
Liberal Democrats	Jake Overend	1,716	3.3%				
Independent	Stuart Cremins	1,036	2.0%				
Turnout		53,509	28.76%				
Labour hold							

=== 2024 ===
The 2024 Salford mayoral election was held on 2 May 2024, alongside the 2024 Salford City Council elections, the 2024 Greater Manchester mayoral election and other local elections across England and Wales.

This election was the first to use first-past-the-post to elect the mayor as a result of changes made to electoral law by the Elections Act 2022. The candidates were announced on the same day that the candidates for the local elections were made known.

Salford Mayoral Election 2 May 2024
Party	Candidate	Votes	%	±%
Labour	Paul Dennett	30,753	61.5%	+2.5%
Conservative	Jillian Collinson	10,930	21.9%	−1.5%
Green	David Jones	5,623	11.2%	+2.4%
TUSC	Sally Griffiths	2,681	5.4%	N/A
Rejected ballots		690		
Majority		19,823	39.6%	+4.0%
Turnout		49,987	25.9%	−2.9%
Registered electors		193,084		
Labour hold		Swing	+2.0%	

== List of mayors ==
Political party	Name	Entered office	Left office
Labour	Ian Stewart	May 2012	May 2016
Labour	Paul Dennett	May 2016	Incumbent
