= Marshall Stevens =

British politician (1852–1936)

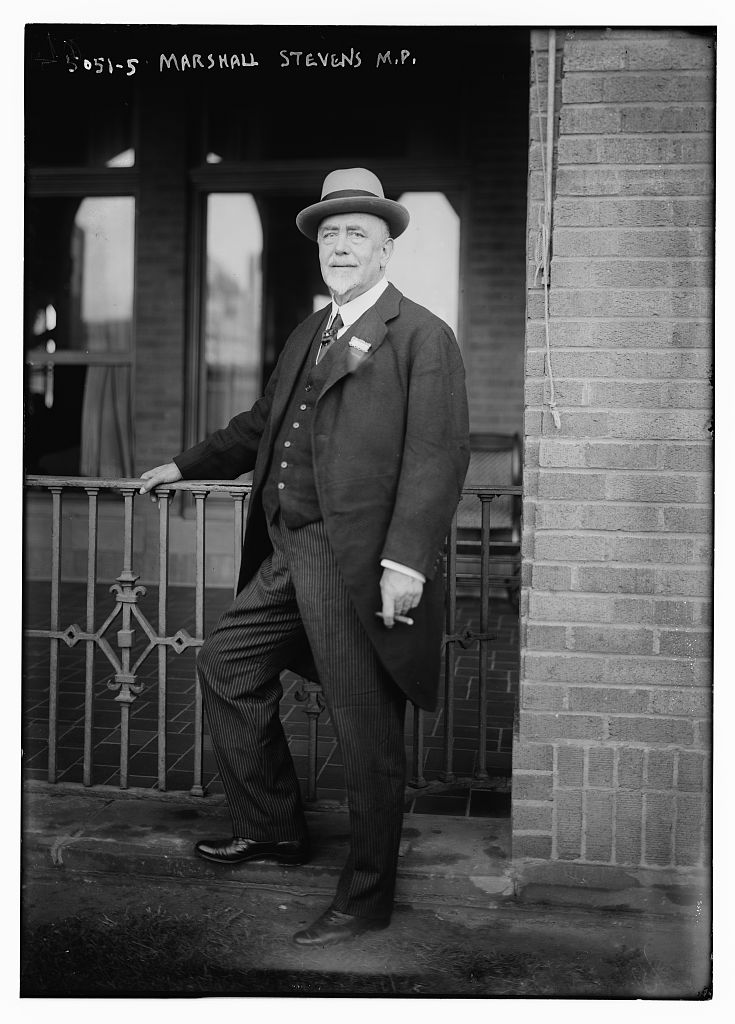
- Stevens in 1919

Member of Parliament for Eccles
- In office 14 December 1918 – 26 October 1922
- Preceded by: George Pollard
- Succeeded by: John Buckle

Personal details
- Born: 18 April 1852 Plymouth, England
- Died: 12 August 1936 (aged 84) Devonport, England
- Party: Conservative
- Spouse: Louisa Blamey
- Parent(s): Sanders Stevens and Emma Ruth Marshall
- Occupation: Property developer

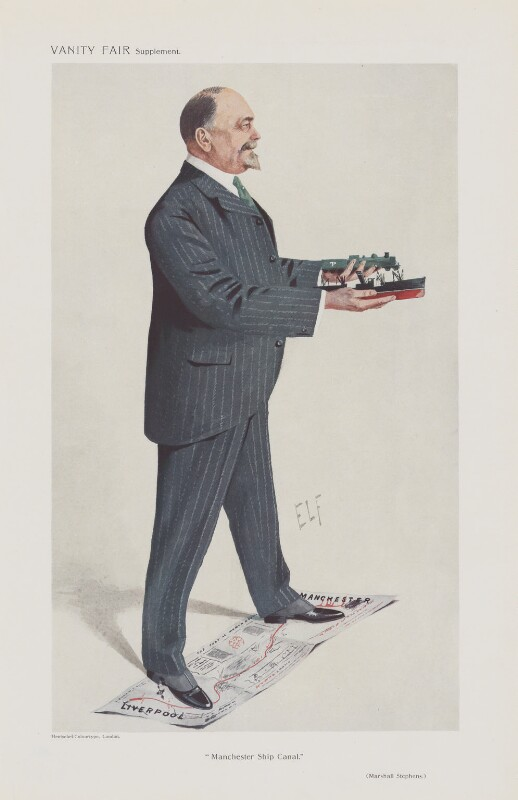
"Manchester Ship Canal", caricature by Elf in Vanity Fair, 1910.

Marshall Stevens (18 April 1852 – 12 August 1936) was an English property developer. His work with Daniel Adamson and others led to the construction of the Manchester Ship Canal, completed in 1894.

== Biography ==
Stevens was born on 18 April 1852 in Plymouth, England, the eldest child of four sons and two daughters of shipowner and coal merchant Sanders Stevens (1826 – 1910) and Emma Ruth (1832 – 1899; née Marshall).

He was appointed general manager of the Ship Canal Company in 1891. On 1 January 1897, Stevens resigned from the canal company to become general manager of Trafford Park Estates, a company set up by Ernest Terah Hooley to develop Trafford Park, the ancestral home of the de Trafford family, into what became the first and largest planned industrial estate in the world. He also served as Conservative Member of Parliament for Eccles from 1918 to 1922.

Stevens died on 12 August 1936 in Devonport, Devon and was buried in St Catherine Church, Barton-upon-Irwell. Shareholders in Trafford Park Estates subscribed to pay for a memorial.

== Legacy ==
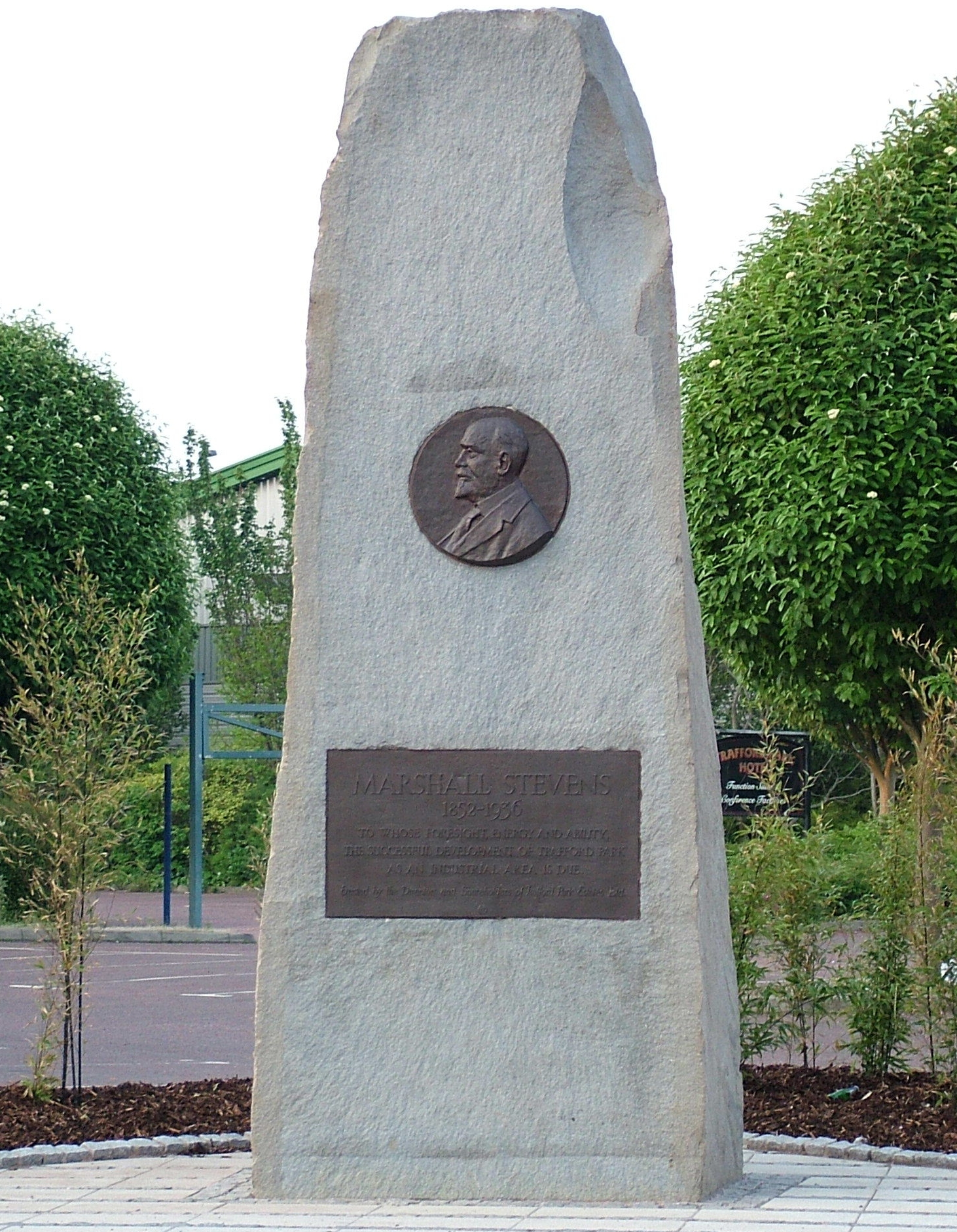
Memorial to Marshall Stevens

A 22-ton block of Welsh granite with a bronze portrait medallion and inscription was designed and made by Ashton upon Mersey sculptor, Arthur Sherwood Edwards. It was unveiled at the junction of Trafford Park Road and Ashburton Road in October 1937.

In 1993, the memorial was relocated to Wharfside Promenade with the introduction of a new road layout. As the site became part of Imperial War Museum North, the memorial was put into temporary storage when construction work began on the museum. It is now in Trafford Park Village at the junction of Third Avenue and Eleventh Street.

The memorial is inscribed:

Marshall Stevens
1852–1936
To whose foresight, energy and ability
the successful development of Trafford Park
as an industrial area is due.

Parliament of the United Kingdom
Preceded by Sir George Herbert Pollard	Member of Parliament for Eccles; 1918–1922	Succeeded by John Buckle
