= George Pollard (politician) =

British politician (1864–1937)

George Pollard

Sir George Herbert Pollard (20 October 1864 – 27 August 1937) was a British physician, barrister and Liberal politician.

He was the son of James Pollard of Southport, Lancashire.

Pollard was educated at Oxford and Edinburgh Universities. He received a Bachelor of Medicine degree from the Royal College of Surgeons of Edinburgh in 1886, and was the first prizeman in Public Health.

In 1888 he married Charlotte Elizabeth Butterworth. He was called to the bar at the Inner Temple in 1893, and was elected mayor of the Borough of Southport in 1897.

He was an active participant in Liberal politics, and stood unsuccessfully for election to parliament at Southport in 1892, and Chatham in 1895. In 1906 he was elected MP for Eccles, and held the seat until the 1918 general election.

He was a member of the General Council of University of Edinburgh and assistant to the Professor of Midwifery at the Royal College of Surgeons, Edinburgh. During the First World War he was a medical advisor to the Ministry of Munitions on poison gas and chemical warfare. In 1909 he was knighted.

Parliament of the United Kingdom
Preceded by Octavius Leigh Leigh-Clare	Member of Parliament for Eccles; 1906–1918	Succeeded by Marshall Stevens
