= Joan Lestor =

British politician (1927-1998)

The Right Honourable The Baroness Lestor of Eccles

Shadow Minister for Overseas Development
- In office 20 October 1994 – 25 July 1996
- Leader: Tony Blair
- Preceded by: Tom Clarke
- Succeeded by: Clare Short

Shadow Spokesperson for Children and Families
- In office 2 November 1989 – 20 October 1994
- Leader: Neil Kinnock; John Smith

Chair of the Labour Party
- In office 7 October 1977 – 6 October 1978
- Leader: James Callaghan
- Preceded by: John Chalmers
- Succeeded by: Frank Allaun

Member of Parliament for Eccles
- In office 11 June 1987 – 8 April 1997
- Preceded by: Lewis Carter-Jones
- Succeeded by: Ian Stewart

Member of Parliament for Eton and Slough
- In office 31 March 1966 – 13 May 1983
- Preceded by: Anthony Meyer
- Succeeded by: Constituency abolished John Watts (as MP for Slough)

Personal details
- Born: 13 November 1927 Vancouver, British Columbia, Canada
- Died: 27 March 1998 (aged 70) London, England
- Party: Labour
- Other political affiliations: Socialist Party
- Education: University of London

Joan Lestor, Baroness Lestor of Eccles (13 November 1927 (Note: Some contemporary news sources report as 1931.) – 27 March 1998) was a British Labour Party politician. She was Member of Parliament (MP) for Eton and Slough from the 1966 general election until her defeat in 1983, and MP for Eccles from the 1987 general election until her retirement in 1997.

== Early life ==
Lestor was born in Vancouver, British Columbia, Canada, in 1927. She grew up in the United Kingdom from the age of five. She was educated at Blaenavon Secondary School, Monmouth; William Morris High School, Walthamstow and the University of London. She became a nursery school teacher and a member of the Socialist Party of Great Britain, but resigned from the latter over the Turner Controversy. She became a councillor in 1958 on the Metropolitan Borough of Wandsworth and later the London Borough of Wandsworth. She served on London County Council, losing in Lewisham West at the 1961 election, but winning a by-election to represent Wandsworth Central from 1962 until 1964.

== Parliamentary career ==
Lestor contested Lewisham West in 1964 and was elected member of parliament for Eton and Slough in 1966.

She was briefly a junior minister from 1969 to 1970 with responsibility for nursery education. In March 1974 she became the Under-Secretary of State for Foreign and Commonwealth Affairs and in June 1975 moved back to Education as Under-Secretary of State, for Education and Science. In March 1976 she resigned over cuts.

Lestor was one of the founding editors of anti-fascist monthly, Searchlight, though that magazine had only a tenuous connection to the current publication.

After boundary changes in 1983, Lestor contested the new constituency of Slough but was defeated by the Conservative candidate John Watts. Neil Kinnock, who became leader of the Labour Party shortly after the election said he was "heartbroken" by Lestor's defeat. Lestor blamed the SDP for her defeat. No longer an MP, Lestor worked for the World Development Movement, campaigning for child welfare and setting up a unit to investigate child abuse, including sexual abuse, an area neglected by mainstream politicians at the time.

She was returned for Eccles in 1987, and held this seat until 1997. She served in the shadow cabinet between 1989 and 1996 firstly as Shadow Spokesperson for Children and Families and subsequently as Shadow Minister for Overseas Development. She resigned on 25 July 1996 after announcing that she was not seeking re-election at the next election.

== House of Lords ==
On 4 June 1997, Lestor was created a life peer as Baroness Lestor of Eccles, of Tooting Bec in the London Borough of Wandsworth.

== Personal life and death ==
In 1952, Lestor married David McGregor, but they divorced soon afterwards. In the late 1960s, Lestor adopted two children. She died from motor neuron disease at the Royal Trinity Hospice in London on 27 March 1998.

== Notes ==
Parliament of the United Kingdom
Preceded by Anthony Meyer	Member of Parliament for Eton and Slough; 1966–1983	Constituency abolished
Preceded by Lewis Carter-Jones	Member of Parliament for Eccles; 1987–1997	Succeeded by Ian Stewart
Party political offices
Preceded by John Chalmers	Chair of the Labour Party; 1977–1978	Succeeded by Frank Allaun
