= Paul Dennett =

British politician

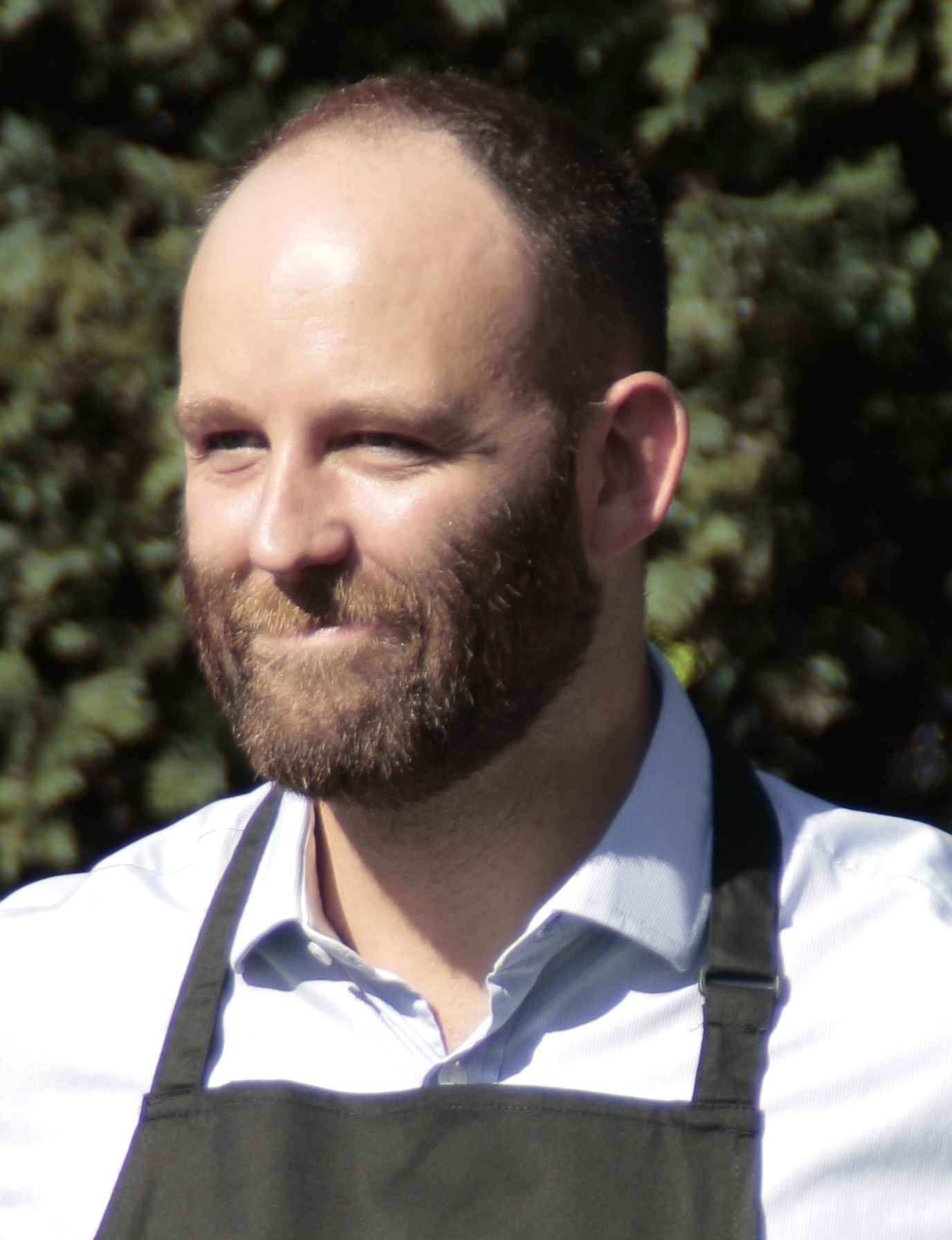
- Dennett in 2016

Deputy Mayor of Greater Manchester
- Incumbent
- Assumed office 8 December 2021
- Mayor: Andy Burnham; Himself (acting); Bev Craig
- Preceded by: Richard Leese

Mayor of Salford
- Incumbent
- Assumed office 9 May 2016
- Preceded by: Ian Stewart

Acting Mayor of Greater Manchester
- In office 19 June 2026 – 3 August 2026
- Deputy: Himself
- Preceded by: Andy Burnham
- Succeeded by: Bev Craig

Member of Salford City Council for Langworthy
- In office 3 May 2012 – 6 May 2016
- Preceded by: Lynn Drake
- Succeeded by: Paul Longshaw

Personal details
- Born: Warrington, Cheshire, England
- Party: Labour
- Education: Great Sankey High School; University of Ulster (BA); University of Manchester (MSc); Manchester Metropolitan University (MRes)

Paul Dennett is a British politician serving as deputy mayor of Greater Manchester since 2021. A member of the Labour Party, he has served as Mayor of Salford since 2016 and was the acting mayor of Greater Manchester from June 2026 to August 2026.

== Early life ==
Dennett was born in Warrington and grew up working class. He is openly gay. Dennett's father worked for a power station and was an active trade unionist and his mother was a housewife and house cleaner. His parents would later run The Engine Pub in Prescot, Merseyside. He attended Park Road Primary School and Great Sankey High School, before working in customer services at a BT call centre.

He received a BA in International Business from the University of Ulster, an MSc in Human Resource Management and Industrial Relations from the Manchester Business School, and an MRES in Social Sciences from Manchester Metropolitan University. While at university, Dennett worked as an HR adviser and as a lecturer at Manchester Metropolitan University Business School.

== Career ==
Dennett joined the Labour Party in 2007. He was elected the Mayor of Salford on 5 May 2016, succeeding Ian Stewart also of the Labour Party, and was re-elected in 2021.

As the Mayor of Salford he is also a member of the Greater Manchester Combined Authority. He is the GMCA's portfolio lead for Healthy Lives and Homelessness, and since December 2021 is the Deputy Mayor of Greater Manchester. He served as acting Mayor of Greater Manchester from 19 June 2026 following Andy Burnham's election as MP for Makerfield, until Burnham's permanent successor Bev Craig was sworn in on 3 August 2026.

Dennett was formerly a local councillor for the Langworthy ward in Salford, and is a member of the Unite and UCU trade unions.

Political offices
Preceded by Ian Stewart	Mayor of Salford; 2016–present	Incumbent
Preceded by Richard Leese	Deputy Mayor of Greater Manchester; 2021–present	Incumbent
Preceded by Andy Burnham	Mayor of Greater Manchester; Acting; 2026	Succeeded by Bev Craig
