= Barbara Keeley =

British politician (born 1952)

The Right Honourable The Baroness Keeley
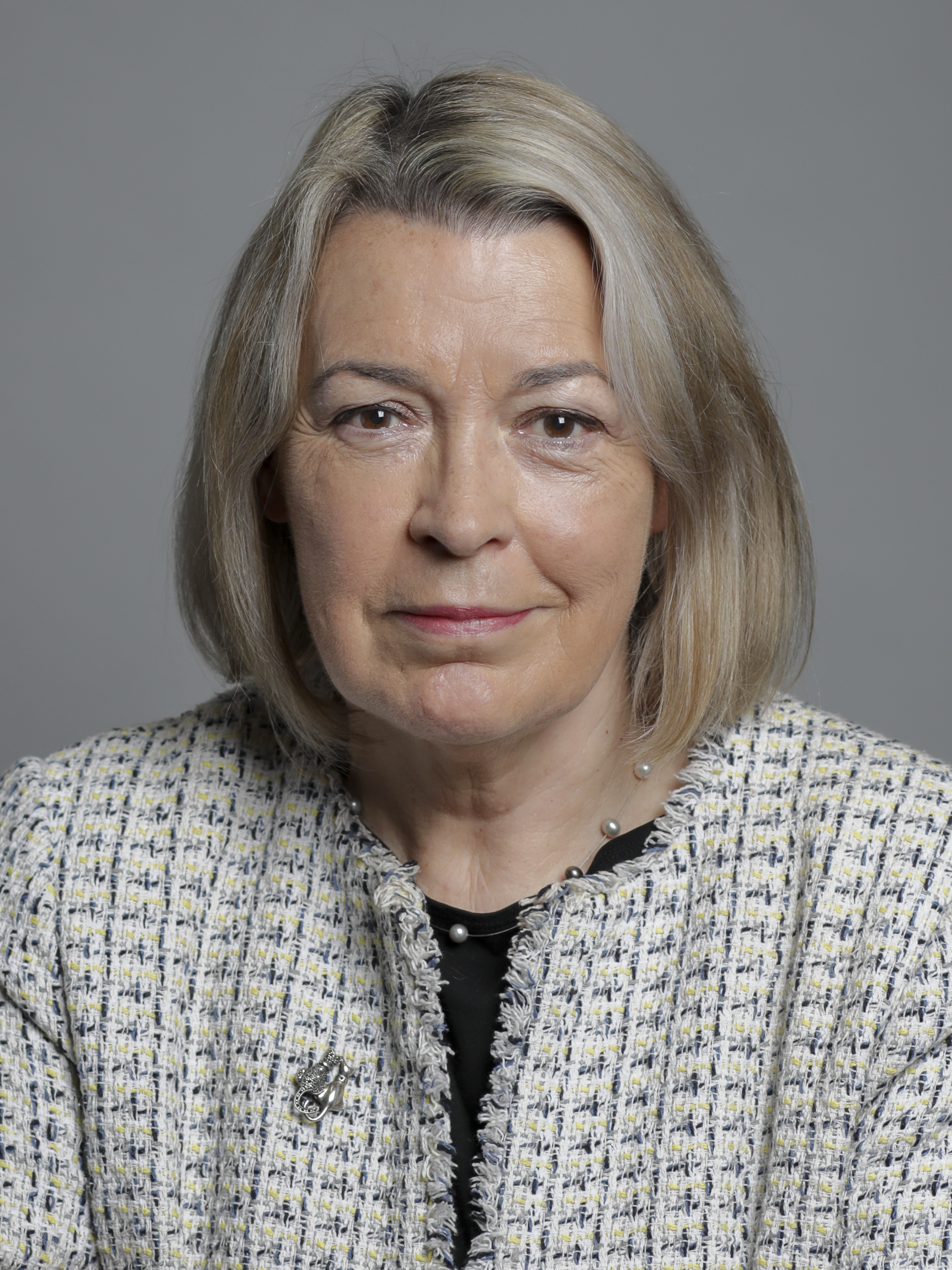
- Official portrait, 2020

Deputy Leader of the House of Commons
- In office 9 June 2009 – 11 May 2010
- Prime Minister: Gordon Brown
- Preceded by: Chris Bryant
- Succeeded by: David Heath
Shadow portfolios
Shadow Cabinet
| 2016–2020 | Mental Health and Social Care |
Shadow Frontbench
| 2023–2024 | Music and Tourism |
| 2022–2023 | Arts and Civil Society |
| 2015–2016 | Older People, Social Care and Carers |
| 2010 | Commons Deputy Leader |

Member of the House of Lords
- Lord Temporal
- Life peerage 13 August 2024

Member of Parliament for Worsley and Eccles South Worsley (2005–2010)
- In office 5 May 2005 – 30 May 2024
- Preceded by: Terry Lewis
- Succeeded by: Constituency abolished

Member of Trafford Council for Priory
- In office 4 May 1995 – 10 June 2004
- Preceded by: Edna Mitchell

Personal details
- Born: Barbara Mary Keeley; 26 March 1952 (age 74)
- Party: Labour
- Spouse: Colin Huggett
- Education: University of Salford (BA)
- Website: Barbara Keeley (archived February 2025)

Barbara Mary Keeley, Baroness Keeley (born 26 March 1952), is a British Labour Party politician. She served as Member of Parliament (MP) for Worsley and Eccles South, previously Worsley, from 2005 to 2024, and has been a member of the House of Lords since 2024.

A member of the Labour Party, she served as Shadow Minister for Music and Tourism from 2023 to 2024. She previously served as Deputy Leader of the House of Commons from 2009 to 2010 and served in Jeremy Corbyn's shadow cabinet as Shadow Minister for Mental Health and Social Care from 2016 to 2020.

== Early life and career ==
Barbara Mary Keeley was born on 26 March 1952 to Edward and Joan Keeley. She was educated at Mount St Mary's College in Leeds and the University of Salford, gaining a Bachelor of Arts (BA) degree in politics and contemporary history.

Her early career was with IBM, first as a systems engineer and then a field systems engineering manager. Later she became an independent consultant, working on community regeneration issues across North West England.

Keeley was elected as a Labour councillor on Trafford Council in 1995 for the ward of Priory, serving until 2004. On the council, she was a cabinet member for children and young people, early years and childcare and health and wellbeing. From 2002 to 2004, she was the cabinet member for education, children's social services and all services for children and young people, and the director of a Pathfinder Children's Trust. She is a member of the GMB Union, the Co-operative Party and the Fabian Society.

From 2002 to 2005, Keeley worked as a consultant to the charity the Princess Royal Trust for Carers, researching carers' issues — particularly those related to primary health care. She is co-author of the reports Carers Speak Out and Primary Carers.

== Parliamentary career ==
In the House of Commons, Keeley served as a member of the Constitutional Affairs Select committee and from February 2006, the Finance and Services Committee. On 8 February 2006, she was appointed as Parliamentary private secretary (PPS) to the Cabinet Office, working with the Cabinet Office Minister, Jim Murphy MP. In June 2006, she moved to be PPS to Jim Murphy as Minister of State at the Department for Work and Pensions.

On 16 December 2006, she won the nomination to be the Labour Party candidate for the constituency of Worsley and Eccles South, following boundary changes affecting Worsley.

In 2007, she served as the Parliamentary Champion for Carers Week (11–17 June). She introduced a Private member's bill — The Carers (Identification and Support) Bill — into the House of Commons on 24 April that year. The Bill would have required health bodies to identify patients who are carers or who have a carer and would make provision in relation to the responsibilities of local authorities and schools for the needs of young carers.

In June 2007, Keeley was appointed as PPS to Harriet Harman as Secretary of State for Women and Equality and appointed by Gordon Brown to chair the Labour Party's manifesto group on Social Care. In October 2008 she became an Assistant Government Whip, and in June 2009 was promoted to Deputy Leader of the House of Commons. In June 2010, she was appointed as a member of the Shadow Health Team and as the Shadow Deputy Leader of the House.

She stood in the 2010 Shadow Cabinet election, coming 23rd. She was shadow minister for the Department of Communities and Local Government until October 2011.

Keeley endorsed Andy Burnham in the 2015 Labour leadership election, which was subsequently won by Jeremy Corbyn, who appointed her in September 2015 as Shadow Minister for Older People, Social Care and Carers.

In June 2016, Keeley was among the dozens of shadow ministers who resigned from Corbyn's frontbench team following the EU referendum. She subsequently supported Owen Smith in the 2016 Labour leadership election. Following Corbyn's re-election as Labour leader in October 2016, Keeley was appointed to the Shadow Cabinet as Shadow Minister for Mental Health and Social Care.

Following Labour's defeat in the 2019 general election, Keeley endorsed Keir Starmer and Angela Rayner in the 2020 Labour leadership and deputy leadership elections. When Starmer was elected Labour leader in April 2020, Keeley left the Shadow Cabinet and returned to the backbenches.

Keeley rejoined the frontbench in March 2022 when she was appointed Shadow Minister for Arts and Civil Society, replacing Rachael Maskell, who resigned 3 months prior following her opposition to mandatory COVID-19 vaccinations for NHS staff.

In the 2023 British shadow cabinet reshuffle she was appointed Shadow Minister for Music and Tourism.

On 27 May 2024, Keeley announced she would not stand in the 2024 general election. She revealed that she had received hospital treatment and would retire after serving as an MP for 19 years.

=== Peerage ===
After standing down as an MP, Keeley was nominated for a life peerage in the 2024 Dissolution Honours. She was created Baroness Keeley, of Worsley in the City of Salford, on 13 August 2024.

== Views ==
In 2018, Keeley expressed concern about a fall in the number of psychiatrists treating children and young people in England.

In November 2018, Keeley criticised poor standards of care in many private care homes after an investigation by The Guardian found that elderly residents were being neglected. She stated, "This investigation has exposed the appalling standards of care being provided by some of the largest providers of outsourced residential care which has left large numbers of vulnerable people in need of care suffering terrible indignity and neglect."

In December 2018, Keeley expressed concern about care workers having their wages docked when they are sick. She said: "Good care quality depends on workers with good terms and conditions, but in hollowing out our social care system through relentless cuts to council budgets, this government has empowered irresponsible providers that are driving down workers’ conditions and at the same time damaging the quality of care."

== Personal life ==
Keeley is married to Colin Huggett.

Parliament of the United Kingdom
| Preceded by Terry Lewis | Member of Parliament for Worsley; 2005–2010 | Constituency abolished |
| New constituency | Member of Parliament for Worsley and Eccles South; 2010–2024 | Constituency abolished |
