= Worsley (constituency) =

UK Parliament constituency (1983–2010)

Coordinates: 53°31′N 2°25′W

- Former county constituency for the House of Commons
- Boundary of Worsley in Greater Manchester for the 2005 general election

- Location of Greater Manchester within England
- County: Greater Manchester

1983–2010
- Seats: One
- Created from: Leigh; Newton; Farnworth
- Replaced by: Worsley and Eccles South; Leigh

Worsley was a parliamentary constituency represented in the House of Commons of the Parliament of the United Kingdom. It elected one Member of Parliament (MP) by the first past the post system of election.

== Boundaries ==
1983–1997: The City of Salford wards of Cadishead, Irlam, Little Hulton, Walkden North, Walkden South, and Worsley and Boothstown, and the Metropolitan Borough of Wigan wards of Bedford-Astley and Tyldesley East.

1997–2010: The City of Salford wards of Little Hulton, Walkden North, Walkden South, and Worsley and Boothstown, and the Metropolitan Borough of Wigan wards of Bedford-Astley, Hindsford, and Tyldesley East.

The constituency was created in 1983 from parts of the seats of Leigh, Newton and Farnworth. This was a safe Labour seat including mostly working-class areas from the boroughs of Salford and Wigan, including Walkden, Little Hulton, Astley and Irlam. The only Tory areas of strength here ironically were Worsley itself and Boothstown.

=== Boundary review ===
Following its review of parliamentary representation in Greater Manchester, the Boundary Commission for England recommended that Worsley be merged into a new constituency of Worsley and Eccles South. That constituency was first fought at the 2010 general election.

The previous link between Salford and Wigan for parliamentary purposes has been broken, hence the requirement to alter the existing Worsley seat. The Wigan Borough wards were returned to the Leigh constituency.

== Members of Parliament ==
Election	Member	Party
1983	Terry Lewis	Labour
2005	Barbara Keeley	Labour
2010	constituency abolished: see Worsley and Eccles South	

== Elections ==
=== Elections in the 1980s ===
General election 1983: Worsley
Party	Candidate	Votes	%	±%
Labour	Terry Lewis	21,675	40.3	
Conservative	Stanley Windle	17,536	32.6	
SDP	John Roper	14,545	27.1	
Majority		4,139	7.7	
Turnout		53,756	74.7	
Labour win (new seat)				

General election 1987: Worsley
Party	Candidate	Votes	%	±%
Labour	Terry Lewis	27,157	48.1	+7.8
Conservative	Veronica Horman	19,820	35.1	+2.5
Liberal	David Cowpe	9,507	16.8	−10.3
Majority		7,337	13.0	+5.3
Turnout		56,484	77.2	+2.5
Labour hold		Swing	+2.7	

=== Elections in the 1990s ===
General election 1992: Worsley
Party	Candidate	Votes	%	±%
Labour	Terry Lewis	29,418	52.4	+4.3
Conservative	Neil St. C. Cameron	19,406	34.6	−0.5
Liberal Democrats	Robert D. Boyd	6,490	11.6	−5.2
Green	Philip J. Connolly	677	1.2	New
Natural Law	Gregg D. Phillips	176	0.3	New
Majority		10,012	17.8	+4.8
Turnout		56,167	77.7	+0.5
Labour hold		Swing	+2.4	

General election 1997: Worsley
Party	Candidate	Votes	%	±%
Labour	Terry Lewis	29,083	62.2	+9.8
Conservative	Damien R.L. Garrido	11,342	24.2	−10.4
Liberal Democrats	Robert Bleakley	6,356	13.6	+2.0
Majority		17,741	38.0	+20.2
Turnout		46,781	67.8	−9.9
Labour hold		Swing		

=== Elections in the 2000s ===
General election 2001: Worsley
Party	Candidate	Votes	%	±%
Labour	Terry Lewis	20,193	57.1	−5.1
Conservative	Tobias Ellwood	8,406	23.8	−0.4
Liberal Democrats	Robert Bleakley	6,188	17.5	+3.9
Socialist Labour	Dorothy Entwistle	576	1.6	New
Majority		11,787	33.3	−4.7
Turnout		35,363	51.0	−16.8
Labour hold		Swing		

General election 2005: Worsley
Party	Candidate	Votes	%	±%
Labour	Barbara Keeley	18,859	51.0	−6.1
Conservative	Graham Evans	9,491	25.7	+1.9
Liberal Democrats	Richard M. Clayton	6,902	18.7	+1.2
UKIP	Bernard Gill	1,694	4.6	New
Majority		9,368	25.4	−7.9
Turnout		36,946	53.1	+2.1
Labour hold		Swing	−4.0	

== See also ==
- List of parliamentary constituencies in Greater Manchester
