= Eccles (constituency) =

Parliamentary constituency in the United Kingdom, 1885–2010

Coordinates: 53°29′N 2°20′W

- Former borough constituency for the House of Commons
- Boundary of Eccles in Greater Manchester for the 2005 general election

- Location of Greater Manchester within England
- County: Greater Manchester

1885–2010
- Seats: One
- Created from: South East Lancashire
- Replaced by: Salford and Eccles, Worsley and Eccles South

Eccles was a parliamentary constituency of the United Kingdom, centred on the town of Eccles in Greater Manchester, England. It returned one Member of Parliament (MP) to the House of Commons of the Parliament of the United Kingdom, elected by the first past the post system.

== History ==
The constituency was established under the Redistribution of Seats Act 1885 for the 1885 general election, and abolished at the 2010 general election.

== Boundaries ==
Eccles in Lancashire, boundaries used 1974–1983

=== 1885–1918 ===
The constituency, known as South East Lancashire, Eccles Division, was defined as consisting of the civil parishes of Barton upon Irwell, Clifton, Flixton, Urmston, Worsley and the part of the parish of Pendlebury not in the Parliamentary Borough of Salford.

=== 1918–1983 ===
The Representation of the People Act 1918 redrew all constituencies in Great Britain and Ireland. The Parliamentary Borough of Eccles consisted of two local government districts: the Municipal Borough of Eccles and the Urban District of Swinton and Pendlebury (later incorporated as a borough). The seat was renamed Eccles Borough Constituency by the Representation of the People Act 1948.

=== 1983–1997 ===
In 1983 constituency boundaries were altered to align with the new administrative geography introduced by the Local Government Act 1972. Eccles became a borough constituency in the parliamentary county of Greater Manchester, consisting of seven wards of the City of Salford: Barton, Eccles, Pendlebury, Swinton North, Swinton South, Weaste and Seedley, and Winton.

=== 1997–2010 ===
The boundaries of the constituency were altered for 1997 general election, reflecting a change in ward boundaries. It was defined as consisting of the following wards: Barton, Cadishead, Eccles, Irlam, Pendlebury, Swinton North, Swinton South and Winton.

=== Abolition ===
Following its review of parliamentary representation in Greater Manchester, the Boundary Commission for England recommended that Eccles be split between two new constituencies:

- Salford and Eccles, from the existing Salford constituency and the central/eastern part of Eccles.
- Worsley and Eccles South, from the existing Worsley constituency and the southern/western part of Eccles.

These constituencies were used from the 2010 general election.

== Members of Parliament ==
| Election | Member | Party |
|---|---|---|
| 1885 | Alfred Egerton | Conservative |
| 1890 by-election | Henry Roby | Liberal |
| 1895 | Octavius Leigh-Clare | Conservative |
| 1906 | Sir George Pollard | Liberal |
| 1918 | Marshall Stevens | Coalition Conservative |
| 1922 | John Buckle | Labour |
| 1924 | Albert Bethel | Conservative |
| 1929 | David Mort | Labour |
| 1931 | John Potter | Conservative |
| 1935 | Robert Cary | Conservative |
| 1945 | William Proctor | Labour |
| 1964 | Lewis Carter-Jones | Labour |
| 1987 | Joan Lestor | Labour |
| 1997 | Ian Stewart | Labour |
| 2010 | constituency abolished: see Salford and Eccles and Worsley and Eccles South | |

== Elections ==
=== Elections in the 2000s ===
General election 2005: Eccles
| Party | Candidate | Votes | % | ±% |
|---|---|---|---|---|
| Labour | Ian Stewart | 19,702 | 56.9 | −7.6 |
| Conservative | Thelma Matuk | 6,816 | 19.7 | −1.0 |
| Liberal Democrats | Jane Brophy | 6,429 | 18.6 | +3.8 |
| UKIP | Peter Reeve | 1,685 | 4.9 | New |
| Majority | | 12,886 | 37.2 | −6.6 |
| Turnout | | 34.632 | 50.2 | +1.9 |
| Labour hold | | Swing | −3.3 | |

General election 2001: Eccles
| Party | Candidate | Votes | % | ±% |
|---|---|---|---|---|
| Labour | Ian Stewart | 21,395 | 64.5 | −2.2 |
| Conservative | Peter Caillard | 6,867 | 20.7 | +2.0 |
| Liberal Democrats | Bob Boyd | 4,920 | 14.8 | +4.1 |
| Majority | | 14,528 | 43.8 | −4.2 |
| Turnout | | 33,182 | 48.3 | −17.3 |
| Labour hold | | Swing | −2.1 | |

=== Elections in the 1990s ===
General election 1997: Eccles
| Party | Candidate | Votes | % | ±% |
|---|---|---|---|---|
| Labour | Ian Stewart | 30,468 | 66.7 | +9.8 |
| Conservative | Gregory Barker | 8,552 | 18.7 | −10.7 |
| Liberal Democrats | Bob Boyd | 4,905 | 10.7 | −1.4 |
| Referendum | John de Roeck | 1,765 | 3.9 | New |
| Majority | | 21,916 | 48.0 | +20.5 |
| Turnout | | 45,690 | 65.6 | −8.5 |
| Labour hold | | Swing | +10.2 | |

General election 1992: Eccles
| Party | Candidate | Votes | % | ±% |
|---|---|---|---|---|
| Labour | Joan Lestor | 27,357 | 56.9 | +6.1 |
| Conservative | Gary J. Ling | 14,131 | 29.4 | −1.9 |
| Liberal Democrats | Geoff C. Reid | 5,835 | 12.1 | −5.8 |
| Green | Richard C. Duriez | 521 | 1.1 | New |
| Natural Law | Joan A. Garner | 270 | 0.6 | New |
| Majority | | 13,226 | 27.5 | +8.0 |
| Turnout | | 48,114 | 74.1 | −0.4 |
| Labour hold | | Swing | +4.0 | |

=== Elections in the 1980s ===
General election 1987: Eccles
| Party | Candidate | Votes | % | ±% |
|---|---|---|---|---|
| Labour | Joan Lestor | 25,346 | 50.8 | +4.9 |
| Conservative | Joy Packalow | 15,647 | 31.3 | −1.9 |
| SDP | Paul Beatty | 8,924 | 17.9 | −2.0 |
| Majority | | 9,699 | 19.5 | +6.8 |
| Turnout | | 49,917 | 74.5 | +4.4 |
| Labour hold | | Swing | +3.5 | |

General election 1983: Eccles
| Party | Candidate | Votes | % | ±% |
|---|---|---|---|---|
| Labour | Lewis Carter-Jones | 21,644 | 45.9 | −7.7 |
| Conservative | David H. Philp | 15,639 | 33.2 | −2.6 |
| Liberal | Kenneth A. Hemsley | 9,392 | 19.9 | +10.1 |
| Communist | Bert Cottam | 485 | 1.0 | +0.2 |
| Majority | | 6,005 | 12.7 | −5.1 |
| Turnout | | 47,160 | 70.1 | |
| Labour hold | | Swing | | |

=== Elections in the 1970s ===
General election 1979: Eccles
| Party | Candidate | Votes | % | ±% |
|---|---|---|---|---|
| Labour | Lewis Carter-Jones | 24,280 | 53.6 | +0.3 |
| Conservative | J Reid | 16,221 | 35.8 | +4.6 |
| Liberal | G Knight | 4,448 | 9.8 | −4.9 |
| Communist | Terry Keenan | 368 | 0.8 | 0.0 |
| Majority | | 8,059 | 17.8 | −4.3 |
| Turnout | | 45,317 | | |
| Labour hold | | Swing | | |

General election October 1974: Eccles
| Party | Candidate | Votes | % | ±% |
|---|---|---|---|---|
| Labour | Lewis Carter-Jones | 22,328 | 53.3 | +3.9 |
| Conservative | Bob Dunn | 13,062 | 31.2 | −1.1 |
| Liberal | A M Collier | 6,170 | 14.7 | −2.8 |
| Communist | Terry Keenan | 348 | 0.8 | −0.1 |
| Majority | | 9,266 | 22.1 | +5.0 |
| Turnout | | 41,908 | | |
| Labour hold | | Swing | | |

General election February 1974: Eccles
| Party | Candidate | Votes | % | ±% |
|---|---|---|---|---|
| Labour | Lewis Carter-Jones | 22,538 | 49.4 | −6.2 |
| Conservative | Bob Dunn | 14,752 | 32.3 | −10.6 |
| Liberal | A M Collier | 7,966 | 17.5 | New |
| Communist | Terry Keenan | 404 | 0.9 | −0.6 |
| Majority | | 7,786 | 17.1 | +4.4 |
| Turnout | | 45,660 | | |
| Labour hold | | Swing | | |

General election 1970: Eccles
| Party | Candidate | Votes | % | ±% |
|---|---|---|---|---|
| Labour | Lewis Carter-Jones | 23,913 | 55.6 | −3.9 |
| Conservative | Rhodes Boyson | 18,458 | 42.9 | +5.4 |
| Communist | Terry Keenan | 643 | 1.5 | −1.5 |
| Majority | | 5,455 | 12.7 | −9.3 |
| Turnout | | 43,014 | | |
| Labour hold | | Swing | | |

=== Elections in the 1960s ===
General election 1966: Eccles
| Party | Candidate | Votes | % | ±% |
|---|---|---|---|---|
| Labour | Lewis Carter-Jones | 25,033 | 59.5 | +2.2 |
| Conservative | Hugh P Holland | 15,776 | 37.5 | −5.2 |
| Communist | Michael R. Bennett | 1,239 | 3.0 | New |
| Majority | | 9,257 | 22.0 | +7.4 |
| Turnout | | 42,048 | | |
| Labour hold | | Swing | | |

General election 1964: Eccles
| Party | Candidate | Votes | % | ±% |
|---|---|---|---|---|
| Labour | Lewis Carter-Jones | 25,915 | 57.3 | +5.3 |
| Conservative | John J Hodgson | 19,277 | 42.7 | −5.3 |
| Majority | | 6,638 | 14.6 | +10.6 |
| Turnout | | 45,192 | | |
| Labour hold | | Swing | | |

=== Elections in the 1950s ===
General election 1959: Eccles
| Party | Candidate | Votes | % | ±% |
|---|---|---|---|---|
| Labour | William Proctor | 25,566 | 52.0 | −0.4 |
| Conservative | Brian Robert Osborne Bell | 23,580 | 48.0 | +0.4 |
| Majority | | 1,986 | 4.0 | −0.8 |
| Turnout | | 49,146 | | |
| Labour hold | | Swing | | |

General election 1955: Eccles
| Party | Candidate | Votes | % | ±% |
|---|---|---|---|---|
| Labour | William Proctor | 25,351 | 52.4 | −0.1 |
| Conservative | Charles P Lawson | 23,025 | 47.6 | 0.0 |
| Majority | | 2,326 | 4.8 | −0.1 |
| Turnout | | 48,376 | | |
| Labour hold | | Swing | | |

General election 1951: Eccles
| Party | Candidate | Votes | % | ±% |
|---|---|---|---|---|
| Labour | William Proctor | 27,941 | 52.5 | +1.8 |
| Conservative | John Whiteley | 25,330 | 47.6 | +6.6 |
| Majority | | 2,611 | 4.9 | −4.8 |
| Turnout | | 53,271 | | |
| Labour hold | | Swing | | |

General election 1950: Eccles
| Party | Candidate | Votes | % | ±% |
|---|---|---|---|---|
| Labour | William Proctor | 27,409 | 50.7 | −0.4 |
| Conservative | Harry Sharp | 22,186 | 41.0 | +6.4 |
| Liberal | J H Jones | 4,477 | 8.3 | −5.5 |
| Majority | | 5,223 | 9.7 | −6.8 |
| Turnout | | 54,072 | | |
| Labour hold | | Swing | | |

=== Elections in the 1940s ===
General election 1945: Eccles
| Party | Candidate | Votes | % | ±% |
|---|---|---|---|---|
| Labour | William Proctor | 23,008 | 51.1 | +3.8 |
| Conservative | Robert Cary | 15,562 | 34.6 | −18.1 |
| Liberal | Arthur Gerald Pollitt | 6,215 | 13.8 | New |
| Independent Progressive | Aubrey Bernard Brocklehurst | 211 | 0.5 | New |
| Majority | | 7,446 | 16.5 | N/A |
| Turnout | | 44,996 | | |
| Labour gain from Conservative | | Swing | +10.9 | |

=== Elections in the 1930s ===
General election 1935: Eccles
| Party | Candidate | Votes | % | ±% |
|---|---|---|---|---|
| Conservative | Robert Cary | 22,310 | 52.7 | −9.1 |
| Labour | J Grierson | 20,055 | 47.3 | +9.1 |
| Majority | | 2,255 | 5.4 | −18.2 |
| Turnout | | 42,365 | | |
| Conservative hold | | Swing | | |

General election 1931: Eccles
| Party | Candidate | Votes | % | ±% |
|---|---|---|---|---|
| Conservative | John Potter | 26,049 | 61.8 | +32.0 |
| Labour | David Mort | 16,101 | 38.2 | −11.6 |
| Majority | | 9,948 | 23.6 | N/A |
| Turnout | | 42,150 | | |
| Conservative gain from Labour | | Swing | | |

=== Elections in the 1920s ===
General election 1929: Eccles
| Party | Candidate | Votes | % | ±% |
|---|---|---|---|---|
| Labour | David Mort | 20,489 | 49.8 | +3.0 |
| Unionist | Albert Bethel | 12,232 | 29.8 | −23.4 |
| Liberal | Handel Wilde | 8,374 | 20.4 | New |
| Majority | | 8,257 | 20.0 | N/A |
| Turnout | | 41,095 | 81.9 | −0.8 |
| Registered electors | | 50,203 | | |
| Labour gain from Unionist | | Swing | +13.2 | |

General election 1924: Eccles
| Party | Candidate | Votes | % | ±% |
|---|---|---|---|---|
| Unionist | Albert Bethel | 16,833 | 53.2 | +17.0 |
| Labour | John Buckle | 14,798 | 46.8 | +4.0 |
| Majority | | 2,035 | 6.4 | N/A |
| Turnout | | 31,631 | 82.7 | +4.5 |
| Registered electors | | 38,257 | | |
| Unionist gain from Labour | | Swing | +6.5 | |

General election 1923: Eccles
| Party | Candidate | Votes | % | ±% |
|---|---|---|---|---|
| Labour | John Buckle | 12,227 | 42.8 | −8.6 |
| Unionist | Marshall Stevens | 10,364 | 36.2 | −12.4 |
| Liberal | William Sandiford Ashton | 6,011 | 21.0 | New |
| Majority | | 1,863 | 6.6 | +3.8 |
| Turnout | | 28,602 | 78.2 | +0.5 |
| Registered electors | | 36,585 | | |
| Labour hold | | Swing | +1.9 | |

General election 1922: Eccles
| Party | Candidate | Votes | % | ±% |
|---|---|---|---|---|
| Labour | John Buckle | 14,354 | 51.4 | New |
| Unionist | Marshall Stevens | 13,551 | 48.6 | −33.7 |
| Majority | | 1,803 | 2.8 | N/A |
| Turnout | | 27,905 | 77.7 | +22.3 |
| Registered electors | | 35,912 | | |
| Labour gain from Unionist | | Swing | | |

=== Elections in the 1910s ===
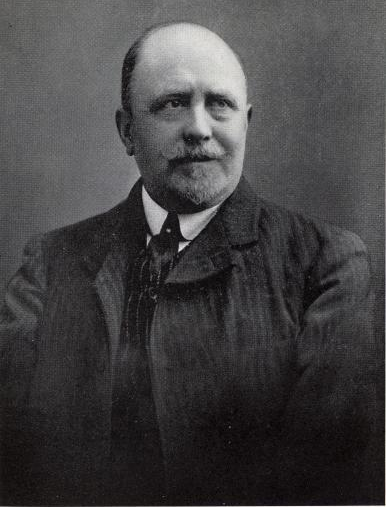
Marshall Stevens

General election 1918: Eccles
| Party | | Candidate | Votes | % | ±% |
|---|---|---|---|---|---|
| C | Unionist | Marshall Stevens | 15,821 | 82.3 | +34.7 |
| | Liberal | Richard Durning Holt | 3,408 | 17.7 | −34.7 |
| Majority | | | 12,413 | 64.6 | N/A |
| Turnout | | | 19,229 | 55.4 | −30.5 |
| Registered electors | | | 34,702 | | |
| | Unionist gain from Liberal | | Swing | +34.7 | |
C indicates candidate endorsed by the coalition government.

General election December 1910: S.E. Lancashire (Eccles)
| Party | Candidate | Votes | % | ±% |
|---|---|---|---|---|
| Liberal | George Pollard | 8,467 | 52.4 | +11.4 |
| Conservative | John Campbell | 7,676 | 47.6 | +8.9 |
| Majority | | 791 | 4.8 | +2.4 |
| Turnout | | 16,143 | 85.9 | −6.1 |
| Registered electors | | 18,786 | | |
| Liberal hold | | Swing | +1.3 | |

General election January 1910: S.E. Lancashire (Eccles)
| Party | Candidate | Votes | % | ±% |
|---|---|---|---|---|
| Liberal | George Pollard | 7,093 | 41.0 | +2.2 |
| Conservative | G F Assinder | 6,682 | 38.7 | +3.9 |
| Labour | G. H. Stuart-Bunning | 3,511 | 20.3 | −6.1 |
| Majority | | 411 | 2.4 | −1.6 |
| Turnout | | 17,286 | 92.0 | +2.5 |
| Registered electors | | 18,786 | | |
| Liberal hold | | Swing | −0.9 | |

=== Elections in the 1900s ===
Pollard

General election 1906: S.E. Lancashire (Eccles)
| Party | Candidate | Votes | % | ±% |
|---|---|---|---|---|
| Liberal | George Pollard | 5,841 | 38.8 | −10.3 |
| Conservative | T Stuttard | 5,246 | 34.8 | −16.1 |
| Labour Repr. Cmte. | Ben Tillett | 3,985 | 26.4 | New |
| Majority | | 595 | 4.0 | N/A |
| Turnout | | 15,072 | 89.5 | +7.1 |
| Registered electors | | 16,832 | | |
| Liberal gain from Conservative | | Swing | +2.9 | |

Fry

General election 1900: S.E. Lancashire (Eccles)
| Party | Candidate | Votes | % | ±% |
|---|---|---|---|---|
| Conservative | Octavius Leigh-Clare | 6,153 | 50.9 | −1.0 |
| Liberal | John Fry | 5,934 | 49.1 | +1.0 |
| Majority | | 219 | 1.8 | −2.0 |
| Turnout | | 12,087 | 82.4 | −2.9 |
| Registered electors | | 14,674 | | |
| Conservative hold | | Swing | −1.0 | |

=== Elections in the 1890s ===
General election 1895: S.E. Lancashire (Eccles)
| Party | Candidate | Votes | % | ±% |
|---|---|---|---|---|
| Conservative | Octavius Leigh-Clare | 5,722 | 51.9 | +3.2 |
| Liberal | Henry John Roby | 5,302 | 48.1 | −3.2 |
| Majority | | 420 | 3.8 | N/A |
| Turnout | | 11,024 | 85.3 | −1.2 |
| Registered electors | | 12,917 | | |
| Conservative gain from Liberal | | Swing | +3.2 | |

General election 1892: S.E. Lancashire (Eccles)
| Party | Candidate | Votes | % | ±% |
|---|---|---|---|---|
| Liberal | Henry John Roby | 5,340 | 51.3 | +3.1 |
| Conservative | Octavius Leigh-Clare | 5,071 | 48.7 | −3.1 |
| Majority | | 269 | 2.6 | N/A |
| Turnout | | 10,411 | 86.5 | +2.0 |
| Registered electors | | 12,040 | | |
| Liberal gain from Conservative | | Swing | +3.1 | |

1890 Eccles by-election
| Party | Candidate | Votes | % | ±% |
|---|---|---|---|---|
| Liberal | Henry John Roby | 4,901 | 51.1 | +2.9 |
| Conservative | Algernon Egerton | 4,696 | 48.9 | −2.9 |
| Majority | | 205 | 2.2 | N/A |
| Turnout | | 9,597 | 86.2 | +1.7 |
| Registered electors | | 11,136 | | |
| Liberal gain from Conservative | | Swing | +2.9 | |

=== Elections in the 1880s ===
General election 1886: S.E. Lancashire (Eccles)
| Party | Candidate | Votes | % | ±% |
|---|---|---|---|---|
| Conservative | Algernon Egerton | 4,277 | 51.8 | +0.4 |
| Liberal | Ellis Duncombe Gosling | 3,985 | 48.2 | −0.4 |
| Majority | | 292 | 3.6 | +0.8 |
| Turnout | | 8,262 | 84.5 | −6.2 |
| Registered electors | | 9,781 | | |
| Conservative hold | | Swing | +0.4 | |

General election 1885: S.E. Lancashire (Eccles)
| Party | Candidate | Votes | % | ±% |
|---|---|---|---|---|
| Conservative | Algernon Egerton | 4,559 | 51.4 | |
| Liberal | Vernor Kirk Armitage | 4,312 | 48.6 | |
| Majority | | 247 | 2.8 | |
| Turnout | | 8,871 | 90.7 | |
| Registered electors | | 9,781 | | |
| Conservative win (new seat) | | | | |

== See also ==
- parliamentary constituencies in Greater Manchester
