= Winton, Greater Manchester =

Coordinates: 53.486°N 2.365°W

Winton
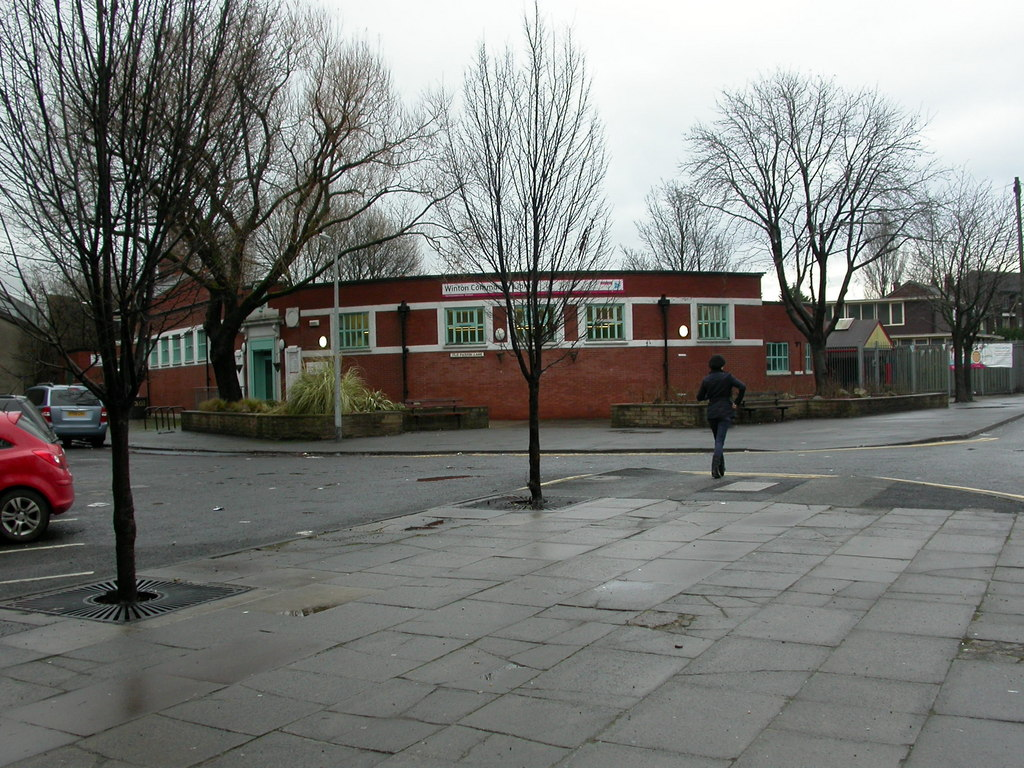
- Winton Community Library

- Location within Greater Manchester
- Population: 12,339 (2014 estimate)
- OS grid reference: SJ757988
- Metropolitan borough: Salford
- Metropolitan county: Greater Manchester
- Region: North West
- Country: England
- Sovereign state: United Kingdom
- Post town: MANCHESTER
- Postcode district: M30
- Dialling code: 0161
- Police: Greater Manchester
- Fire: Greater Manchester
- Ambulance: North West
- UK Parliament: Worsley and Eccles South
- Councillors: Margaret Morris (Labour); Paula Boshell (Labour); David Lancaster (Labour)

Winton is an area of the City of Salford in Greater Manchester, England, which in 2014 had a population of 12,339.

Historically in Lancashire, Winton is a residential area surrounded by Patricroft, Peel Green, Monton, Barton-upon-Irwell, Eccles and Worsley.

== Governance ==
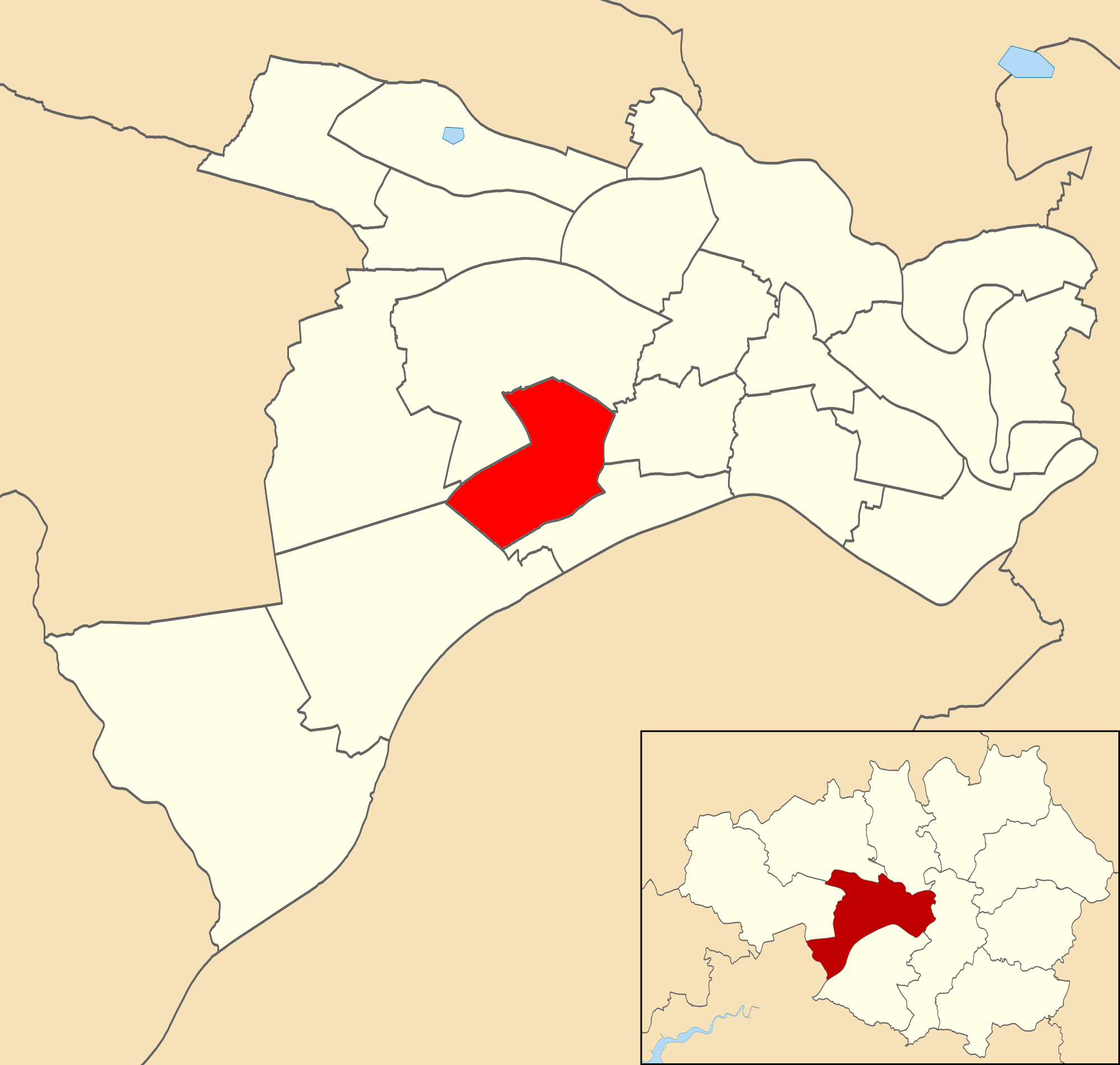
Winton electoral ward within Salford City Council.

Winton is represented in Westminster by Barbara Keeley, MP for Worsley and Eccles South.

=== Councillors ===
From 2004 to 2021 the area, along with Peel Green, was represented on Salford City Council by three councillors serving the ward of Winton.

Election	Councillor	Councillor	Councillor
2004	Margaret Morris (Lab)	John Pooley (Lib Dem)	David Lancaster (Lab)
2006	Margaret Morris (Lab)	John Pooley (Lib Dem)	David Lancaster (Lab)
2007	Margaret Morris (Lab)	Paula Boshell (Lab)	David Lancaster (Lab)
2008	Margaret Morris (Lab)	Paula Boshell (Lab)	David Lancaster (Lab)
2010	Margaret Morris (Lab)	Paula Boshell (Lab)	David Lancaster (Lab)
2011	Margaret Morris (Lab)	Paula Boshell (Lab)	David Lancaster (Lab)
2012	Margaret Morris (Lab)	Paula Boshell (Lab)	David Lancaster (Lab)
2014	Margaret Morris (Lab)	Paula Boshell (Lab)	David Lancaster (Lab)
2015	Margaret Morris (Lab)	Paula Boshell (Lab)	David Lancaster (Lab)
2016	Margaret Morris (Lab)	Paula Boshell (Lab)	David Lancaster (Lab)
2018	Margaret Morris (Lab)	Paula Boshell (Lab)	David Lancaster (Lab)
2019	Margaret Morris (Lab)	Paula Boshell (Lab)	David Lancaster (Lab)
2021	Ward abolished		

indicates seat up for re-election.

Boundary changes coming in to effect at the 2021 Salford City Council election abolished the Winton ward and the Barton and Winton ward was created in its place.

== Geography ==
Winton is between Monton, Worsley, Peel Green and Patricroft, divided by the motorway interchange of the M602, M60 and M62. The boundaries of Winton are the Liverpool-Manchester railway on New Lane (borders with Peel Green), the railway on Worsley Road (borders with Patricroft), the Bridgewater Canal bridge at the top of Parrin Lane (borders with Monton) and the Worsley Road/Barton Road change (borders with Worsley).

== History ==
=== Early history ===
Winton, along with some of its neighbouring villages, including Barton and Monton, is believed to be Saxon in origin. However, Winton is not in the Domesday Book although neighbouring Barton is. Winton is believed to have been originally known as Withinton. In 1262, Richard de Winton was granted 7 acres (28,000 m^{2}) of land by former landowner, Thomas Grelley, at a rate of one shilling and two pence (1s 2d or 6p) per year. These 7 acres (28,000 m^{2}) grew over the next few decades to become the hamlet of Winton.

=== Churches ===
Churches in Winton used to include the Roman Catholic Church of St. Matthew's (which is now a Polish centre), next to Winton Library on Worsley Road, and St. Mary Magdalene's Parish Church on Grasmere Crescent/Westbourne Road (a Grade II listed building). The Baptist church on Parrin Lane was destroyed in an arson attack in 2010. The oldest building is Magdalene Centre, formerly a school before Westwood Park was opened, dating from 1888.

=== Transport ===
==== Buses ====
Diamond North West and Stagecoach Manchester operate bus services through Winton from Eccles town centre, Manchester, the Trafford Centre and Wigan. Winton is also a through-route for buses to the Trafford Centre, Wigan, Worsley and Eccles.

==== Rail ====
Winton does not have a railway station. The nearest station is in Patricroft at which one train an hour stops en route between Manchester Victoria and Liverpool Lime Street. These services are run by Northern Trains. The station is not serviced on Sunday or Bank Holidays. Winton does not have a nearby Manchester Metrolink station, the nearest one being in Eccles town centre.

==== Road ====
The M60 and M602 both go through Winton. On the M60 the nearest motorway exits are Junctions 13 (Worsley) and 11 (Peel Green). On the M602 the nearest exit is Junction 1 (Eccles).

=== Education ===
Winton has a number of schools including Westwood Park Community Primary; St. Gilbert's RC Primary and the St. Patrick's Catholic Secondary School on the border with Peel Green.

=== Winton Park ===
Winton is also the home to Winton Park, a three-time winner of the Green Flag award. It was first opened in 1906 and has recently undergone a major refurbishment which included the design of a new central grassed area, installation of public toilets and improvements to the bowlers' pavilion.

The park also features a bowling green, children's play area, multi-use games area and outdoor gym equipment.

Schools and community groups are welcome to use the site and a range of outdoor education and volunteering opportunities are regularly organised.
