= Swinton North =

- Electoral ward
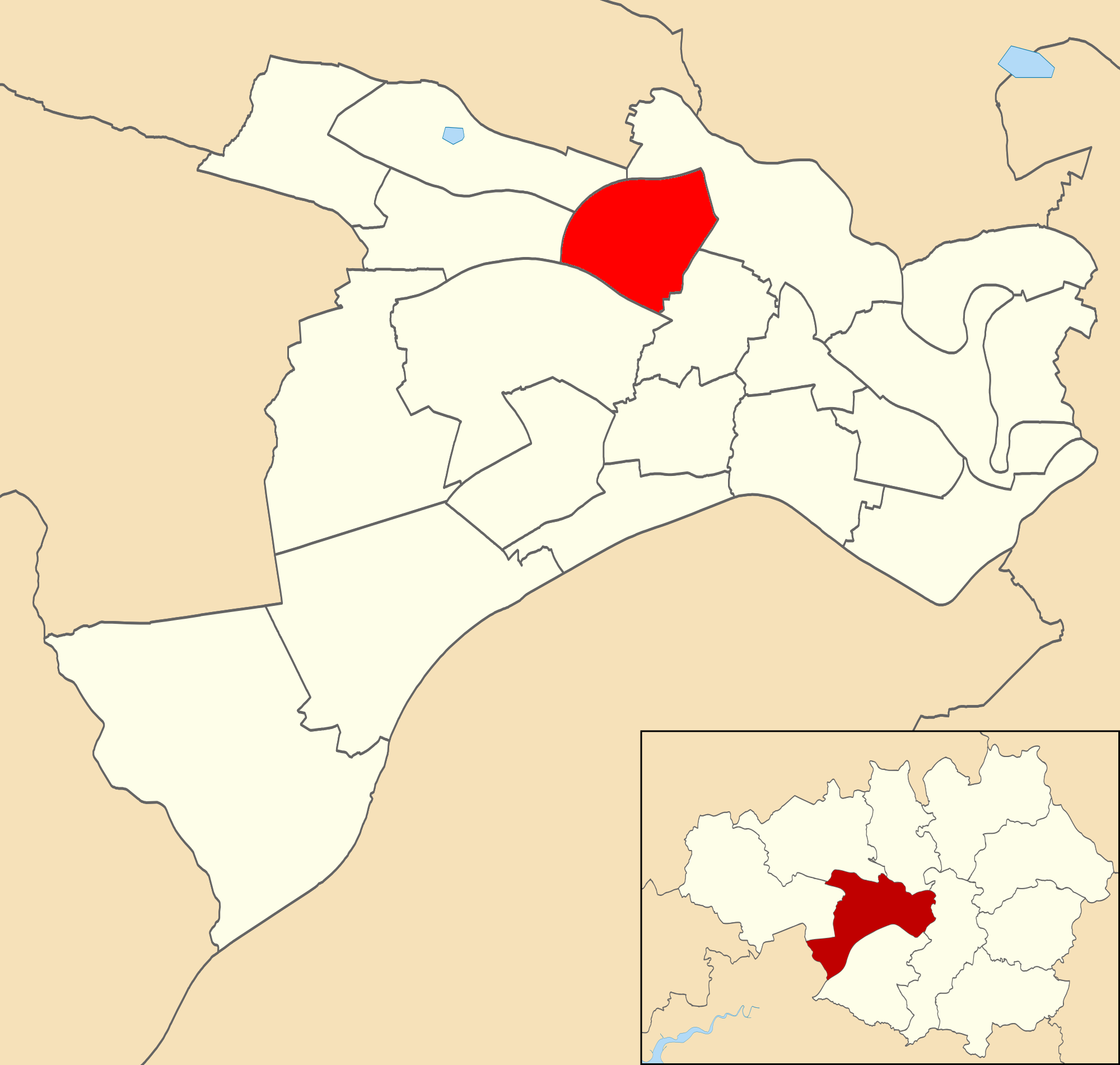
- Swinton North ward within Salford City Council.

- Coat of arms
- Motto: Let the good (or safety) of the people be the supreme (or highest) law
- Interactive map of Swinton North
- Coordinates: 53.5168°N 2.3510°W
- Country: United Kingdom
- Constituent country: England
- Region: North West England
- County: Greater Manchester
- Metropolitan borough: Salford
- Created: May 2004
- Abolished: May 2021
- Named for: Swinton

Government UK Parliament constituency: Salford and Eccles
  - Type: Unicameral
  - Body: Salford City Council
  - Mayor of Salford: Paul Dennett (Labour)

Population
  - Total: 11,473
- Ward profile conducted by Salford City Council in 2014.

Swinton North was an electoral ward of Salford, England between 2004 and 2021. It is represented in Westminster by Rebecca Long-Bailey MP for Salford and Eccles. A profile of the ward conducted by Salford City Council in 2014 recorded a population of 11,473.

The ward was to be abolished following a review by the Local Government Boundary Commission for England

== Councillors ==
The ward is represented by three councillors:

| Election | Councillor | Councillor | Councillor |
|---|---|---|---|
| 2004 | Charles William Hinds (Lab) | James Dawson (Lab) | Derek Antrobus (Lab Co-op) |
| 2006 | Charles William Hinds (Lab) | James Dawson (Lab) | Derek Antrobus (Lab Co-op) |
| 2007 | Charles William Hinds (Lab) | James Dawson (Lab) | Derek Antrobus (Lab Co-op) |
| 2008 | Charles William Hinds (Lab) | James Dawson (Lab) | Derek Antrobus (Lab Co-op) |
| 2010 | Bill Hinds (Lab) | James Dawson (Lab) | Derek Antrobus (Lab Co-op) |
| 2011 | Bill Hinds (Lab) | James Dawson (Lab) | Derek Antrobus (Lab Co-op) |
| 2012 | Bill Hinds (Lab) | James Dawson (Lab) | Derek Antrobus (Lab Co-op) |
| 2014 | Bill Hinds (Lab) | James Dawson (Lab) | Derek Antrobus (Lab Co-op) |
| 2015 | Bill Hinds (Lab) | James Dawson (Lab) | Derek Antrobus (Lab Co-op) |
| 2016 | Bill Hinds (Lab) | James Dawson (Lab) | Derek Antrobus (Lab Co-op) |
| 2018 | Bill Hinds (Lab) | James Dawson (Lab) | Derek Antrobus (Lab Co-op) |
| 2019 | | | |
| 2021 | Ward abolished | | |

indicates seat up for re-election.

== Elections in 2010s ==
=== May 2018 ===
2018
| Party | Candidate | Votes | % | ±% |
|---|---|---|---|---|
| Labour | Bill Hinds* | 1,385 | 60.5 | |
| Conservative | Andy Cheetham | 513 | 22.4 | |
| UKIP | Andy Olsen | 168 | 7.3 | |
| Green | Liam Waite | 131 | 5.7 | |
| Liberal Democrats | Adam Slack | 91 | 4.0 | |
| Majority | | 872 | 38.1 | |
| Turnout | | 2,292 | 27.34 | |
| Labour hold | | Swing | | |

=== May 2016 ===
2016
| Party | Candidate | Votes | % | ±% |
|---|---|---|---|---|
| Labour Co-op | Derek Antrobus* | 1,340 | 61.6 | +7.3 |
| UKIP | Stacey Olsen | 619 | 23.2 | +1.9 |
| Conservative | Sharon Bulmer | 500 | 18.8 | −1.9 |
| Green | Steven John Willett | 137 | 5.1 | N/A |
| TUSC | Norma Frances Parkinson-Green | 67 | 2.5 | −0.8 |
| Majority | | 721 | 27.1 | −5.9 |
| Turnout | | 2,663 | 31.8 | −27.5 |
| Labour Co-op hold | | Swing | | |

=== May 2015 ===
2015
| Party | Candidate | Votes | % | ±% |
|---|---|---|---|---|
| Labour | Jim Dawson* | 2,716 | 54.3 | +4.8 |
| UKIP | John Mark Deas | 1,066 | 21.3 | −7.2 |
| Conservative | Sharon Bulmer | 1,035 | 20.7 | +3.0 |
| TUSC | Norma Frances Parkinson-Green | 163 | 3.3 | N/A |
| Majority | | 1,650 | 33.0 | +12.0 |
| Turnout | | 5,006 | 59.3 | |
| Labour hold | | Swing | | |

=== May 2014 ===
2014
| Party | Candidate | Votes | % | ±% |
|---|---|---|---|---|
| Labour | Bill Hinds | 1,336 | 49.5 | |
| UKIP | Glyn Alan Wright | 770 | 28.5 | |
| Conservative | Sharon Bulmer | 479 | 17.7 | |
| English Democrat | Paul Officer | 115 | 4.3 | |
| Majority | | 566 | 21.0 | |
| Turnout | | 2,700 | | |
| Labour hold | | Swing | | |

=== May 2012 ===
2012
| Party | Candidate | Votes | % | ±% |
|---|---|---|---|---|
| Labour Co-op | Derek Antrobus* | 1,336 | 50.5 | +8.8 |
| Community Action | Michael Moulding | 541 | 20.4 | N/A |
| Conservative | Shirley Walsh | 326 | 12.3 | −22.8 |
| English Democrat | Paul Officer | 176 | 6.7 | N/A |
| Liberal Democrats | Valerie Gregory | 157 | 5.9 | −17.2 |
| Green | Reg Howard | 110 | 4.2 | N/A |
| Majority | | 795 | 30.0 | |
| Turnout | | 2,669 | 30.5 | −0.8 |
| Labour hold | | Swing | | |

=== May 2011 ===
2011
| Party | Candidate | Votes | % | ±% |
|---|---|---|---|---|
| Labour | James Dawson* | 1,813 | 61.1 | +9.8 |
| Conservative | Mark Unwin | 706 | 23.8 | −1.5 |
| Green | Reg Howard | 251 | 8.5 | N/A |
| Liberal Democrats | Valerie Gregory | 196 | 6.6 | −17.8 |
| Majority | | 1,107 | | |
| Turnout | | 2,984 | 34.5 | |
| Labour hold | | Swing | | |

=== May 2010 ===
2010
| Party | Candidate | Votes | % | ±% |
|---|---|---|---|---|
| Labour | Bill Hinds* | 2,420 | 48.2 | +6.5 |
| Liberal Democrats | Tamara Cooke | 1,104 | 22.0 | −1.2 |
| Conservative | Shneur Odze | 945 | 18.8 | −16.4 |
| BNP | John Leach | 555 | 11.0 | +11.0 |
| Majority | | 1,316 | 26.2 | +19.7 |
| Turnout | | 5,024 | 58.6 | +27.3 |
| Labour hold | | Swing | | |

== Elections in 2000s ==
2008
| Party | Candidate | Votes | % | ±% |
|---|---|---|---|---|
| Labour Co-op | Derek Antrobus | 1,122 | 41.7 | −8.6 |
| Conservative | Shirley Walsh | 947 | 35.2 | +9.9 |
| Liberal Democrats | Tamara Cooke | 624 | 23.2 | −1.3 |
| Majority | | 175 | 6.5 | |
| Turnout | | | 31.3 | |
| Labour hold | | Swing | | |

2007
| Party | Candidate | Votes | % | ±% |
|---|---|---|---|---|
| Labour | James Dawson* | 1,295 | 50.3 | |
| Conservative | Michael Edwards | 652 | 25.3 | |
| Liberal Democrats | Tamara Cooke | 629 | 24.4 | |
| Majority | | 643 | | |
| Turnout | | 2,576 | 30.5 | |
| Labour hold | | Swing | | |

2006
| Party | Candidate | Votes | % | ±% |
|---|---|---|---|---|
| Labour | Charles Hinds | 1,107 | 46.8 | |
| Conservative | Michael Edward | 662 | 28.0 | |
| Liberal Democrats | Paul Gregory | 596 | 25.2 | |
| Majority | | 455 | 18.8 | |
| Turnout | | 2,365 | 28.6 | −6.7 |
| Labour hold | | Swing | | |

2004
| Party | Candidate | Votes | % | ±% |
|---|---|---|---|---|
| Labour Co-op | Derek Antrobus | 1,326 | | |
| Labour | James Dawson | 1,286 | | |
| Labour | Charles William Hinds | 1,147 | | |
| Liberal Democrats | Valerie Gregory | 1,039 | | |
| Conservative | Patricia Mills | 798 | | |
| Turnout | | 5,596 | 35.3 | |
| Labour win (new seat) | | | | |
| Labour win (new seat) | | | | |
| Labour win (new seat) | | | | |
