= Salford and Eccles =

UK Parliament constituency (2010–2024)

Coordinates: 53°31′N 2°20′W

- Former borough constituency for the House of Commons
- Boundary of Salford and Eccles in Greater Manchester

- Location of Greater Manchester within England
- County: Greater Manchester
- Electorate: 76,863 (December 2010)
- Major settlements: Swinton, Eccles, Salford

2010–2024
- Seats: One
- Created from: Salford; Eccles
- Replaced by: Salford, Worsley and Eccles

Salford and Eccles was a constituency (Note: A borough constituency (for the purposes of election expenses and type of returning officer)) in the House of Commons of the UK Parliament. For its entire creation since 2010, it was represented by members of the Labour Party. (Note: As with all constituencies, the constituency elects one Member of Parliament (MP) by the first past the post system of election at least every five years.)

Further to the completion of the 2023 Periodic Review of Westminster constituencies, the seat was abolished. Subject to boundary changes, involving the loss of Eccles, it was reformed as Salford, which was contested at the 2024 general election.

== History ==
The constituency was created following the Boundary Commission's Fifth Periodic Review of Westminster constituencies (ended 2008), and was first contested at the 2010 general election. The review led to the loss of one seat in Greater Manchester, and the 2010 Salford and Eccles seat covered parts of the previous Salford and Eccles constituencies.

The last MP for Salford was Hazel Blears, whereas the last MP for Eccles was Ian Stewart. Hazel Blears was chosen as the Labour Party candidate to represent the new constituency at the 2010 general election. Following Blears's retirement, Labour member Rebecca Long-Bailey was elected to replace her in 2015.

== Constituency profile ==
This constituency has undergone significant regeneration since the decline of the textile industry. Salford Quays became Britain's Media City as the home of the BBC and ITV in the North of England, and the University of Salford commenced a £150 million redevelopment in 2008. Aside from the flagship MediaCityUK complex whose housing consists of exclusive apartments, the nearby deprived areas such as Weaste and Seedley are also undergoing regeneration. Also in the seat were Swinton, a residential suburb and the administrative headquarters of Salford City Council, and Eccles, though its outskirts are in Worsley and Eccles South.

The constituency and the overall City of Salford (Note: which achieved that status in 1926) voted to Leave the European Union although the Ordsall (Salford Quays) and Eccles wards voted Remain.

In statistics

The constituency consisted of a working population whose income is below the national average and higher than average reliance upon social housing. At the end of 2012 the unemployment rate in the constituency stood as 5.0% of the population claiming jobseekers allowance, compared to the regional average of 4.2%. The borough contributing to the bulk of the seat has a high 44.5% of its population without a car, a close-to-average 23.1% of the population without qualifications and a high 28.9% with level 4 qualifications or above. In terms of tenure only 37.8% of homes are owned outright or on a mortgage as at the 2011 census across the city. In 2017, has risen to over 60% for the first time since 1992 for this area, taking into account previous seats. In 2001 the turnout for the previous Salford seat was just 41%, though the national election turnout was also lower than average that year.

== Boundaries ==
Map of boundaries 2010–2024

The electoral wards included in the Salford and Eccles constituency in the City of Salford are:

- Claremont
- Eccles
- Irwell Riverside
- Langworthy
- Ordsall
- Pendlebury
- Swinton North
- Swinton South
- Weaste and Seedley

Eccles was approximately bisected following the recommendations of the review; for its southern areas see Worsley and Eccles South.

== Members of Parliament ==
| Election | Member | Party |
|---|---|---|
| 2010 | Hazel Blears | Labour |
| 2015 | Rebecca Long-Bailey | Labour |

== Elections ==
=== Elections in the 2010s ===
General election 2019: Salford and Eccles
| Party | Candidate | Votes | % | ±% |
|---|---|---|---|---|
| Labour | Rebecca Long-Bailey | 28,755 | 56.8 | −8.8 |
| Conservative | Attika Choudhary | 12,428 | 24.5 | −0.8 |
| Brexit Party | Matt Mickler | 4,290 | 8.5 | New |
| Liberal Democrats | Jake Overend | 3,099 | 6.1 | +3.4 |
| Green | Bryan Blears | 2,060 | 4.1 | +2.4 |
| Majority | | 16,327 | 32.3 | −8.0 |
| Turnout | | 50,632 | 61.6 | +0.8 |
| Labour hold | | Swing | −4.0 | |

General election 2017: Salford and Eccles
| Party | Candidate | Votes | % | ±% |
|---|---|---|---|---|
| Labour | Rebecca Long-Bailey | 31,168 | 65.6 | +16.2 |
| Conservative | Jason Sugarman | 12,036 | 25.3 | +4.9 |
| UKIP | Christopher Barnes | 2,320 | 4.9 | −13.1 |
| Liberal Democrats | John Reid | 1,286 | 2.7 | −1.0 |
| Green | Wendy Olsen | 809 | 1.7 | −3.5 |
| Majority | | 19,132 | 40.3 | +11.3 |
| Turnout | | 47,619 | 60.8 | +2.6 |
| Labour hold | | Swing | +5.6 | |

General election 2015: Salford and Eccles
| Party | Candidate | Votes | % | ±% |
|---|---|---|---|---|
| Labour | Rebecca Long-Bailey | 21,364 | 49.4 | +9.3 |
| Conservative | Greg Downes | 8,823 | 20.4 | −0.1 |
| UKIP | Paul Doyle | 7,806 | 18.0 | +15.4 |
| Green | Emma Van Dyke | 2,251 | 5.2 | +5.2 |
| Liberal Democrats | Charlie Briggs | 1,614 | 3.7 | −22.6 |
| We are the Reality Party | Mark "Bez" Berry | 703 | 1.6 | New |
| TUSC | Noreen Bailey | 517 | 1.2 | −0.6 |
| Pirate | Sam Clark | 183 | 0.4 | New |
| Majority | | 12,541 | 29.0 | +15.2 |
| Turnout | | 43,261 | 58.2 | +3.2 |
| Labour hold | | Swing | +4.7 | |

General election 2010: Salford and Eccles
| Party | Candidate | Votes | % | ±% |
|---|---|---|---|---|
| Labour | Hazel Blears* | 16,655 | 40.1 | −15.3 |
| Liberal Democrats | Norman Owen | 10,930 | 26.3 | +3.5 |
| Conservative | Matthew Sephton | 8,497 | 20.5 | +3.6 |
| BNP | Tina Wingfield | 2,632 | 6.3 | New |
| UKIP | Duran O'Dwyer | 1,084 | 2.6 | −2.3 |
| TUSC | David Henry | 730 | 1.8 | New |
| English Democrat | Stephen Morris | 621 | 1.5 | New |
| Independent | Richard Carvath | 384 | 0.9 | New |
| Majority | | 5,725 | 13.8 | −18.9 |
| Turnout | | 41,533 | 55.0 | +9.5 |
| Labour hold | | Swing | −9.4 | |

* Served as an MP in the 2005–2010 Parliament

== See also ==
- List of parliamentary constituencies in Greater Manchester
