= Weaste and Seedley =

- Electoral ward
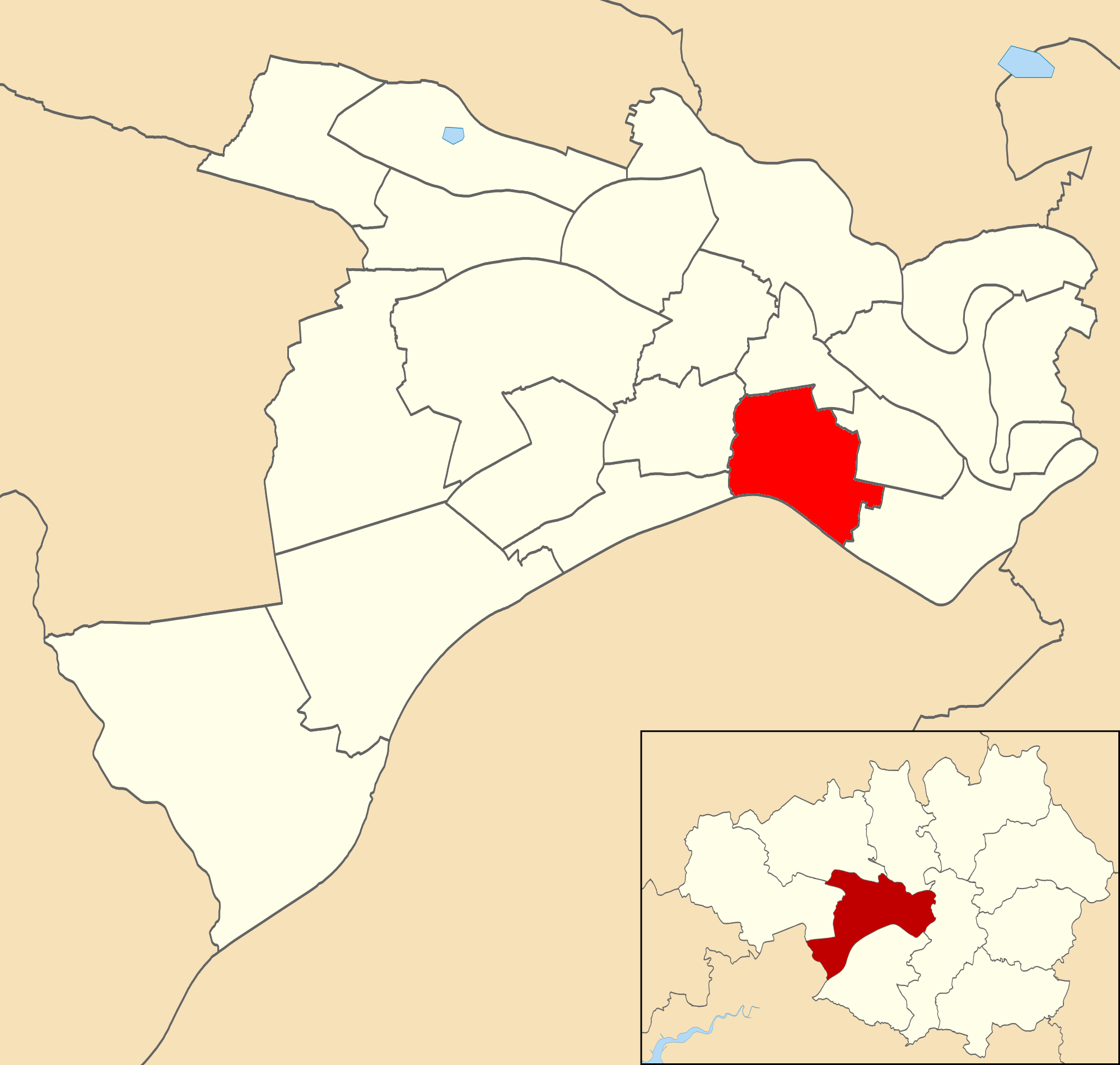
- Weaste & Seedley ward within Salford City Council.

- Coat of arms
- Motto: Let the good (or safety) of the people be the supreme (or highest) law
- Interactive map of Weaste and Seedley
- Coordinates: 53.4851°N 2.3142°W
- Country: United Kingdom
- Constituent country: England
- Region: North West England
- County: Greater Manchester
- Metropolitan borough: Salford
- Created: May 2004
- Named for: Weaste and Seedley, Salford

Government UK Parliament constituency: Salford and Eccles
  - Type: Unicameral
  - Body: Salford City Council
  - Mayor of Salford: Paul Dennett (Labour)
  - Councillor: Philip Cusack (Labour)
  - Councillor: Paul Doyle (Reform)
  - Councillor: Charlotte Youd (Labour)

Population
  - Total: 12,616
- Ward profile conducted by Salford City Council in 2014.

Weaste and Seedley is an electoral ward of Salford, England. It is represented in Westminster by Rebecca Long-Bailey MP for Salford and Eccles. A profile of the ward conducted by Salford City Council in 2014 recorded a population of 12,616.

== Councillors ==
The ward is represented by three councillors: Philip Cusack (Labour), Paul Doyle (Reform UK) and Charlotte Youd (Labour).

Election	Councillor	Councillor	Councillor
2004	Rick Powell (Lab)	Geoffrey Ainsworth (Lib Dem)	Janice Heywood (Lib Dem)
2006	John Deas (Lib Dem)	Geoffrey Ainsworth (Lib Dem)	Janice Heywood (Lib Dem)
2007	John Deas (Lib Dem)	Geoffrey Ainsworth (Lib Dem)	Janice Heywood (Lib Dem)
2008	John Deas (Lib Dem)	Geoffrey Ainsworth (Lib Dem)	Janice Heywood (Lib Dem)
2010	Ronnie Wilson (Labour Co-op)	Geoffrey Ainsworth (Ind)	Janice Heywood (Lib Dem)
2011	Ronnie Wilson (Labour Co-op)	Jan Rochford (Labour Co-op)	Janice Heywood (Lib Dem)
2012	Ronnie Wilson (Labour Co-op)	Jan Rochford (Labour Co-op)	Thomas Murphy (Lab)
By-election; 20 June 2013	Ronnie Wilson (Labour Co-op)	Paul Wilson (Lab)	Thomas Murphy (Lab)
By-election; 10 October 2013	Ronnie Wilson (Labour Co-op)	Paul Wilson (Lab)	Stephen Hesling (Lab)
2014	Ronnie Wilson (Labour Co-op)	Paul Wilson (Lab)	Stephen Hesling (Lab)
2015	Ronnie Wilson (Labour Co-op)	Paul Wilson (Lab)	Stephen Hesling (Lab)
2016	Ronnie Wilson (Labour Co-op)	Paul Wilson (Lab)	Stephen Hesling (Lab)
2018	Ronnie Wilson (Labour Co-op)	Paul Wilson (Lab)	Stephen Hesling (Lab)
2019	Ronnie Wilson (Labour Co-op)	Madeline Wade (Lab)	Stephen Hesling (Lab)
2021^{†}	Alexis Shama (Lab)	Madeline Wade (Lab)	Philip Cusack (Lab)
2022	Alexis Shama (Lab)	Madeline Wade (Lab)	Philip Cusack (Lab)
2023	Alexis Shama (Lab)	Charlotte Youd (Lab)	Philip Cusack (Lab)
2024	Alexis Shama (Lab)	Charlotte Youd (Lab)	Philip Cusack (Lab)
2026	Paul Doyle (Ref)	Charlotte Youd (Lab)	Philip Cusack (Lab)

^† All-out election due to boundary changes

indicates seat up for re-election. indicates seat contested in a by-election.

== Elections in 2020s ==
=== May 2026 ===
2026
Party	Candidate	Votes	%	±%
Reform	Paul Doyle	1,173	33.3	N/A
Green	James Robertson	949	27.0	+14.7
Labour	Alexis Shama	926	26.3	−33.6
Conservative	Anne Broomhead	212	6.0	−4.2
Liberal Democrats	Oliver Scott	192	5.5	+1.3
Your Party	John Warmisham	66	1.9	N/A
Majority		247	7.0	N/A
Rejected ballots		13	0.4	-1.1
Turnout		3,531	31.7	+7.7
Registered electors		11,146		
Reform gain from Labour				

=== May 2024 ===
2024
Party	Candidate	Votes	%	±%
Labour	Phil Cusak*	1,595	59.9	−5.9
Green	Andrew Nadin	327	12.3	+4.5
Conservative	Dan Whitehouse	271	10.2	−1.0
Women's Equality	Carmen Wood-Hope	240	9.0	+4.0
Liberal Democrats	Ninad Oak	112	4.2	−3.5
Communist	Chris Neville	77	2.9	N/A
Rejected ballots		41	1.5	
Majority		1268	47.6	
Turnout		2663	24.0	
Registered electors		11,090		
Labour hold		Swing		

=== May 2023 ===
2023
Party	Candidate	Votes	%	±%
Labour	Charlotte Youd	1,438	65.8	+2.1
Conservative	Alan Lederberger	244	11.2	N/A
Green	Andrea Romero O'Brien	170	7.8	N/A
Liberal Democrats	John Grant	169	7.7	−13.6
Women's Equality	Donna-Maree Louise Humphery	109	5.0	−8.0
SDP	Stephen James Lewthwaite	40	1.8	N/A
Majority		1,194	54.6	
Rejected ballots		14	0.6	
Turnout		2,184	20.1	
Registered electors		10,842		
Labour hold		Swing		

=== May 2022 ===
2022
Party	Candidate	Votes	%	±%
Labour	Alexis Shama*	1,302	63.7	−1.5
Liberal Democrats	Paul Heilbron	436	21.3	+6.4
Women's Equality	Donna-Maree Humphery	265	13.0	N/A
Majority		866	42.3	
Turnout		2045	18.99	−5.45
Registered electors		10,767		
Labour hold		Swing		

=== May 2021 ===
2021
Party	Candidate	Votes	%	±%
Labour	Philip Cusack	1,747	65.2	N/A
Labour	Madeline Wade	1,423	53.1	N/A
Labour	Alexis Shama	1,330	49.6	N/A
Conservative	Michael Richman	529	19.7	N/A
Liberal Democrats	Andrew Markham	398	14.9	N/A
Independent	Barrie Fallows	365	13.6	N/A
Turnout		2,679	24.44	N/A
Labour win (new seat)				
Labour win (new seat)				
Labour win (new seat)				

== Elections in 2010s ==
=== May 2019 ===
2019
Party	Candidate	Votes	%	±%
Labour	Madeline Wade	1,006	43.9	
UKIP	Barrie Michael Fallows	421	18.4	
Independent	Paul Wilson*	303	13.2	
Green	Guy Nicholas Otten	220	9.6	
Conservative	Javaid Hussain	191	8.3	
Liberal Democrats	Andy Markham	148	6.5	
Majority		585		
Turnout		2,300	24.81	
Labour gain from Independent		Swing		

=== May 2018 ===
2018
Party	Candidate	Votes	%	±%
Labour Co-op	Ronnie Wilson*	1,302	59.8	
Conservative	Nicky Turner	390	17.9	
UKIP	Barrie Fallows	205	9.4	
Liberal Democrats	Andy Markham	147	6.7	
Green	Rob Stephenson	134	6.2	
Majority		912	41.9	
Turnout		2,185	23.52	
Labour Co-op hold		Swing		

=== May 2016 ===
2016
Party	Candidate	Votes	%	±%
Labour	Stephen Hesling*	1,268	51.5	+5.5
UKIP	Barrie Michael Fallows	591	24.0	+2.2
Conservative	Adam Charles Edward Kennaugh	342	13.9	−2.5
Green	Rob Stephenson	172	7.0	−0.1
TUSC	Becci Heagney	65	2.6	+0.1
Majority		677	27.5	+3.3
Turnout		2,460	28.2	−27.6
Labour hold		Swing		

=== May 2015 ===
2015
Party	Candidate	Votes	%	±%
Labour	Paul Ronald Wilson*	2,279	46.0	−11.0
UKIP	Barrie Fallows	1,080	21.8	N/A
Conservative	Adam Charles Edward Kennaugh	813	16.4	−7.0
Green	Peter John Mulleady	353	7.1	N/A
Liberal Democrats	Robert Vaughan	285	5.8	N/A
TUSC	Paul Quinn	122	2.5	−17.2
Majority		1,199	24.2	−9.2
Turnout		4,952	55.8	
Labour hold		Swing		

=== May 2014 ===
2014
Party	Candidate	Votes	%	±%
Labour Co-op	Ronnie Wilson	1,401	57.0	
Conservative	Adam Kennaugh	578	23.4	
TUSC	Paul Quinn	486	19.7	
Majority		823	33.4	
Turnout		2465		
Labour Co-op hold		Swing		

=== By-election 10 October 2013 ===
By-election 10 October 2013
Party	Candidate	Votes	%	±%
Labour	Stephen Hesling	803	52.9	
UKIP	Glyn Wright	280	18.4	
Conservative	Adam Kennaugh	240	15.8	
Independent	Matt Simpson	96	6.3	
Green	Andrew Olsen	42	2.8	
BNP	Kay Pollitt	29	1.9	
TUSC	Terry Simmons	24	1.4	
Majority		523	34.5	
Turnout		1,518	16.6	
Labour hold		Swing		

=== By-election 20 June 2013 ===
By-election 20 June 2013
Party	Candidate	Votes	%	±%
Labour	Paul Wilson	785	44.4	−10.3
UKIP	Glyn Wright	401	22.7	+22.7
Conservative	Adam Kennaugh	260	14.7	+2.0
Green	Mary Ferrer	80	4.5	+4.5
BNP	Kay Pollitt	74	4.2	−4.5
Independent	Matt Simpson	64	3.6	+3.6
Liberal Democrats	Valerie Kelly	58	3.3	−15.4
TUSC	Terry Simmons	30	1.7	+1.7
Independent	Alan Valentine	15	0.8	+0.8
Majority		384		
Turnout		1778	19.9	
Labour hold		Swing		

=== May 2012 ===
2012
Party	Candidate	Votes	%	±%
Labour Co-op	Thomas Murphy	1,240	54.7	+32.3
Liberal Democrats	Mary Ferrer	424	18.7	−23.4
Conservative	Adam Kennaugh	287	12.7	−3.1
BNP	Tommy Williams	197	8.7	N/A
Community Action	Jo Russell	119	5.2	N/A
Majority		816	36.0	
Turnout		2,267	25.8	−7.5
Labour Co-op gain from Liberal Democrats		Swing		

=== May 2011 ===
2011
Party	Candidate	Votes	%	±%
Labour Co-op	Jan Rochford	1,333	48.0	+6.6
Independent	Geoff Ainsworth*	439	15.8	N/A
Liberal Democrats	John Deas	406	14.6	−30.4
Conservative	Christopher Davies	377	13.6	+0.0
Green	Andy Olsen	222	8.0	N/A
Majority		894		
Turnout		2,799	33.3	
Labour Co-op gain from Liberal Democrats		Swing		

=== May 2010 ===
2010
Party	Candidate	Votes	%	±%
Labour Co-op	Ronnie Wilson	1,884	41.8	+13.9
Liberal Democrats	John Deas*	1,623	36.0	−16.5
Conservative	Christopher Davies	941	20.9	+1.3
Majority		261	5.8	−18.8
Turnout		4,510	55.3	+25.9
Labour gain from Liberal Democrats		Swing		

== Elections in 2000s ==
2008
Party	Candidate	Votes	%	±%
Liberal Democrats	Janice Heywood	1,282	52.5	+7.5
Labour Co-op	Tony Harold	682	27.9	−13.4
Conservative	Heather Grant	478	19.6	+6.0
Majority		600	24.6	
Turnout			29.4	
Liberal Democrats hold		Swing		

2007
Party	Candidate	Votes	%	±%
Liberal Democrats	Geoffrey Ainsworth*	1,086	45.0	
Labour	Stephen Race	997	41.4	
Conservative	Hilary Brunyee	328	13.6	
Majority		89		
Turnout		2,411	29.5	
Liberal Democrats hold		Swing		

2006
Party	Candidate	Votes	%	±%
Liberal Democrats	John Deas	1,003	44.9	
Labour	Stephen Race	888	39.7	
Conservative	Jonathan Thomason	345	15.4	
Majority		115	5.2	
Turnout		2,236	28.9	−8.5
Liberal Democrats hold		Swing		

2004
Party	Candidate	Votes	%	±%
Liberal Democrats	Janice Heywood	1,298		
Liberal Democrats	Geoffrey Ainsworth	1,264		
Liberal Democrats	Rick Powell	1,158		
Labour	James Harold	916		
Labour	Bernadette Wright	907		
Labour	Stephen Coen	796		
Conservative	Nicholas Wakefield	538		
Turnout		6,877	37.4	
Liberal Democrats win (new seat)				
Liberal Democrats win (new seat)				
Liberal Democrats win (new seat)				
