= 2014 Salford City Council election =

2014 English local government election

Map of the results of the 2014 Salford council election. Labour in red and Conservatives in blue.

The 2014 Salford City Council election took place on 22 May 2014 to elect members of Salford City Council in England. This was on the same day as other local elections.

The composition of the Council following the 2014 elections:

Party	Seats	±
Labour	52	0
Conservative	8	0

== Ward results ==
Asterisks denote incumbent Councillors seeking re-election.

=== Barton ward ===
Barton
Party	Candidate	Votes	%	±%
Labour	David Henry Jolley	1,534	61.0	
Conservative	Hilary Brunyee	498	19.8	
TUSC	Susan Katrina Wright	484	19.2	
Majority		1036	41.2	
Turnout		2516		
Labour hold		Swing		

=== Boothstown & Ellenbrook ward ===
Boothstown and Ellenbrook
Party	Candidate	Votes	%	±%
Conservative	Jillian Collinson*	1,117	42.1	
Labour	Mike Pevitt	723	27.3	
UKIP	David Wibberley	554	20.9	
Green	Diana Joy Battersby	258	9.7	
Majority		394	14.9	
Turnout		2,652		
Conservative hold		Swing		

=== Broughton ward ===
Broughton
Party	Candidate	Votes	%	±%
Labour	John Merry*	1,662	59.9	
UKIP	Chavi Odze	685	24.7	
Green	David Jones	189	6.8	
Conservative	Glenis Purcell	183	6.6	
TUSC	Alan Paul Metcalfe	57	2.1	
Majority		977	35.2	
Turnout		2,776		
Labour hold		Swing		

=== Cadishead ward ===
Cadishead
Party	Candidate	Votes	%	±%
Labour	Christine Hudson	1,353	65.6	+33.5
Conservative	Dorothy Chapman	519	21.1	
BNP	Brenda Leather	397	16.2	
TUSC	Diane Natalie Cawood	187	7.6	
Majority		834	34.0	
Turnout		2456		
Labour hold		Swing		

=== Claremont ward ===
Claremont
Party	Candidate	Votes	%	±%
Labour	Sareda Dirir	1,230	41.9	
UKIP	Mary Ferrer	904	30.8	
Conservative	Bob Goodall	446	15.2	
Green	Rene Iacopini	163	5.5	
Liberal Democrats	Ronnie Benjamin	142	4.8	
TUSC	Matthew David Kilsby	52	1.8	
Majority		326	11.1	
Turnout		2,937	34.91	
Labour hold		Swing		

=== Eccles ward ===
Eccles
Party	Candidate	Votes	%	±%
Labour	Michael Joseph Wheeler	1,861	62.6	
Conservative	Julie Fensome	827	27.8	
Liberal Democrats	Val Kelly	287	9.6	
Majority		1034	34.8	
Turnout		2975		
Labour hold		Swing		

=== Irlam ward ===
Irlam
Party	Candidate	Votes	%	±%
Labour Co-op	Roger Jones	1,177	56.4	
Conservative	Noel Gaskell	393	18.8	
Reality Party	Jackie Anderson	370	17.7	
Independent	Glenn Croston	147	7.0	
Majority		784	37.6	
Turnout		2087		
Labour Co-op hold		Swing		

=== Irwell Riverside ward ===
Irwell Riverside
Party	Candidate	Votes	%	±%
Labour	Jane Elizabeth Hamilton	1,044	49.3	
UKIP	Janice Taylor	464	21.9	
Green	Emma Sarah Louise Van Dyke	233	11.0	
Conservative	Helen Vaudrey	194	9.2	
TUSC	Graham Cooper	110	5.2	
BNP	Gary Tumulty	73	3.4	
Majority		580	27.4	
Turnout		2118		
Labour hold		Swing		

=== Kersal ward ===
Kersal
Party	Candidate	Votes	%	±%
Labour	Ann-Marie Humphreys	1,549	54.7	
UKIP	Shneur Zalman Odze	781	27.6	
Conservative	Christopher Davies	504	17.8	
Majority		768	27.1	
Turnout		2834		
Labour hold		Swing		

=== Langworthy ward ===
Langworthy
Party	Candidate	Votes	%	±%
Labour	John David Warmisham	1,250	57.9	
UKIP	Andy Olsen	884	40.9	
Conservative	Arnold Saunders	207	9.6	
BNP	Kay Pollitt	86	4.0	
Motorcycle Alliance Party	Mike Yarwood	50	2.3	
Majority		366	17.0	
Turnout		2,159	22.8	−2.1
Labour hold		Swing		

=== Little Hulton ward ===
Little Hulton
Party	Candidate	Votes	%	±%
Labour	Eric Burgoyne	1,331	60.7	
TUSC	Terry Simmons	460	21.0	
Conservative	Alexandra Paterson	401	18.3	
Majority		871	39.7	
Turnout		2192		
Labour hold		Swing		

=== Ordsall ward ===
Ordsall
Party	Candidate	Votes	%	±%
Labour	Tanya Burch	1,468	55.4	
Green	Jim Alayo-Arnabat	518	19.6	
Conservative	Nicolette Turner	457	17.3	
TUSC	Sally Griffiths	206	7.8	
Majority		950	35.9	
Turnout		2649		
Labour hold		Swing		

=== Pendlebury ward ===
Pendlebury
Party	Candidate	Votes	%	±%
Labour	Bernard James Lea	1,360	49.2	
UKIP	Paul Frank Doyle	872	31.5	
Conservative	James William Ian Macdonald	410	14.8	
BNP	Eddy O'Sullivan	122	4.4	
Majority		488	17.7	
Turnout		2764		
Labour hold		Swing		

=== Swinton North ward ===
Swinton North
Party	Candidate	Votes	%	±%
Labour	Bill Hinds	1,336	49.5	
UKIP	Glyn Alan Wright	770	28.5	
Conservative	Sharon Bulmer	479	17.7	
English Democrat	Paul Officer	115	4.3	
Majority		566	21.0	
Turnout		2700		
Labour hold		Swing		

=== Swinton South ward ===
Swinton South
Party	Candidate	Votes	%	±%
Labour	Howard Saul Balkind	1,004	41.5	
UKIP	Joe O'Neill	874	36.1	
Conservative	Anne Broomhead	435	18.0	
TUSC	Steve Cullen	108	4.5	
Majority		130	5.4	
Turnout		2421		
Labour hold		Swing		

=== Walkden North ward ===
Walkden North
Party	Candidate	Votes	%	±%
Labour Co-op	Adrian Brocklehurst*	1,144	48.6	−2.3
UKIP	Bernard Gill	717	30.5	N/A
Conservative	Daniel Hill	261	11.1	−10.8
Green	Tom Dylan	116	4.9	N/A
English Democrat	Laurence Depares	84	3.6	−6.1
Independent	Paul Stephen Woodburn	31	1.3	N/A
Majority		427	18.1	−10.9
Turnout				
Labour hold		Swing	-2.3	

=== Walkden South ward ===
Walkden South
Party	Candidate	Votes	%	±%
Conservative	Les Turner*	1,186	38	+0.1
Labour	Robert Andrew Sharpe	1,105	35.5	+1.5
UKIP	Albert Redshaw	626	20.1	N/A
Green	Matthew J R Clark	145	4.7	N/A
English Democrat	Paul Whitelegg	55	1.8	−2
Majority		81	2.6	−1.3
Turnout				
Conservative hold		Swing		

=== Weaste & Seedley ward ===
Weaste and Seedley
Party	Candidate	Votes	%	±%
Labour Co-op	Ronnie Wilson	1,401	57.0	
Conservative	Adam Kennaugh	578	23.4	
TUSC	Paul Quinn	486	19.7	
Majority		823	33.4	
Turnout		2465		
Labour Co-op hold		Swing		

=== Winton ward ===
Winton
Party	Candidate	Votes	%	±%
Labour	Margaret Morris	1,363	52.1	
Independent	Paul Doyle	527	20.1	
Conservative	Andrew Darlington	405	15.5	
BNP	Wayne Tomlinson	323	8.9	
Majority		836	31.9	
Turnout		2618		
Labour hold		Swing		

=== Worsley ward ===
Worsley
Party	Candidate	Votes	%	±%
Conservative	Graham Compton*	1,520	48.9	−4.3
Labour	Amy Coffey	718	23.1	−3.8
UKIP	Andrew Townsend	609	19.6	N/A
Green	Christopher Bertenshow	262	8.4	N/A
Majority		802	28.8	−27.4
Turnout				
Conservative hold		Swing		
