= 2010 Salford City Council election =

2010 UK local government election

Results of the 2010 Salford City Council election

The 2010 Salford City Council election took place on 6 May 2010 to elect members of Salford City Council in England. One third of the council was up for election. This was on the same day as other local elections. The Labour Party gained three seats and stayed in overall control of the council.

The composition of the Council following the 2010 elections:

Party	Seats	±
Labour	39	+3
Conservative	13	0
Liberal Democrat	5	–2
Community Action	2	-1
Independent	1	0

== Ward results ==
=== Barton ward ===
Barton
Party	Candidate	Votes	%	±%
Labour	David Jolley*	2,145	48.1	+7.1
Conservative	Anthony Yates	1,048	23.5	−4.2
Liberal Democrats	Ronald Benjamin	940	21.1	+1.8
Independent	Alan Valentine	310	6.9	−5.1
Majority		1,097	24.6	+11.3
Turnout		4,464	51.7	+23.3
Labour hold		Swing		

=== Boothstown And Ellenbrook ward ===
Boothstown and Ellenbrook
Party	Candidate	Votes	%	±%
Conservative	Jillian Collinson	2,583	49.9	−17.8
Labour	Stephen Ord	1,536	29.7	+13.8
Liberal Democrats	Sheila Mulleady	1,029	19.9	+3.5
Majority		1,047	20.2	−31.1
Turnout		5,174	68.3	+32.1
Conservative hold		Swing		

=== Broughton ward ===
Broughton
Party	Candidate	Votes	%	±%
Labour	John Merry*	2,130	57.5	−0.6
Liberal Democrats	Bernard Carson	897	24.2	+1.1
Conservative	Gary Green	632	17.0	−1.8
Majority		1,233	33.3	−1.7
Turnout		3,707	47.7	+21.3
Labour hold		Swing		

=== Cadishead ward ===
Cadishead
Party	Candidate	Votes	%	±%
Labour	Christine Hudson	2,014	46.5	+14.4
Conservative	Tony Kelly	1,267	29.2	−9.7
Liberal Democrats	Jennifer Carr	679	15.7	+10.9
BNP	Colin Ward	346	8.0	+8.0
Majority		747	17.2	+10.4
Turnout		4,334	56.9	+20.0
Labour hold		Swing		

=== Claremont ward ===
Claremont
Party	Candidate	Votes	%	±%
Labour	Sareda Dirir	1,837	36.3	+11.6
Liberal Democrats	Mary Ferrer*	1,783	35.3	−7.5
Conservative	Hilary Brunyee	887	17.5	−0.1
BNP	Martin Jackson	386	7.6	−2.3
Independent	Robert Wakefield	143	2.8	+2.8
Majority		54	1.1	−17.0
Turnout		5,056	62.6	+26.4
Labour gain from Liberal Democrats		Swing		

=== Eccles ward ===
Eccles
Party	Candidate	Votes	%	±%
Labour	John Cullen	2,216	41.1	+3.5
Conservative	Abdul Mannan	1,625	30.2	−16.5
Liberal Democrats	Valerie Kelly	1,298	24.1	+8.4
Independent	Tim Perkins	214	4.0	+4.0
Majority		591	11.0	+1.9
Turnout		5,387	61.7	+25.5
Labour hold		Swing		

=== Irlam ward ===
Irlam
Party	Candidate	Votes	%	±%
Labour Co-op	Roger Jones	1,791	44.0	+20.7
Conservative	Chris Bates	1,095	26.9	−2.9
Liberal Democrats	Katriona Middleton	663	16.3	+10.5
Independent	Mark Armstrong	500	12.3	+12.3
Majority		696	17.1	+5.7
Turnout		4,069	56.4	+18.0
Labour hold		Swing		

=== Irwell Riverside ward ===
Irwell Riverside
Party	Candidate	Votes	%	±%
Labour	Matt Mold*	1,790	44.9	−6.0
Liberal Democrats	Damien Shannon	1,070	26.9	+7.6
Conservative	Christine Yates	492	12.3	−4.1
BNP	Gary Tumulty	409	10.3	−3.1
Green	Rob Mitchell	195	4.9	+4.9
Majority		720	18.1	−13.5
Turnout		3,985	43.5	+22.9
Labour hold		Swing		

=== Kersal ward ===
Kersal
Party	Candidate	Votes	%	±%
Labour	Ann-Marie Humphreys*	2,028	45.0	−4.7
Conservative	David Wolfson	1,645	36.5	−1.0
Liberal Democrats	Harold Kershner	499	11.1	−1.7
BNP	Brenda Leather	217	4.8	+4.8
Respect	Alice Searle	97	2.2	+2.2
Majority		383	8.5	−3.7
Turnout		4,508	56.3	+21.9
Labour hold		Swing		

=== Langworthy ward ===
Langworthy
Party	Candidate	Votes	%	±%
Labour	John Warmisham*	1,888	43.6	+4.7
Liberal Democrats	Steve Middleton	1,211	28.0	−18.5
Conservative	George Darlington	572	13.2	−1.4
BNP	Edward O'Sullivan	505	11.7	+11.7
Independent	Jacquie O'Toole	123	2.8	+2.8
Majority		677	15.6	+8.0
Turnout		4,329	47.2	+22.3
Labour hold		Swing		

=== Little Hulton ward ===
Little Hulton
Party	Candidate	Votes	%	±%
Labour	Eric Burgoyne*	2,260	55.7	+8.9
Liberal Democrats	David Cowpe	898	22.2	+9.8
Conservative	Con Wright	852	21.0	−1.4
Majority		1,362	33.6	+9.2
Turnout		4,054	45.4	+21.0
Labour hold		Swing		

=== Ordsall ward ===
Ordsall
Party	Candidate	Votes	%	±%
Labour	Alan Clague*	1,609	41.7	−13.2
Liberal Democrats	Marion Croucher	1,198	31.0	+8.8
Conservative	Chris Clarkson	773	20.0	−2.9
TUSC	Andrew Behan	255	6.6	+6.6
Majority		411	10.6	−21.4
Turnout		3,863	50.2	+26.8
Labour hold		Swing		

=== Pendlebury ward ===
Pendlebury
Party	Candidate	Votes	%	±%
Labour	Bernard Lea*	2,259	43.9	+7.0
Conservative	Keyth Scoles	1,102	21.4	−9.8
Liberal Democrats	Valerie Gregory	1,042	20.3	+6.1
BNP	Wayne Taylor	566	11.0	−2.3
Independent	Stuart Cremins	80	1.6	−2.8
Independent	Reg Howard	69	1.3	+1.3
Majority		1,157	22.5	+16.8
Turnout		5,143	57.5	+27.9
Labour hold		Swing		

=== Swinton North ward ===
Swinton North
Party	Candidate	Votes	%	±%
Labour	Bill Hinds*	2,420	48.2	+6.5
Liberal Democrats	Tamara Cooke	1,104	22.0	−1.2
Conservative	Shneur Odze	945	18.8	−16.4
BNP	John Leach	555	11.0	+11.0
Majority		1,316	26.2	+19.7
Turnout		5,024	58.6	+27.3
Labour hold		Swing		

=== Swinton South ward ===
Swinton South
Party	Candidate	Votes	%	±%
Labour	Howard Balkind	1,671	33.7	+9.6
Liberal Democrats	Paul Gregory	1,358	27.4	−15.7
Conservative	Chris Allcock	1,055	21.3	+1.5
Independent	Joe O'Neill*	837	16.9	+16.9
Majority		313	6.3	−12.7
Turnout		4,954	60.0	+27.7
Labour gain from Independent		Swing		

=== Walkden North ward ===
Walkden North
Party	Candidate	Votes	%	±%
Labour Co-op	Adrian Brocklehurst	2,231	50.7	+3.4
Conservative	Stephen Birch	960	21.8	−12.8
Liberal Democrats	Susan Carson	764	17.4	−0.7
English Democrat	Laurence Depares	424	9.6	+9.6
Majority		1,271	28.9	+16.2
Turnout		4,398	52.1	+26.1
Labour hold		Swing		

=== Walkden South ward ===
Walkden South
Party	Candidate	Votes	%	±%
Conservative	Les Turner*	2,026	37.7	−12.9
Labour	Brendan Ryan	1,815	33.8	+8.8
Liberal Democrats	Pauline Ogden	1,015	18.9	+4.8
BNP	Tommy Cavanagh	285	5.3	−5.0
English Democrat	Paul Whitelegg	203	3.8	+3.8
Majority		211	3.9	−21.7
Turnout		5,373	66.7	+26.4
Conservative hold		Swing		

=== Weaste & Seedley ward ===
Weaste and Seedley
Party	Candidate	Votes	%	±%
Labour Co-op	Ronnie Wilson	1,884	41.8	+13.9
Liberal Democrats	John Deas*	1,623	36.0	−16.5
Conservative	Christopher Davies	941	20.9	+1.3
Majority		261	5.8	−18.8
Turnout		4,510	55.3	+25.9
Labour gain from Liberal Democrats		Swing		

=== Winton ward ===
Winton
Party	Candidate	Votes	%	±%
Labour	Margaret Morris*	1,872	41.4	+5.1
Conservative	Anne Broomhead	949	21.0	−1.4
Liberal Democrats	Matthew Drake	726	16.1	+2.1
Independent	Paul Doyle	630	13.9	−3.9
BNP	Tommy Williams	316	7.0	−2.5
Majority		923	20.4	+6.5
Turnout		4,519	52.7	+22.1
Labour hold		Swing		

=== Worsley ward ===
Worsley
Party	Candidate	Votes	%	±%
Conservative	Graham Compton*	3,065	52.8	−16.7
Labour	Michelle Mullen	1,552	26.7	+9.9
Liberal Democrats	Christine Corry	1,146	19.7	+6.0
Majority		1,513	26.0	−26.7
Turnout		5,810	71.3	+29.2
Conservative hold		Swing		
