= Barton upon Irwell =

Suburb in Greater Manchester, England

Coordinates: 53.476°N 2.360°W

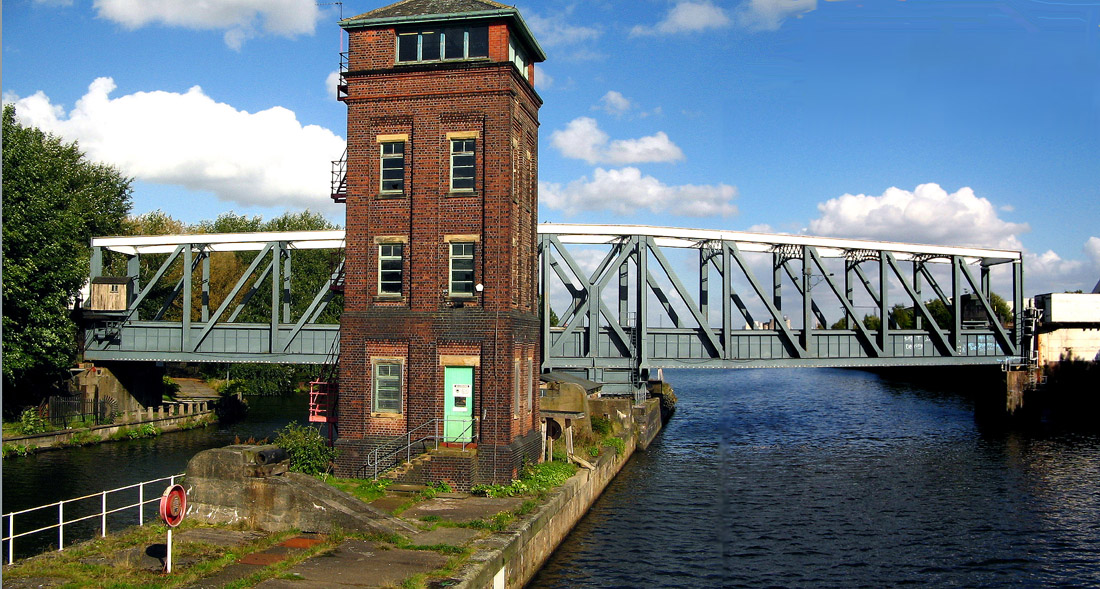
- The Barton Swing Aqueduct carries the Bridgewater Canal over the Manchester Ship Canal.

- Location within Greater Manchester
- Population: 12,462 (2001 Census)
- OS grid reference: SJ762978
- Metropolitan borough: Salford
- Metropolitan county: Greater Manchester
- Region: North West
- Country: England
- Sovereign state: United Kingdom
- Post town: MANCHESTER
- Postcode district: M30
- Dialling code: 0161
- Police: Greater Manchester
- Fire: Greater Manchester
- Ambulance: North West
- UK Parliament: Worsley and Eccles
- Councillors: David Jolley (Labour); Michele Barnes (Labour); John Mullen (Labour)

Barton upon Irwell (also known as Barton-on-Irwell or Barton) is a suburb of Salford, in Greater Manchester, England, with a population of 12,462 in 2014.

== History ==
Barton Old Hall, a brick-built house degraded to a farmhouse, was the seat of the Barton, Booth and Leigh families. The church of St Catherine, built in stone with an octagonal spire rising to 100 feet (30 m), was consecrated in 1843. The church was demolished in the 1970s due to dry rot and the parish was merged with the neighbouring church of St Michael & All Angels, Peel Green.

== Governance ==
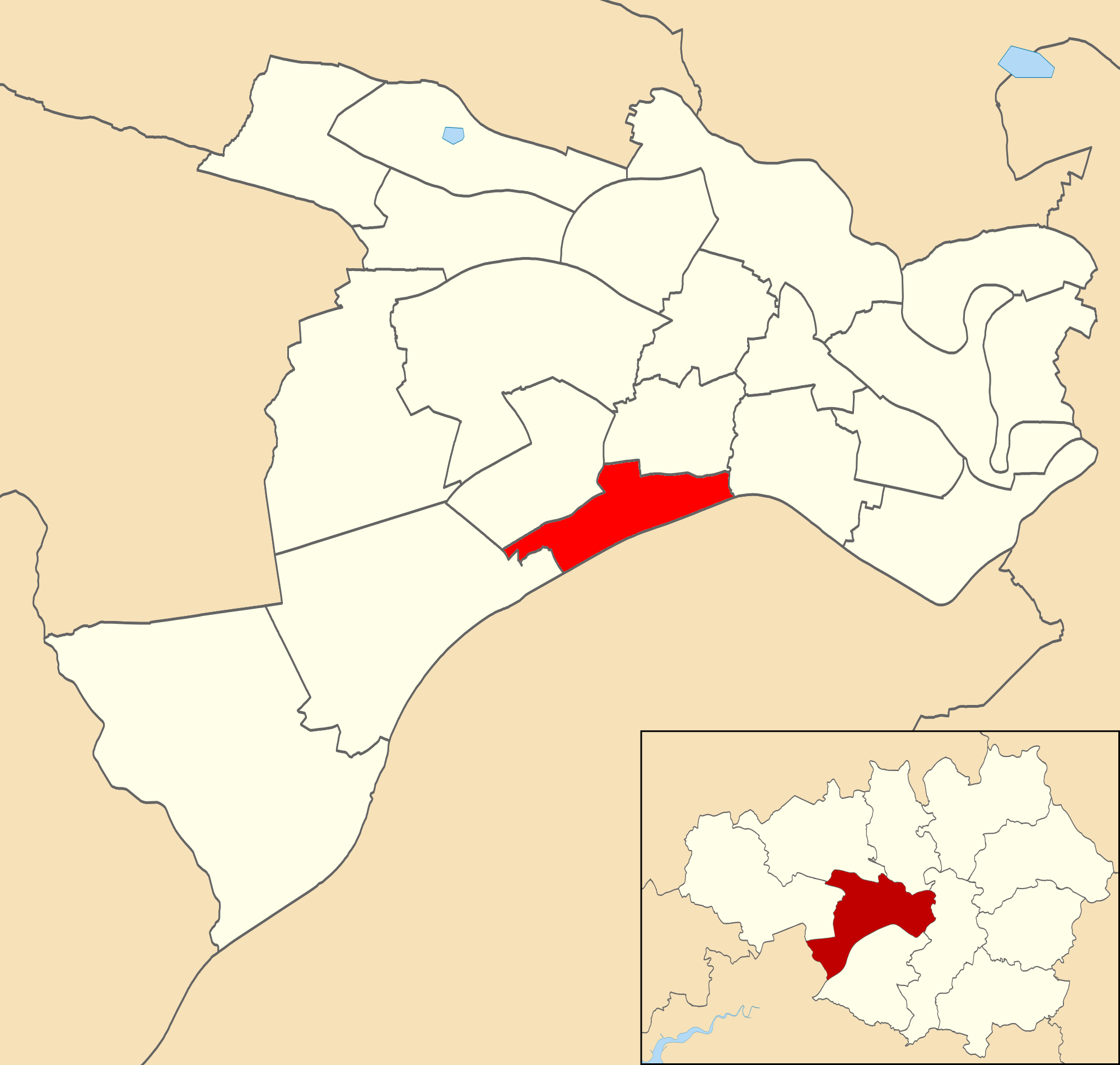
Barton electoral ward within Salford City Council.

Within the boundaries of the historic county of Lancashire. Barton upon Irwell is currently represented in Westminster by Barbara Keeley MP for Worsley and Eccles South.

Barton-upon-Irwell was formerly a township in the parish of Eccles and a chapelry, in the hundred of Salford. In 1866 Barton upon Irwell became a separate civil parish, in 1894 the parish was abolished and merged with Eccles, Irlam, Davyhulme, Barton Moss and Pendleton. In 1891 the parish had a population of 35,826. Barton was joined with the municipal borough of Eccles in 1933 which was at the time part of the Lancashire administrative county. Eccles joined the City of Salford, Greater Manchester in 1974.

=== Councillors ===
From 2004 to 2021 the area was represented on Salford City Council by three councillors serving the ward of Barton.

Election	Councillor	Councillor	Councillor
2004	David Jolley (Lab)	Neville Clarke (Lab)	John Mullen (Lab)
2006	David Jolley (Lab)	Neville Clarke (Lab)	John Mullen (Lab)
2007	David Jolley (Lab)	Norbert Potter (Lab)	John Mullen (Lab)
2008	David Jolley (Lab)	Norbert Potter (Lab)	John Mullen (Lab)
2010	David Jolley (Lab)	Norbert Potter (Lab)	John Mullen (Lab)
2011	David Jolley (Lab)	Michele Barnes (Lab)	John Mullen (Lab)
2012	David Jolley (Lab)	Michele Barnes (Lab)	John Mullen (Lab)
2014	David Jolley (Lab)	Michele Barnes (Lab)	John Mullen (Lab)
2015	David Jolley (Lab)	Michele Barnes (Lab)	John Mullen (Lab)
2016	David Jolley (Lab)	Michele Barnes (Lab)	John Mullen (Lab)
2018	David Jolley (Lab)	Michele Barnes (Lab)	John Mullen (Lab)
2019	David Jolley (Lab)	Michele Barnes (Lab)	John Mullen (Lab)
2021	Ward abolished		

indicates seat up for re-election.

Boundary changes coming in to effect at the 2021 Salford City Council election abolished the Barton ward and the Barton and Winton ward was created in its place.

== Geography ==
Barton is about 5.5 miles (8.9 km) west of Manchester, on both banks of the River Irwell from Trafford Park to Davyhulme, and includes the hamlet of Dumplington, now the site of the Trafford Centre. The Irwell was the boundary as far as the River Mersey, which with the Glazebrook were also boundaries.

== Religion ==
The Lords of the Manor; the de Traffords were Roman Catholics and the Grade I listed All Saints' Church was built at their expense between 1865 and 1868 by Edward Welby Pugin. It ceased to be a parish church in 1961 and was taken over by the Friars Minor Conventual. Land for its graveyard given by the de Traffords is on the far side of the ship canal.

The de Traffords believed in religious freedom and paid for churches and chapels of other denominations. Between 1865 and 1868, the Church of England St Catherine's Church was built at their expense to the rear of All Saints' Church. It was demolished in the late 1970s. The graveyard remains and is the last resting place of Marshall Stevens.

Barton upon Irwell Methodist Chapel, built in 1796, was a short distance from the bridge. The buildings were taken over in 1973 by the Church of the Nazarene, but were later abandoned and demolished in 2001 for housing, causing controversy over the treatment of the graveyard by the developers.

== Transport ==
Barton is on the north bank of the Manchester Ship Canal and the River Irwell. A pair of ship locks is on the western edge of the district. It is also home to Barton Swing Aqueduct, which carries the Bridgewater Canal over the Manchester Ship Canal. From the late 19th century, the road from Barton to Stretford was carried over the canal by a low-level swing bridge, the opening of which for shipping to pass caused lengthy traffic delays to vehicles.

Before the Manchester Ship Canal was built, the Bridgewater Canal crossed the Irwell by a stone aqueduct of three arches, which was the first constructed in England over a navigable river.

The Liverpool and Manchester Railway, opened in 1830, passes through the township. Barton Aerodrome was opened on 1 January 1930 and was the first permanent municipal airfield in the United Kingdom. Scheduled internal passenger flights operated in 1930 and again from 1934 to 1938, when the services were transferred to the new larger Ringway Airport (now Manchester Airport). Several charter airlines and flying clubs were based at the airport prewar.

During the Second World War over 700 aircraft were built here by F. Hills & Son and over 1,000 military aircraft were repaired by several firms. In 1946, the Lancashire Aero Club, founded in 1924 and the oldest flying club in the UK, moved here from Woodford Aerodrome, Cheshire. Barton is now a thriving general aviation airfield owned by Peel Holdings and is the base for over 150 private and club aircraft.

== Culture and cultural references ==
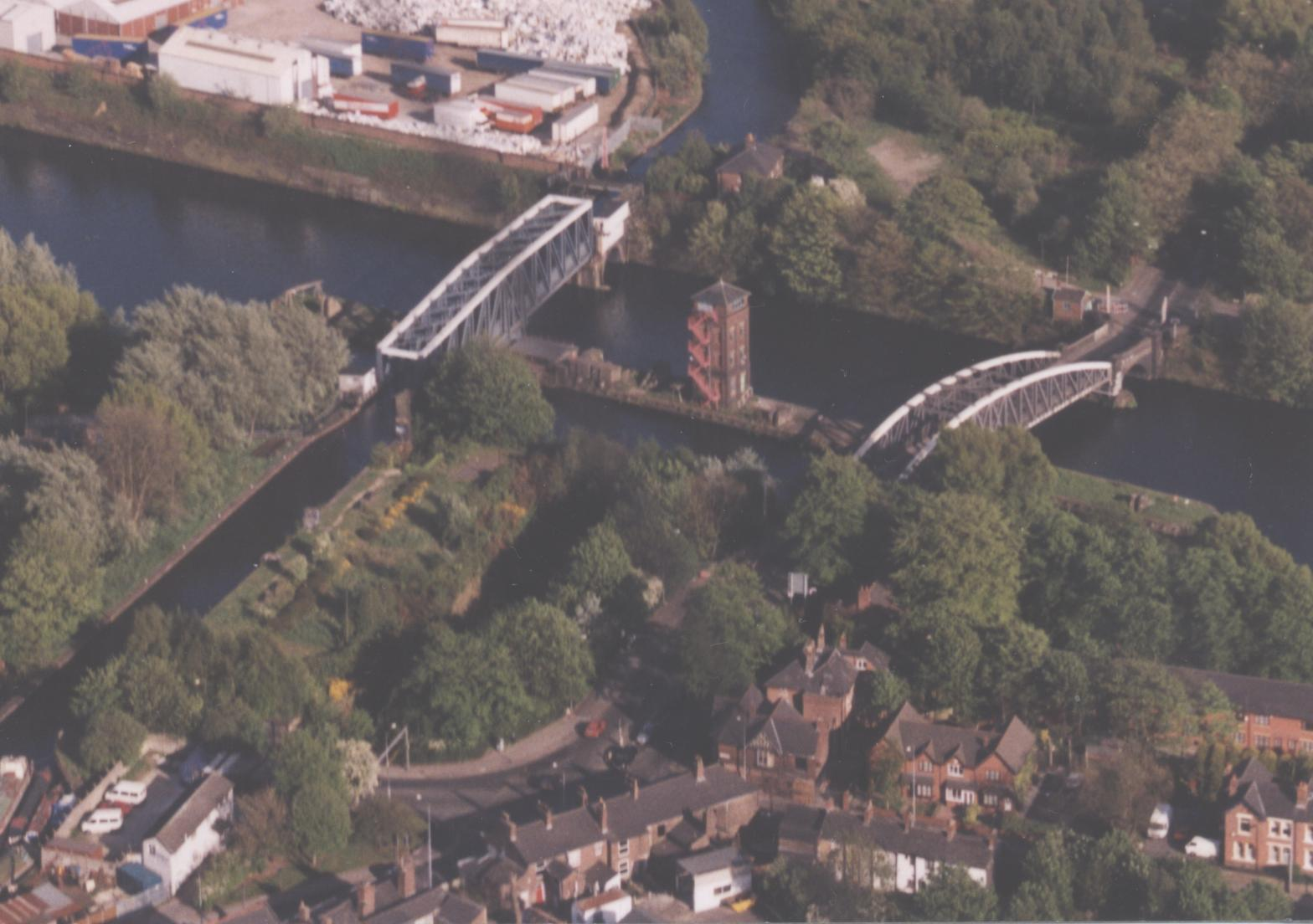
The SW portion of Barton showing the Bridgewater Aqueduct (left) and the road swing-bridge (right) crossing the Ship Canal, with adjacent housing

Featured in the last scene of the 1961 film A Taste of Honey, the Barton Aqueduct and Swing Bridge are seen as the character of Tom sails away. In the film's opening scenes of street life in Salford, two young children are seen playing. One of them, the 5-year-old Hazel Blears, grew up to become the Member of Parliament for Salford and a Cabinet Minister. Whilst the Barton Swing Bridge does feature in the 1961 film A Taste of Honey, the scene featuring Tom the sailor on the rotating bridge is in fact the Trafford Road Swing Bridge – in the background of the shot the now demolished Henshaw's Blind Asylum can be seen as the bridge turntable shifts.

== Sport ==
The 12,000-capacity AJ Bell Stadium, home ground of Salford Red Devils Rugby League and Sale Sharks Rugby Union, opened in 2012.
