= Claremont (ward) =

- Electoral ward
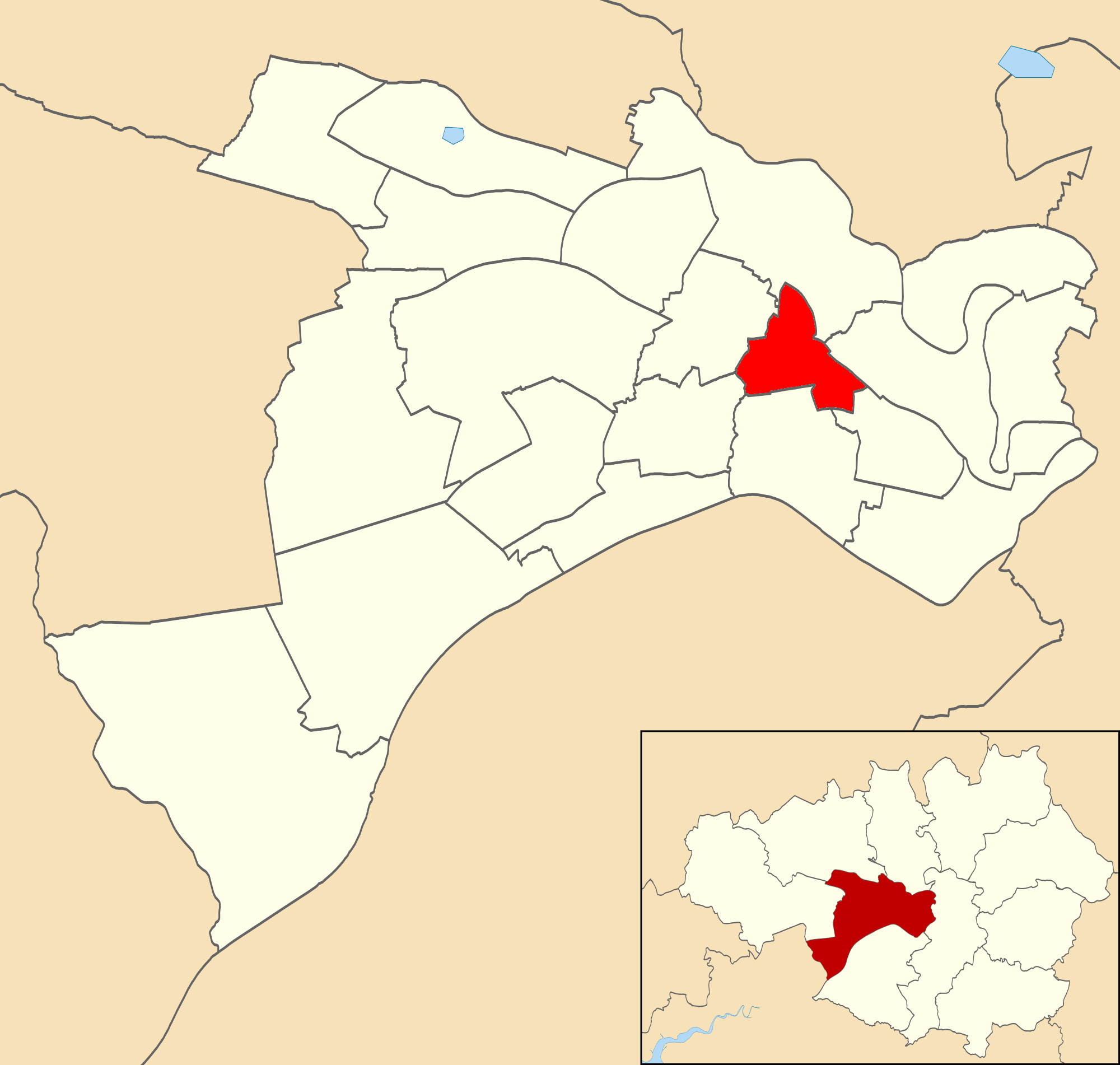
- Claremont ward within Salford City Council.

- Coat of arms
- Motto: Let the good (or safety) of the people be the supreme (or highest) law
- Interactive map of Claremont
- Coordinates: 53.4995°N 2.3149°W
- Country: United Kingdom
- Constituent country: England
- Region: North West England
- County: Greater Manchester
- Metropolitan borough: Salford
- Created: May 2004
- Named after: Claremont

Government UK Parliament constituency: Salford
  - Type: Unicameral
  - Body: Salford City Council
  - Mayor of Salford: Paul Dennett (Labour)
  - Councillor: Christopher Bates (Reform)
  - Councillor: Mike Pevitt (Labour)
  - Councillor: Barbara Bentham (Labour)

Population
  - Total: 13,241
- Website: https://www.salford.gov.uk
- Ward profile conducted by Salford City Council in 2021

Claremont is an electoral ward of Salford, England. It is represented in Westminster by Rebecca Long-Bailey MP for Salford. A profile of the ward conducted by Salford City Council in 2021 recorded a population of 13,241.

== Councillors ==
The ward is represented by three councillors: Christopher Bates (Ref UK), Mike Pevitt (Lab), and Barbara Bentham (Lab).

Election	Councillor	Councillor	Councillor
2004	Stephen Cooke (Lib Dem)	Timothy Perkins (Lib Dem)	Norman Owen (Lib Dem)
2006	Margaret Ferrer (Lib Dem)	Timothy Perkins (Lib Dem)	Norman Owen (Lib Dem)
2007	Margaret Ferrer (Lib Dem)	Janice Taylor (Lib Dem)	Norman Owen (Lib Dem)
2008	Margaret Ferrer (Lib Dem)	Janice Taylor (Lib Dem)	Norman Owen (Lib Dem)
2010	Sareda Dirir (Lab)	Janice Taylor (Lib Dem)	Norman Owen (Lib Dem)
2011	Sareda Dirir (Lab)	Joseph Johnson (Lab)	Norman Owen (Lib Dem)
2012	Sareda Dirir (Lab)	Joseph Johnson (Lab)	Sue Pugh (Lab)
2014	Sareda Dirir (Lab)	Joseph Johnson (Lab)	Sue Pugh (Lab)
2015	Sareda Dirir (Lab)	Joe Murphy (Lab)	Sue Pugh (Lab)
2016	Sareda Dirir (Lab)	Joe Murphy (Lab)	Barbara Bentham (Lab)
By-election; 8 June 2017	Neil Reynolds (Lab)	Joe Murphy (Lab)	Barbara Bentham (Lab)
By-election; 5 October 2017	Neil Reynolds (Lab)	Mike Pevitt (Lab)	Barbara Bentham (Lab)
2018	Neil Reynolds (Lab)	Mike Pevitt (Lab)	Barbara Bentham (Lab)
2019	Neil Reynolds (Lab)	Mike Pevitt (Lab)	Barbara Bentham (Lab)
2021	Neil Reynolds (Lab)	Mike Pevitt (Lab)	Barbara Bentham (Lab)
2022	Neil Reynolds (Lab)	Mike Pevitt (Lab)	Barbara Bentham (Lab)
2023	Neil Reynolds (Lab)	Mike Pevitt (Lab)	Barbara Bentham (Lab)
2024	Neil Reynolds (Lab)	Mike Pevitt (Lab)	Barbara Bentham (Lab)
2026	Christopher Bates (Ref UK)	Mike Pevitt (Lab)	Barbara Bentham (Lab)

indicates seat up for re-election. indicates seat won in by-election.

== Elections in 2020s ==
=== May 2026 ===
2026
Party	Candidate	Votes	%	±%
Reform	Christopher Bates	1,497	37.9	N/A
Labour	Neil Reynolds	1,262	32.0	−34.5
Green	Frederick Seed	732	18.6	+3.3
Conservative	Janet West	234	5.9	−2.3
Liberal Democrats	Ian McKinlay	209	5.3	−3.2
Rejected ballots		8	0.2	-1.2
Turnout		3,942	40.0	+9.7
Registered electors		9,853		
Reform gain from Labour				

=== May 2024 ===
2024
Party	Candidate	Votes	%	±%
Labour	Barbara Bentham*	1,991	66.5	+5.0
Green	Christopher Seed	458	15.3	+3.2
Liberal Democrats	Ian McKinlay	255	8.5	−2.2
Conservative	Alima Husain	245	8.2	−7.0
Rejected ballots		43	1.4	
Majority		1533	51.2	
Turnout		2992	30.3	
Registered electors		9,860		
Labour hold		Swing		

=== May 2023 ===
2023
Party	Candidate	Votes	%	±%
Labour	Michael Thomas Pevitt*	1,606	61.5	+3.9
Conservative	Myrella Saunders	397	15.2	+1.1
Green	Christopher Seed	316	12.1	+2.4
Liberal Democrats	Ian Alexander McKinlay	279	10.7	+4.0
Majority		1,209	46.3	
Rejected ballots		12	0.5	
Turnout		2,610	26.8	
Registered electors		9,748		
Labour hold		Swing		

=== May 2022 ===
2022
Party	Candidate	Votes	%	±%
Labour	Neil Reynolds*	1,599	57.6	+3.3
Conservative	Bernard Goldfine	391	14.1	−1.7
Independent	Mary Ferrar	315	11.3	−2.3
Green	Christopher Seed	269	9.7	−6.0
Liberal Democrats	Gizella Hughes	186	6.7	−8.5
Majority		1,208	43.5	
Turnout		2,776	28.3	−4.0
Registered electors		9,814		
Labour hold		Swing		

=== May 2021 ===
2021
Party	Candidate	Votes	%	±%
Labour	Barbara Bentham	1,745	54.3	N/A
Labour	Michael Pevitt	1,413	43.9	N/A
Labour	Neil Reynolds	1,372	42.7	N/A
Conservative	Jonathan Grosskopf	507	15.8	N/A
Green	Robert Stephenson	504	15.7	N/A
Liberal Democrats	Jake Overend	489	15.2	N/A
Liberal Democrats	Patricia Murphy	441	13.7	N/A
Independent	Mary Ferrer	438	13.6	N/A
Conservative	Myrella Saunders	427	13.3	N/A
Liberal Democrats	John Grant	414	12.9	N/A
Conservative	Jackie Mountaine	399	12.4	N/A
Turnout		3,216	32.26	N/A
Labour win (new seat)				
Labour win (new seat)				
Labour win (new seat)				

== Elections in 2010s ==
=== May 2019 ===
2019
Party	Candidate	Votes	%	±%
Labour	Michael Thomas Pevitt*	860	34.5	
UKIP	James Miller	409	16.4	
Green	Bryan Blears	379	15.2	
Liberal Democrats	Jake Overend	320	12.8	
Conservative	Jackie Mountaine	290	11.6	
Independent	Mary Ferrer	235	9.4	
Majority		451		
Turnout		2,505	30.36	
Labour hold		Swing		

=== May 2018 ===
2018
Party	Candidate	Votes	%	±%
Labour	Neil Reynolds*	1,167	49.2	
Conservative	Charlotte Woods	473	19.9	
Liberal Democrats	Stef Lorenz	406	17.1	
Independent	Mary Ferrer	200	8.4	
Green	Daniel Towers	117	4.9	
Majority		694	29.4	
Turnout		2,372	28.7	
Labour hold		Swing		

=== October 2017 ===
By-election, October 2017
Party	Candidate	Votes	%	±%
Labour	Mike Pevitt	718	46.50	
Conservative	Charlotte Woods	447	28.95	
Independent	Mary Ferrer	171	11.08	
Liberal Democrats	Stef Lorenz	162	10.49	
Green	Daniel Towers	46	2.98	
Majority		271	17.55	
Turnout		1,550	18.53	
Labour hold		Swing		

=== June 2017 ===
By-election, June 2017
Party	Candidate	Votes	%	±%
Labour	Neil Andrew Reynolds	3,300	61.3	+13.6
Conservative	Charlotte Woods	1,455	27.0	+9.0
Liberal Democrats	Stef Lorenz	319	5.9	+5.9
Green	Daniel Towers	236	4.4	−4.6
The Republic Party	Stuart Cremins	49	0.9	+0.9
Majority		1,845	34.3	+11.1
Turnout		5,384	65	
Labour hold		Swing		

=== May 2016 ===
2016
Party	Candidate	Votes	%	±%
Labour	Barbara Anne Bentham	1,294	47.7	+2.6
UKIP	Mary Ferrer	666	24.6	+2.9
Conservative	Bob Goodall	489	18.0	−1.6
Green	Dane Alexander Yates	245	9.0	+3.1
Majority		628	23.2	−0.2
Turnout		2,712	33.4	−29.4
Labour hold		Swing		

=== May 2015 ===
2015
Party	Candidate	Votes	%	±%
Labour	Joe Murphy*	2,335	45.1	+3.2
UKIP	Mary Ferrer	1,124	21.7	−9.1
Conservative	Bob Goodall	1,014	19.6	+4.4
Liberal Democrats	Ronnie Benjamin	315	6.1	+1.3
Green	Rene Iacopini	305	5.9	+0.4
TUSC	Matt Kilsby	80	1.5	−0.3
Majority		1,221	23.4	+12.3
Turnout		5,173	62.8	
Labour hold		Swing		

=== May 2014 ===
2014
Party	Candidate	Votes	%	±%
Labour	Sareda Dirir	1,230	41.9	
UKIP	Mary Ferrer	904	30.8	
Conservative	Bob Goodall	446	15.2	
Green	Rene Iacopini	163	5.5	
Liberal Democrats	Ronnie Benjamin	142	4.8	
TUSC	Matthew David Kilsby	52	1.8	
Majority		326	11.1	
Turnout		2,937	34.91	
Labour hold		Swing		

=== May 2012 ===
2012
Party	Candidate	Votes	%	±%
Labour	Sue Pugh	1,310	47.5	+22.8
Liberal Democrats	Norman Owen*	697	25.3	−17.5
Conservative	Chris Bates	250	9.1	−8.5
UKIP	Glyn Wright	234	8.5	+3.5
BNP	Eddy O'Sullivan	198	7.2	−2.7
Community Action	Matthew Andrews	69	2.5	N/A
Majority		613	22.2	
Turnout		2,785	34.0	−2.6
Labour gain from Liberal Democrats		Swing		

=== May 2011 ===
2011
Party	Candidate	Votes	%	±%
Labour	Joseph Johnson	1,540	49.8	+17.9
Liberal Democrats	Mary Ferrer	809	26.2	−11.4
Conservative	Nicholas Johnson	460	14.9	−3.7
UKIP	Glyn Wright	282	9.1	N/A
Majority		731		
Turnout		3,115	38.2	
Labour gain from Liberal Democrats		Swing		

=== May 2010 ===
2010
Party	Candidate	Votes	%	±%
Labour	Sareda Dirir	1,837	36.3	+11.6
Liberal Democrats	Mary Ferrer*	1,783	35.3	−7.5
Conservative	Hilary Brunyee	887	17.5	−0.1
BNP	Martin Jackson	386	7.6	−2.3
Independent	Robert Wakefield	143	2.8	+2.8
Majority		54	1.1	−17.0
Turnout		5,056	62.6	+26.4
Labour gain from Liberal Democrats		Swing		

== Elections in 2000s ==
2008
Party	Candidate	Votes	%	±%
Liberal Democrats	Norman Owen	1,277	42.8	+5.2
Labour	Peter Wheeler	737	24.7	−7.2
Conservative	Chris Allcock	525	17.6	−1.0
BNP	Edward O’Sullivan	295	9.9	−2.0
UKIP	Robert Wakefield	149	5.0	N/A
Majority		540	18.1	
Turnout			36.2	
Liberal Democrats hold		Swing		

2007
Party	Candidate	Votes	%	±%
Liberal Democrats	Janice Taylor	995	37.6	
Labour	Peter Wheeler	845	31.9	
Conservative	Tim Perkins	492	18.6	
BNP	Edward O'Sullivan	316	11.9	
Majority		150		
Turnout		2,648	32.7	
Liberal Democrats hold		Swing		

2006
Party	Candidate	Votes	%	±%
Liberal Democrats	Margaret Ferrer	1,162	44.3	
Labour	Peter Wheeler	707	26.9	
BNP	Edward O'Sullivan	424	16.2	
Conservative	Catherine Edwards	331	12.6	
Majority		455	17.4	
Turnout		2,624	33.2	−6.2
Liberal Democrats gain from Independent		Swing		

2004
Party	Candidate	Votes	%	±%
Liberal Democrats	Norman Owen	1,505		
Liberal Democrats	Stephen Cooke	1,166		
Liberal Democrats	Timothy Perkins	1,074		
Labour	Louise Baxter	964		
Labour	Peter Wheeler	848		
Labour	James Short	830		
Conservative	Sydney Cooper	764		
Turnout		7,151	39.4	
Liberal Democrats win (new seat)				
Liberal Democrats win (new seat)				
Liberal Democrats win (new seat)				
