= 2021 Salford City Council election =

Local election in England

← 2019	6 May 2021	2022 →

All of the 60 seats on Salford City Council 31 seats needed for a majority
- Turnout: 28.41%
	First party	Second party	Third party
Party	Labour	Conservative	Liberal Democrats
Last election	51 seats	8 seats	0 seats
Seats won	52	7	1
Seat change	▲1	▼1	▲1
Popular vote	72,135	32,159	6,969
Percentage	57.4%	25.6%	5.5%
- Winner of each seat at the 2021 Salford City Council election
Council control before election
Labour
Subsequent council control
Labour

The 2021 Salford City Council election to elect members of Salford City Council in England took place on 6 May 2021, on the same day as other local elections.

== Boundary changes ==
The Local Government Boundary Commission for England has reported on the Salford Council area and has redrawn the local authority boundaries to create a new ward boundary map

Ward Name	Number of Councillors
Barnton and Winton	3
Blackfrairs and Trinity	3
Boothstown and Ellenbrook	3
Broughton	3
Cadishead and Lower Irlam	3
Claremont	3
Eccles	3
Higher Irlam and Peel Green	3
Kersal and Broughton Park	3
Little Hulton	3
Ordsall	3
Pendlebury and Clifton	3
Pendleton and Charlestown	3
Quays	3
Swinton and Wardley	3
Swinton Park	3
Walkden North	3
Walkden South	3
Weaste and Seedley	3
Worsley and Westwood Park	3

== Results summary ==
2021 Salford City Council election
Party	Seats	Gains	Losses	Net gain/loss	Seats %	Votes %	Votes	+/−
Labour	52	0	0	▲1	86.7	57.4	72,135	
Conservative	7	0	0	▼1	11.7	25.7	32,326	
Liberal Democrats	1	0	0	▲1	1.7	6.3	7,860	
Green	0	0	0	Steady	0.0	6.5	8,139	
Core Independents	0	0	0	Steady	0.0	1.9	2,428	
Independent	0	0	0	Steady	0.0	1.8	2,263	
Women's Equality	0	0	0	Steady	0.0	0.3	342	
TUSC	0	0	0	Steady	0.0	0.1	173	

== Ward results ==
=== Barton and Winton ===
Barton and Winton
Party	Candidate	Votes	%	±%
Labour	Paula Boshell	1,642	61.3	N/A
Labour	David Lancaster	1,410	52.6	N/A
Labour	John Mullen	1,305	48.7	N/A
Conservative	Jacob Barden	496	18.5	N/A
Conservative	Janet Reygan	425	15.9	N/A
Green	Jenna Sayer	417	15.6	N/A
Conservative	Tracey Roberts	404	15.1	N/A
Liberal Democrats	Antony Duke	225	8.4	N/A
Turnout		2,679	25.35	N/A
Labour win (new seat)				
Labour win (new seat)				
Labour win (new seat)				

=== Blackfriars and Trinity ===
Blackfriars and Trinity
Party	Candidate	Votes	%	±%
Labour	Jane Hamilton	1,226	63.1	N/A
Labour	Stephen Coen	1,205	62.0	N/A
Labour	Raymond Walker	946	48.7	N/A
Green	Wendy Olsen	606	31.2	N/A
Green	Christopher Seed	349	18.0	N/A
Green	Michael Wharton	276	14.2	N/A
Conservative	Patience Assam	177	9.1	N/A
Liberal Democrats	Bernard Treves Brown	142	7.3	N/A
Conservative	Shahzadi Begum	137	7.1	N/A
Independent	Zak D’Amelio	118	6.1	N/A
Liberal Democrats	Steve Gillan	96	4.9	N/A
Liberal Democrats	Scott Turner-Preece	61	3.1	N/A
Turnout		1,942	26.48	N/A
Labour win (new seat)				
Labour win (new seat)				
Labour win (new seat)				

=== Boothstown and Ellenbrook ===
Boothstown and Ellenbrook
Party	Candidate	Votes	%	±%
Conservative	Bob Clarke	2,205	57.0	N/A
Conservative	Darren Ward	1,797	46.4	N/A
Conservative	Les Turner	1,345	34.7	N/A
Labour	Teresa Pepper	1,257	32.5	N/A
Labour	Cameron Robinson	1,209	31.2	N/A
Labour	Charlie Rowley	750	19.4	N/A
Green	Diana Battersby	499	12.9	N/A
Liberal Democrats	Ian Chisnell	354	9.1	N/A
Liberal Democrats	Gizella Hughes	140	3.6	N/A
Liberal Democrats	Sebastian Biesiadzinski	130	3.4	N/A
Turnout		3,871	39.84	N/A
Conservative win (new seat)				
Conservative win (new seat)				
Conservative win (new seat)				

=== Broughton ===
Broughton
Party	Candidate	Votes	%	±%
Labour	Maria Brabiner	1,217	55.2	N/A
Labour	Jim King	1,209	54.8	N/A
Labour	John Merry	1,013	45.9	N/A
Conservative	Bernard Goldfine	431	19.5	N/A
Green	David Jones	367	16.6	N/A
Conservative	Paul Mebeze	323	14.6	N/A
Conservative	Aftab Sabir	270	12.2	N/A
Liberal Democrats	Deklan Parry	152	6.9	N/A
Turnout		2,206	23.26	N/A
Labour win (new seat)				
Labour win (new seat)				
Labour win (new seat)				

=== Cadishead and Lower Irlam ===
Cadishead and Lower Irlam
Party	Candidate	Votes	%	±%
Labour	Lewis Nelson	1,829	63.0	N/A
Labour	Hannah Robinson-Smith	1,199	41.3	N/A
Labour	Joan Walsh	1,052	36.2	N/A
Core Independents	Dave Pike	1,046	36.0	N/A
Conservative	Andrew Miller	537	18.5	N/A
Conservative	Jan Meades-Smith	530	18.3	N/A
Turnout		2,903	30.63	N/A
Labour win (new seat)				
Labour win (new seat)				
Labour win (new seat)				

=== Claremont ===
Claremont
Party	Candidate	Votes	%	±%
Labour	Barbara Bentham	1,745	54.3	N/A
Labour	Michael Pevitt	1,413	43.9	N/A
Labour	Neil Reynolds	1,372	42.7	N/A
Conservative	Jonathan Grosskopf	507	15.8	N/A
Green	Robert Stephenson	504	15.7	N/A
Liberal Democrats	Jake Overend	489	15.2	N/A
Liberal Democrats	Patricia Murphy	441	13.7	N/A
Independent	Mary Ferrer	438	13.6	N/A
Conservative	Myrella Saunders	427	13.3	N/A
Liberal Democrats	John Grant	414	12.9	N/A
Conservative	Jackie Mountaine	399	12.4	N/A
Turnout		3,216	32.26	N/A
Labour win (new seat)				
Labour win (new seat)				
Labour win (new seat)				

=== Eccles ===
Eccles
Party	Candidate	Votes	%	±%
Labour	Sharmina August	2,132	58.7	N/A
Labour	Mike McCusker	1,834	50.5	N/A
Labour	Nathaniel Tetteh	1,451	39.9	N/A
Conservative	David Cawdrey	819	22.5	N/A
Green	Clive Hamilton	799	22.0	N/A
Conservative	Karl Craig	754	20.7	N/A
Conservative	Alima Husain	507	13.9	N/A
Liberal Democrats	John McLellan	379	10.4	N/A
Women's Equality	Donna-Marree Humphery	342	9.4	N/A
TUSC	Sally Griffiths	173	4.8	N/A
Turnout		3,635	33.16	N/A
Labour win (new seat)				
Labour win (new seat)				
Labour win (new seat)				

=== Higher Irlam and Peel Green ===
Higher Irlam and Peel Green
Party	Candidate	Votes	%	±%
Labour	Tracy Kelly	1,320	52.4	N/A
Labour	Roger Jones	1,251	49.7	N/A
Labour	Peter Taylor	1,070	42.5	N/A
Conservative	Edson Ferreira	599	23.8	N/A
Core Independents	Paula Goulden	506	20.1	N/A
Core Independents	Nigel Perry	444	17.6	N/A
Core Independents	Darren Goulden	432	17.2	N/A
Conservative	Javaid Hussain	285	11.3	N/A
Turnout		2,517	25.86	N/A
Labour win (new seat)				
Labour win (new seat)				
Labour win (new seat)				

=== Kersal and Broughton Park ===
Kersal and Broughton Park
Party	Candidate	Votes	%	±%
Conservative	Arnie Saunders	1,797	59.5	N/A
Conservative	Ari Leitner	1,679	55.6	N/A
Liberal Democrats	Avrohom Walter	891	29.5	N/A
Labour	Yolande Amana-Ghola	721	23.9	N/A
Conservative	Azmat Husain	711	23.6	N/A
Labour	Roseanna Wain	707	23.4	N/A
Labour	Mishal Saeed	559	18.5	N/A
Green	Jane Ransley	363	12.0	N/A
Turnout		9503	31.88	N/A
Conservative win (new seat)				
Conservative win (new seat)				
Liberal Democrats win (new seat)				

=== Little Hulton ===
Little Hulton
Party	Candidate	Votes	%	±%
Labour	Kate Lewis	1,115	62.3	N/A
Labour	Rob Sharpe	905	50.6	N/A
Labour	Colette Weir	709	39.6	N/A
Conservative	Dorothy Chapman	438	24.5	N/A
Green	Stuart Oxbrow	318	17.8	N/A
Conservative	Adrees Masood	236	13.2	N/A
Turnout		3721	19.52	N/A
Labour win (new seat)				
Labour win (new seat)				
Labour win (new seat)				

=== Ordsall ===
Ordsall
Party	Candidate	Votes	%	±%
Labour	Tanya Burch	1,229	71.5	N/A
Labour	Ray Mashiter	934	54.3	N/A
Labour	John Walsh	758	44.1	N/A
Green	Nicola Smith	438	25.5	N/A
Conservative	Lynn Crodon	229	13.3	N/A
Liberal Democrats	Thomas Balcombe	162	9.4	N/A
Conservative	Tim Ilett	159	9.2	N/A
Liberal Democrats	Paul Cooper	109	6.3	N/A
Turnout		1,719	24.70	N/A
Labour win (new seat)				
Labour win (new seat)				
Labour win (new seat)				

=== Pendlebury and Clifton ===
Pendlebury and Clifton
Party	Candidate	Votes	%	±%
Labour	Damian Craig	1,229	48.9	N/A
Labour	Barry Warner	1,113	44.3	N/A
Labour	Sophia Linden	1,038	41.3	N/A
Conservative	Sam Hall	577	22.9	N/A
Conservative	Gary Betreen	575	22.9	N/A
Conservative	Nick Kahn	449	17.9	N/A
Green	Peter Mulleady	371	14.8	N/A
Liberal Democrats	Gareth Watkins	193	7.7	N/A
Independent	Jonathan Marsden	132	5.2	N/A
Turnout		2,515	27.37%	N/A
Labour win (new seat)				
Labour win (new seat)				
Labour win (new seat)				

=== Pendleton and Charlestown ===
Pendleton and Charlestown
Party	Candidate	Votes	%	±%
Labour	Michele Barnes	1,279	62.3	N/A
Labour	Wilson Nkurunziza	1,028	50.0	N/A
Labour	John Warmisham	943	45.9	N/A
Green	Andrew Nadin	430	20.9	N/A
Conservative	Samantha McAntagart	328	16.0	N/A
Conservative	Avrohom Lederberger	270	13.1	N/A
Liberal Democrats	John Nuttall	252	12.3	N/A
Independent	George Broadley	115	5.6	N/A
Independent	Oliver Youd	70	3.4	N/A
Turnout		2,054	21.63	N/A
Labour win (new seat)				
Labour win (new seat)				
Labour win (new seat)				

=== Quays ===
Quays
Party	Candidate	Votes	%	±%
Labour	Ann-Marie Humphreys	959	56.7	N/A
Labour	Jake Rowland	723	42.8	N/A
Labour	Phil Tresadern	639	37.8	N/A
Liberal Democrats	Alex Warren	531	31.4	N/A
Green	Lucy Masters	376	22.2	N/A
Liberal Democrats	Bryn Coombe	347	20.5	N/A
Liberal Democrats	Alexander Wynne	338	20.0	N/A
Green	James Thomas	246	14.6	N/A
Conservative	Samina Khan	168	9.9	N/A
Conservative	David Semple	167	9.9	N/A
Conservative	Wade Majid	162	9.6	N/A
Turnout		4656	27.39	N/A
Labour win (new seat)				
Labour win (new seat)				
Labour win (new seat)				

=== Swinton and Wardley ===
Swinton and Wardley
Party	Candidate	Votes	%	±%
Labour	Jim Dawson	1,672	59.8	N/A
Labour	Bill Hinds	1,429	51.1	N/A
Labour	Gina Reynolds	1,245	44.5	N/A
Conservative	Christopher Cunliffe	701	25.1	N/A
Conservative	Robert Frazer	568	20.3	N/A
Independent	Andrew Olsen	300	10.7	N/A
Liberal Democrats	Ian Mckinlay	297	10.6	N/A
Turnout		2,797	29.98	N/A
Labour win (new seat)				
Labour win (new seat)				
Labour win (new seat)				

=== Swinton Park ===
Swinton Park
Party	Candidate	Votes	%	±%
Labour	Heather Fletcher	1,425	49.2	N/A
Labour	Jim Cammell	1,398	48.2	N/A
Labour	Stuart Dickman	1,282	44.2	N/A
Conservative	Danny Brookes	631	21.8	N/A
Conservative	Joe Olive	453	15.6	N/A
Independent	Joe O'Neill	453	15.6	N/A
Conservative	Derek Meades	426	14.7	N/A
Green	Howard Balkind	412	14.2	N/A
Independent	Christopher Barnes	272	9.4	N/A
Liberal Democrats	Kenneth Thompson	206	7.1	N/A
Turnout		2,899	30.62	N/A
Labour win (new seat)				
Labour win (new seat)				
Labour win (new seat)				

=== Walkden North ===
Walkden North
Party	Candidate	Votes	%	±%
Labour	Adrian Brocklehurst	1,365	62.5	N/A
Labour	Sammie Bellamy	1,106	50.7	N/A
Labour	Jack Youd	875	40.1	N/A
Conservative	Craig Thompson	501	23.0	N/A
Green	Frederick Battersby	411	18.8	N/A
Conservative	Jon Carlyle	400	18.3	N/A
Liberal Democrats	Jessica Sutherland	240	11.0	N/A
Turnout		2,183	23.39	N/A
Labour win (new seat)				
Labour win (new seat)				
Labour win (new seat)				

=== Walkden South ===
Walkden South
Party	Candidate	Votes	%	±%
Labour	Joshua Brooks	1,703	53.9	N/A
Labour	Margaret Morris	1,347	42.6	N/A
Labour	Irfan Syed	1,066	33.7	N/A
Conservative	Lewis Croden	1,060	33.5	N/A
Conservative	Chris Midgley	1,014	32.1	N/A
Conservative	Jason Gallagher	978	30.9	N/A
Green	Thomas Dylan	501	15.8	N/A
Liberal Democrats	Susan Lewis	259	8.2	N/A
Turnout		3,161	35.47	N/A
Labour win (new seat)				
Labour win (new seat)				
Labour win (new seat)				

=== Weaste and Seedley ===
Weaste and Seedley
Party	Candidate	Votes	%	±%
Labour	Philip Cusack	1,747	65.2	N/A
Labour	Madeline Wade	1,423	53.1	N/A
Labour	Alexis Shama	1,330	49.6	N/A
Conservative	Michael Richman	529	19.7	N/A
Liberal Democrats	Andrew Markham	398	14.9	N/A
Independent	Barrie Fallows	365	13.6	N/A
Turnout		2,679	24.44	N/A
Labour win (new seat)				
Labour win (new seat)				
Labour win (new seat)				

=== Worsley and Westwood Park ===
Worsley and Westwood Park
Party	Candidate	Votes	%	±%
Conservative	Karen Garrido	1,440	45.8	N/A
Conservative	Robin Garrido	1,224	38.9	N/A
Labour	Tony Davies	1,220	38.8	N/A
Conservative	Adam Kealey	1,082	34.4	N/A
Labour	Michelle Mullen	1,007	32.0	N/A
Labour	Ben Grogan	850	27.0	N/A
Green	Christopher Bertenshaw	456	14.5	N/A
Liberal Democrats	James Blessing	275	8.7	N/A
Liberal Democrats	Stuart Robbins	209	6.6	N/A
Liberal Democrats	Daniel Wells	130	4.1	N/A
Turnout		3,145	35.05	N/A
Conservative win (new seat)				
Conservative win (new seat)				
Labour win (new seat)				

== By-elections ==
=== Blackfriars & Trinity ===
Blackfriars & Trinity: 4 November 2021
Party	Candidate	Votes	%	±%
Labour	Roseanna Wain	408	51.8	−2.3
Green	David Jones	160	20.3	−6.4
Liberal Democrats	Joseph Allen	152	19.3	+13.0
Conservative	Christopher Bates	68	8.6	+0.8
Majority		248	31.5	
Turnout		788	10.1	
Labour hold		Swing	▲2.1	
