= Rebecca Long-Bailey =

British politician (born 1979)

Rebecca Long-Bailey MP
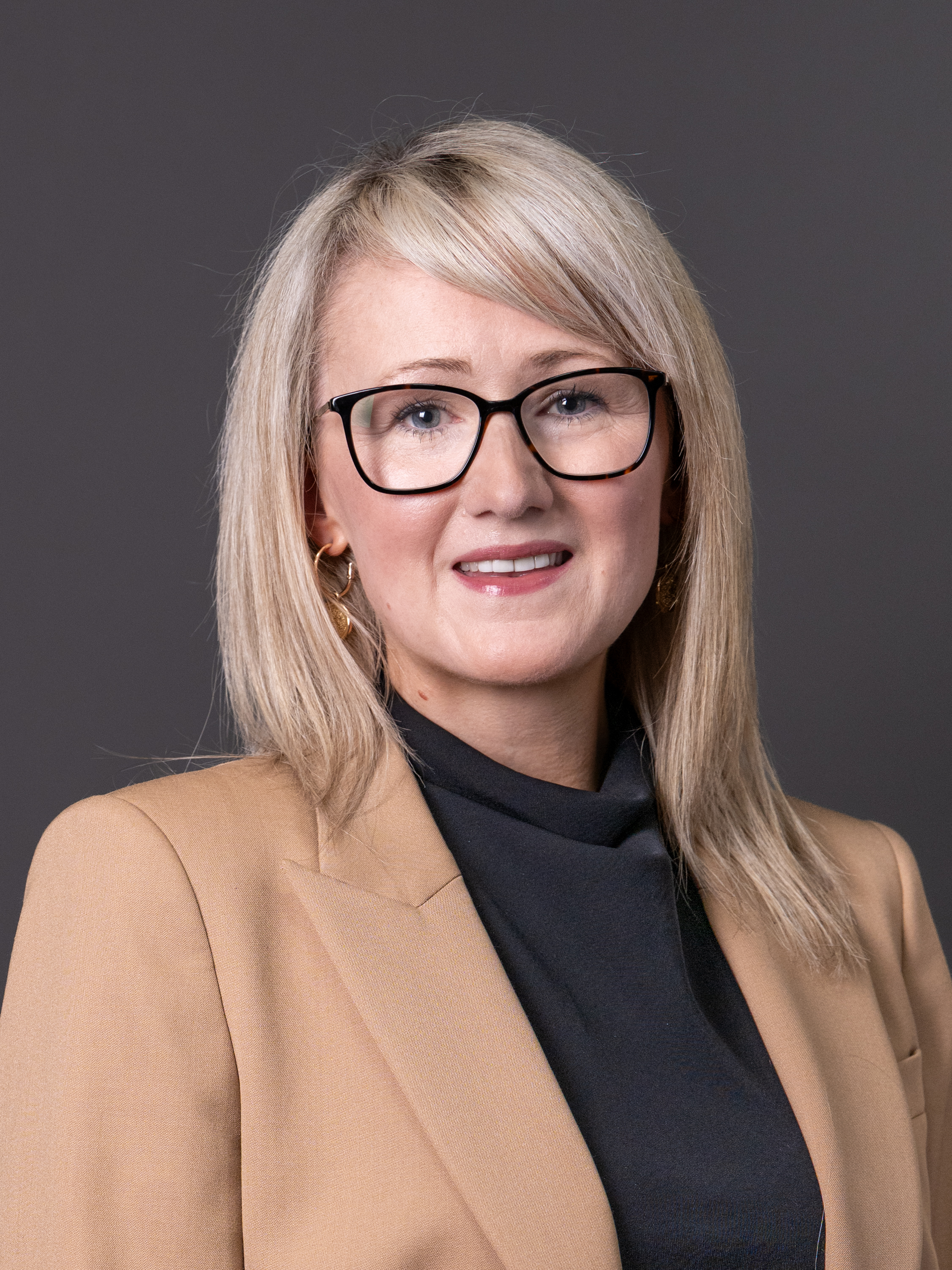
- Official portrait, 2026

Shadow Secretary of State for Education
- In office 6 April 2020 – 25 June 2020
- Leader: Keir Starmer
- Preceded by: Angela Rayner
- Succeeded by: Kate Green

Shadow Secretary of State for Business, Energy and Industrial Strategy
- In office 9 February 2017 – 6 April 2020
- Leader: Jeremy Corbyn
- Preceded by: Clive Lewis
- Succeeded by: Ed Miliband

Shadow Chief Secretary to the Treasury
- In office 27 June 2016 – 9 February 2017
- Leader: Jeremy Corbyn
- Preceded by: Seema Malhotra
- Succeeded by: Peter Dowd

Shadow Minister for the Treasury
- In office 18 September 2015 – 27 June 2016
- Leader: Jeremy Corbyn

Member of Parliament for Salford Salford and Eccles (2015–2024)
- Incumbent
- Assumed office 7 May 2015
- Preceded by: Hazel Blears
- Majority: 15,101 (38.0%)

Personal details
- Born: Rebecca Roseanne Long; 22 September 1979 (age 47) Old Trafford, Greater Manchester, England
- Party: Labour
- Other political affiliations: Independent (2024–2025); Socialist Campaign Group
- Spouse: Stephen Bailey
- Children: 1
- Education: Chester Catholic High School
- Alma mater: Manchester Metropolitan University (BA)
- Occupation: Politician; solicitor
- Website: www.rebeccalongbailey.com

Rebecca Roseanne Long-Bailey (née Long; born 22 September 1979) is a British Labour Party politician and solicitor who has been Member of Parliament (MP) for Salford, previously Salford and Eccles, since 2015. She served in the Shadow Cabinet under Jeremy Corbyn, first as Shadow Chief Secretary to the Treasury from 2016 to 2017 and then as Shadow Business Secretary from 2017 to 2020. Under Keir Starmer, she served as Shadow Education Secretary from April to June 2020.

Long-Bailey was elected to the House of Commons at the 2015 general election. After Jeremy Corbyn was elected in the 2015 Labour leadership election, Long-Bailey was appointed as a shadow Junior Treasury Minister and was nominated to sit on the National Executive Committee of the Labour Party.

Long-Bailey was a candidate in the 2020 Labour Party leadership election, finishing second to Keir Starmer. In July 2024, Long-Bailey was suspended for a term of six months along with six other Labour MPs from the Labour Left for voting in favour of a proposed Scottish National Party amendment to the king's speech at the 2024 State Opening of Parliament in favour of removing the two-child benefit cap.

== Early life and career ==
Rebecca Long was born on 22 September 1979 in Old Trafford, Greater Manchester to Irish parents. Her father, Jimmy Long, was a docker in Salford Quays and a trade union representative at Shell, Barton Docks, and her mother Una was a shop worker. She attended Chester Catholic High School.

Her first job was in a pawn shop, something she says "taught [her] more about the struggles of life than any degree or qualification ever could". She also worked in various call centres, a furniture factory, and in postal delivery before eventually studying to become a solicitor.

Long-Bailey studied Politics and Sociology at Manchester Metropolitan University, and then completed "various part-time law conversion and solicitors' courses". She has worked for the law firm Pinsent Masons and in 2003, began working in landlord and tenant law for the law firm Halliwells; she was admitted as a solicitor on 1 November 2007 and moved that year to work for Hill Dickinson, specialising in commercial law, commercial property, NHS contracts and NHS estates. On selection as a Labour Party candidate in 2014 she wrote that she had "been working as a solicitor with the NHS in Manchester for 10 years". The Sunday Times said that she was incorrect as she was only a solicitor since 2007, though she was a trainee solicitor and paralegal from 2003 to 2007.

Long-Bailey joined the Labour Party in 2010. A spokesperson reported that she was moved to attend a Labour Party meeting after seeing "dramatic plans to dismantle" the NHS in her work as a solicitor.

== Parliamentary career ==
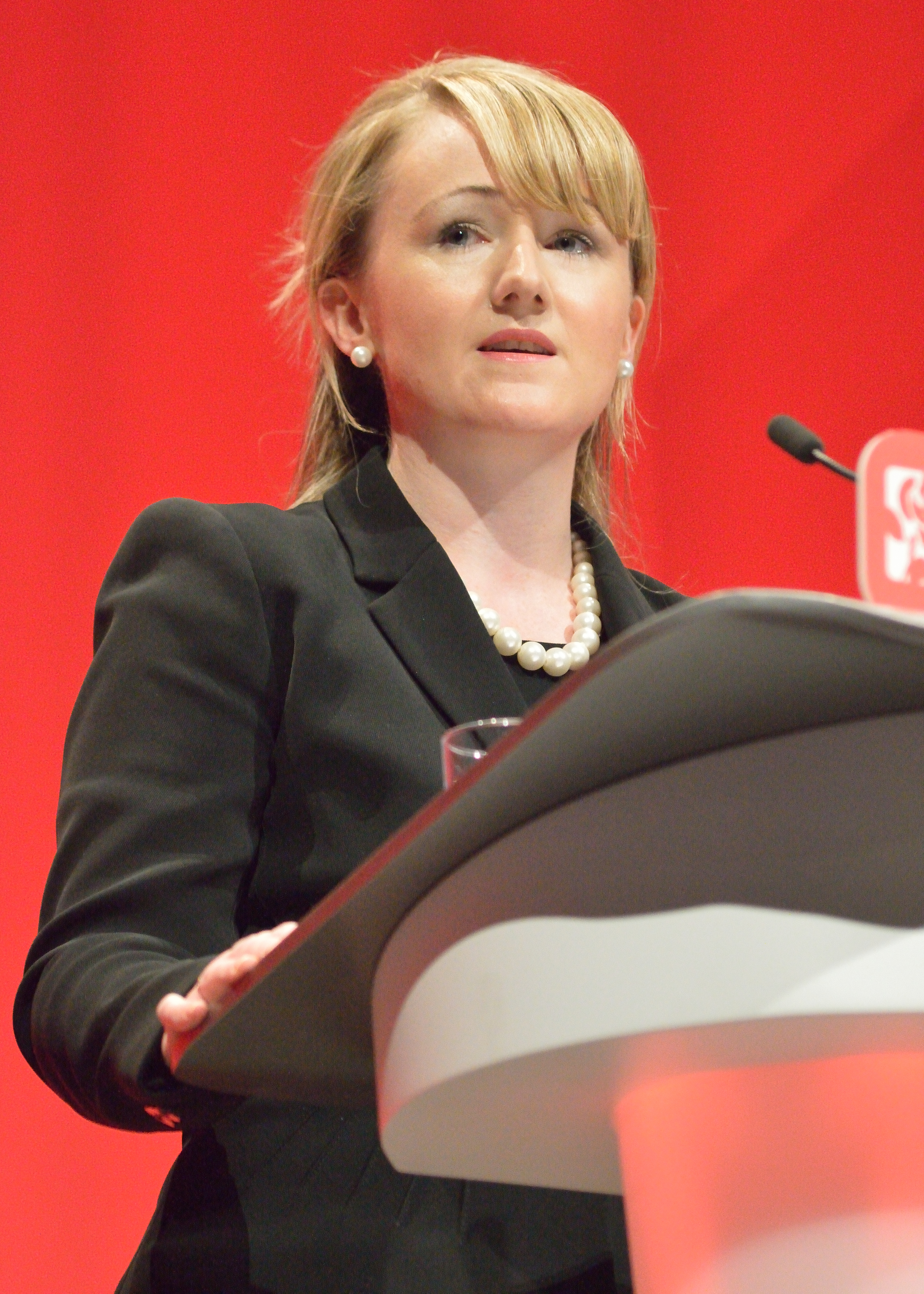
Long-Bailey at the 2016 Labour Conference

At the 2015 general election, Long-Bailey was elected to Parliament as MP for Salford and Eccles with 49.4% of the vote and a majority of 12,541.

=== Corbyn leadership ===
Long-Bailey was one of 36 Labour MPs to nominate Jeremy Corbyn as a candidate in the 2015 Labour leadership election. On 18 September 2015, after Corbyn was elected as leader, she was appointed as a Shadow Minister for the Treasury as part of his first frontbench team. She was also appointed to Labour's National Executive Committee by Corbyn as one of three representatives of the front bench, replacing Hilary Benn.

Long-Bailey was appointed as the Shadow Chief Secretary to the Treasury on 27 June 2016 after there were several resignations from the Shadow Cabinet. Following Clive Lewis's resignation from the Shadow Cabinet over Corbyn's whipping of the Article 50 vote, Long-Bailey was appointed as the Shadow Secretary of State for Business, Energy and Industrial Strategy on 9 February 2017.

At the 2017 general election, she was re-elected to Parliament as MP for Salford and Eccles with an increased vote share of 65.6% and an increased majority of 19,132.

In 2019, Long-Bailey contributed to the writing of Labour's manifesto for that year's general election. She said that "I don't just agree with the policies, I've spent the last four years writing them".

At the 2019 general election, she was again re-elected, with a decreased vote share of 56.8% and a decreased majority of 16,327.

==== 2020 leadership election ====
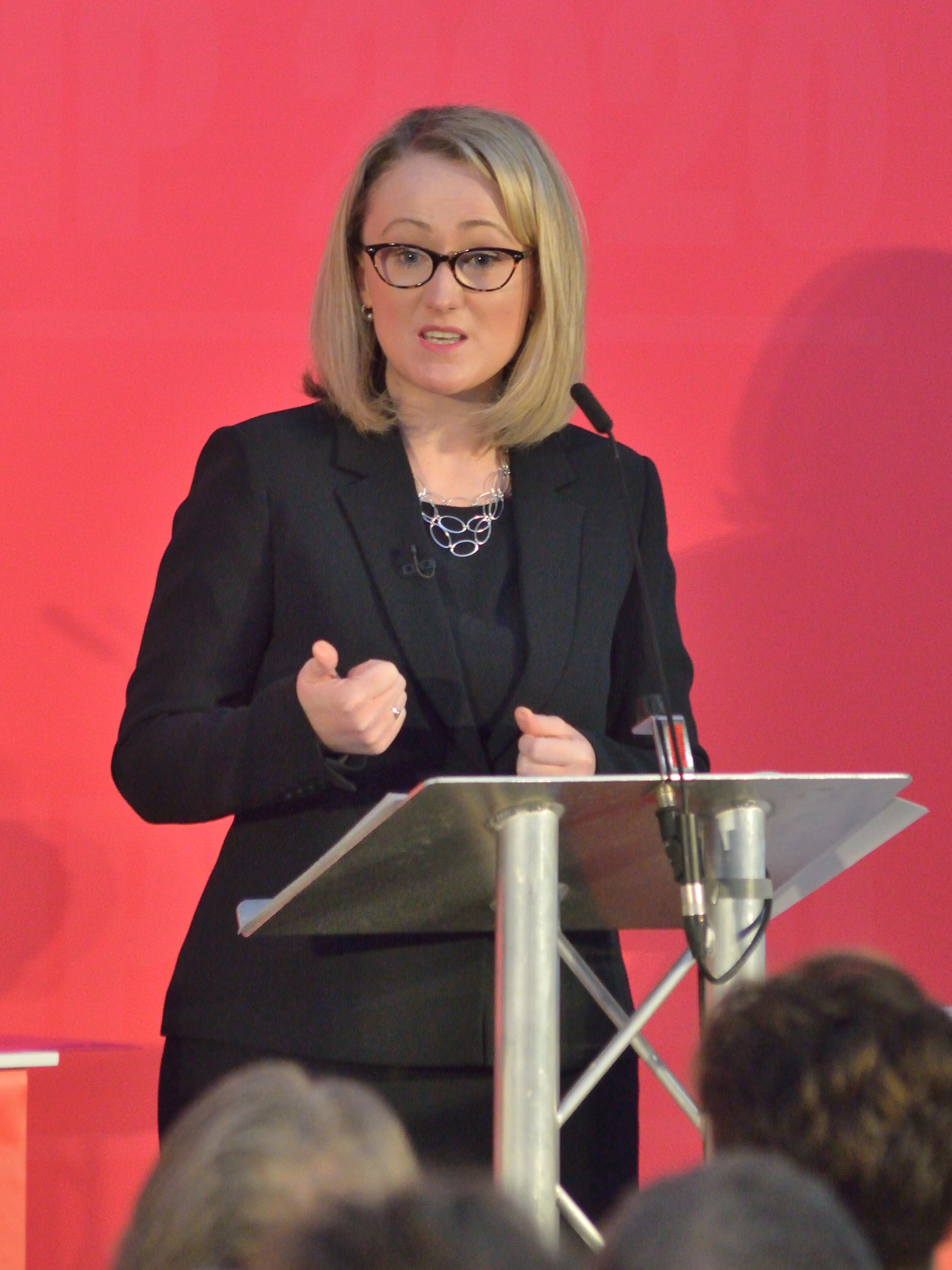
Long-Bailey speaking at the 2020 Labour Party leadership election hustings in Bristol

Following Labour's defeat in the 2019 general election, Jeremy Corbyn announced that he would stand down as Leader of the Labour Party. Long-Bailey announced in an article for Tribune magazine on 6 January 2020 that she would stand for the leadership. Her flatmate Angela Rayner ran for deputy leader, with the pair having made an agreement to run on an unofficial joint ticket. Near the beginning of the campaign, Long-Bailey said she would score Corbyn "10 out of 10" for his leadership of the party, adding that before the election he was "savaged by the press".

She received 33 nominations from Labour MPs and MEPs, comprising 15% of members of the two groups, which is above the 10% needed to pass the first stage of the process. In the next stage, she received endorsements from 164 of 648 Constituency Labour Parties (25.3%) and 7 of 32 Labour Party affiliates, leading her to be one of three candidates listed on the ballot for leader, alongside Keir Starmer and Lisa Nandy.

She was endorsed by Unite the Union on 24 January after general secretary Len McCluskey said she had the "brains and brilliance" to "take on" Boris Johnson. She was also endorsed by the Momentum organisation. Long-Bailey was seen by many observers and party colleagues as the continuity candidate who would continue to take the party in the same direction as Corbyn. While she disputed the description, her campaign stressed ideological continuity with Corbyn.

During the leadership election it emerged that despite stating that she was against "rip-off" private finance contracts in the NHS, Long-Bailey had previously worked on many of these during her time as a corporate lawyer with the law firm Hill Dickinson. It was revealed that Long-Bailey worked on NHS PFI contracts worth over £190 million to Luxembourg-based firms, causing her some embarrassment during the campaign given this was largely seen to be the type of back-door privatisation of the NHS she had previously fiercely campaigned against.

Long-Bailey ultimately came second place in the contest, receiving 27.6% of the vote share with 135,218 votes. Starmer was elected as the next Labour leader with a 56.2% vote share (275,780 votes), over double that of Long-Bailey's.

=== Starmer leadership ===
Starmer appointed Long-Bailey as his first Shadow Secretary of State for Education on 6 April 2020.

Long-Bailey's portfolio soon came into prominence over the government's plans to reopen schools during the COVID-19 pandemic. The government had closed schools on 20 March to all but the most vulnerable pupils and the children of key workers due to the pandemic. While Starmer supported the government's aim to prioritise the reopening of schools and steered clear of a debate on the issue, Long-Bailey supported teachers' unions and their "concerns about the government's plans to reopen schools without proper health and safety precautions in place". On 3 May, Long-Bailey expressed support for the National Education Union's (NEU) five conditions for the reopening of schools. The five conditions were also supported by other Labour MPs including Angela Rayner. According to Jacobin magazine, Long-Bailey's support for the teachers' unions resulted in her being sidelined from representing the Labour Party in the media; however, she continued to provide support for the NEU's position through social media. The government decided to begin a staggered reopening of schools from 1 June. In early June, the government accepted the concerns of the teachers' unions and abandoned its plan for all students in England to return to school before the summer break.

Long-Bailey was sacked by Starmer on 25 June 2020, after using Twitter to share an interview with British actress Maxine Peake in which Peake said that the practice of police officers in the United States kneeling on someone's neck was "learnt from seminars with Israeli secret services". Peake and The Independent both retracted the claim, which had been linked to a report by Amnesty International. Amnesty said that they had never reported that Israeli security forces had taught the technique to anyone, which included police in Minneapolis. Long-Bailey described Peake as an "absolute diamond", before using a second tweet to say that she did not endorse "all aspects" of the interview. Before being dismissed, she was instructed to delete both tweets by Starmer's office but refused, and HuffPost UK said it was told that she refused to take phone calls from Starmer's office. Long-Bailey said: "I had asked to discuss these matters with Keir before agreeing what further action to take, but sadly he had already made his decision."

Long-Bailey was one of six Labour rebels to vote against the successful renewal of the Coronavirus Act 2020, which continued granting the government emergency powers to tackle the COVID-19 pandemic. She argued the government act denied parliamentary scrutiny and allowed "clumsy and asymmetric authoritarianism", in reference to police powers to detain potentially infectious people.

Due to the 2023 review of Westminster constituencies, Long-Bailey's constituency of Salford and Eccles was abolished, and replaced with Salford. At the 2024 general election, Long-Bailey was elected to Parliament as MP for Salford with 53.2% of the vote and a majority of 15,101.

In July 2024, Long-Bailey was one of seven Labour rebels who voted in favour of a SNP motion to scrap the two-child benefit cap. As a result, she, along with the six other rebels, had the whip suspended for six months.

== Political views ==
In 2025, Long-Bailey opposed the construction of ten apartment buildings with 3,300 housing units (including 660 affordable units) in Salford. She argued that the increased housing supply "won’t help tackle the urgent need for social and affordable housing", would "drastically impact Salford’s skyline", could worsen the housing crisis, and that the developers should listen to community objections.

Long-Bailey supports the right to abortion and voted for the repeal of a ban on abortion in Northern Ireland. She does not support a difference in abortion laws on the grounds of disability, quoting the Disability Rights Commission: "the context in which parents choose whether to have a child should be one in which disability and non-disability are valued equally".

Long-Bailey said that she was unhappy with Labour's response to allegations of antisemitism within the party during Corbyn's leadership, commenting that "I don’t think we were dealing with complaints quickly enough". She said that if she was Labour leader then she would follow the recommendations of the Board of Deputies of British Jews and the Equality and Human Rights Commission.

Long-Bailey has spoken in favour of a Green New Deal, pledging in a speech to "fight for investment in the low-carbon industries of today and tomorrow to secure a liveable planet for future generations".

On constitutional reform, Long-Bailey supports abolishing the House of Lords, believing that checks and balances are necessary but should not be done by "a set of completely unelected people". She suggested that it should be replaced by a senate elected by proportional representation, which would analyse legislation with respect to "our wealth, our wellbeing, and our environmental sustainability".

Long-Bailey has said that she would be "prepared to use" the UK's nuclear deterrent as Prime Minister, adding that "any leader needs to ensure that they assess the situation" and "address the consequences of their actions".

Long-Bailey voted in favour of same-sex marriage in Northern Ireland.

On the issue of a second Scottish independence referendum, Long-Bailey has said that she would campaign against independence, but that she "wouldn't want to inhibit the democracy of people" in Scotland.

In 2020, Long-Bailey signed the Labour Campaign for Trans Rights pledge, which described certain organisations as "trans-exclusionist hate groups", and called for people who supported those groups to be expelled from the Labour Party. The pledge states that the party has "failed to act as transphobia has gained ground" within the party. The accused groups denied being transphobic. One of the groups, Woman's Place UK, called the accusation "defamatory" and stated, "We call on the Labour Party to demonstrate its opposition to this misogynistic abuse of women. Defend us or expel us" prompting some Twitter users to use the hashtag #expelme in protest against the pledge.

Long-Bailey has said she would support workers in all strike actions and industrial disputes, "no questions asked".

In July 2020, Long-Bailey joined the All Party Parliamentary Group on Whistleblowing.

Long-Bailey was opposed to the planned extradition of Julian Assange to the United States (which ultimately did not occur) and was one of six sponsors of an Early Day Motion against it in July 2020.

Long-Bailey said it was "simply staggering that income from wealth continues to be taxed at a lower rate than income from work" and wants what she sees as unfairness to end. Long-Bailey wants "a wealth tax on the super-rich" together with further wealth redistribution to pay for public services as well as raised windfall taxes on "the super-profits of oil and gas companies".

== Personal life ==
Long-Bailey is married to Stephen Bailey, a marketing executive who works for a chemicals company, and has one son. She is a Roman Catholic but disagrees with many of the Church's teachings.

Parliament of the United Kingdom
Preceded by Hazel Blears	Member of Parliament for Salford and Eccles; 2015–present	Incumbent
Political offices
Preceded by Seema Malhotra	Shadow Chief Secretary to the Treasury; 2016–2017	Succeeded by Peter Dowd
Preceded by Clive Lewis	Shadow Secretary of State for Business, Energy and Industrial Strategy; 2017–2020	Succeeded by Ed Miliband
Preceded by Angela Rayner	Shadow Secretary of State for Education; 2020	Succeeded by Kate Green
