= Salford City Council =

Local government body in England

- Coat of arms

- Council logo

Type
- Type: Metropolitan borough council

Leadership
- Ceremonial Mayor: Robin Garrido, Conservative since 27 May 2026
- City Mayor: Paul Dennett, Labour since 6 May 2016
- Chief Executive: Stephen Young since 1 September 2025

Structure
- Seats: 60 councillors plus elected mayor
- Graph of the party split among 60 seats.
- Political groups: Administration (34) Labour (34) Other parties (26) Reform (14) Conservative (6) Green (3) Liberal Democrats (1) Independent (2)
- Joint committees: Greater Manchester Combined Authority; Greater Manchester Police, Fire and Crime Panel
- Length of term: 4 years

Elections
- Voting system: First-past-the-post
- Last election: 7 May 2026
- Next election: 6 May 2027

Motto
- Salus populi suprema lex (The welfare of the people is the highest law)

Meeting place
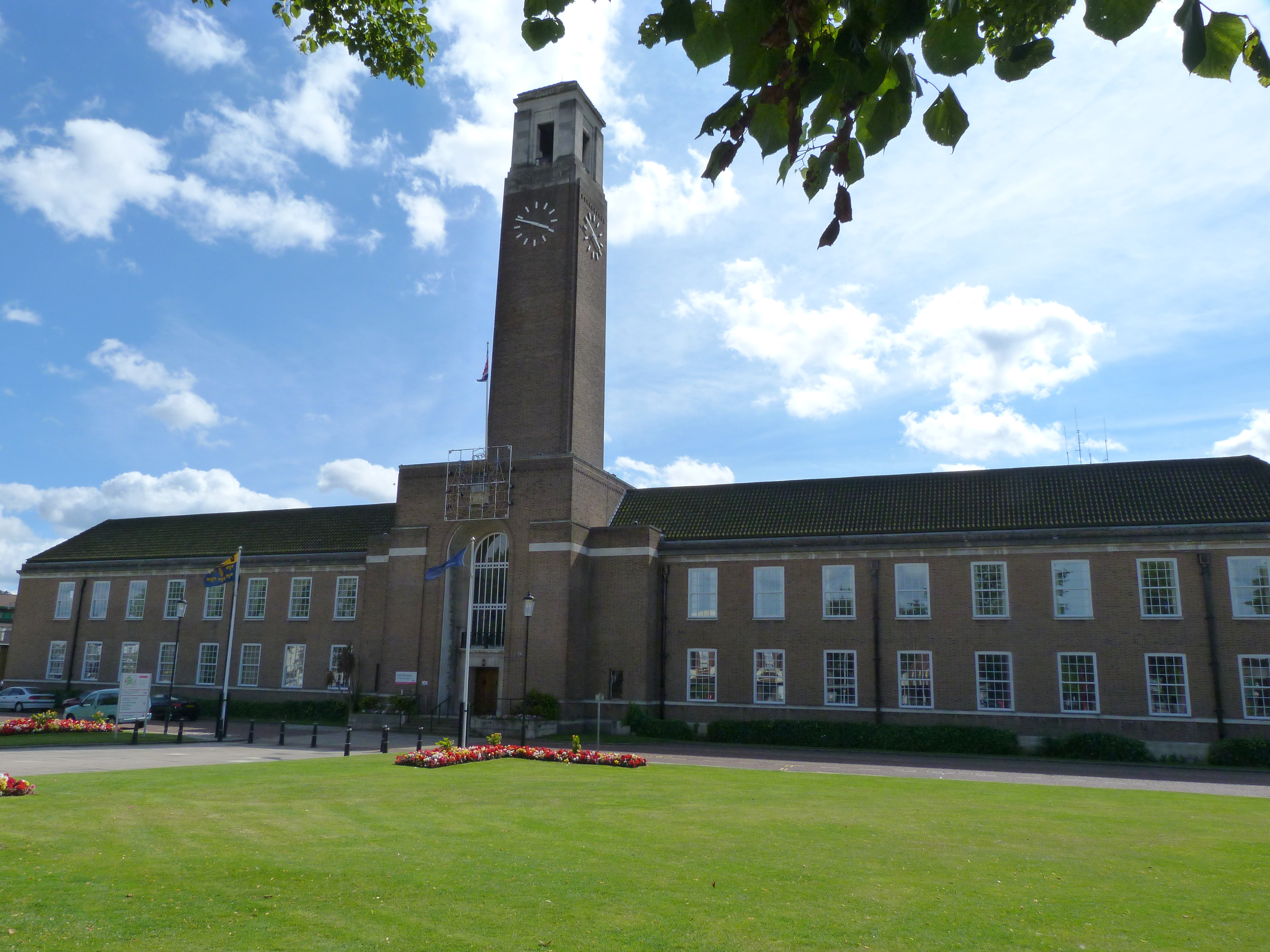
- Salford Civic Centre, Chorley Road, Swinton, Manchester, M27 5AW

Website
- salford.gov.uk

Salford City Council is the local authority for the City of Salford, a metropolitan borough with city status in Greater Manchester, England. It is a metropolitan borough council and provides the majority of local government services in the city. The council has been a member of the Greater Manchester Combined Authority since 2011.

The council has been under Labour majority control since the metropolitan borough was created in 1974. Since 2012 the council has been led by the directly elected Mayor of Salford, which post has been held by Paul Dennett of the Labour Party since 2016. The council is based at Salford Civic Centre in Swinton.

== History ==
The settlement of Salford had anciently been administered as a township within the parish of Manchester, which in turn formed part of the Salford Hundred. Around 1230 the settlement was given a charter by Ranulf de Blondeville, 6th Earl of Chester, who was the lord of the manor at the time, making it a seigneurial borough with a limited degree of self-government. In 1791 a body of improvement commissioners was established to administer the town, largely superseding the old manorial authorities.

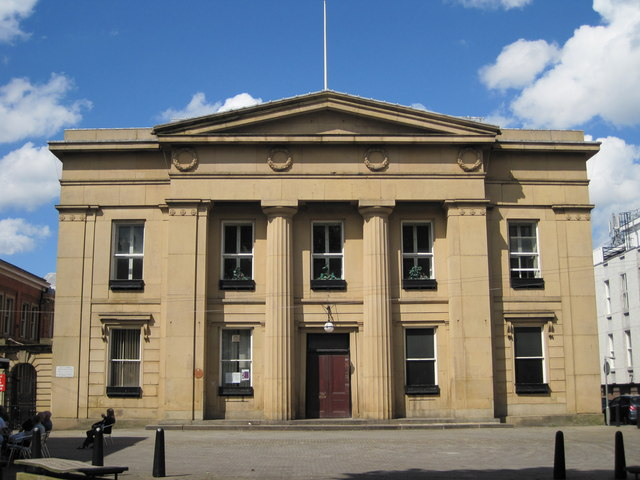
Former Town Hall, Salford: Completed 1827, meeting place of the old city council until 1974

Salford was incorporated as a municipal borough in 1844, after which it was governed by a body formally called the 'mayor, aldermen and burgesses of the borough of Salford', generally known as the corporation or town council. When elected county councils were established in 1889, Salford was considered large enough for its existing council to provide county-level services, and so it was made a county borough, independent from the new Lancashire County Council, whilst remaining part of the geographical county of Lancashire. Salford was granted city status in 1926, after which the corporation was also known as the city council.

The larger metropolitan district of Salford and its council were created in 1974 under the Local Government Act 1972 as one of ten metropolitan districts within the new metropolitan county of Greater Manchester. The first election was held in 1973. For its first year the council acted as a shadow authority alongside the area's five outgoing authorities, being the borough councils of Salford, Eccles and Swinton and Pendlebury and the urban district councils of Irlam and Worsley. The new metropolitan district and its council formally came into being on 1 April 1974, at which point the old districts and their councils were abolished. Salford's borough and city statuses both passed to the new district, allowing the council to take the name Salford City Council and appoint a mayor, continuing Salford's series of mayors dating back to 1844.

From 1974 until 1986 the council was a lower-tier authority, with upper-tier functions provided by the Greater Manchester County Council. The county council was abolished in 1986 and its functions passed to Greater Manchester's ten borough councils, including Salford City Council, with some services provided through joint committees.

Between 2005 and 2020 some services, including property, highways and infrastructure, planning and building control were provided by Urban Vision, a public-private partnership formed between the city council, Capita and Galliford Try. The contract with Urban Vision finished in 2020 and was not renewed, with services being brought back in-house to the council.

Since 2011 the council has been a member of the Greater Manchester Combined Authority, which has been led by the directly elected Mayor of Greater Manchester since 2017. The combined authority provides strategic leadership and co-ordination for certain functions across Greater Manchester, notably regarding transport and town planning, but Salford City Council continues to be responsible for most local government functions.

In 2012 the council changed to having a directly elected mayor as its political leader. The position is called the Mayor of Salford, or the "city mayor". Prior to 2012 the title Mayor of Salford had been used for the council's chairperson and ceremonial figurehead, performing non-political civic duties. The more ceremonial role continues, but now renamed the ceremonial mayor.

== Governance ==
Salford City Council provides metropolitan borough services. Some strategic functions in the area are provided by the Greater Manchester Combined Authority; the Mayor of Salford sits on the combined authority as Salford's representative. There are no civil parishes in the city.

=== Political control ===
The council has been under Labour majority control since the 1974 reforms.

Party	Period
Labour	1974–present

=== Leadership ===
Prior to 2012, political leadership was provided by the leader of the council. The leaders from 1974 to 2012 were:

Councillor	Party	From	To
Les Hough	Labour	1974	26 Apr 1987
Ken Edwards	Labour	20 May 1987	May 1988
Bill Hinds	Labour	May 1988	May 2003
John Merry	Labour	May 2003	6 May 2012

In 2012 the council changed to having a directly elected mayor as its political leader. The mayors since 2012 have been: (Note: Mayoral terms of office run from the fourth day after polling day.)

Mayor	Party	From	To
Ian Stewart	Labour	7 May 2012	8 May 2016
Paul Dennett	Labour	9 May 2016	

=== Composition ===
Following the 2026 election, the composition of the council, excluding the city mayor's seat is:

Party	Councillors
Labour	34
Reform	14
Conservative	6
Green	3
Liberal Democrats	1
Independent	2
Total	60

The next election is due in May 2027.

== Elections ==
Since the last boundary changes took effect in 2021, the council has comprised 60 councillors representing 20 wards, with each ward electing three councillors. Elections are held three years out of every four, with a third of the council (one councillor for each ward) elected each time for a four-year term of office.

== Wards and councillors ==
Ward	Councillor	Party	Term of office
Barton and Winton	John Mullen	Labour	2026-30
Barton and Winton	Michael James Felse	Reform	2026-30
Barton and Winton	Jacqui Fahy	Labour	2024-28
Blackfriars and Trinity	Emma Cammell	Labour	2023-27
Blackfriars and Trinity	Jane Hamilton	Labour	2024-28
Blackfriars and Trinity	David Jones	Green	2026-30
Boothstown and Ellenbrook	Jan Barrington	Conservative	2026-30
Boothstown and Ellenbrook	Darren Ward	Conservative	2023-27
Boothstown and Ellenbrook	Bob Clarke	Conservative	2024-28
Broughton	John Merry	Labour	2026-30
Broughton	Jim King	Labour Co-op	2023-27
Broughton	Maria Brabiner	Labour Co-op	2024-28
Cadishead and Lower Irlam	James Richard Hart	Reform	2026-30
Cadishead and Lower Irlam	Hannah Robinson-Smith	Labour	2023-27
Cadishead and Lower Irlam	Leighton James Medley	Reform	2026-30
Claremont	Christopher Bates	Reform	2026-30
Claremont	Mike Pevitt	Labour	2023-27
Claremont	Barbara Bentham	Labour	2024-28
Eccles	Nathaniel Tetteh	Labour	2026-30
Eccles	Mike McCusker	Labour	2023-27
Eccles	Lisa Muir	Labour	2026-30
Higher Irlam and Peel Green	Christopher Evans	Reform	2026-30
Higher Irlam and Peel Green	John David Walsh	Labour Co-op	2023-27
Higher Irlam and Peel Green	Tracy Kelly	Labour	2024-28
Kersal and Broughton Park	Andrew Walters	Independent	2026-30
Kersal and Broughton Park	Ari Leitner	Conservative	2023-27
Kersal and Broughton Park	Arnold Saunders	Conservative	2024-28
Little Hulton	Lewis Croden	Reform	2026-30
Little Hulton	Rob Sharpe	Labour	2023-27
Little Hulton	Tony Davies	Labour	2024-28
Ordsall	Benjamin Grogan	Labour	2023-27
Ordsall	Martyn Stockley	Green	2026-30
Ordsall	Tanya Burch	Labour	2024-28
Pendlebury and Clifton	Natalie Anne Rowland	Reform	2026-30
Pendlebury and Clifton	Barry Warner	Labour	2023-27
Pendlebury and Clifton	Su Matthews	Labour	2024-28
Pendleton and Charlestown	Daryl Stone-Shaw	Reform	2026-30
Pendleton and Charlestown	Wilson Nkurunziza	Labour	2023-27
Pendleton and Charlestown	Michelle Barnes	Labour	2024-28
Quays	Jake Rowland	Labour	2023-27
Quays	Andrea Romero O'Brien	Green	2026-30
Quays	Jonathan Moore	Liberal Democrats	2024-28
Swinton and Wardley	Peter Charles Jones	Reform	2026-30
Swinton and Wardley	Bill Hinds	Independent (Note: Bill Hinds was elected as a Labour Party councillor but quit in May 2025)	2023-27
Swinton and Wardley	Jim Dawson	Labour	2024-28
Swinton Park	Monika Katarzyna Puchalska	Reform	2026-30
Swinton Park	Jim Cammell	Labour	2023-27
Swinton Park	Heather Fletcher	Labour	2024-28
Walkden North	Miles Henderson	Reform	2026-30
Walkden North	Samantha Bellamy	Labour	2023-27
Walkden North	Adrian Brocklehurst	Labour Co-op	2024-28
Walkden South	Ivan Voronov	Reform	2026-30
Walkden South	Hilaria Asumu	Labour	2023-27
Walkden South	Joshua Mark Brooks	Labour	2024-28
Weaste & Seedley	Paul Doyle	Reform	2026-30
Weaste & Seedley	Charlotte Youd	Labour	2023-27
Weaste & Seedley	Philip Cusack	Labour	2024-28
Worsley and Westwood Park	Kaiden Jason Morrison	Reform	2026-30
Worsley and Westwood Park	Robin Garrido	Conservative	2023-27
Worsley and Westwood Park	James Prady	Labour	2024-28

== Premises ==
The council is based at Salford Civic Centre on Chorley Road in Swinton. The building had been completed in 1938 as Swinton and Pendlebury Town Hall, originally serving as the headquarters of Swinton and Pendlebury Borough Council. The council has additional offices at Turnpike House at 631 Eccles New Road.
