= Rixton (disambiguation) =

Rixton is the former name of British pop rock duo Push Baby.

Rixton may also refer to:

- Hollins Green, a village in Warrington, Cheshire, England; also known as Rixton, from the full parish name of Rixton-with-Glazebrook
- Rixton-with-Glazebrook, a civil parish in the unitary authority of Warrington, Cheshire, England
- Rixton Clay Pits, former clay extraction site in Rixton, near Hollins Green

== See also ==
- Roxton (disambiguation)
