= Glazebrook East Junction–Skelton Junction line =

Former railway line in North West England

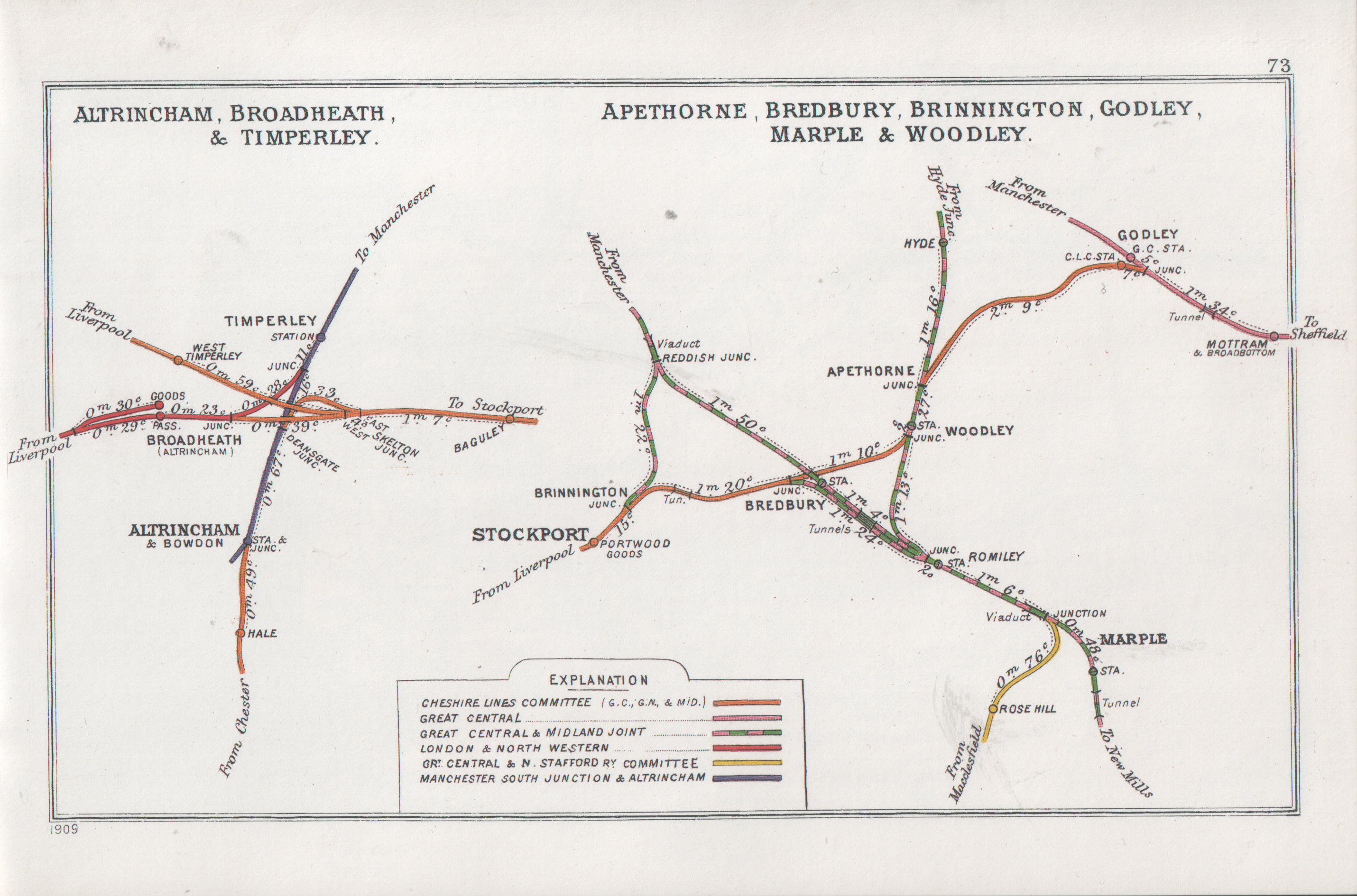
- Pre-Grouping railway junctions in Greater Manchester

Overview
- Status: Closed
- Owner: Network Rail
- Locale: Cheshire and Greater Manchester, England
- Termini: Glazebrook East Junction, (Note: Glazebrook East Junction's location: 53.43026°N 2.45157°W); Skelton Junction (Note: Skelton Junction's location: 53.4002°N 2.3345°W)
- Stations: 3

Service
- Type: Heavy rail
- Operator(s): Cheshire Lines Committee, British Rail

History
- Opened: 1873
- Closed: 1983

Technical
- Line length: 6.4 mi (10.3 km)
- Track gauge: 4 ft 8 1/2 in (1,435 mm) standard gauge

The Glazebrook East Junction–Skelton Junction line was a railway route from Rixton-with-Glazebrook, in Cheshire, to Skelton Junction, in Greater Manchester, England. It connected the Cheshire Lines Committee's main line, between Liverpool Central and Manchester Central, to lines in the Stockport area. This facilitated onward trains through the Pennines, via the Woodhead Line, allowing goods traffic to by-pass central Manchester. It also carried a local passenger service between Stockport Tiviot Dale and Warrington Central until the early 1960s.

== History ==
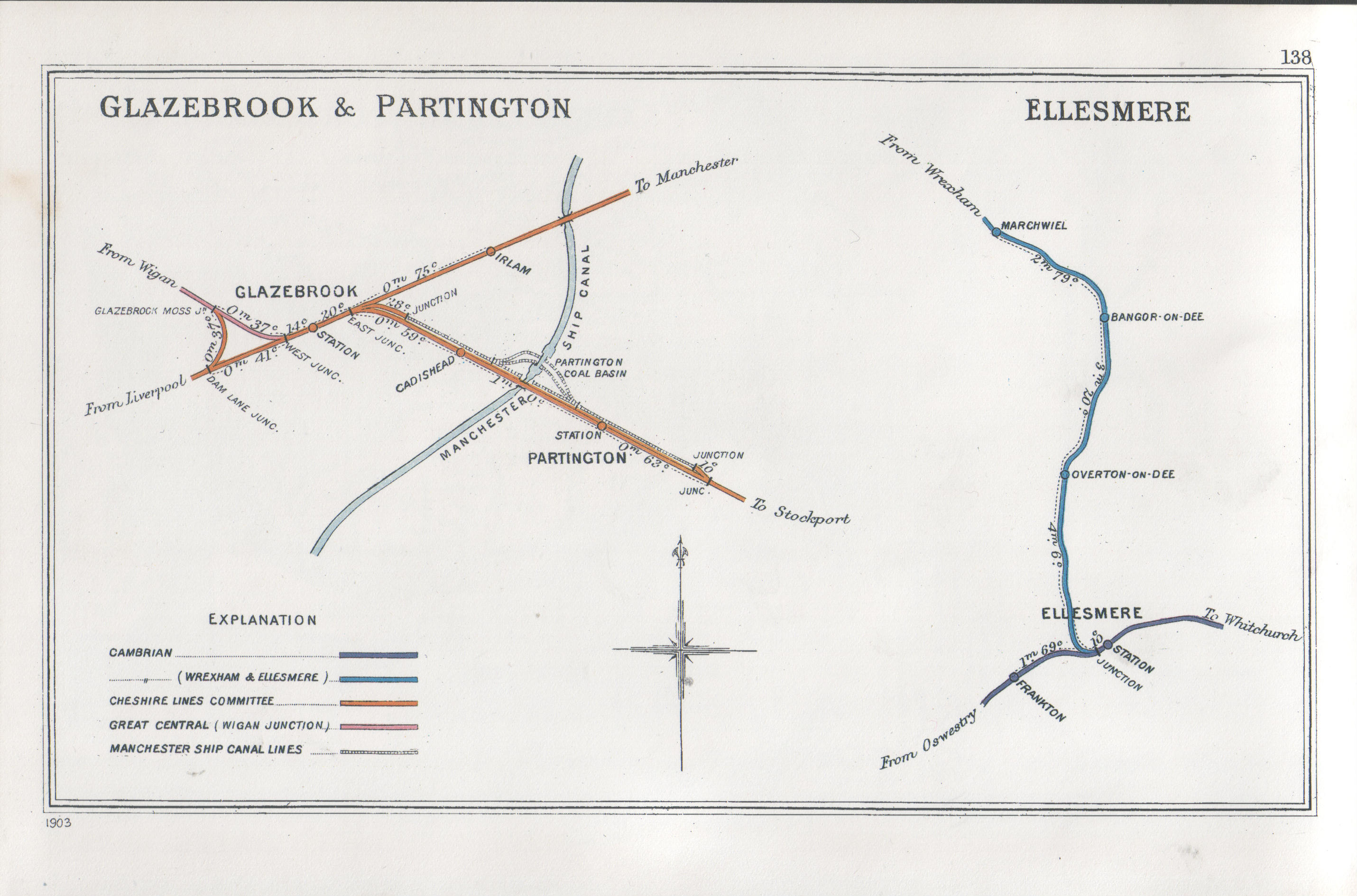
Railway junctions around Cheshire: Glazebrook & Partington; Ellesmere

The Glazebrook East Junction to Skelton Junction line was part of Cheshire Lines Committee (CLC), as a branch line of their main Liverpool–Manchester lines. The line carried on through Skelton Junction and terminated at Stockport Tiviot Dale.

It opened in 1873, serving the towns of Cadishead, Partington and West Timperley. It joined the Manchester, South Junction and Altrincham Railway (MSJ&AR) at Skelton Junction, which was also part of the CLC at this time. In the 1890s, the line was deviated due to the building of the Manchester Ship Canal. It was raised on an embankment around a mile in length from Glazebrook East Junction to be high enough to clear the Ship Canal; the Cadishead Viaduct was built in 1892 to span the canal.

The line saw little change in the late 19th and early 20th centuries, and it remained part of the CLC in the 1923 Grouping. On nationalisation, it became part of the London Midland Region of British Railways in 1948 at the final demise of the CLC.

The line called at the following stations:

- Cadishead
- Partington
- West Timperley.

As part of the London Midland region, it remained a busy line with trains from Liverpool Central and Warrington Central up until the mid-1960s. It was only on the withdrawal of these stopping passenger services in 1964 that all of the stations closed along the line. The line carried on as a freight-only line until 1983, when the Cadishead Viaduct was in need of serious and costly repair; British Rail decided to close the viaduct and mothball the line rather than repairing it. The tracks were lifted in the mid-1980s from Glazebrook to Partington.

As the line was closed prior to the privatisation of British Rail, only Glazebrook East Junction and the line from south of Partington to Skelton Junction were passed over into Railtrack's ownership; this was passed on to Network Rail upon its creation in 2002.

The trackbed from Cadishead to Partington remains as part of the Historical Railways Estate.

== The line today ==
Glazebrook East Junction is still intact and remains part of the national network. The junction towards Cadishead on the original deviation is also still in place with a powered signal lamp showing a permanent red signal. This short section of track from the still-live passing loop at Glazebrook East Junction towards Cadishead, on the original non-deviated line, is permanently point locked. The short section ends near a barrow crossing shortly before a bridge carrying a bridleway above.

The tracks from Skelton Junction to the south east of Partington were left and remained intact for chemical trains for a local chemical plant; these trains continued to use this route until 10 October 1993. This part of the line is intact but disused; the signal lamps at Skelton Junction remain powered on red. In 2005, this part of the track saw some work; vegetation clearance took place for the line to reopen for freight but this did not subsequently take place.

== Future: reopening plans ==
In 2010, the Liberal Democrats announced plans to reopen thousands of miles of disused and abandoned tracks, and it was hoped this line would reopen sometime in the future. This appeared to be an easy process as all the infrastructure of the line was still in place, bar the tracks and signalling. However, it would cost millions of pounds to bring Cadishead Viaduct up to a safe and usable standard, along with all the other decaying bridges along the line, which have seen little or no maintenance in the time since the line was closed.

In 2017, businessman Neil McArthur launched a campaign to reopen the line as a heritage railway, with an adjoining footpath and cycle track.

In January 2019, the Campaign for Better Transport released a report identifying the line as Priority 2 for reopening; this category is for those lines which require further development or a change in circumstances, such as housing developments.

In March 2020, a bid was made to the first round of the Restoring Your Railway fund for a feasibility study into reopening the railway line, but this was unsuccessful.

In April 2020, Railfuture published a proposal examining the reinstatement of the route as a freight bypass to relieve congestion on the Castlefield corridor in central Manchester. A revised study produced with consultancy Railfreight Solutions in August 2020 evaluated routing freight trains via Skelton Junction and Carrington to provide western rail access to Trafford Park, alongside potential future freight terminal capacity on the former chemical works site at Carrington Park.

The corridor has also been referenced in connection with the New Carrington masterplan and the Greater Manchester Transport Strategy 2040 as a potential sustainable transport corridor. In November 2026, Trafford Council's planning committee approved plans for the approximately £130 million Carrington Relief Road to support planned housing and employment growth in the area, while no funded scheme is in place to reinstate rail services along the Glazebrook–Skelton alignment.
