= Partington railway station =

Former railway station in Greater Manchester, England

Partington
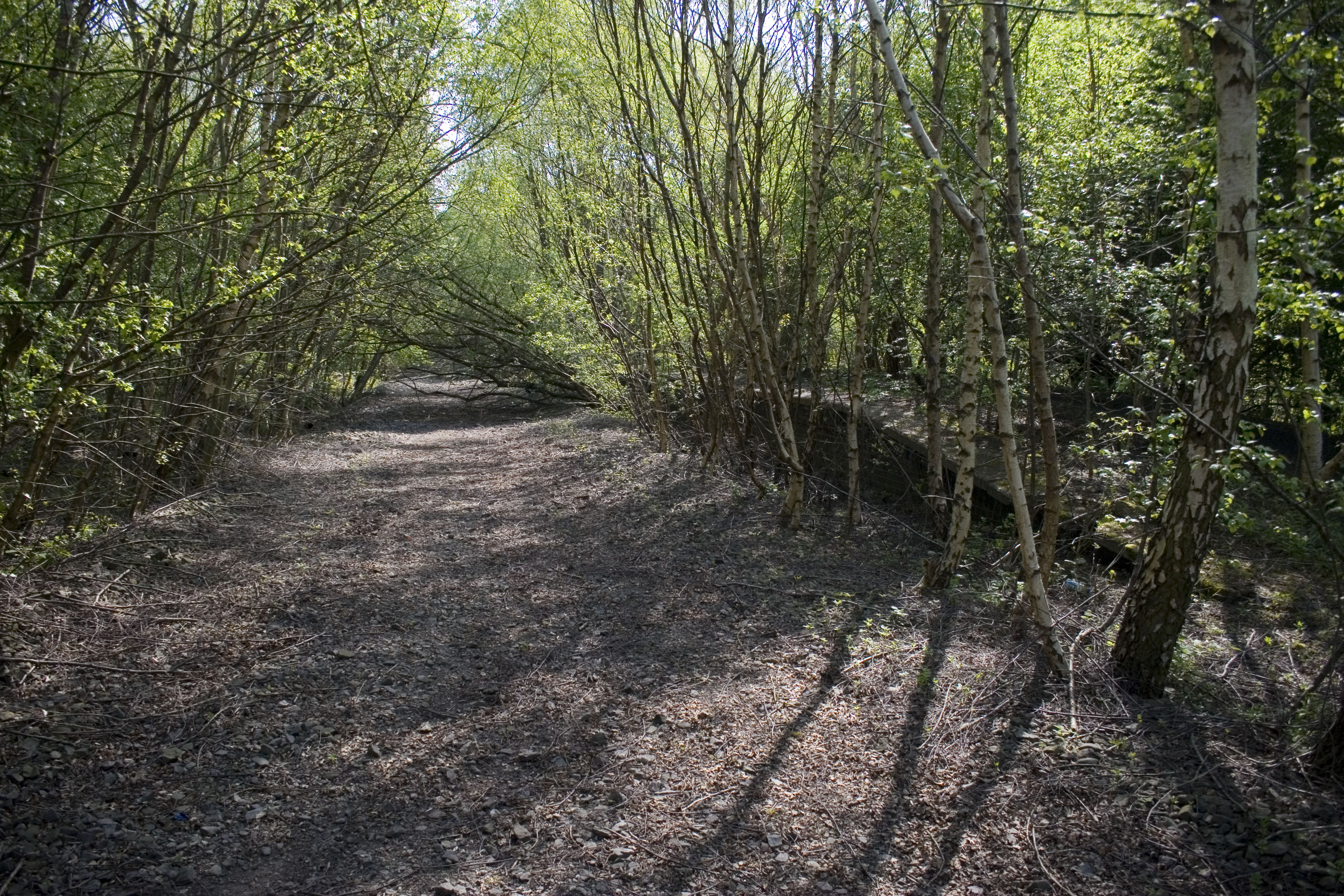
- Remains of Partington station (2009)

General information
- Location: Partington, Metropolitan Borough of Trafford, England
- Coordinates: 53°25′18″N 2°25′03″W
- Grid reference: SJ724917
- Platforms: 2

Other information
- Status: Disused

History
- Original company: Cheshire Lines Committee
- Pre-grouping: Cheshire Lines Committee
- Post-grouping: Cheshire Lines Committee

Key dates
- May 1874: Station opened
- 29 May 1893: Station resited
- 30 November 1964: Station closed
Location

Partington railway station was a stop on the Cheshire Lines Committee route between Warrington Central and Stockport Tiviot Dale. It served the locality between 1874 and 1964.

== History ==
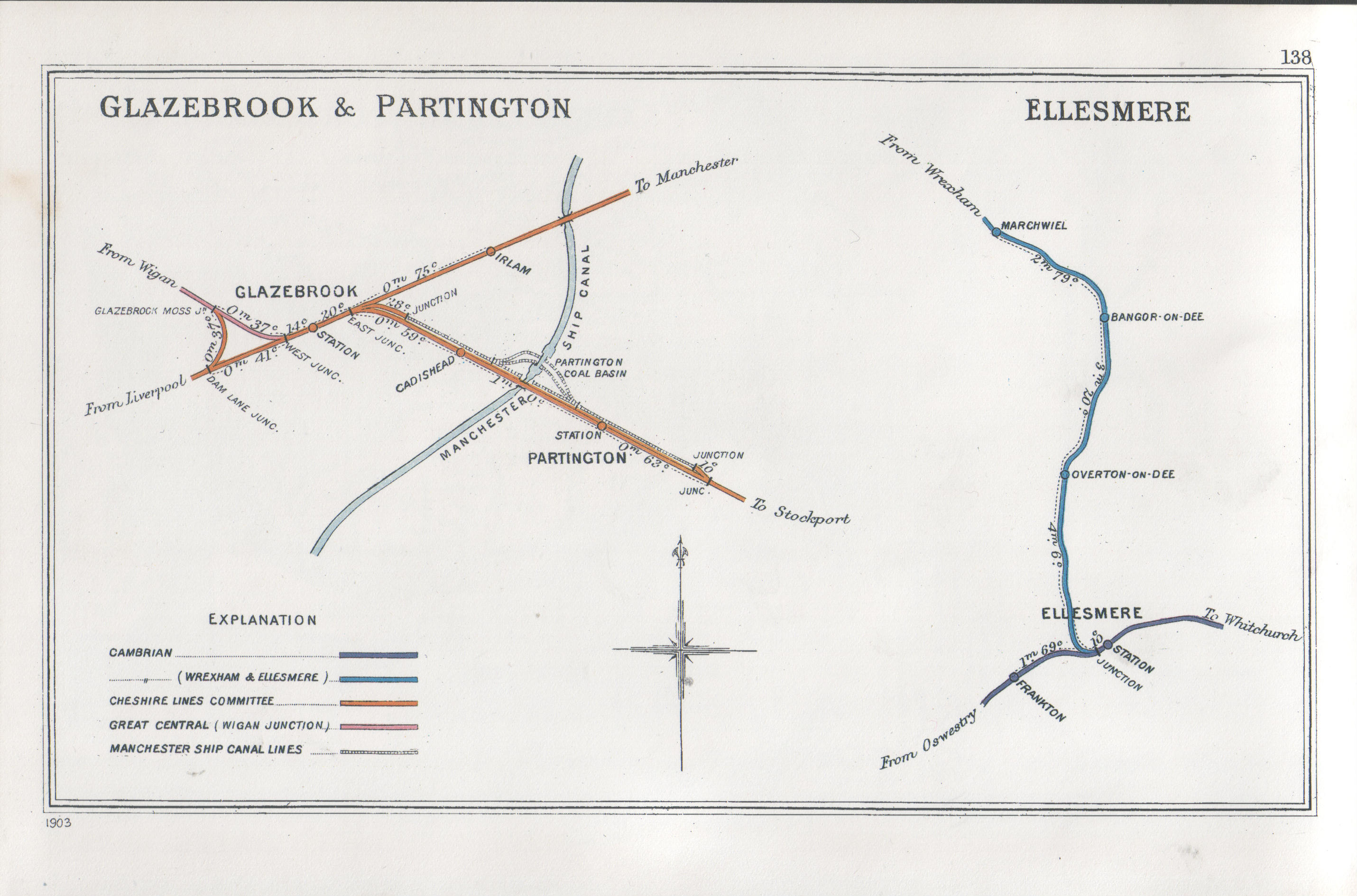
A 1903 Railway Clearing House map showing (left) railways in the vicinity of Partington

The line between Skelton West Junction and Cressington Junction was opened for goods traffic on 1 March 1873, with passenger trains beginning on 1 August 1873. The first station named Partington was opened on that line in May 1874.

The construction of the Manchester Ship Canal, which was to cross the line between Partington and Cadishead, meant that the railway had to be raised by 43 feet (13 m) in order to give a 75-foot (23 m) clearance for shipping. A new line, parallel to the old but slightly to the south-west, was built on embankments formed using the soil excavated from the new canal; it included the new Cadishead Viaduct. The new line was brought into use for goods traffic on 27 February 1893.

A new Partington station was built on the line and passenger traffic was transferred from the old line to the new on 29 May 1893, in plenty of time for the opening of the Ship Canal on 1 January 1894. The new station was 191 miles 23 chains (191.3 mi; 307.8 km) from London St Pancras and 26 miles 36 chains (26.5 mi; 42.6 km) from Liverpool Central.

The second station was closed on 30 November 1964.

Preceding station	Disused railways	Following station
Cadishead; Line and station closed	Cheshire Lines Committee; Glazebrook East Junction to Skelton Junction Line	West Timperley; Line and station closed

== The site today ==
The station buildings were demolished soon after its closure. The platforms are extant, within an overgrown abandoned site.
