= Cadishead railway station =

Disused railway station in England

Coordinates: 53.42749°N 2.43717°W

Cadishead

General information
- Location: Cadishead, Salford; England
- Platforms: 2

Other information
- Status: Disused

History
- Original company: Cheshire Lines Committee
- Pre-grouping: Cheshire Lines Committee
- Post-grouping: Cheshire Lines Committee

Key dates
- 1 September 1873: Opened as Cadishead
- 1879: Closed
- 29 May 1893: New station opened on deviation also called Cadishead
- 30 November 1964: Closed
Location

Cadishead railway station was a railway station on the Cheshire Lines Committees Glazebrook East Junction to Skelton Junction Line serving the village of Cadishead, near Irlam, Greater Manchester.

There were 2 stations that carried the name Cadishead, the first opened on 1 September 1873. It was an early closure however, being very close to Irlam railway station located 1 mile away, it closed on 1 August 1879.

The second station that carried the name was built in 1892, and opened to passengers on 29 May 1893. It was also on the same line, however the need for the new station was due to the building of the Manchester Ship Canal which necessitated the line to be deviated and built up from Glazebrook East Junction to clear the new ship canal.

Under the regrouping the station remained as part of CLC up until 1948. It served the local steel works and other local industries, with people travelling every day from Timperley and beyond.

By 1959 the station's patronage was falling: only 60 people a week were using it. At this time only 11 trains called at the station in the direction of Liverpool (via Glazebrook East Junction) although most only went as far as Warrington Central, and the other 6 towards Stockport. It was already being touted for closure by the BTC around 1959, although it managed to survive another five years.

The station finally closed for good on 28 November 1964, as it had been named along with the other two stations on the line in Beeching's 1963 report.

The line through the station however lasted as a goods only line until 1983 when extensive repairs to the Cadishead Viaduct were required. This track was then lifted in the late 1980s and left to decay.

The station at Cadishead is still extant however, although heavily overgrown and in a sorry state of repair.

Preceding station	Disused railways	Following station
Glazebrook; Line closed, station open	Cheshire Lines Committee; Glazebrook East Junction to Skelton Junction Line	Partington; Line and station closed
