= West Timperley railway station =

Former railway station in England

Coordinates: 53.4033°N 2.3516°W

West Timperley
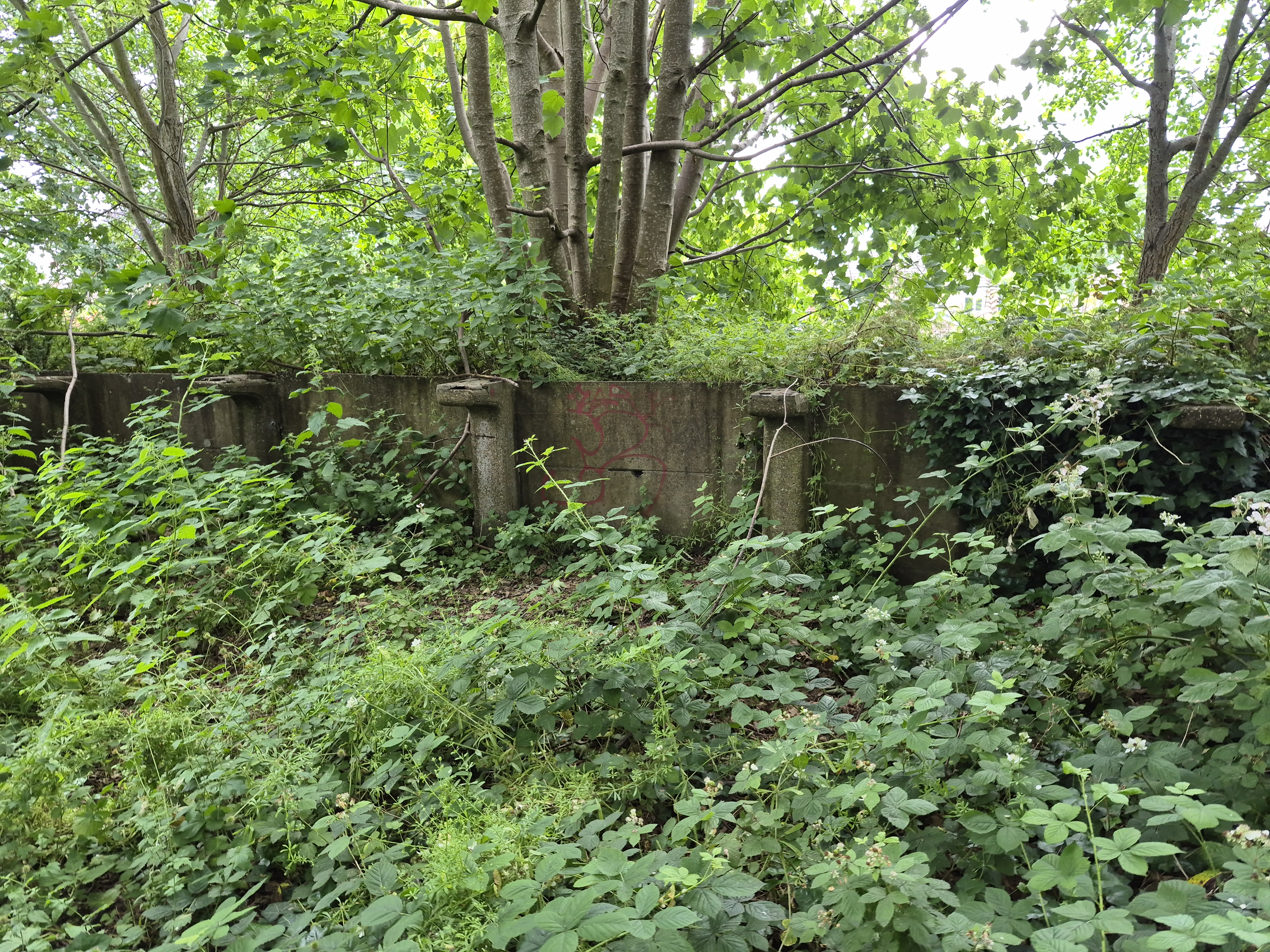
- West Timperley Station in June 2026

General information
- Location: Broadheath, Cheshire; England
- Platforms: 2

Other information
- Status: Closed

History
- Original company: Cheshire Lines Committee
- Pre-grouping: Cheshire Lines Committee
- Post-grouping: Cheshire Lines Committee

Key dates
- 2 September 1873: Station opened
- 30 November 1964: Station closed
Location

West Timperley railway station was situated on the Glazebrook East Junction–Skelton Junction line of the Cheshire Lines Committee between Glazebrook and Stockport Tiviot Dale. It served the locality between 1873 and 1964.

== Construction, opening and location of the station ==
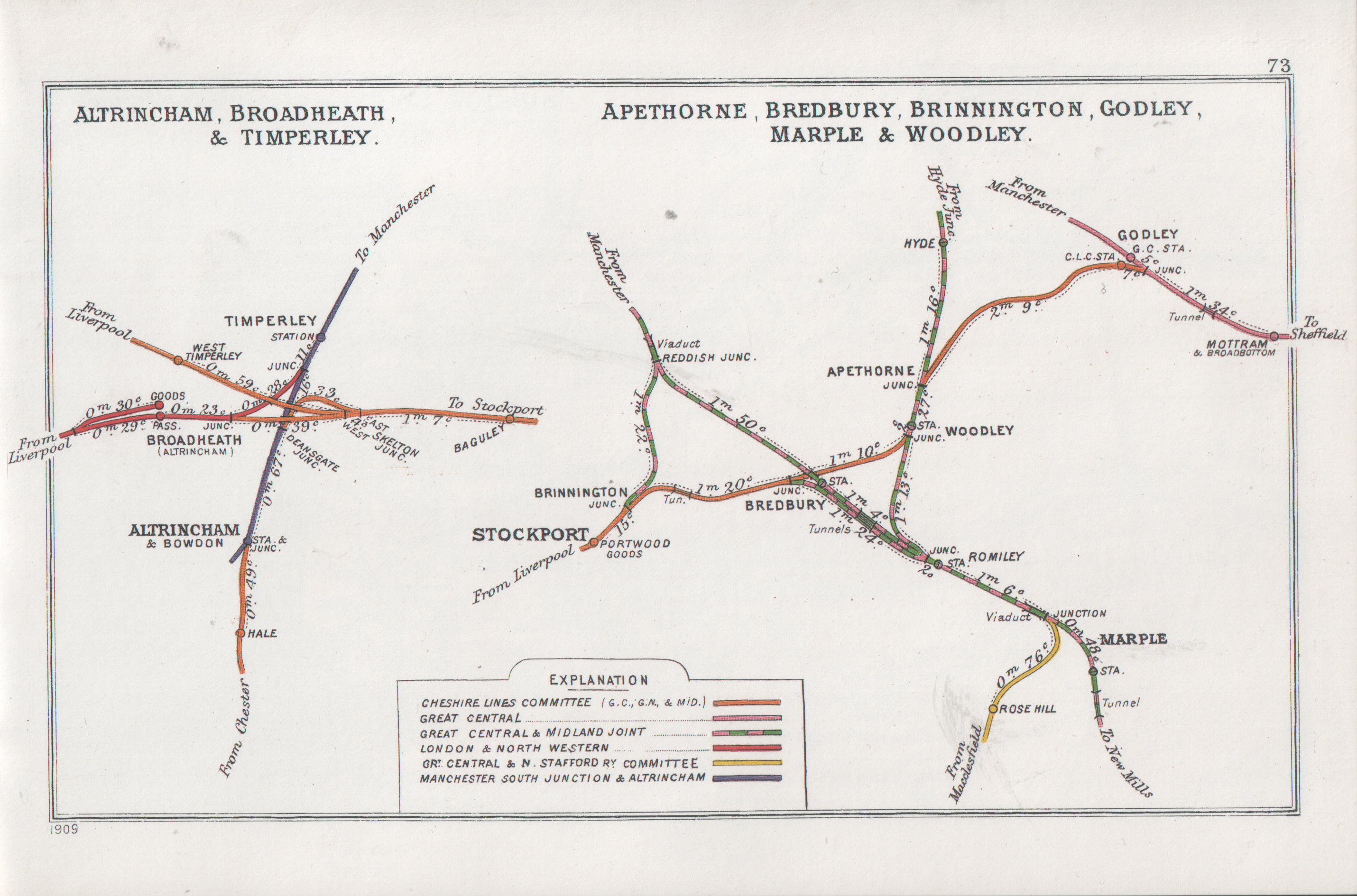
Railway junction diagram (left) showing West Timperley on the line from Liverpool to Stockport

The station was built by the Cheshire Lines Committee (CLC) and opened for passengers on 2 September 1873. It was sometimes referred to as West Timperley for Altrincham and Bowdon in some railway timetables. The station was located immediately west of the A56 Manchester Road in Broadheath near to West Timperley at a point just north of the road junction with Lindsell Road, and just south-west of the point where Timperley Brook runs under Manchester Road which forms the Broadheath - Timperley boundary. It was named West Timperley to differentiate it from the other station in Broadheath. The CLC line was elevated on an embankment here and crossed the A56 by an overbridge.

== Railway Map of the Timperley and Altrincham area ==
To the west the track still exists as far as Partington, where it has been cut off, preventing access across the Manchester Ship Canal. The track to the east continues to Skelton Junction where it joins the Altrincham to Stockport line.

== Ownership of the station ==
The CLC operated the station from 1873 until 1948. From 1 January 1923, the CLC was owned by the London and North Eastern Railway (two-thirds) and the London Midland and Scottish Railway (one-third), but continued to operate as a separate entity. On nationalisation of the UK railway system on 1 January 1948, the station became part of British Railways London Midland Region.

== Train service from the station ==
The CLC operated passenger trains to West Timperley station from Stockport Tiviot Dale in the east, continuing to Warrington Central and Liverpool Central to the west. Passenger trains on the line were withdrawn by British Railways on 30 November 1964.
