= Listed buildings in Irlam =

Irlam is a town in the City of Salford Metropolitan Borough, Greater Manchester, England. The town and the area of Cadishead contain three listed buildings that are recorded in the National Heritage List for England. All the listed buildings are designated at Grade II, the lowest of the three grades, which is applied to "buildings of national importance and special interest". They consist of two 17th-century houses and a war memorial.

== Buildings ==
Name and location	Photograph	Date	Notes
Great Woolden Hall; 53.43727°N 2.46159°W	—	17th century	A brick house with a slate roof, later altered, extended and divided into three dwellings. There are two storeys with attics, five bays, the outer bays being gabled, and rear gabled wings. On the front is a porch, most of the windows are casements, and in the right return are two blocked mullioned windows.
155A Liverpool Road; 53.42551°N 2.43729°W	—	Late 17th century (probable)	A house in rendered brick with a thatched roof, it has two storeys, three bays, and a lean-to extension on the left. The windows are casements, and in the roof trusses are wattle and daub panels.
Irlam and Cadishead war memorial 53.44242°N 2.42103°W	—	1949	The war memorial incorporates a bronze statue by John Cassidy that was created for the former First World War memorial. The rest of the memorial is in York stone, and consists of a pedestal with a plinth and a frieze with an inscribed stone plaque. On the pedestal is the statue depicting a Winged Victory. Flanking the pedestal are stone walls with an inscription, and bronze plaques with inscriptions and the names of those lost in the two World Wars.
