= Neil McArthur =

Neil McArthur may refer to:

- Neil McArthur (footballer) (1898–1974), New Zealand football player
- Neil McArthur (businessman) (born 1956/57), British businessman
- Robert Neil McArthur, Canadian politician
