= Commons Select Committee of Privileges =

UK House of Commons committee

The Commons Select Committee of Privileges is a Committee appointed by the House of Commons to consider specific matters relating to privileges referred to it by the House.

It came into being on 7 January 2013 as one half of the replacements for the Committee on Standards and Privileges. The latter committee was divided into the Committee on Standards and Committee of Privileges in order that the Standards Committee might employ lay members.

== Chairs ==
Committee chairs include those listed below.

Name	Start	End	Party	Constituency
Kevin Barron	15 January 2013	23 October 2018	Labour	Rother Valley
Kate Green	23 October 2018	6 November 2019	Labour	Stretford and Urmston
Chris Bryant	19 May 2020	14 June 2022	Labour	Rhondda
Harriet Harman	29 June 2022	30 May 2024	Labour	Camberwell and Peckham
Alberto Costa	5 November 2024	present	Conservative	South Leicestershire

== Membership ==
As of September 2026, the members of the committee were as follows:

Member	Party	Constituency
Alberto Costa MP (Chair)	Conservative	South Leicestershire
James Asser MP	Labour	West Ham and Beckton
Paula Barker MP	Labour	Liverpool Wavertree
Gill Furniss MP	Labour	Sheffield Brightside and Hillsborough
Anna Sabine MP	Liberal Democrats	Frome and East Somerset
Dr Neil Shastri-Hurst MP	Conservative	Solihull West and Shirley
Gareth Snell MP	Labour and Co-operative	Stoke-on-Trent Central

=== Changes since 2024 ===
Date	Outgoing member and party	Constituency	→	New member and party	Constituency	Source
3 March 2025	Mark Ferguson MP (Labour)	Gateshead Central and Whickham	→	Michael Wheeler MP (Labour)	Worsley and Eccles	Hansard
24 March 2025	Melanie Onn MP (Labour)	Great Grimsby and Cleethorpes	→	Gill Furniss MP (Labour)	Sheffield Brightside and Hillsborough	Hansard
10 September 2026	Michael Wheeler MP (Labour)	Worsley and Eccles	→	James Asser MP (Labour)	West Ham and Beckton	Hansard

== 2019–2024 Parliament ==
As of March 2023, the members of the committee were as follows:

Member	Party	Constituency
Harriet Harman MP (Chair)	Labour	Camberwell and Peckham
Andy Carter MP	Conservative	Warrington South
Alberto Costa MP	Conservative	South Leicestershire
Allan Dorans MP	Scottish National Party	Ayr, Carrick and Cumnock
Sir Charles Walker MP	Conservative	Broxbourne
Yvonne Fovargue MP	Labour	Makerfield
Sir Bernard Jenkin MP	Conservative	Harwich and North Essex

== 2017–2019 Parliament ==
Member	Party	Constituency
Kate Green MP (Chair)	Labour	Stretford and Urmston
Sir Paul Beresford MP	Conservative	Mole Valley
Douglas Chapman MP	Scottish National Party	Dunfermline and West Fife
Bridget Phillipson MP	Labour	Houghton and Sunderland South
Gary Streeter MP	Conservative	South West Devon
John Stevenson MP	Conservative	Carlisle
Sir Christopher Chope MP	Conservative	Christchurch

== Investigation into Boris Johnson ==
The Privileges Committee of the House of Commons had a parliamentary injury over the investigation into Boris Johnson's breach of lockdown rules during the COVID-19 pandemic, concerning four specific assertions made by the then Prime Minister Boris Johnson at Prime Minister's Questions about "the legality of activities in 10 Downing Street and the Cabinet Office under Covid regulations", events commonly referred to as Partygate. The investigation is concerned with whether Johnson misled the Commons when he made these statements.

The Committee published their final report on 15 June. Johnson resigned over the investigation after having been sent a draft copy of the committee's report. The Committee had voted on the final report text and unanimously supported it. They concluded that Johnson had deliberately misled the House, a contempt of Parliament. They said that, had he still been an MP, they would have recommended a 90 day suspension. If that had happened, it would have been the second longest suspension since 1949.

The Committee concluded that Johnson's actions were "more serious" because they were committed when he was Prime Minister. They noted that there was no precedent for a PM being found to have deliberately misled Parliament. The report stated that Johnson tried to "rewrite the meaning" of COVID rules "to fit his own evidence" for example that "a leaving gathering or a gathering to boost morale was a lawful reason to hold a gathering". They concluded he was guilty of further contempt of Parliament and that he breached confidentiality requirements by criticising the Committee's provisional findings when he resigned. They said he was complicit in a "campaign of abuse" against those investigating him.

The Commons debated the report on 19 June 2023. Labour forced a vote and the Commons voted 354 to 7 in support, with a large number of abstentions. This was an absolute majority of the Commons. 118 Conservative MPs, including 15 ministers, voted for the report and 225 abstained. Prime Minister Rishi Sunak had earlier said he had other commitments, and did not attend the debate and refused to say how he would have voted.
