= GLZ =

GLZ may refer to:

- Gilze-Rijen Air Base, in the Netherlands
- Glazebrook railway station, in England
- Army Radio, Israeli Army Radio, known as GLZ (גלצ)
- Galgalatz, an Israeli radio station operated by Army Radio
