= Hollins Green =

Housing estate in Cheshire, England

Coordinates: 53.414°N 2.464°W

- Location within Cheshire
- OS grid reference: SJ696908
- Civil parish: Rixton-with-Glazebrook
- Unitary authority: Warrington
- Ceremonial county: Cheshire
- Region: North West
- Country: England
- Sovereign state: United Kingdom
- Post town: WARRINGTON
- Postcode district: WA3
- Dialling code: 0161
- Police: Cheshire
- Fire: Cheshire
- Ambulance: North West
- UK Parliament: Warrington North

Hollins Green is a village on the eastern edge of Warrington, in the Warrington district, in the ceremonial county of Cheshire and formerly in the historic county of Lancashire, England. The village is in the civil parish of Rixton-with-Glazebrook; the ecclesiastical parish is Hollinfare.

== Amenities ==
The estate houses St Helen's CofE Primary School as well as the Pre-School. The children of Hollins Green generally attend Culcheth High School upon leaving St Helen's, as it is one of the feeder schools.

The estate has two pubs (the Red Lion and the Black Swan), a shop, a pond, a barbers, a dog groomers, a church hall and a separate community hall.

== Transport ==
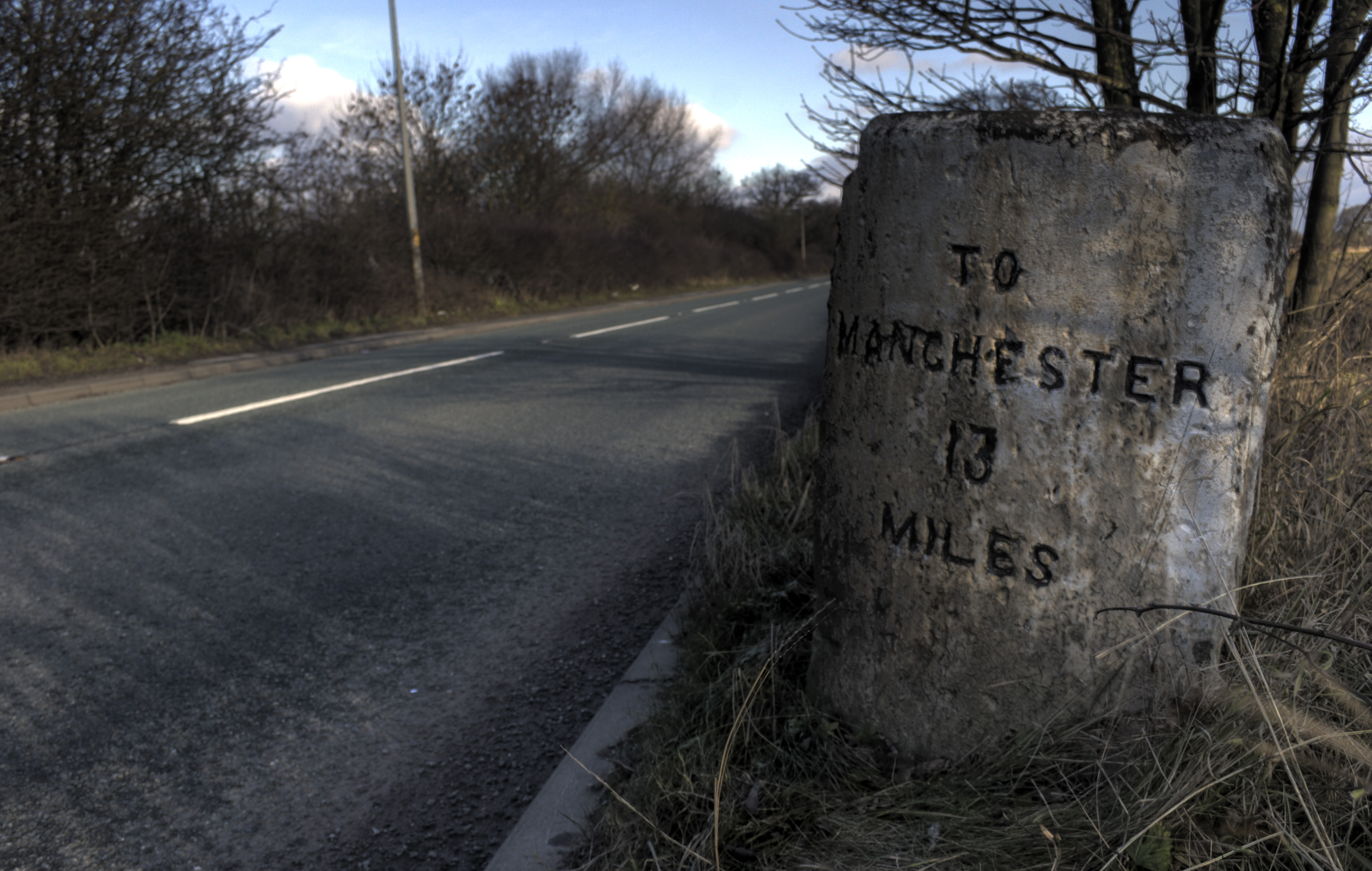
A milestone along the former Warrington and Irlam Turnpike, now known as the A57 Manchester Road. The opposite side of the stone gives the distance to Warrington.

Hollins Green is served by the number 100 bus, provided by Bee Network Stagecoach Manchester, travelling between Manchester Shudehill Interchange and Warrington Interchange. The 100 runs every hour towards the Trafford Centre and Manchester. Glazebrook railway station is within close reach of the village and can be used to commute to Manchester, Warrington and Liverpool. The station is served by Northern Trains.

== Other features ==
Rixton Clay Pits at the west of the is a former clay extraction site; it is now a nature reserve and a Site of Special Scientific Interest.

The estate also has a brickworks, the moated site of Rixton Old Hall, Rixton New Hall, Ramswood Garden Centre, St Helen's Church (C of E) and churchyard (on an ancient circular site bordered by a footpath called 'The Weint'), a cross commemorating those killed in both world wars, and a Methodist chapel.

The Glaze Brook joins the River Mersey just north-east of Hollins Green; this stretch of the Mersey was widened to form part of the Manchester Ship Canal.

== In literature ==
The estate and surroundings are the setting for the fictional village of Moss Ferry, in the semi-autobiographical novel Manchester Fourteen Miles by former resident Margaret Penn.

== See also ==
- Listed buildings in Rixton-with-Glazebrook
