= Listed buildings in Partington =

Partington is a civil parish in the Metropolitan Borough of Trafford, Greater Manchester, England. The parish contains three listed buildings that are recorded in the National Heritage List for England. All the listed buildings are designated at Grade II, the lowest of the three grades, which is applied to "buildings of national importance and special interest". The parish contains the town of Partington, and the listed buildings consist of a farmhouse, a set of stocks, and a church.

== Buildings ==
Name and location	Photograph	Date	Notes
Stocks; 53.42014°N 2.42766°W	—	18th century	The stocks are on the village green. They consist of two stone stock-ends with chamfered corners and round tops. They are grooved and contain 20th-century foot restraints.
Erlam Farmhouse; 53.41856°N 2.42953°W	—	Late 18th century	A brick farmhouse on a projecting plinth, with rusticated quoins, a dentilled eaves cornice, and a slate roof. There are two storeys and a 19th-century rear wing. There is a central blocked doorway, above which is a blind window with a segmental arched lintel and a keystone. The windows are sashes with wedge lintels. In the rear wing is a decorative porch and casement windows.
St Mary's Church; 53.42028°N 2.42537°W		1883	The church, designed by George Truefitt in Gothic style, is in stone with tiled roofs and cross finials. It consists of a nave, a chancel and a vestry under a continuous roof, a south porch, and a northeast tower. The tower has three stages, a south doorway with a pointed arch, quatrefoil windows, a timber bell stage, and a square spire with a hipped roof. The windows have pointed arches and are without tracery.
