= Listed buildings in Rixton-with-Glazebrook =

Rixton-with-Glazebrook is a civil parish in the Borough of Warrington in Cheshire, England, to the east of the town of Warrington. It contains seven buildings that are recorded in the National Heritage List for England as designated listed buildings, all of which are listed at Grade II. This grade is the lowest of the three gradings given to listed buildings, applied to "buildings of national importance and special interest". The parish is largely rural, and contains the villages of Hollins Green and Glazebrook. The A57 road runs through the parish, and three of the listed buildings are milestones along this road. The other listed buildings are a church, a war memorial, a railway station, and a former manor house.

Name and location	Photograph	Date	Notes
St Helen's Church, Hollins Green; 53.4161°N 2.4569°W	—	c. 1710	The original building was a chantry chapel founded in about 1497, which later became a chapel of ease. It was extensively remodelled in 1710, and the interior was further remodelled in 1882, and again in 1921. It is a small linear church in red brick, with a stone slate roof. It has a cupola at the west end consisting of an octagonal turret, with Ionic columns, and an ogee-shaped top.
Rixton Old Hall; 53.3998°N 2.4767°W	—	1822	The present building replaced an earlier manor house on a moated site to the north, and has since been converted into use as offices. It is constructed in brick with a slate roof. The building is in two storeys and six bays; these include an octagonal two-storey bay window and a wing at each end. The other windows are sashes.
Milestone; 53.40534°N 2.47577°W		Early 19th century (probable)	A milestone on the south side of the A57 road. It consists of a whitewashed triangular stone with a flat top, inscribed with the distances in miles to Warrington and Manchester.
Milestone; 53.40066°N 2.49773°W		Early 19th century (probable)	A milestone on the south side of the A57 road. It consists of a whitewashed semicircular stone with a flat top and a straight back, inscribed with the distances in miles to Warrington and Manchester.
Milestone, Hollins Green; 53.41403°N 2.45626°W	—	Early 19th century (probable)	A milestone on the east side of the A57 road. It consists of a whitewashed triangular stone with a flat top, inscribed with the distances in miles to Warrington and Manchester.
Glazebrook railway station 53.4282°N 2.4597°W		1872	A railway station built by the Cheshire Lines Committee on its Liverpool to Manchester line. Extensions were made to the rear between 1911 and 1929. The station building is constructed in brick with sandstone dressings, and slate roofs. It originally incorporated a stationmaster's house.
War memorial, Hollins Green; 53.41630°N 2.45733°W		c. 1920	Located in the centre of a road junction in the village, this is a sandstone war memorial consisting of a square column surmounted by a cross. This stands on an inscribed square base, the inscription including the names of those who lost their lives during the two World Wars.
