= TalkTalk Business =

UK business

TalkTalk Business (TalkTalk Business Direct Ltd)
- Company type: Subsidiary
- Industry: Telecommunications
- Predecessor: Pipex; Opal Telecom; Freedom2surf; Nildram; Tiscali Business
- Founded: 2011
- Headquarters: City of Salford, United Kingdom
- Products: Business Fixed line, mobile telephony, Internet services and IT Support
- Parent: TFP Telecoms Limited
- Website: talktalk.business

TalkTalk Business (trading name of TalkTalk Business Direct Ltd) is a business broadband, telephone, mobile phone and IT support provider owned by TFP Telecoms Limited, a holding company owned by TalkTalk shareholders including Sir Charles Dunstone and Toscafund Asset Management. The division supports approximately 180,000 UK businesses, and 350 resellers, that include voice and data specialists, system integrators and carriers.

In 2023, TalkTalk Business was demerged from the wider TalkTalk Group and sold to the group's own shareholders.

== History ==
TalkTalk Business was founded in 1995 by Neil McArthur as Opal Telecoms. TalkTalk Business changed its name from Opal Telecom on 1 February 2011. However it has its origins in many business divisions of telecommunications companies that have been taken over including Pipex, Opal Telecom, Freedom2surf, Nildram and Tiscali.

TalkTalk Group (trading as TalkTalk) was founded in 2003 as a subsidiary of Carphone Warehouse and was de-merged as a standalone company in March 2010.

== Timeline ==
- 1995: Opal Telecom founded
- 2000: Provision of first hosted inbound services
- 2002: Acquired by Carphone Warehouse for £103m
- 2005: Vartec, Telequip and the UK operations of One.Tel acquired
- 2006: Ecocall and Totem acquired
- 2009: TalkTalk and Carphone Warehouse demerge
- 2010: Opal becomes TalkTalk Business to allow it to leverage TalkTalk Group scale and brand. TalkTalk acquires UK operations of Tiscali
- 2011: TalkTalk Business acquired Executel and V-Networks
- 2023: TalkTalk Business is spun-off from the group and sold to the group's own shareholders

== Products ==
TalkTalk Business provides communication products such as voice and broadband connectivity.
