= Cadishead Viaduct =

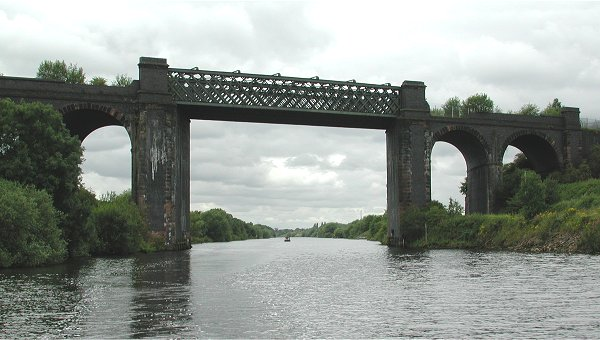
- Cadishead Viaduct – bridge between Cadishead and Partington in Greater Manchester, England.
- Coordinates: 53.4246°N 2.4279°W
- Carries: Railway line
- Crosses: Manchester Ship Canal
- Locale: Cadishead
- Owner: Department for Transport
- Maintained by: National Highways (Historical Railways Estate)

Characteristics
- Material: Black Engineering Brick and Steel
- Longest span: 120 ft (37 m)
- No. of spans: 5
- Clearance below: 75 ft (23 m)

History
- Constructed by: Cheshire Lines Committee
- Opened: 27 February 1893
- Closed: 1984

Location
- Interactive map of Cadishead Viaduct

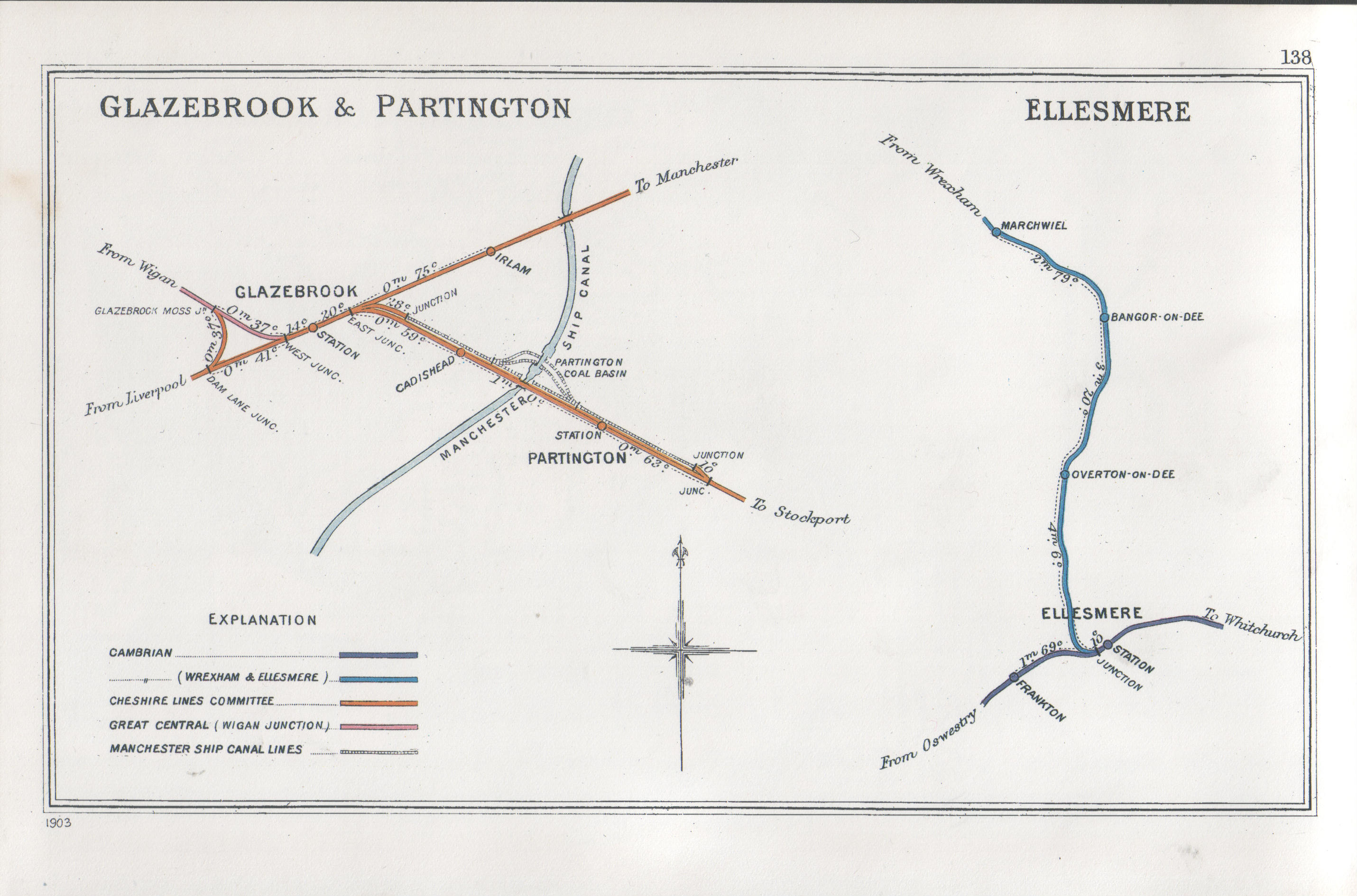
A 1903 Railway Clearing House map showing (left) railways in the vicinity of Cadishead Viaduct

Cadishead Viaduct is a disused railway viaduct of multi-lattice girder construction. It was built in 1892 by the Cheshire Lines Committee to clear the newly built Manchester Ship Canal to carry the new deviation of the Glazebrook to Woodley Main Line. The central span is 40 yards (37 m) long, and the clearance is 75 feet (23 m).

The route opened to goods on 27 February 1893 and to passenger traffic on 29 May 1893.

Following the withdrawal of passenger services in 1964, the line became goods only, and when expensive repairs to the viaduct were needed in the early 1980s, British Rail closed the viaduct and the preceding line towards Glazebrook.

The viaduct is now blocked with containers on each end owing to anti-social behaviour and to stop people walking across it, as the deck of the viaduct is in a very bad state with major corrosion setting in on the soffits and trough decking of the major steel span of the viaduct. The Hamilton Davies Trust proposes to restore the viaduct to operation as a multi-modal route, with the potential to operate a heritage railway across it.

== See also ==
- List of lattice girder bridges in the United Kingdom
- Glazebrook East Junction–Skelton Junction line
