= Adam Neal =

English rugby league footballer

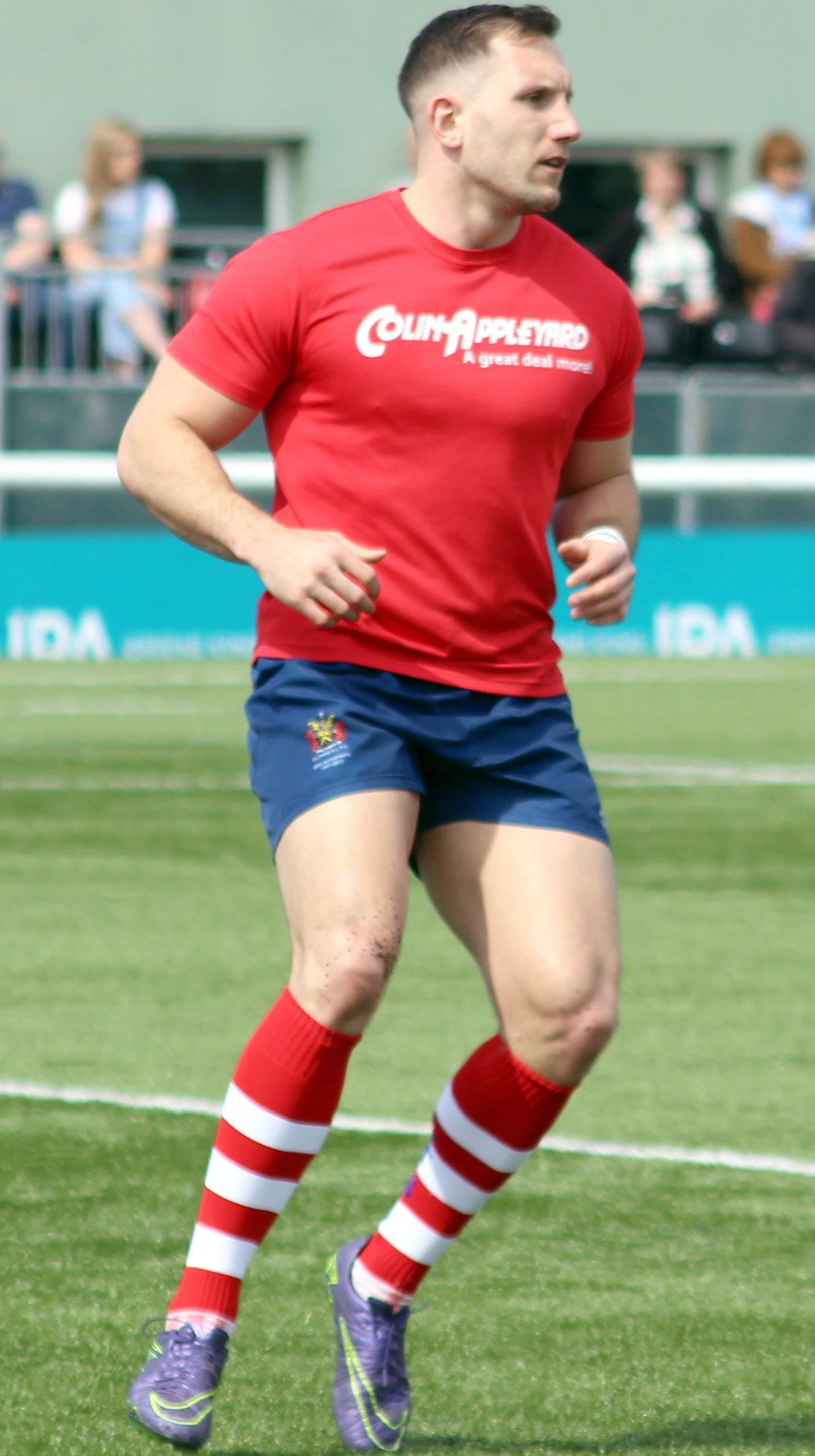

Personal information
- Full name: Adam Neal
- Born: 21 May 1990 (age 36) Irlam, Salford, England
- Height: 6 ft 0 in (1.83 m)
- Weight: 16 st 1 lb (102 kg)

Playing information
- Position: Prop
Club
| Years | Team | Pld | T | G | FG | P |
|---|---|---|---|---|---|---|
| 2008–10 | Warrington Wolves | 1 | 0 | 0 | 0 | 0 |
| 2010(loan) | → Salford City Reds | 6 | 0 | 0 | 0 | 0 |
| 2011–13 | Salford City Reds | 42 | 1 | 0 | 0 | 4 |
| 2015 | Oldham | 21 | 1 | 0 | 0 | 4 |
| 2016 | Sheffield Eagles | 32 | 4 | 0 | 0 | 16 |
| 2017–18 | Oldham | 42 | 5 | 0 | 0 | 20 |
| | Total | 144 | 11 | 0 | 0 | 44 |
- Source: As of 29 June 2021

Adam Neal (born 21 May 1990) is a former English professional rugby league footballer who last played for Oldham in League 1. Neal's position of choice is as a prop.

== Background ==
Neal was born in Irlam, near Salford, England.

== Career ==
He previously played for the Warrington Wolves and Salford City Reds in the Super League and Sheffield Eagles in the Championship. He made his début for Warrington Wolves in the Challenge Cup victory against Leigh Centurions on 20 April 2008.

== Coaching ==
After retiring in 2018 it was reported that he had joined the Oldham RLFC backroom strength and conditioning staff
