= Roxton =

Roxton may refer to one of these places:

Canada

- Roxton, Quebec, a township that surrounds the village of Roxton Falls
- Roxton Falls, Quebec, a village
- Roxton Pond, Quebec, a municipality in La Haute-Yamaska Regional County Municipality

United Kingdom

- Roxton, Bedfordshire, England

United States

- Roxton, Texas, Lamar County, Texas

== See also ==
- Rixton (disambiguation)
