= Partington =

Town and civil parish in Greater Manchester, England

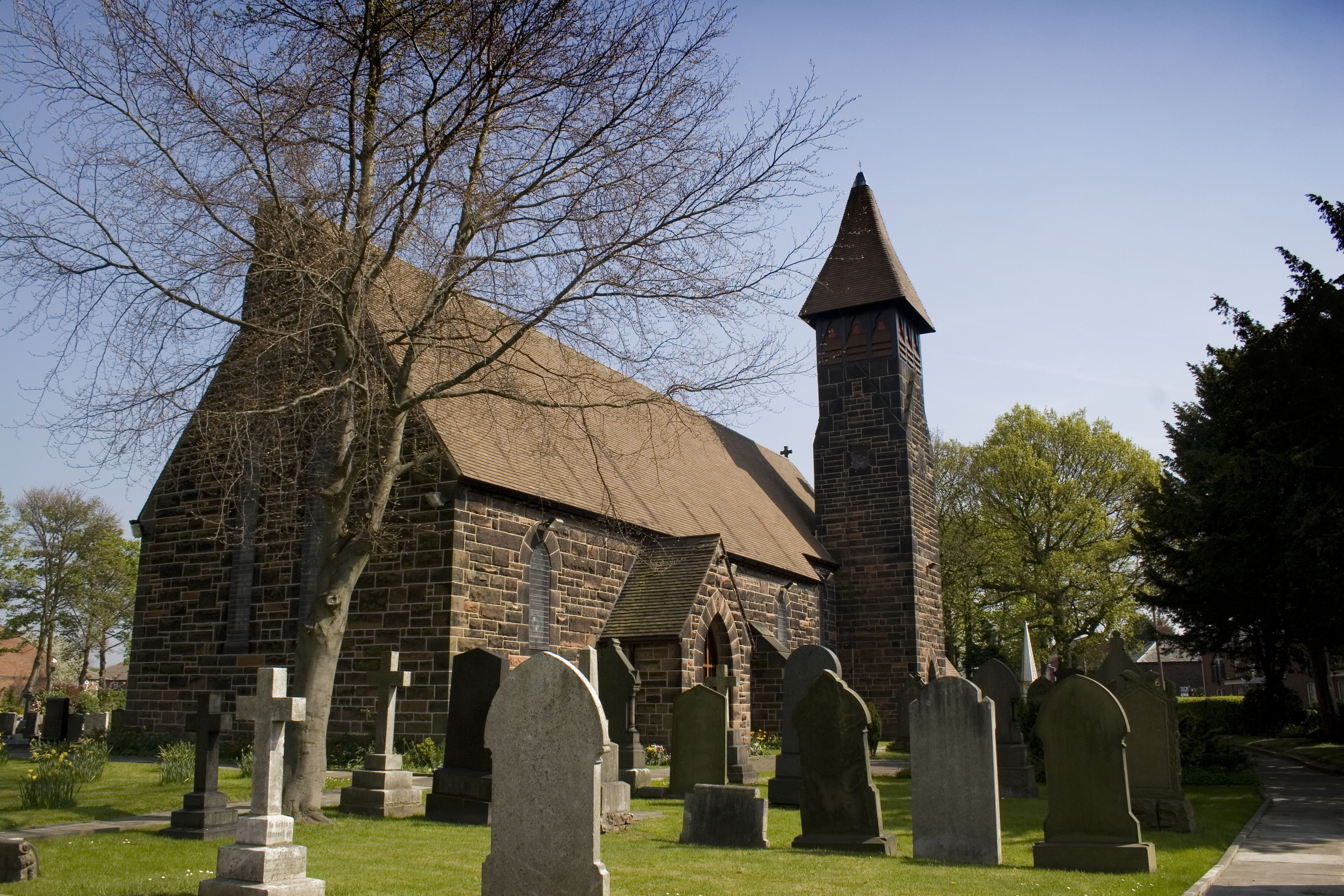
- St Mary's Church

- Location within Greater Manchester
- Population: 7,327 (2001 Census)
  - Density: 5,348/sq mi (2,065/km^{2})
- OS grid reference: SJ715915
- Civil parish: Partington
- Metropolitan borough: Trafford
- Metropolitan county: Greater Manchester
- Region: North West
- Country: England
- Sovereign state: United Kingdom
- Post town: MANCHESTER
- Postcode district: M31
- Dialling code: 0161
- Police: Greater Manchester
- Fire: Greater Manchester
- Ambulance: North West
- UK Parliament: Stretford and Urmston

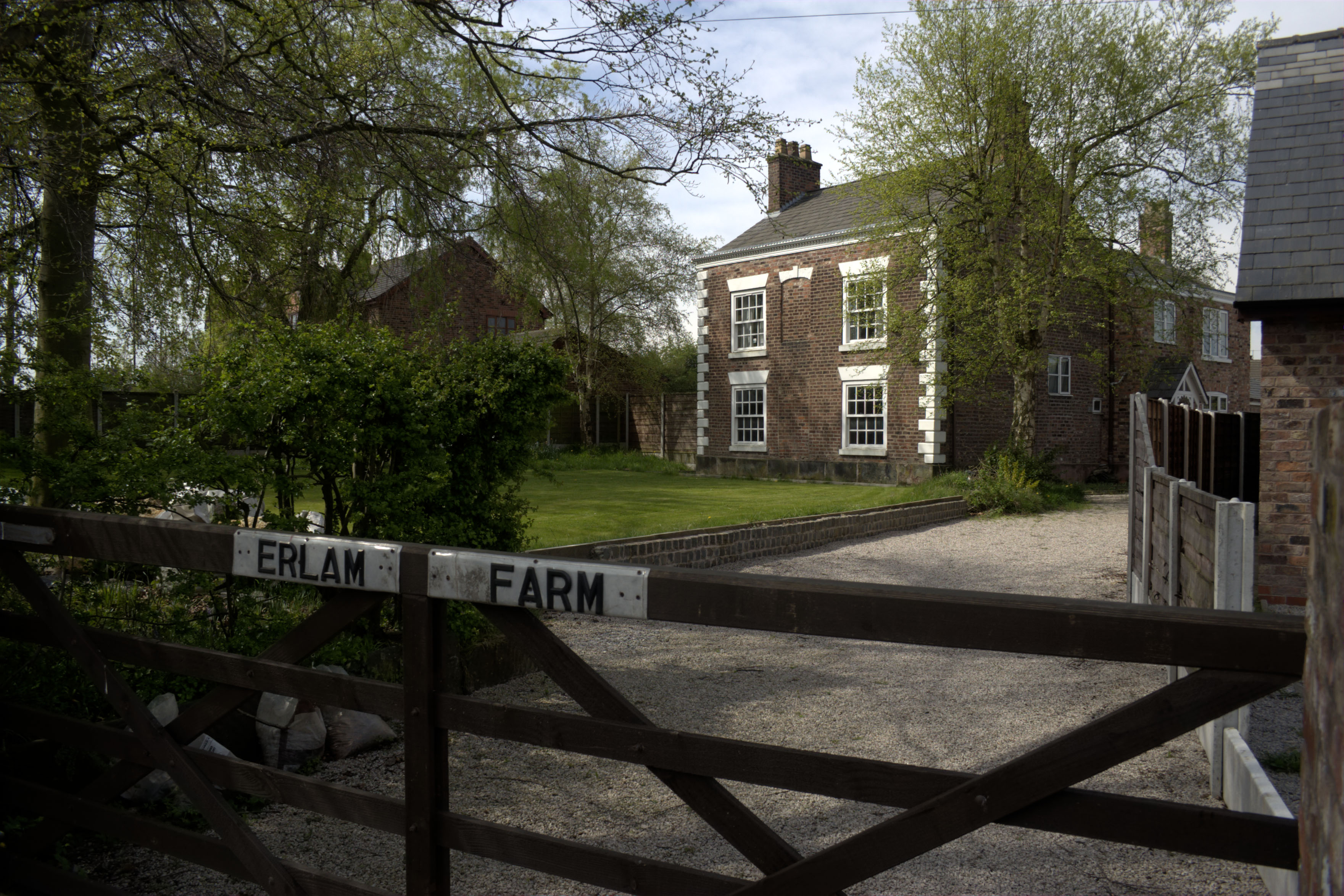
Erlam Farm

Partington is a town and civil parish in the Metropolitan Borough of Trafford, Greater Manchester, England. It is sited ten miles (16 km) south-west of Manchester city centre. Within the boundaries of the historic county of Cheshire, it lies on the southern bank of the Manchester Ship Canal, opposite Cadishead on the northern bank. In 2001 it had a population of 7,327.

The completion of the Manchester Ship Canal in 1894 transformed Partington into a major coal-exporting port and attracted other industries. Until 2007, Shell Chemicals UK operated a major petrochemicals manufacturing complex in Carrington, Partington's closest neighbour to the east. The gas storage facility in the north-eastern corner of the town was once a gasworks and another significant employer.

Shortly after the Second World War, local authorities made an effort to rehouse people away from Victorian slums in inner-city Manchester. An area of Partington became an overspill estate and is now one of the most deprived parts of Greater Manchester. The Cheshire Lines Committee opened a railway line through the town in 1873, but it closed in 1964.

== History ==
Partington, first recorded in 1260, was in the medieval and post-medieval parish of Bowdon. The name derives from Old English: the first element may be a personal name such as Pearta or Pærta, or part "land divided up into partitions" followed by inga, meaning "people of"; the suffix tun means "farmstead". The village consisted of dispersed farmsteads, with no nucleated centre. It was surrounded by wetlands on all sides, reducing the amount of land available for agriculture. According to the hearth tax returns of 1664, Partington had a population of 99.

In 1755, a paper mill on the River Mersey was opened in Partington, the first factory to be established in present-day Trafford. Erlam Farmhouse dates from the late 18th century and is a Grade II listed building. Also protected as a Grade II listed building are the stocks on the village green; its stone pillars date from the 18th century, although the wooden restraints were replaced in the 20th century.

The completion of the Manchester Ship Canal in 1894 transformed Partington into a major coal-exporting port. The canal was widened to 250 feet (76 m) for three-quarters of a mile (1.2 km) to allow for the construction of a coaling basin, equipped with four hydraulic coal hoists. Partington was the nearest port to the Lancashire Coalfields, and brought the south Yorkshire collieries 30 miles (48 km) closer to the sea. Between 1898 and 1911, exports of coal accounted for 53.4 per cent of the total export tonnage carried by the ship canal. The coal trade in turn resulted in Partington becoming a major railway depot and attracted a range of other industries, including the Partington Steel & Iron Company, which was encouraged by the availability of coal to construct a steelworks. The works became a part of the Lancashire Steel Corporation in 1930 and dominated the economy of nearby Irlam until their closure in 1976.

After the Second World War, Partington was extended as an overspill estate.

== Governance ==
The civil parish of Partington was created in the Local Government Act 1894 and has its own town council. Partington became part of the Metropolitan Borough of Trafford in 1974 upon the borough's creation, but was previously in Bucklow Rural District. The town is part of the Bucklow St Martin electoral ward; Partington Parish Council is made up of local residents and ward councillors.

Partington also belongs to the Stretford and Urmston constituency. Since its creation in 1997, the constituency's Member of Parliament has been a member of the Labour Party, Andrew Western being, since 2022, the present incumbent.

== Geography ==
Partington (Note: Partington is sited at the following co-ordinates: 53°25′12″N 2°25′48″W (53.42, −2.43)) lies west of Sale, north-east of the civil parish of Warburton and is on Trafford's northern border with the City of Salford; it is nine miles (14 km) south-west of Manchester city centre. Sinderland Brook runs east–west through the area and the town is about 20 m (66 ft) above sea level on generally flat ground.

Partington's local drift geology is a mixture of alluvial deposits, fluvio-glacial gravel and peat deposited about 10,000 years ago, during the last ice age. The bedrock is Keuper sandstone in the south and Bunter sandstone in the north. The town's climate is generally temperate, like the rest of Greater Manchester. The mean highest and lowest temperatures (13.2 °C (55.8 °F) and 6.4 °C (43.5 °F)) are slightly above the national average, while the annual rainfall (806.6 millimetres (31.76 in)) and average hours of sunshine (1394.5 hours) are respectively above and below the national averages.

== Demography ==
Partington compared
2001 UK census	Partington	Trafford	England
Total population	7,723	205,357	49,138,831
White	96.9%	89.7%	90.9%
Asian	0.9%	4.6%	4.6%
Black	0.6%	0.7%	2.3%

According to the Office for National Statistics, at the time of the United Kingdom Census 2001, Partington had a population of 7,723. The 2001 population density was 5,348 inhabitants per square mile (2,065/km^{2}), with a 100 to 93.1 female-to-male ratio. Of those over 16 years old, 34.7% were single (never married), 34.9% married, and 10.5% divorced. Partington's 3,354 households included 33.5% one-person, 28.7% married couples living together, 8.8% were co-habiting couples, and 16.3% single parents with their children. Of those aged 16–74, 38.9% had no academic qualifications, significantly higher than the averages of Trafford (24.7%) and England (28.9%). It has been described as one of the most deprived places in the Greater Manchester conurbation.

As of the 2001 UK census, 76.8% of Partington's residents reported themselves as being Christian, 0.8% Muslim, 0.2% Hindu, 0.2% Jewish and 0.1% Sikh. It recorded 14.7% as having no religion, 0.1% had an alternative religion and 7.1% did not state their religion.

== Economy ==
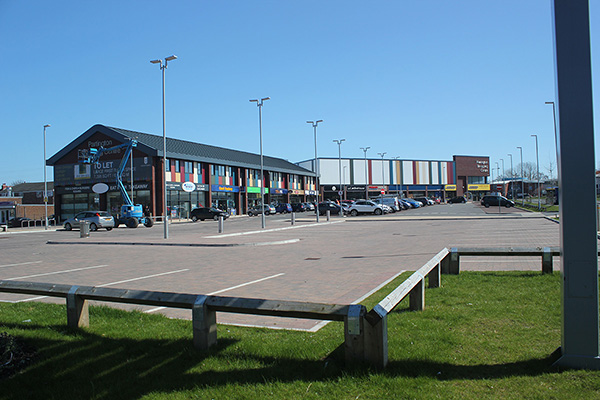
Partington shopping centre

The main shopping area of Partington is on Central Road, in the centre of town. The town also has a traditional market on Smithy Lane.

Spanish company SAICA bought a lease on a disused wharfside site by the Manchester Ship Canal in 2009 to recycle paper into packaging. The plant is the most "advanced, fully integrated facility in the UK". It uses water recycled from the ship canal and its heat and power plant supplies surplus power to the national grid. The plant cost £300 million and production started in January 2012.

Partington compared
2001 UK Census	Partington	Trafford	England
Population of working age	5,553	151,445	35,532,091
Full-time employment	40.2%	43.4%	40.8%
Part-time employment	12.1%	11.9%	11.8%
Self employed	3.9%	8.0%	8.3%
Unemployed	3.6%	2.7%	3.3%
Retired	13.0%	13.9%	13.5%

According to the 2001 UK census, the industry of employment of residents aged 16–74 was 19.3% retail and wholesale, 15.0% manufacturing, 14.7% property and business services, 10.8% health and social work, 9.1% transport and communications, 7.2% construction, 5.2% education, 4.8% hotels and restaurants, 3.8% finance, 3.1% public administration, 1.3% agriculture, 0.7% energy and water supply, 0.1% mining, and 4.9% other. Compared with national figures, Partington had a relatively high percentage of residents working in transport and communications, and a relatively low percentage working in public administration. The census recorded the economic activity of residents aged 16–74, 1.8% students were with jobs, 3.4% students without jobs, 7.7% looking after home or family, 10.6% permanently sick or disabled and 3.8% economically inactive for other reasons. The proportion of those who were permanently sick or disabled in Partington was above the Trafford and England average (5.4% and 6.5% respectively).

== Education ==
Trafford maintains a selective education system, assessed by the 11-plus exam. There are three primary schools and one secondary school in Partington. The oldest school still standing in the town was opened in 1958 and used to be called Partington County Primary School but is now known as Partington Central Academy. There is one other state primary schools at Forest Gate with Academy status. There is also a Roman Catholic school – Our Lady of Lourdes Primary School on Lock Lane. Broadoak School is a secondary school with academy status for pupils aged 11 to 16. Partington Central Academy, Forest Gate and Broadoak School are all a part of The Dean Trust.

== Transport ==
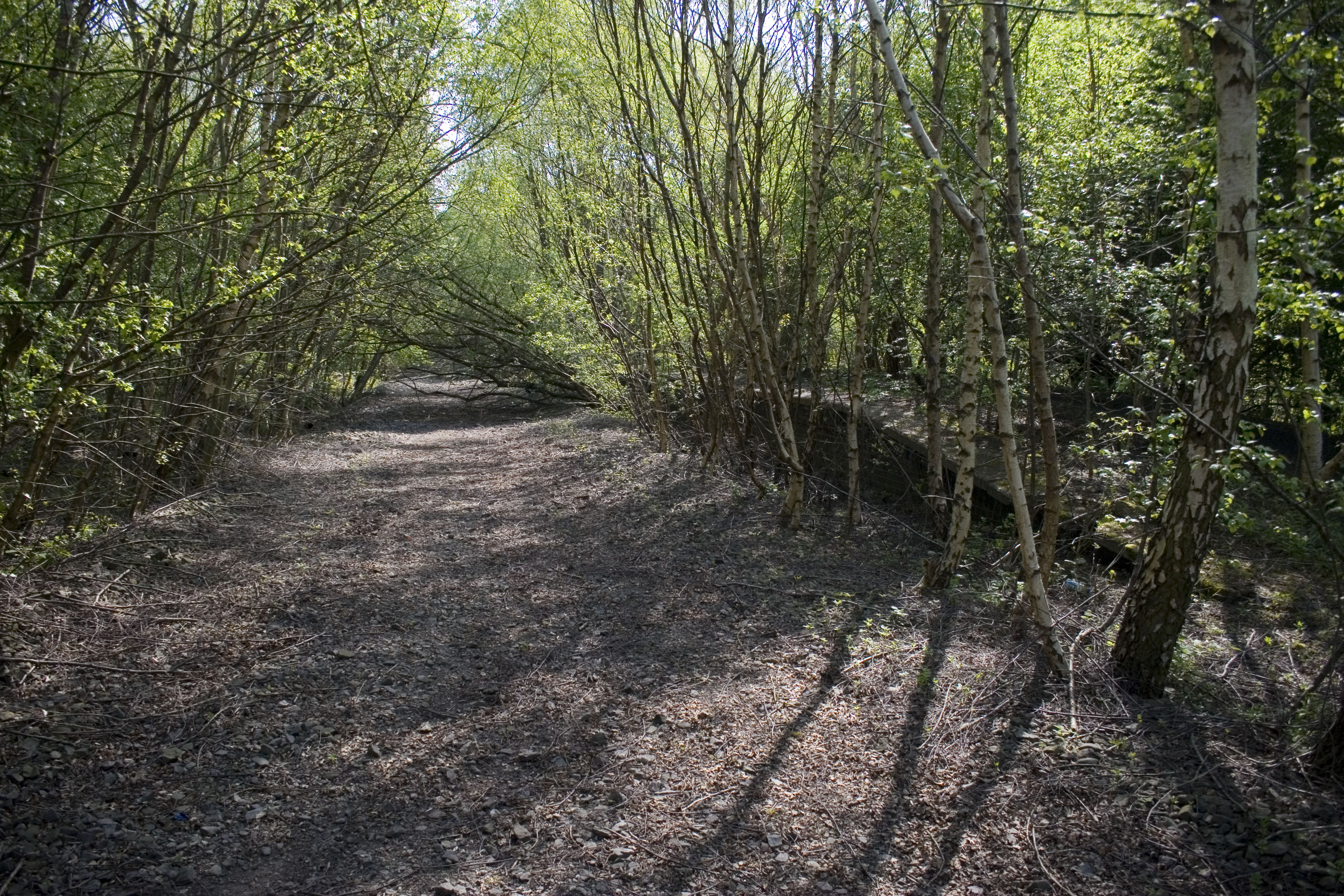
The overgrown remains of Partington railway station, which closed in 1964

Partington's main road is the A6144 between Lymm and the Brooklands area of Sale.

The Manchester Ship Canal also carries some industrial traffic. The nearest road crossing over the canal is at Warburton Bridge, one of the few remaining pre-motorway toll bridges in the UK and the only one in Greater Manchester. The Department for Transport describes Partington as "geographically isolated, with road access restricted by the proximity of the Manchester Ship Canal and the nearby petrochemical works [in Carrington]" and notes that there are low levels of car ownership.

Most local bus services are operated by Stagecoach Manchester: the 253 and 255 routes connect the town with Manchester Piccadilly bus station, whilst the 247 operates between Altrincham Interchange and the Trafford Centre bus station. Warrington's Own Buses provides service 5 between Altrincham and Warrington.

Partington railway station was sited to the north of the town; it was a stop on the Cheshire Lines Committee's Glazebrook to Stockport Tiviot Dale line. The station was opened in 1873, eight years after the line opened, and was in use until 30 November 1964.

In 2009, a grant of £312,000 was made by the government to set up Partington Co-operative Transport (PACT), with the purpose of improving public transport in the town.

== Media ==
Local news and television programmes are provided by BBC North West and ITV Granada. Television signals are received from the Winter Hill TV transmitter.

Local radio stations are BBC Radio Manchester, Heart North West, Smooth North West, Capital Manchester, Greatest Hits Radio Manchester & The North West and Wythenshawe FM, a community based station.

The town is served by the local newspaper, Manchester Evening News.

== Amenities ==
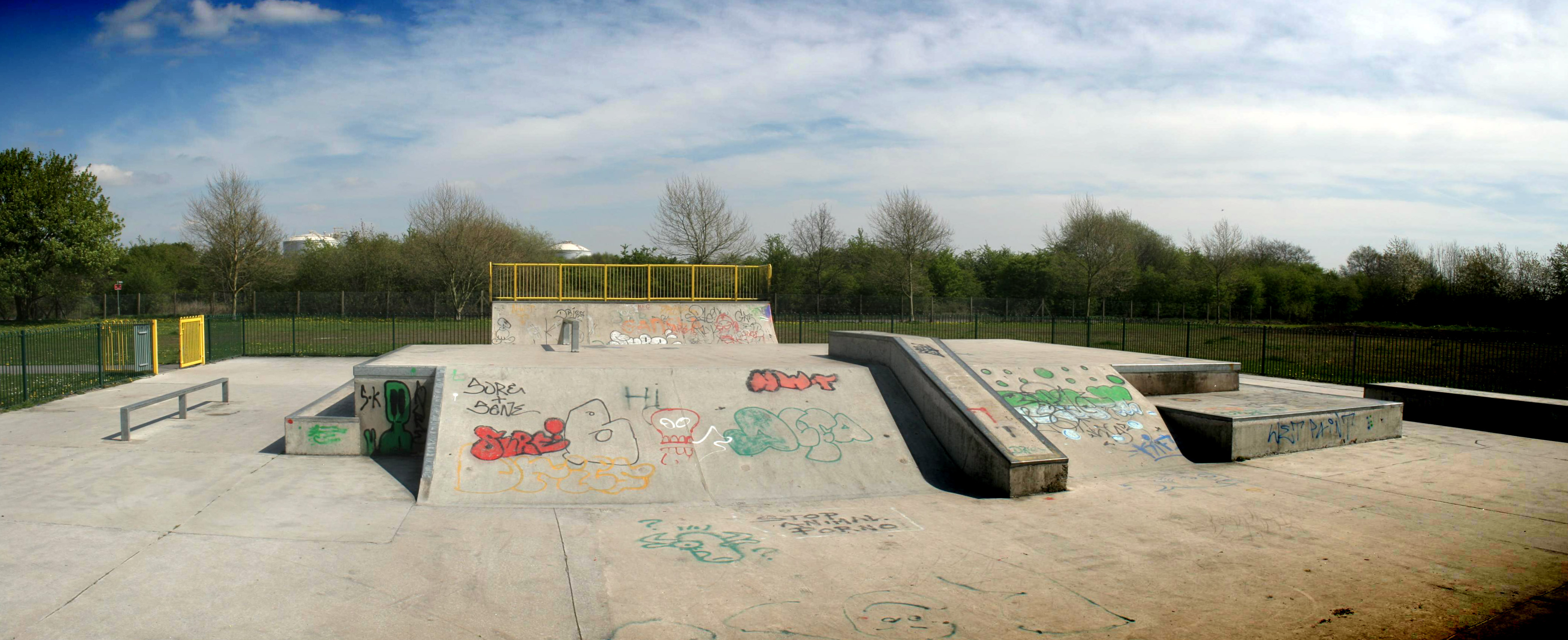
Partington skate park

Founded in 2003 as part of a government project for 11- to 19-year-olds, Partington and Carrington Youth Partnership (PCYP) has since expanded its scope and provides facilities for youths up to the age of 25. It runs a 5-a-side football league and Screamin' Wheels Skate Park.

In 2009, it was announced that a £5 million youth centre would be built in the town. Based on designs by pupils from Broadoak Secondary School, the centre will provide facilities for workshops in dance, film-making, and art. Headmaster of the school, Andy Griffin, said "It's a massive thing for Partington as this will help kick-start regeneration of the town. I think it will also help bring people to Partington rather than leaving".

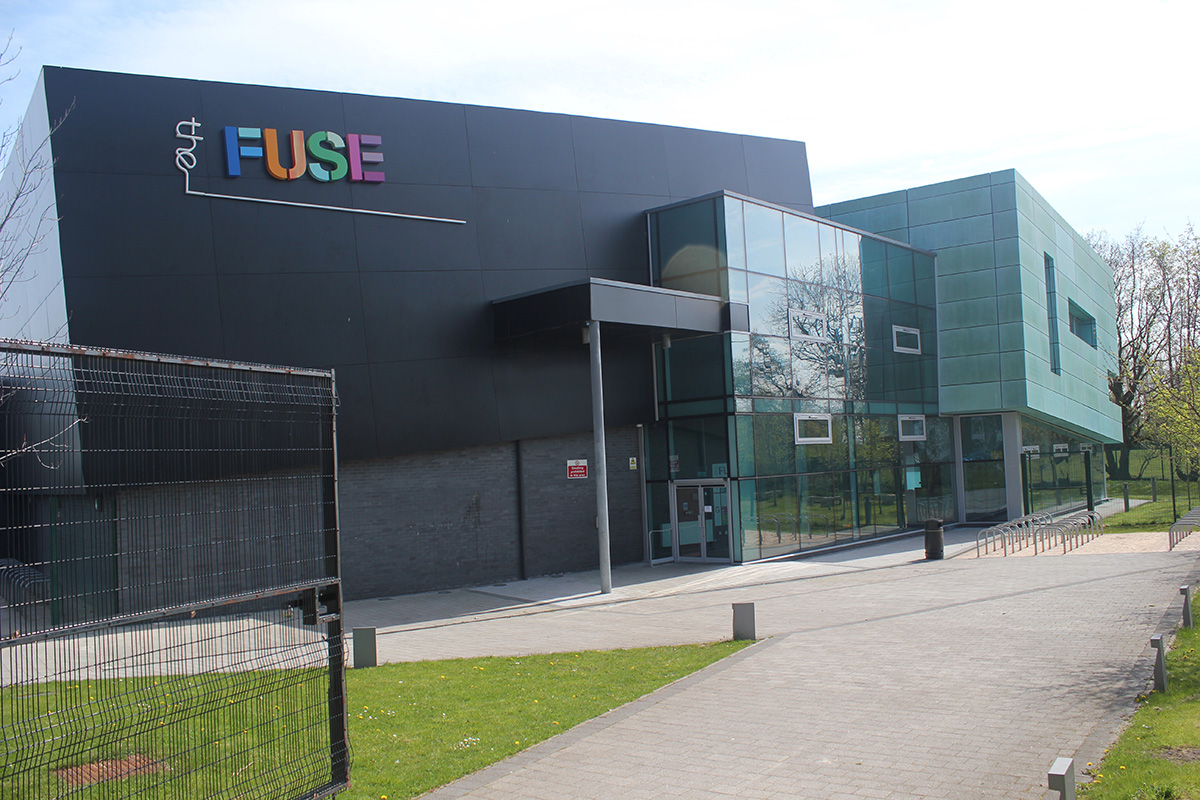
The Fuse Venue

Providing opportunities for sport, a £2 million sports complex was opened next to Broadoak Secondary School in 2008. It features a pool, a sports hall, outdoor pitches and grass courts, and facilities for other activities. The town is served by an Anglican church, St Mary's, a Roman Catholic church dedicated to Our Lady of Lourdes, a Methodist chapel, and a Baptist church called the People's Church.

St Mary's Church is a Grade II listed building, and Our Lady of Lourdes' RC Church and parish was founded in 1957. Partington is in the Catholic Dioceses of Roman Catholic Diocese of Shrewsbury and the Anglican Diocese of Chester.

== See also ==
- Listed buildings in Partington
