= Rixton Clay Pits =

Nature reserve and former clay pit

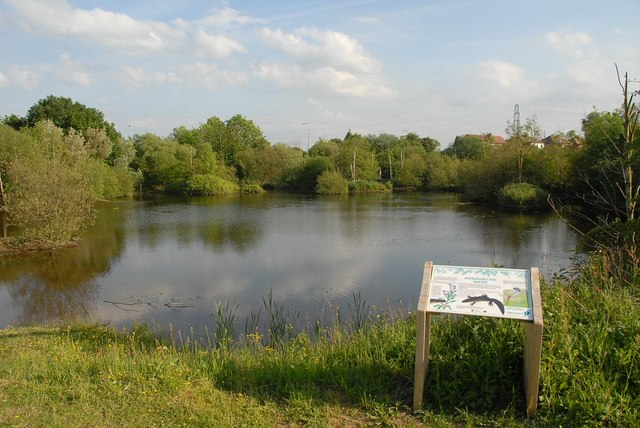
- Rixton Clay Pits

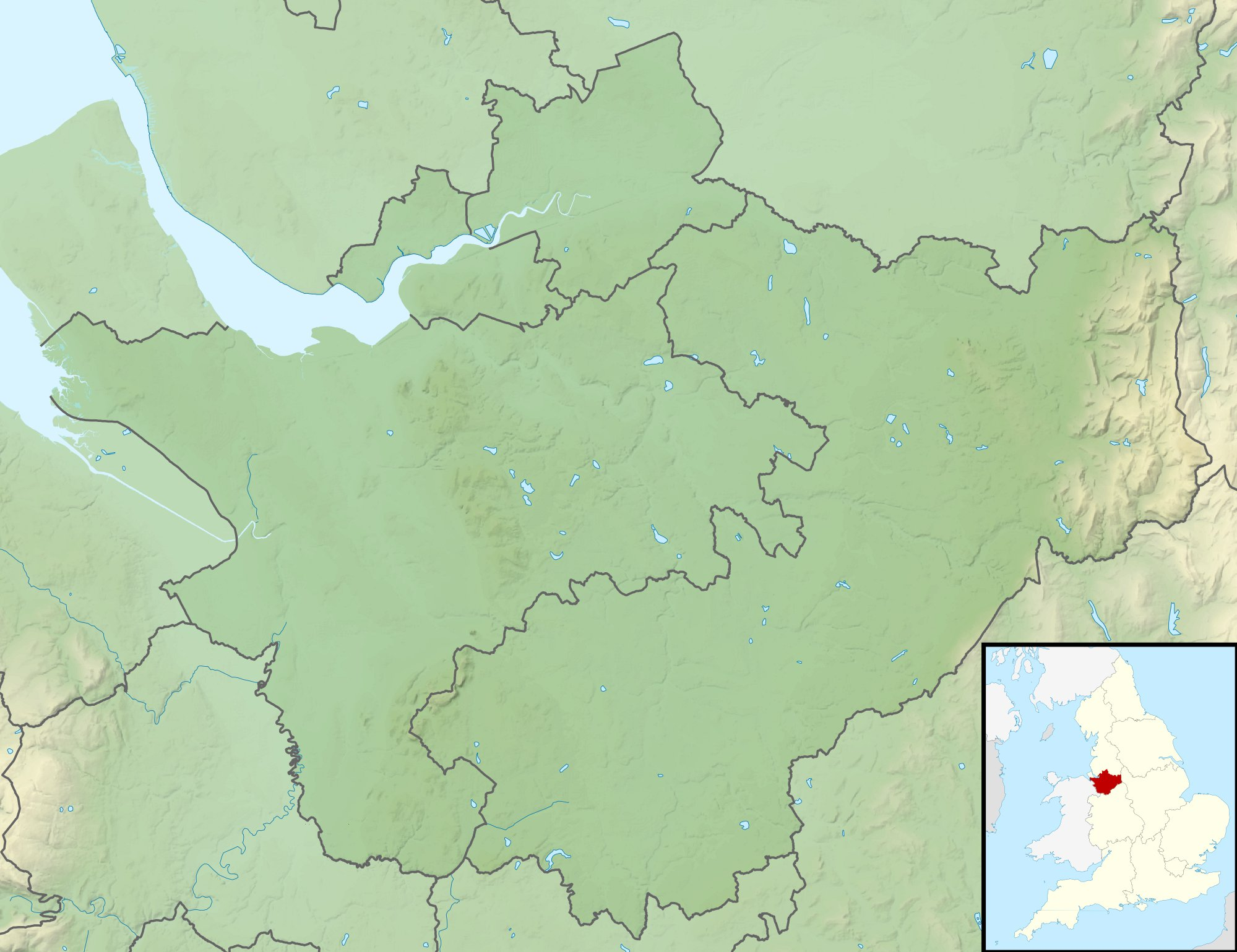
- Location within Cheshire
- Type: Local Nature Reserve, SSSI, SAC
- Location: Hollins Green, Warrington
- OS grid: SJ686906
- Coordinates: 53.409°N 2.475°W
- Area: 32.4 hectares (80 acres)
- Elevation: 15m
- Operator: Warrington Borough Council
- Open: always

Rixton Clay Pits (also known as Rixton Claypits) is a former clay extraction site in Rixton, near Hollins Green, Warrington, England. Formerly farmland, boulder clay extraction started in the 1920s for brick making in the adjacent brickworks and ceased in 1965 – since then it has been allowed to return to nature. It is now an area of ponds, scrub, woodland and damp grassland. It is owned and managed by Warrington Borough Council as a local amenity.

Two large sections of Rixton Clay Pits, 15 hectares (37 acres) in total, are a Site of Special Scientific Interest (SSSI) and a designated Special Area of Conservation, on account of its calcareous grassland communities and because it supports the largest breeding population of Great Crested Newts in Cheshire. The whole was established as a local nature reserve in 1996, and has waymarked paths and a visitor centre.

Fishing is permitted on the lake between the two sections of SSSI, and is controlled by the Warrington Anglers Association, the main stock being tench, bream and roach. Carp and pike are also present.
