= Michael Wheeler (politician) =

British politician

Michael Wheeler MP
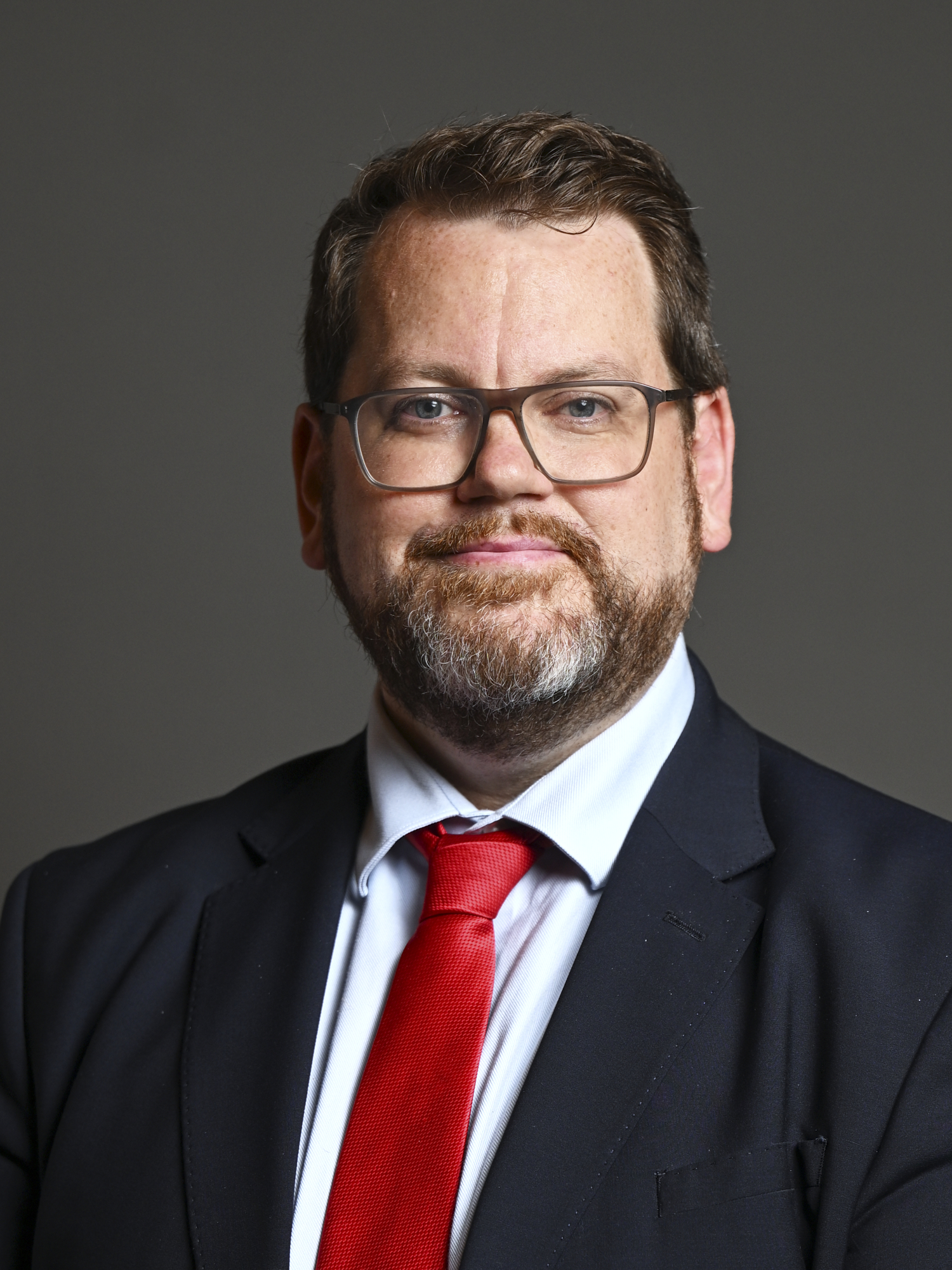
- Official portrait, 2024

Member of Parliament for Worsley and Eccles
- Incumbent
- Assumed office 4 July 2024
- Preceded by: Barbara Keeley
- Majority: 11,091 (26.1%)

Member of Salford City Council for Eccles
- In office 20 October 2011 – 6 May 2021
- Preceded by: John Cullen
- Succeeded by: Nathaniel Tetteh

Personal details
- Born: Michael Joseph Wheeler
- Party: Labour
- Education: University of Lancaster
- Occupation: Politician; trade unionist

Michael Joseph Wheeler is a British Labour Party politician who has served as Member of Parliament (MP) for Worsley and Eccles since 2024.

== Early life and education ==
He has worked as a Political Officer for the USDAW trade union and studied at Lancaster University.

== Political career ==
Wheeler was elected to represent Eccles ward on Salford City Council in a 2011 by-election. He was re-elected in 2014 and 2018, but did not seek re-election in 2021.

In the 2024 General Election, Wheeler was elected Member of Parliament (MP) for Worsley and Eccles with 20,277 votes (47.7%) and a majority of 11,091.

On 3 March 2025, Wheeler replaced Mark Ferguson on the Commons Select Committee of Privileges.

Wheeler was appointed an assistant whip on 22 July 2026.
