= Worsley and Eccles =

UK Parliament constituency (since 2024)

- Borough constituency for the House of Commons
- Interactive map of boundaries since 2024
- Location within North West England
- County: Greater Manchester
- Electorate: 76,915 (March 2020)
- Major settlements: Worsley, Boothstown, Eccles, Irlam, Cadishead, Astley

Current constituency
- Created: 2024
- Member of Parliament: Michael Wheeler (Labour)
- Seats: One
- Created from: Salford and Eccles & Worsley and Eccles South

Worsley and Eccles is a constituency of the House of Commons in the UK Parliament. Following completion of the 2023 review of Westminster constituencies, it was first contested at the 2024 general election. Since 2024, it has been represented by Michael Wheeler of the Labour Party.

== Constituency profile ==
The constituency covers the western half of the City of Salford, mostly safe Labour territory, but the seat also contains two of the Conservatives' strongest wards in the relatively affluent areas of Worsley and Boothstown & Ellenbrook; these wards, along with Eccles, were the only wards in this constituency that voted Remain in the EU referendum. Worsley itself is a desirable area with tourist attractions including historic Tudor-style manor houses along the Bridgewater Canal and the 150-acre RHS Garden Bridgewater. Eccles contains the middle-class suburb of Monton while other areas of Eccles, Barton, Winton and Patricroft are relatively working-class. The seat also contains half of the town of Swinton, shared with the Salford constituency.

In the far south-west of the constituency along the Manchester Ship Canal are the villages of Irlam and Cadishead, separated from the other settlements by swathes of green belt land and farms in the form of Chat Moss, a protected peatland area. Further to the west is the Wigan ward of Astley, a residential suburb of Leigh which was previously in the Leigh constituency though its joining with a Salford constituency is not unprecedented, having been included in a historic Worsley constituency from 1983-2010.

== Boundaries ==
Further to the 2023 boundary review, the constituency is composed of the following wards from the 2024 general election (as they existed on 1 December 2020):

- The City of Salford wards of: Barton & Winton; Boothstown & Ellenbrook; Cadishead & Lower Irlam; Eccles; Higher Irlam & Peel Green; Swinton & Wardley; Worsley & Westwood Park.
- The Metropolitan Borough of Wigan ward of Astley Mosley Common^{1}.

The seat covers the majority of, and replaces, the Worsley and Eccles South constituency - excluding the town of Walkden, which is now part of the new seat of Bolton South and Walkden. The remaining parts of Eccles, together with the town of Swinton, were transferred from Salford and Eccles (renamed Salford). The Wigan Borough ward of Astley Mosley Common was transferred from Leigh (renamed Leigh and Atherton).

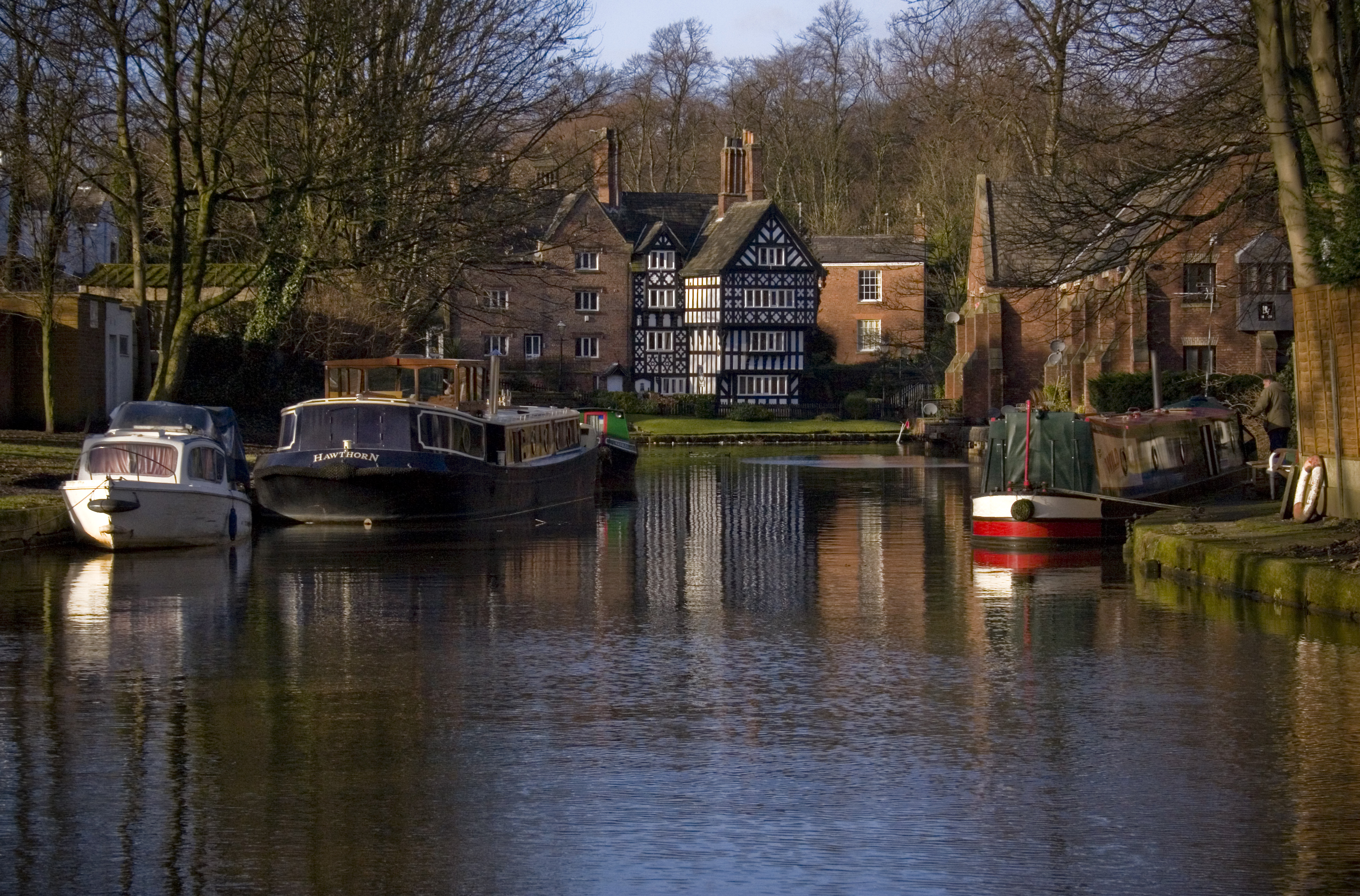
Worsley, one of the constituency's more affluent areas.

^{1} Following a local government boundary review which came into effect in May 2023, from the 2024 general election, the parts in the Metropolitan Borough of Wigan now comprise most of the Astley ward and a small part of the Tyldesley & Mosley Common ward.

== Members of Parliament ==
Election	Member	Party
2024	Michael Wheeler	Labour

== Elections ==
=== Elections in the 2020s ===
General election 2024: Worsley and Eccles
Party	Candidate	Votes	%	±%
Labour	Michael Wheeler	20,277	47.7	+1.2
Reform	Craig Birtwistle	9,186	21.6	+14.5
Conservative	Bradley Mitchell	6,791	16.0	−22.5
Green	David Jones	3,283	7.7	+5.2
Liberal Democrats	Jemma (Vella) De Vincenzo	1,851	4.4	−0.9
Workers Party	Nas Barghouti	466	1.1	N/A
Independent	Danny Moloney	448	1.1	N/A
TUSC	Sally Griffiths	241	0.6	N/A
Majority		11,091	26.1	+14.1
Turnout		42,543	54.1	−10.3
Registered electors		78,643		
Labour hold		Swing	−6.7	

=== Elections in the 2010s ===
2019 notional result
Party	Vote	%
Labour	23,058	46.5
Conservative	19,097	38.5
Brexit Party	3,541	7.1
Liberal Democrats	2,607	5.3
Green	1,260	2.5
Turnout	49,563	64.4
Electorate	76,915	
