= Rixton-with-Glazebrook =

Civil parish in Cheshire, England

Coordinates: 53.429°N 2.457°W

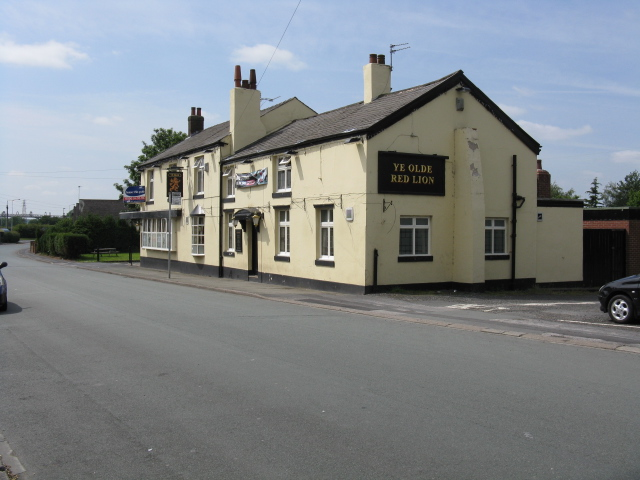
- Ye Olde Red Lion, Hollins Green

- Location within Cheshire
- Population: 1,960 (2011 Census)
- OS grid reference: SJ697925
- Civil parish: Rixton-with-Glazebrook
- Unitary authority: Warrington
- Ceremonial county: Cheshire
- Region: North West
- Country: England
- Sovereign state: United Kingdom
- Post town: WARRINGTON
- Postcode district: WA3
- Dialling code: 01925
- Police: Cheshire
- Fire: Cheshire
- Ambulance: North West
- UK Parliament: Warrington South
- Website: Warrington Villages

Rixton-with-Glazebrook is a civil parish in the Borough of Warrington, Cheshire, England. Formerly within the historic county of Lancashire, it lies to the east of Warrington and is largely farmland. At the 2011 Census, the parish had a population of 1,960. Its main settlements are the villages of Glazebrook and Hollins Green, and Rixton hamlet.

The parish was originally a township within Warrington parish before becoming a separate parish in 1866. It was part of the Warrington Poor Law Union and, from 1894, Warrington Rural District, and the District of Warrington from 1974.

Glazebrook has a small housing estate, a post office and Glazebrook railway station. The station, on the Liverpool to Manchester southern route, marks the westernmost boundary of the Transport for Greater Manchester area. Glazebrook is about 6 miles (10 km) north-east of Warrington town centre; just east of the village is Cadishead, in Greater Manchester.

Hollins Green, south of Glazebrook, is on the A57 Warrington–Manchester road. Rixton lies a short distance south-west of Hollins Green.

The Manchester Ship Canal follows a stretch of the River Mersey which runs close to Hollins Green and forms the south-eastern parish boundary. The boundary in the north-east follows the Glaze Brook, which joins the Mersey just upstream of Hollins Green.

== Toponymy ==
The name "Rixton" derives from the personal name "Ric" and tun, which is Old English for a homestead or settlement. "Glazebrook" derives from Brittonic glas, which can mean either a river, or else "blue" or "green or blue", and brook, from Old English "brōc", meaning a small stream.

== Notable people ==
- Neil McArthur (born 1956/57), businessman

== See also ==
- Listed buildings in Rixton-with-Glazebrook
