= Cadishead =

Village in Greater Manchester, England

Coordinates: 53.427°N 2.434°W

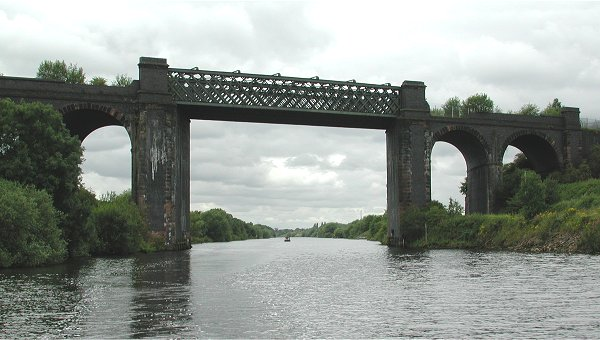
- Cadishead Viaduct previously carrying a rail-line over the Manchester Ship Canal

- Location within Greater Manchester
- Population: 10,264 (2011.Ward)
- OS grid reference: SJ711924
- Metropolitan borough: City of Salford
- Metropolitan county: Greater Manchester
- Region: North West
- Country: England
- Sovereign state: United Kingdom
- Post town: MANCHESTER
- Postcode district: M44
- Dialling code: 0161
- Police: Greater Manchester
- Fire: Greater Manchester
- Ambulance: North West
- UK Parliament: Worsley and Eccles
- Councillors: Hannah Robinson-Smith (Labour); Vacant (election 7th May); Vacant (election 7th May)

Cadishead is a village in the City of Salford in Greater Manchester, England, with a 2014 population of 10,739, situated within the historic county of Lancashire.

== History ==
The earliest record of Cadishead date to 1212, and show that the whole of Cadishead – then called Cadewalesate – was rented from King John by Gilbert Notton for four shillings a year, a sum equivalent to £349 in 2025. The name derives from the Old English words wælla and set, and Cada, a personal name; it means the "dwelling or fold by the stream of a man called Cada".

Until the early 19th century most of the area was part of the peat bog known as Chat Moss, but by 1805 work had started to reclaim the land. The opening of the Manchester Ship Canal in 1894 had a major effect on the subsequent development of Cadishead.

== Governance ==
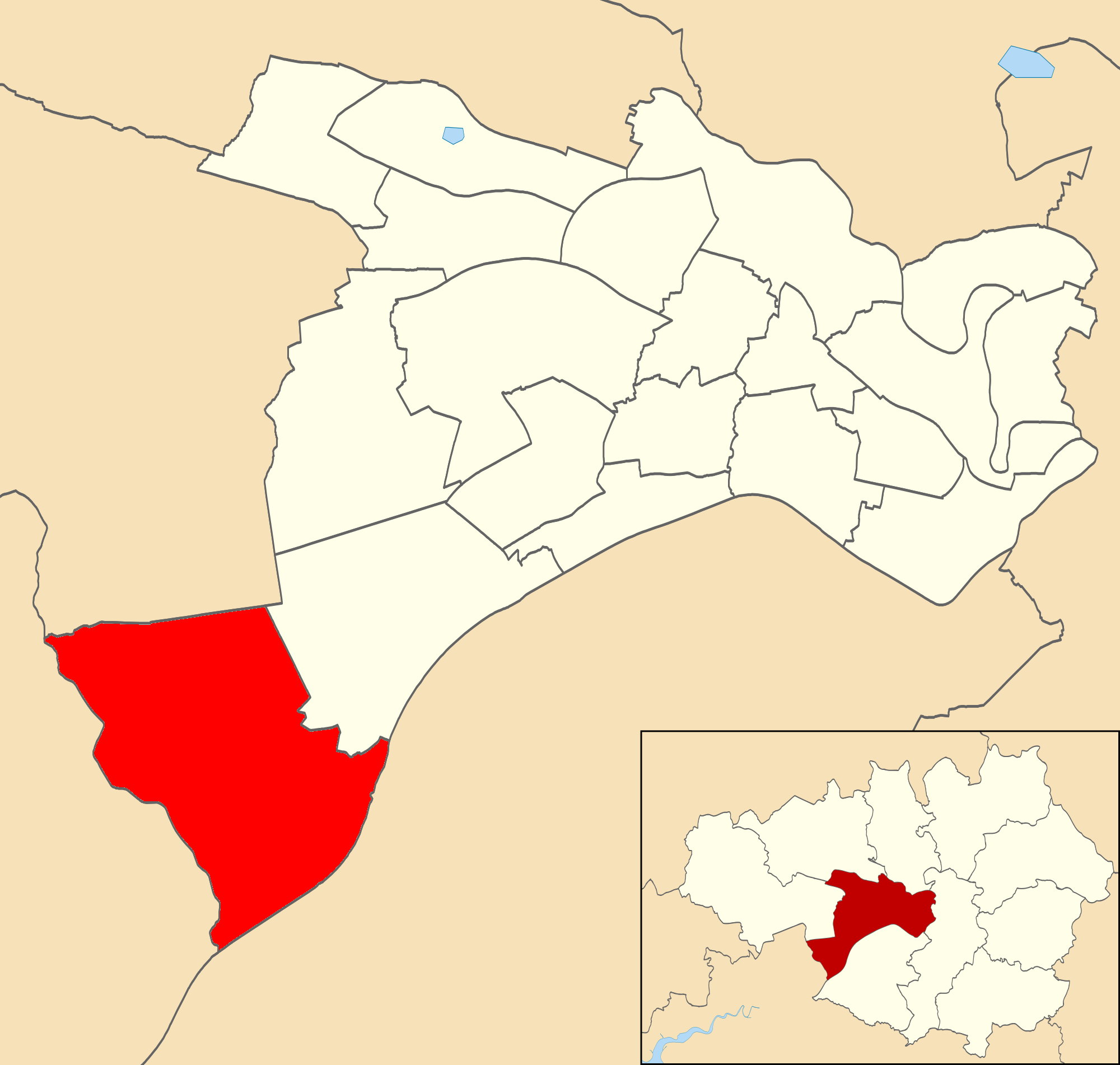
Cadishead electoral ward within Salford City Council

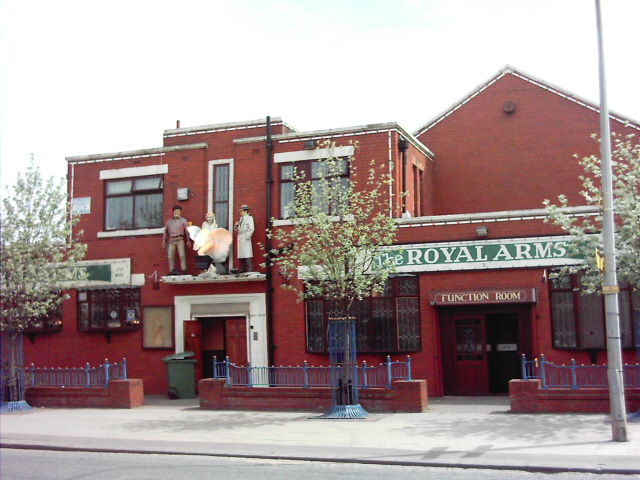
Royal Arms pub, previously known as the Royal British Legion Club

Cadishead was represented in Westminster by Barbara Keeley, MP for Worsley and Eccles South, until 2024 which marked both her retirement as an MP, and a new constituency of Worsley and Eccles, represented by Labour's Michael Wheeler.

=== Councillors ===
Until 2021 the area was represented on Salford City Council by three councillors serving the ward of Cadishead.

| Election | Councillor | Councillor | Councillor |
|---|---|---|---|
| 2004 | Keith Mann (Lab) | Christine Hudson (Lab) | Jimmy Hunt (Lab) |
| 2006 | Keith Mann (Lab) | Christine Hudson (Lab) | Jimmy Hunt (Lab) |
| 2007 | Keith Mann (Lab) | Elizabeth Hill (Con) | Jimmy Hunt (Lab) |
| 2008 | Keith Mann (Lab) | Elizabeth Hill (Con) | Lyn Bramer-Kelly (Con) |
| 2010 | Christine Hudson (Lab) | Elizabeth Hill (Con) | Lyn Bramer-Kelly (Con) |
| 2011 | Christine Hudson (Lab) | Jimmy Hunt (Lab) | Lyn Bramer-Kelly (Con) |
| 2012 | Christine Hudson (Lab) | Jimmy Hunt (Lab) | John Walsh (Lab) |
| 2014 | Christine Hudson (Lab) | Jimmy Hunt (Lab) | John Walsh (Lab) |
| 2015 | Christine Hudson (Lab) | Jimmy Hunt (Lab) | John Walsh (Lab) |
| 2016 | Christine Hudson (Lab) | Jimmy Hunt (Lab) | John Walsh (Lab) |
| 2018 | Joan Walsh (Lab) | Jimmy Hunt (Lab) | John Walsh (Lab) |
| 2019 | Joan Walsh (Lab) | Lewis Nelson (Lab) | John Walsh (Lab) |
| 2021 | Ward abolished | | |

indicates seat up for re-election.

Boundary changes coming in to effect at the 2021 Salford City Council election abolished the Cadishead ward and the Cadishead and Lower Irlam ward was created in its place.

== Location ==
Cadishead is between Irlam and Rixton, on Liverpool Road (B5320) next to the Manchester Ship Canal and the M62 motorway, close to the boundary areas between Greater Manchester and Warrington. It us around 9 miles (14 km) southwest of Manchester city centre.

== Industry ==
The Northbank Industrial Park dominates the east of Cadishead and the boundary with Irlam and supplies many jobs to the local area.

== Notable people ==
Ray Lowry was a painter and cartoonist originally from Cadishead. He created the London Calling album cover for the Clash.

== Transport ==
Cadishead was once served by its own railway station. The station closed in November 1964 as part of the Beeching cuts which affected many railway stations in the UK at the time.
