= Neil McArthur (businessman) =

British businessman

- Born: 1956 or 1957 (age 69–70); Irlam, Lancashire, England
- Education: University of Essex
- Occupation: Businessman
- Known for: Founder of Opal Telecom
- Title: Head of group innovation, TalkTalk Group
- Spouse: Anne McArthur

Neil McArthur (born 1956/1957) is a British businessman, the founder of Opal Telecom, former MD of TalkTalk Technology, and now head of group innovation for TalkTalk.

== Early life ==
McArthur was born and grew up in Carr Road, Irlam, the son of a steel worker at the former Irlam Steel Works, and a librarian.

McArthur earned a degree in engineering from the University of Essex. He is a fellow of the Institutes of Engineering and Technology and a fellow of the Institute of Mechanical Engineers.

== Career ==
McArthur began his career as an engineering apprentice at British Nuclear Fuels in 1972, later earning a BSc in Computer and Telecommunication Engineering from the University of Essex. In 1981, McArthur co-founded Thurnall PLC, an engineering business focused on control systems for various industries. As the nuclear industry declined in the mid-1990s, he pivoted the company's focus.

McArthur's most significant impact came in the telecom sector. He founded Opal Telecom in the 1980s and was its CEO. In 2002, he led Opal's merger with Carphone Warehouse to create TalkTalk, where he ran the technology division for eight years.

In 2018, McArthur became CEO of FibreNation, a fiber-to-the-premises (FTTP) startup backed by TalkTalk. Under his leadership, FibreNation was acquired by CityFibre in March 2020 for £200 million.

== Honours and appointments ==
In 1992, he was awarded an MBE for his services to engineering. He received an honorary doctorate from the University of Essex.

McArthur is a member of the advisory board of the University of Essex Business School, chairman and a trustee of the Hamilton Davies Trust charity and chairman of the Manchester Tech Trust. He is also a member of the University of Manchester's board of governors. In 2024, he was made a Fellow of the Royal Academy of Engineering.
