= Irlam =

Suburb in Greater Manchester, England

Coordinates: 53.445°N 2.422°W

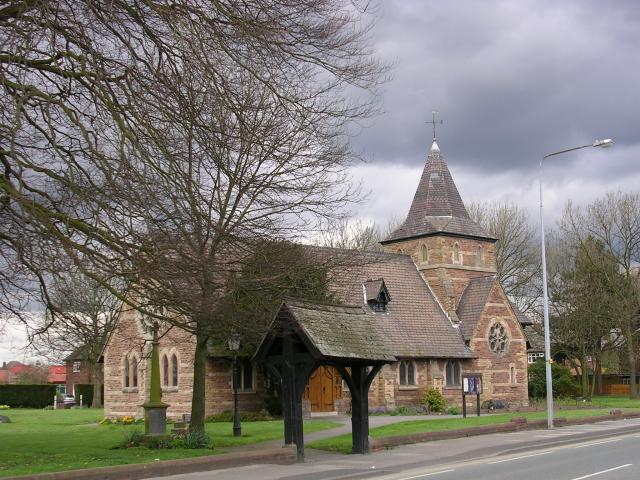
- St. John's Church

- Location within Greater Manchester
- Population: 19,933 (2011)
- OS grid reference: SJ725945
  - London: 166 mi (267 km) SE
- Metropolitan borough: Salford
- Metropolitan county: Greater Manchester
- Region: North West
- Country: England
- Sovereign state: United Kingdom
- Post town: MANCHESTER
- Postcode district: M44
- Dialling code: 0161
- Police: Greater Manchester
- Fire: Greater Manchester
- Ambulance: North West
- UK Parliament: Worsley and Eccles

Irlam is a suburb in the City of Salford, Manchester, England. In 2011, it had a population of 19,933. It lies on flat ground on the south side of the M62 motorway and the north bank of the Manchester Ship Canal, 6.7 miles (10.8 km) southwest of Salford, 7.6 miles (12.2 km) southwest of Manchester and 8.3 miles (13.4 km) northeast of Warrington. Irlam forms a continuous urban area with Cadishead to the southwest, and is divided from Flixton and the Metropolitan Borough of Trafford to the southeast by the Manchester Ship Canal. The main road through Irlam, linking it to Cadishead and Eccles, is the A57. Irlam railway station also serves the district.

Irlam was anciently known as Irwellham, an outlying area of Chat Moss, a large peat bog which straddled the River Irwell. Work was carried out in the 19th century to reclaim large areas to enable the completion of the Liverpool and Manchester Railway in 1829. In 1894, the Irwell was adjusted so that its waters were united with the Manchester Ship Canal, stimulating the growth of Irlam as an inland port. Irlam Urban District was established in the same year and was governed thereafter by its own district council until its abolition in 1974.

Irlam's geography is varied: the northern half is still moss land, with a large farming community; the southern half is predominantly residential.

== History ==
Irlam is on the north bank of the River Irwell, from which it almost certainly takes its name, being known in the thirteenth century as Irwellham. Until the arrival of the Cheshire Lines Committee railway and the opening of Irlam railway station in 1873, Irlam remained a largely undeveloped village, on the southern edge of the peat bog known as Chat Moss.

From at least the beginning of the thirteenth century, Irlam was held by the Irlam family, whose seat was Irlam Hall. By 1688 Irlam Hall had become the home of Thomas Latham, who played an important part in bringing William of Orange to the throne of England in 1689.

Irlam Urban District was created in 1894, the same year that the Manchester Ship Canal opened. A pair of locks and a ship coaling berth were constructed here. The subsequent industrial development of Irlam owed much to the construction of the canal, which effectively rendered the River Irwell navigable to large ocean-going ships up to Manchester Docks. The Latham family's importance to the local area was acknowledged when their features were incorporated into the arms of Irlam's former urban district council.

Council-owned housing passed to the City West Housing Trust. It was while renovating some of these properties that there was a large gas explosion at 7:00 am on 2 November 2010. Four houses were destroyed, 15 people were injured and 80 families were subsequently evacuated. There were no fatalities.

== Governance ==
The ward elect three councillors to Salford City Council via its Irlam ward. The current councillors are: Roger Jones (Labour Co-op), Peter Taylor (Labour), and Tracy Kelly (Labour). It part of the Worsley and Eccles constituency.

== Economy ==
Steel manufacture was a major source of employment in Irlam for a large part of the 20th century. The Partington Steel and Iron Company opened the first steelworks in Irlam in 1910. It subsequently became a part of the Lancashire Steel Corporation, and later British Steel Corporation. Rationalisation and the concentration of steel manufacture into fewer, larger sites, meant that by 1979, all steel production in Irlam had ceased. The former steelworks are now the site of Northbank Industrial Estate.

Kingsland Wine & Spirits, the UK's largest independent wine bottler, operates from a 35-acre (14 ha) site in Irlam, formerly a soapworks established in 1895. The company employs 300 people.

== Sport ==
Irlam F.C. is a semi-professional football club that plays in the North West Counties League and has its ground at the Ambitek Stadium on Silver Street. There are two junior football teams in the area, one of them being Irlam JFC.

Irlam Cricket Club plays in the Greater Manchester Cricket League, and Irlam Leisure Centre is a facility with a swimming pool, sports hall, squash court and fitness gym.

== Notable people ==
- Neil McArthur
- Matty Blythe
- Bob Dale
- Michelle Keegan
- Percy Le Clerc
- Emma Lowndes
- Adam Neal
- Jason Talbot
- Ernest Warburton
- Russell Watson
- Scott Hogan
- Liam Hogan

== See also ==
- Listed buildings in Irlam
- Irlam and Cadishead Academy

== Bibliography ==
- Cooper, Glynis (2005). Salford: An Illustrated History. The Breedon Books Publishing Company. ISBN 1-85983-455-8.
