= Skelton Junction =

Complex of railway junctions

Coordinates: 53°24′02″N 2°20′16″W

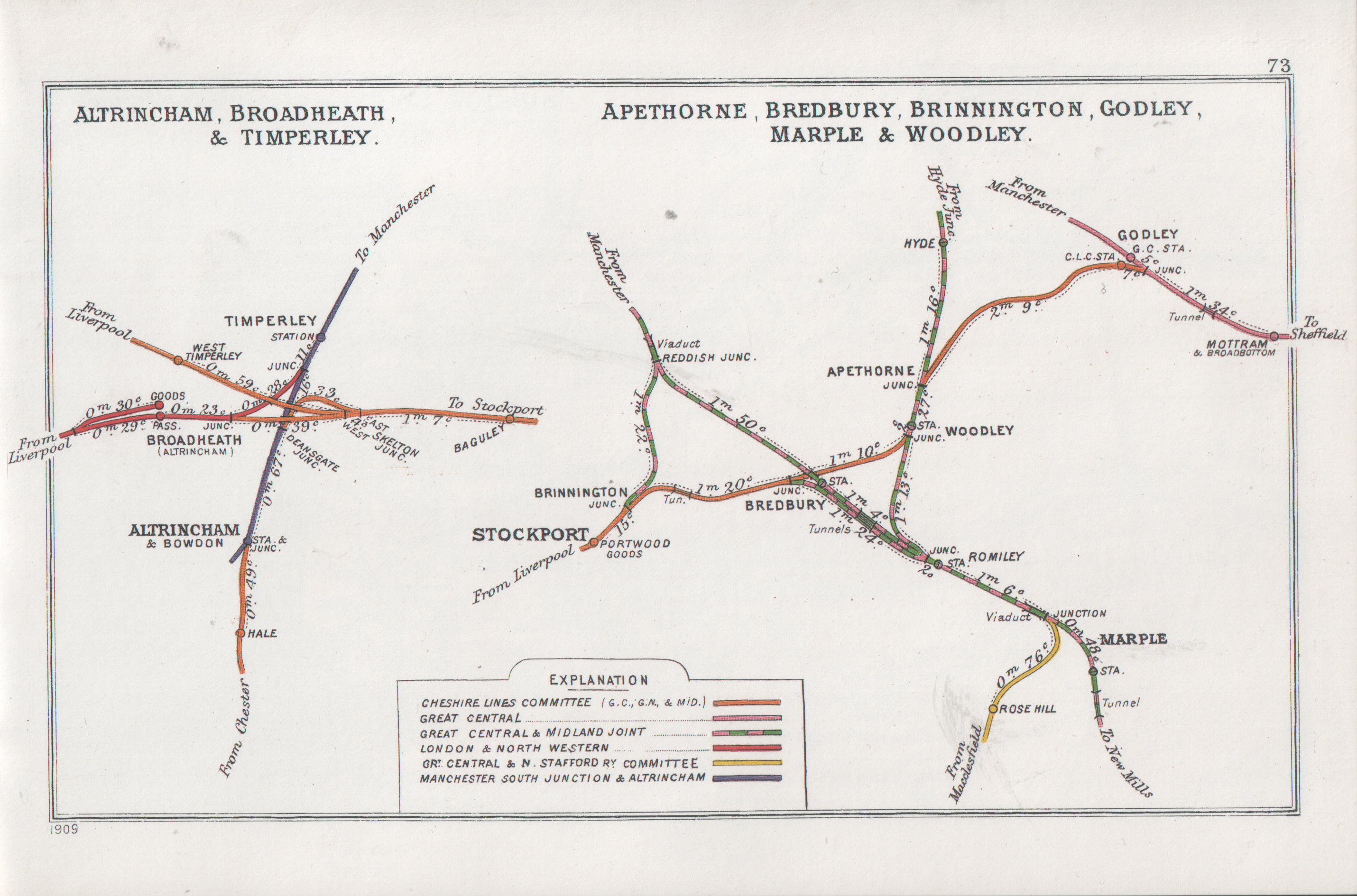
Terminal Junctions at Altrincham. Skelton East and West Junctions are shown in the lefthand section

Skelton Junction is a complex of railway junctions south of Manchester in Timperley, near Altrincham. Both the Cheshire Lines Committee's Liverpool to Manchester line, via the Glazebrook East Junction to Skelton Junction Line and the LNWR's Warrington and Altrincham Junction Railway, fed into the junction from Liverpool in the west. The Manchester, South Junction and Altrincham Railway provided a connection from the Altrincham direction and a short spur from Timperley towards Stockport, while the CLC's Stockport, Timperley and Altrincham Junction Railway continued east to Stockport.

== The lines today ==
=== Active ===
The only line currently in use is the line from Altrincham towards Stockport; this is used by the Chester to Manchester Piccadilly via Altrincham and Northwich service. Additionally, various freight workings use the line, including heavy block trains carrying limestone from quarries at Tunstead (near Buxton) to alkali works at Northwich.

=== Closed ===
The line via Broadheath and Lymm to Warrington closed on 7 July 1985 and has now been lifted. The line via West Timperley and Partington is still intact as far as Partington but has been disused since October 1993, when all regular freight traffic to the chemical works ceased. The Great Central Railway connection north from the CLC to the MSJ&A Rly towards Timperley Station closed before the Second World War. There used to be a small marshalling yard, including a turntable in the fork between the Altrincham and Partington lines. The yard was traversed by a long concrete footbridge known locally as The Black Bridge. A shorter green steel bridge, which is still known as The Black Bridge, has replaced this.
