= Glazebrook railway station =

Railway station in Cheshire, England

Glazebrook
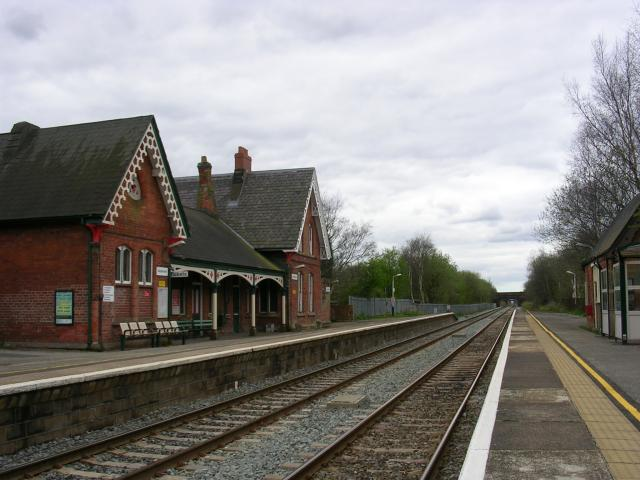

General information
- Location: Rixton-with-Glazebrook, Warrington; England
- Coordinates: 53.4282°N 2.4598°W
- Grid reference: SJ694924
- Manager: Northern Trains
- Transit authority: Greater Manchester
- Platforms: 2

Other information
- Station code: GLZ
- Classification: DfT category E

History
- Original company: Cheshire Lines Committee
- Pre-grouping: Cheshire Lines Committee
- Post-grouping: Cheshire Lines Committee

Key dates
- 2 September 1873: Station opened

Passengers
- 2021/22: ▲23,552
- 2022/23: ▲24,296
- 2023/24: ▼23,972
- 2024/25: ▲25,546
- 2025/26: ▲31,114
Location
Notes
- Passenger statistics from the Office of Rail and Road

Glazebrook railway station serves the villages in the civil parish of Rixton-with-Glazebrook in the Warrington unitary authority in the ceremonial county of Cheshire, England. The station, and all trains serving it, are operated by Northern Trains. The station is 9.9 miles (16 km) west of Manchester Oxford Road on the Manchester to Liverpool Line.

== History ==
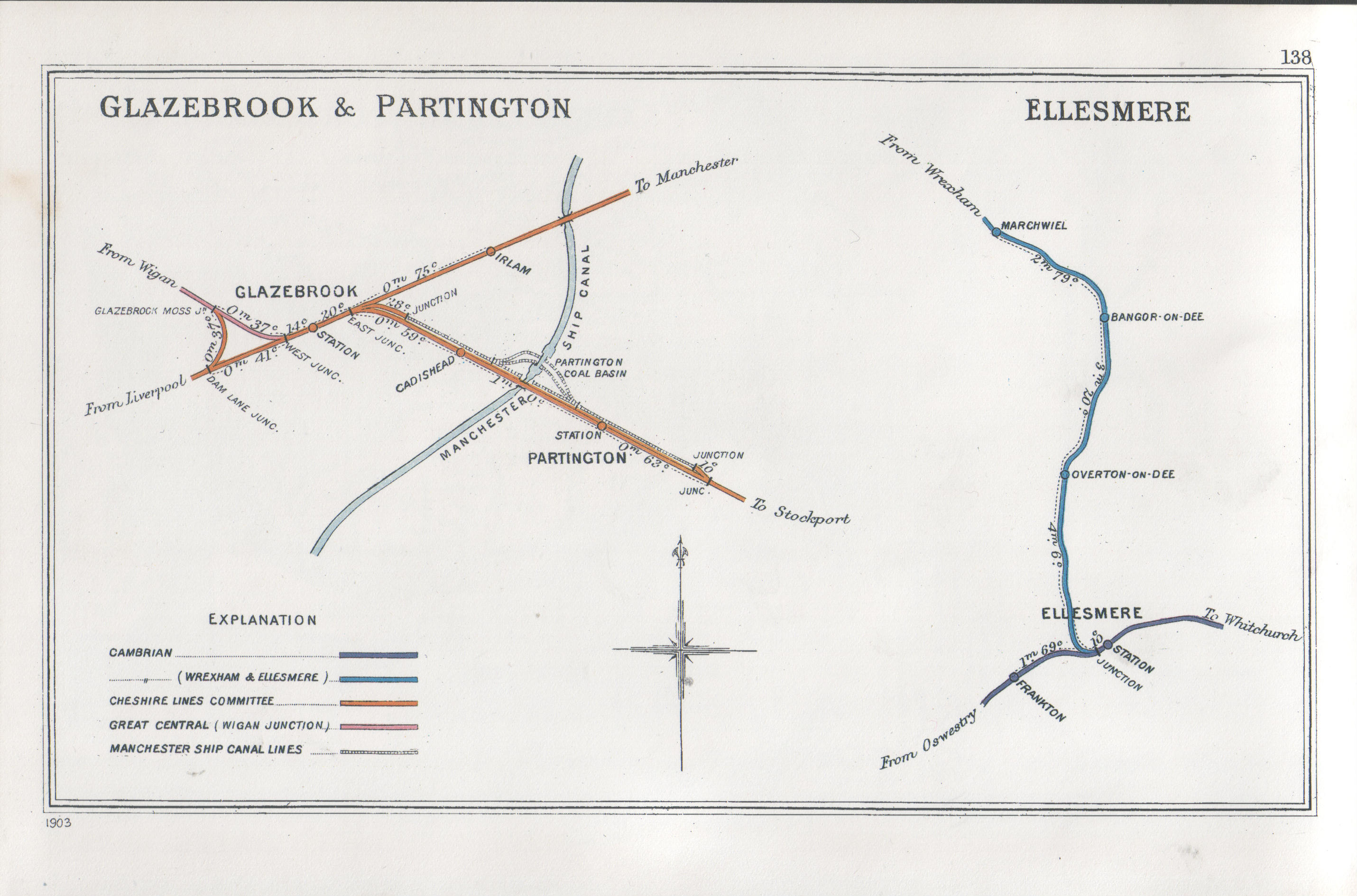
Lines around Glazebrook & Partington in 1907.

Glazebrook station was formerly located between two junctions, Glazebrook West for the Wigan Junction Railways to Wigan Central and St Helens Central (GCR), services to those stations ceasing in 1952 (St Helen's Central) and 1964 (Wigan Central); and Glazebrook East Junction for the line to Stockport Tiviot Dale via Skelton Junction, passenger services to there also ceased in 1964. East of Glazebrook there is the only passing loop east of Warrington, used regularly for late running fast trains to pass local services.

The station building, opened on 2 September 1873, is of typical Cheshire Lines Committee design. The ticket office is open weekday mornings only (07:10 -10:10). Although this station is not within the Greater Manchester area, it does mark the western boundary of the range of rail tickets produced by Transport for Greater Manchester. Level access to the platform is available on the Liverpool-bound side; the opposite side is accessed via a long ramp but neither side is listed as step-free by National Rail Enquiries.

== Services ==
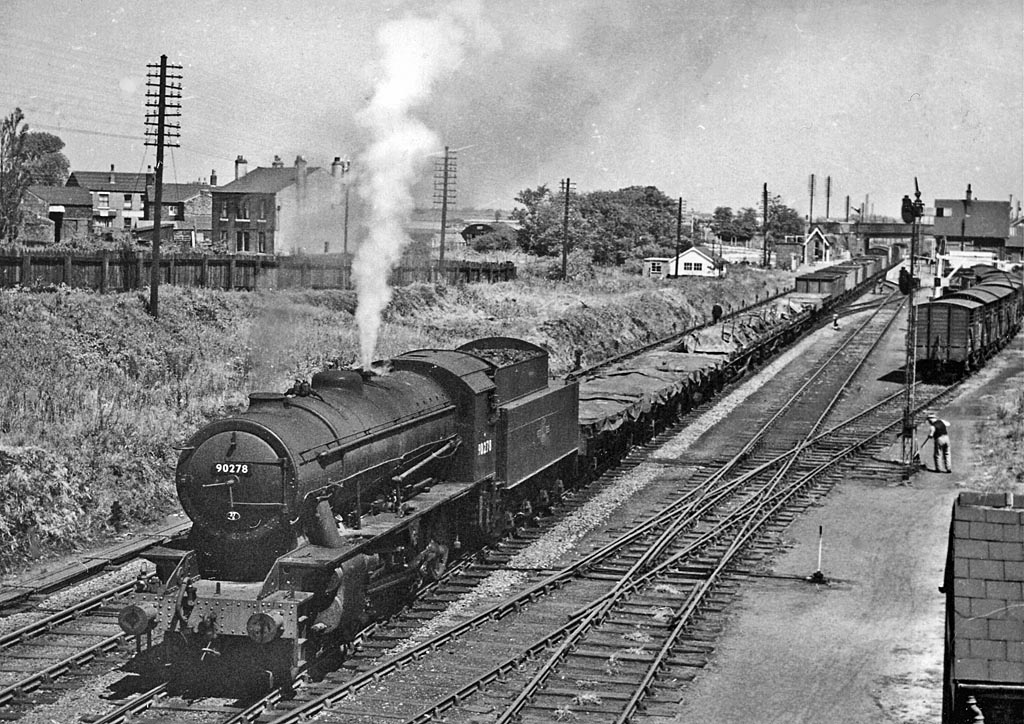
Down goods train on Cheshire Lines at Glazebrook in June 1957

Daytime services are roughly two hourly towards Birchwood and Liverpool Lime Street and two hourly towards Irlam and Manchester Oxford Road. There are additional peak services, but no Sunday services (nearest stations with Sunday services are Irlam or Birchwood).

A summary of services is:

- 12 tpd towards Manchester Oxford Road
- 13 tpd towards Liverpool Lime Street

== See also ==
- Listed buildings in Rixton-with-Glazebrook

Preceding station	National Rail	Following station
Birchwood	Northern Trains; Manchester to Liverpool Line Southern Route (Cheshire Lines)	Irlam
	Disused railways	
Padgate; Line and station open	Cheshire Lines Committee; Glazebrook East Junction to Skelton Junction Line	Cadishead; Line and station closed
Newchurch Halt; Line and station closed	Great Central Railway; Wigan Junction Railways	Irlam; Line and station open
