= Ellesmere Park High School =

Location
- Wentworth Road; Ellesmere Park, Eccles; Salford, Greater Manchester, M30 9BP; England
- 53.4928°N 2.3342°W

Information
- Type: Academy
- Founder: Heather Aaron
- Local authority: Salford
- Trust: Consilium Academies
- Department for Education URN: 144200 Tables
- Ofsted: Reports
- Headteacher: Ian Ross
- Gender: Coeducational
- Age: 11 to 16
- Website: https://www.ephs.org.uk/

Ellesmere Park High School is a coeducational secondary school located in the Ellesmere Park area of Eccles, Greater Manchester, England. The school has gone through several renovations throughout the years.

The school on Wentworth Road was originally built as a county secondary school and was officially opened in 1957 as Ellesmere County Secondary School. Later, its name was changed to Ellesmere Park Secondary Modern School as the school leaving age was extended.

== Comprehensive ==
=== Grammar school ===
The Monton Building, formerly known as Eccles Grammar School was the first secondary school built by Lancashire County Council after the 1902 Education Act. The original building was on Park Road in Monton, at the top of Hawthorn Avenue.

The grammar school's magazine was called the Essayan.

The school was renamed Ellesmere Park High School in September 2014 and moved.

== Notable alumni ==
=== Wentworth High School ===
- Linzey Cocker, actress
- Joe Duddell, composer

=== Ellesmere Park High School (1973–87) ===
- Andy Crane, TV and radio presenter, does the weekday afternoon slot on BBC Radio Manchester

=== Eccles Grammar School ===
- Sidney Clarke (priest), Chaplain-in-Chief from 1930-33 of the RAF
- Bryce Fulton, full back for Plymouth Argyle F.C.
- Stephen Gallagher, novelist, director and screenwriter of Chimera, Oktober, Eleventh Hour
- Nicholas Higham FRS, mathematician
- Debbie Horsfield, TV writer who wrote Making Out, and the adaptation for the Poldark (2015 TV series)
- Elgar Howarth, brass band conductor
- Tom Neil DFC (1920-2018), Battle of Britain pilot
- Tony Warren MBE, creator of Coronation Street

== See also ==
- Worsley Wardley Grammar School
