= Church of St Andrew, Eccles =

Listed church in Greater Manchester, England

- St Andrew's Church, Eccles
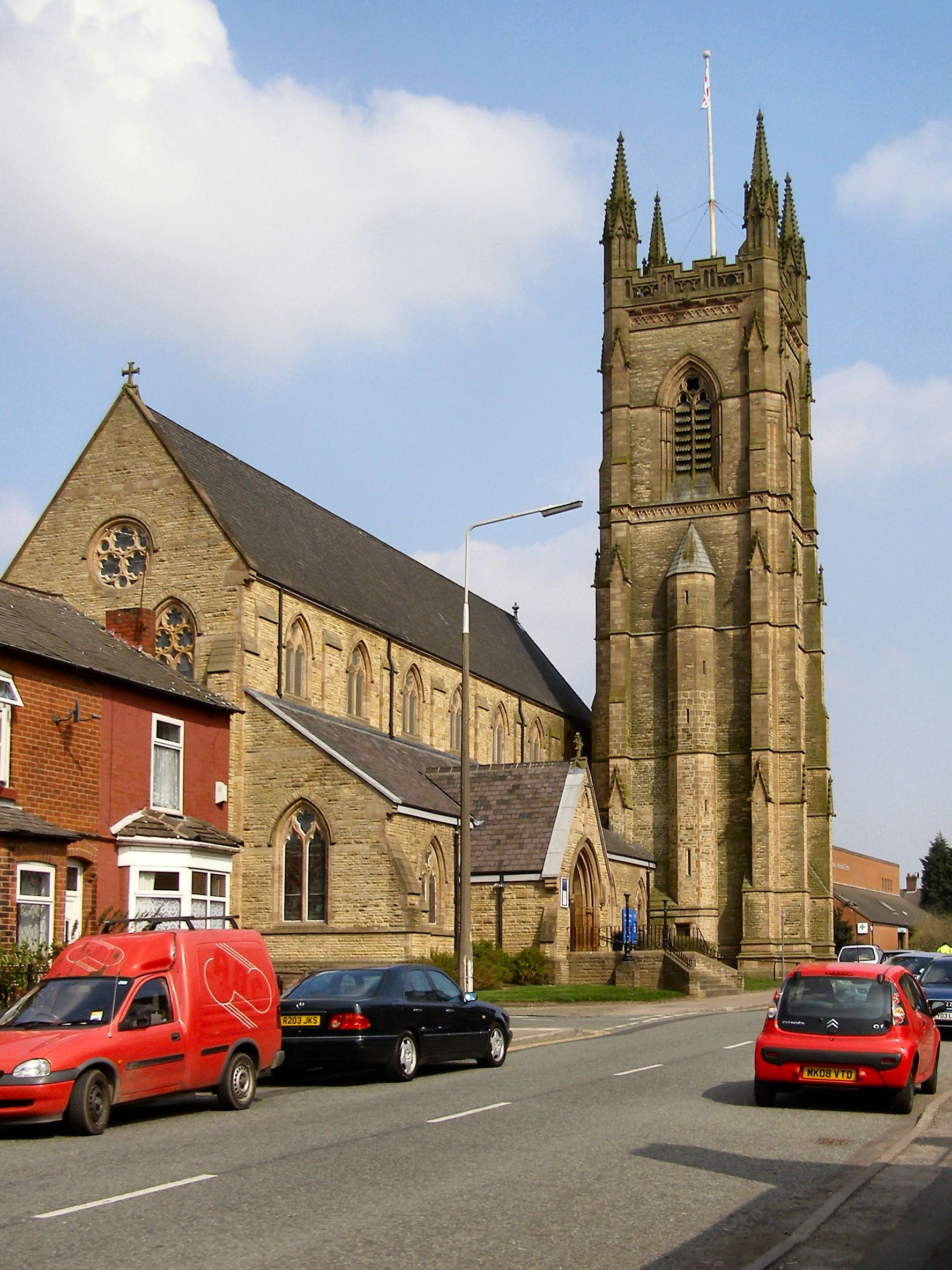
- The church in 2010

- Location in Greater Manchester
- 53.4851°N 2.3420°W
- OS grid reference: SJ 77400 98764
- Address: Chadwick Road, Eccles, Greater Manchester
- Country: England
- Denomination: Anglican
- Website: Church of St Andrew

History
- Dedication: St Andrew
- Consecrated: 2 October 1869; 156 years ago

Architecture
- Heritage designation: Grade II*
- Designated: 16 July 1987
- Architect(s): Herbert Edward Tijou; J. S. Crowther (tower)
- Architectural type: Church
- Style: Gothic Revival
- Years built: 1877–1879; 147 years ago 1889; 137 years ago (tower)

Administration
- Archdiocese: Archdeacon of Salford
- Diocese: Diocese of Manchester

Clergy
- Priest: Rev. Jez Wisdom

The Church of St Andrew is an Anglican parish church on Chadwick Road in Eccles, a town in the City of Salford, Greater Manchester, England. Built between 1877 and 1879 to the designs of Herbert Edward Tijou, it is an example of Gothic Revival architecture. The tower, added in 1889, was designed by J. S. Crowther. It is an active church in the Diocese of Manchester and stands within a predominantly late‑Victorian residential area close to the town centre. It is recorded in the National Heritage List for England as a Grade II* listed building.

== History ==
The parish of St Andrew was created in the late 19th century as part of the subdivision of the large medieval parish of St Mary the Virgin in Eccles. Rapid population growth following the Industrial Revolution led to the establishment of new churches to serve expanding districts. By the 1870s, Canon Pitcairn, rector of St Mary's, determined that a new church was required to serve the eastern side of Eccles and the developing suburb of Monton.

A building fund was established by local professionals and businessmen, with Henry Boddington, chairman of Boddingtons Brewery, acting as honorary treasurer. The architect Herbert Edward Tijou was commissioned to design the new church, which was constructed between 1877 and 1879. The foundation stone was laid by James Fraser, the bishop of Manchester, on 6 October 1877. The church was consecrated shortly after completion and became the centre of the newly formed parish of St Andrew.

A church school associated with the parish opened four months after the church's completion, forming the basis of the present St Andrew's Church of England Primary School. During the 1880s, the interior was enriched with an extensive programme of stone carving, comprising more than fifty individually carved figures and motifs. The tower, although following Tijou's design, was completed by the Manchester architect J. S. Crowther in 1889. Between the 1880s and the early 20th century, a significant body of stained glass was installed, including east windows by Charles Eamer Kempe.

On 16 July 1987, the Church of St Andrew was designated a Grade II* listed building.

== Architecture ==
The church is constructed in rock‑faced stone with a roof of slate, and comprises a nave and apse beneath a continuous roof, with aisles, a south porch, and a tower to the south‑east. It is designed in the Gothic Revival style. The nave and aisles are arranged in seven bays and stand on a weathered plinth, with weathered buttresses. The aisles and clerestory contain 2‑light windows with hood moulds and geometrical tracery. A gabled porch occupies the second bay.

The west front has two 2‑light windows together with a rose window. The apse is polygonal and contains 2‑light windows to each face. The tower is a prominent four‑stage design with set‑back buttresses that are weathered and gableted, continuing as octagonal piers that rise as crocketed pinnacles above a parapet that is pierced and castellated. It includes a 4‑light window, a lancet window in the second stage, a rose window in the third stage, and trefoil friezes positioned above and below the 2‑light openings of the belfry.

=== Interior ===
Internally, the nave is arranged with a 7‑bay arcade of moulded arches carried on circular stone columns with well‑carved capitals that are foliated. The nave roof is lofty and supported by arch‑braced trusses. The chancel contains carved and elaborate choir stalls, oak panelling, a reredos, a communion rail, and an organ loft dating from 1898 to 1902. The organ, originally built in 1883, was rebuilt and enlarged in the mid‑20th century. A low chancel wall incorporates a pulpit of 1879. The aisle pews, brought from Manchester Cathedral, were installed in 1893, while the central nave pews date from 1918. The font, dating from 1879, was relocated in 1995. The floors include Minton tiles.

The stained glass scheme includes the east windows of 1886 by Kempe, the west window of 1916, and four further windows probably by Shrigley and Hunt of Preston. Four additional windows are signed by Alfred O. Hemming. A window in the north aisle depicts and commemorates A. H. Clayton, a local man who died at the Battle of Loos in 1915.

== See also ==
- Grade II* listed buildings in Greater Manchester
- Listed buildings in Eccles, Greater Manchester
