= Queen's Arms, Patricroft =

Listed pub in Greater Manchester, England

Queen's Arms
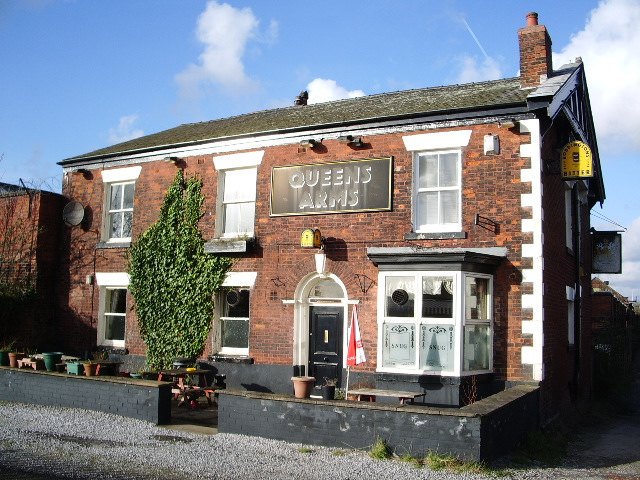
- The pub in 2010

- Location within Greater Manchester
- Alternative names: Queens Arms; Top House

General information
- Type: Public house
- Location: Green Lane, Patricroft, Eccles, Greater Manchester, England
- Coordinates: 53.4850°N 2.3585°W
- Year built: 1828; 198 years ago
- Renovated: Early 20th century (altered)

Design and construction
- Designations

Listed Building – Grade II
- Official name: Queens Arms
- Designated: 9 March 1989
- Reference no.: 1067506

Website
- queensarmseccles.uk

The Queen's Arms is a Grade II listed public house on Green Lane in Patricroft, a suburb near the market town of Eccles in the City of Salford, England. Built in 1828 as an early refreshment stop for the Liverpool and Manchester Railway, described as laying claim to being the world's first railway pub, it was renamed the Queen's Arms after Queen Victoria's 1851 visit to Salford and is rated by the Campaign for Real Ale (CAMRA) with two stars for having an interior of "very special national historic interest".

== History ==
The building was constructed in 1828, according to its official listing. It was established as a refreshment stop ahead of the opening of the Liverpool and Manchester Railway in 1830, and has been described as laying claim to being the world's first railway public house. Following Queen Victoria's visit to Salford in 1851, it was renamed the Queen's Arms; its earlier name is not recorded in available sources.

The 1893 Ordnance Survey map marks the building as a hotel, but does not attribute a name. The 1908 edition depicts it as an inn, while the 1929 edition records it as a public house.

The building underwent alterations in the early 20th century, but the listing does not specify what they involved. On 9 March 1989, the Queen's Arms was designated a Grade II listed building. The pub is regarded by the Campaign for Real Ale (CAMRA) as having an interior of "very special national historic importance" and is rated two stars in its grading scheme. It is locally referred to as the Top House; the period from which this name dates is uncertain.

== Architecture ==
=== Exterior ===
The building is constructed in brick with a Welsh slate roof and has an L‑shaped layout, with three bars—two in the front range and one in the rear wing. It has two storeys and three windows across the front, with horned sash windows throughout except for the canted bay to the right of the entrance, which contains an Edwardian etched‑glass window. The doorway has a round‑headed opening. The right‑hand gable has prominent bargeboards and irregularly placed sash windows.

=== Interior ===
The interior keeps a layout with distinct bar areas. From the entrance lobby, a doorway on the left leads to the vault, which has a panelled counter and a screened servery at the lobby end. A passage beyond the lobby leads to the smoke room on the right, where fixed bench seating has small screens at each end beside the doorway. The room also contains a fireplace with an Art Nouveau‑style surround and a large overmantel mirror.

Further along, a cross passage leads to the central lounge, which has fixed bench seating and a canted bay window, and to the right, the billiard room, where an opening above the seating allows views from the lounge bar. Several half‑glazed panelled doors with etched glass remain in the bar entrances.

== See also ==
- Listed buildings in Eccles, Greater Manchester
- Listed pubs in Greater Manchester
