= Stanley Arms, Eccles =

Listed pub in Greater Manchester, England

Stanley Arms
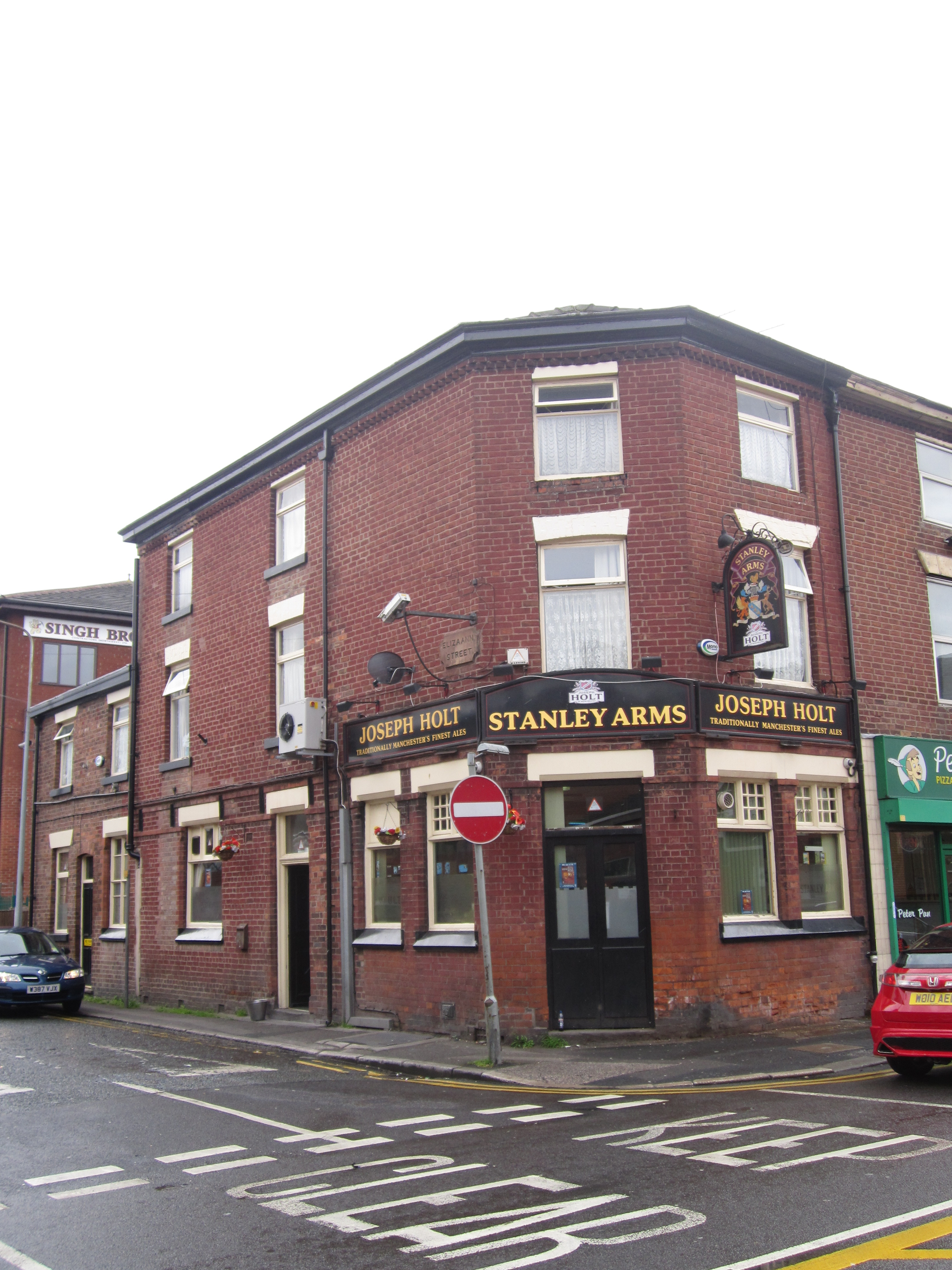
- The pub in 2013

- Location within Greater Manchester

General information
- Type: Public house
- Location: 295 Liverpool Road, Patricroft, Eccles, Greater Manchester, England
- Coordinates: 53.4816°N 2.3571°W
- Year built: Late 19th century
- Renovated: c. 1910 (remodelled)
- Owner: Joseph Holt's

Design and construction
- Designations

Listed Building – Grade II
- Official name: Stanley Arms, Eccles
- Designated: 13 February 2004
- Reference no.: 1415745

Website
- Official website

The Stanley Arms is a Grade II listed public house on Liverpool Road in Patricroft, a suburb near the market town of Eccles in the City of Salford, England. Built in the late 19th century, it has belonged to Joseph Holt's since 1910, when alterations are believed to have included the incorporation of a neighbouring terraced house. The pub is included on CAMRA's National Inventory of Historic Pub Interiors, where its three-star interior is recognised as being of "outstanding national historic importance". It has been described as one of the smallest pubs in Greater Manchester.

== History ==
The building was constructed in the late 19th century, according to its official listing. The public house was taken over by Joseph Holt's in 1910 from Wilson's Brewery, with alterations understood to have been made then. A late 19th‑century terraced house on the south‑east side was incorporated into the pub in the 20th century, perhaps at the time of its acquisition by Holt's.

It was included on the Campaign for Real Ale (CAMRA)'s National Inventory of Historic Pub Interiors before the inventory's grading system was revised. Under the revised scheme, it is rated three stars and its interior is regarded as being "of outstanding national historic importance". On 13 February 2004, the Stanley Arms was designated a Grade II listed building. As of June 2026, the pub's freehold was owned by Holt's, and it has been described as being one of the smallest in Greater Manchester.

== Architecture ==
=== Exterior ===
The building is constructed in red brick and has three storeys with a slate roof, incorporating a two‑storey former terraced house on its south‑east side. It occupies a narrow corner plot at the junction of Liverpool Road and Eliza Ann Street, with the attached house now forming part of the internal layout.

Most of the ground‑floor windows appear to have been altered around 1910. The Liverpool Road frontage has paired ground‑floor windows with shared stone details; one retains etched glass with the name "Stanley Arms". Above are later casements, and a corner entrance, now unused, sits beneath modern signage. An eaves band continues around to the Eliza Ann Street side.

The attached former house retains its original doorway and several window openings, though the casements have been replaced. One ground‑floor window appears to have been altered during the early 20th‑century remodelling. Two further houses once stood on the south‑east side but were later demolished, and a modern doorway has been added to the gable end.

=== Interior ===
Inside, partly glazed panelled doors remain throughout, except to the smoke room, which has lost its door. The entrance from Eliza Ann Street leads into a small vestibule and then a corridor that turns in an L‑shape towards the south‑east. Both spaces have coved ceilings and a green tiled dado with Art Nouveau‑style decoration. A door on the north‑west side of the vestibule has etched glass with the word "Vault". The vault contains a large multi‑sided bar counter in the south corner, fixed seating, moulded cornicing and a chimneybreast, although the fireplace has been removed. It is separated from the corridor by a timber and glass bar servery with sliding panels.

An angled doorway opposite the servery leads into the smoke room, which has re‑upholstered fixed seating with original bell‑pushes, ceiling coving and a later fire surround with an electric fire. The corridor is lit by a tall window on the south‑west side with leaded and stained glass in an Art Nouveau style. Toilets open off each side and have tiled dados in white and green with decorative borders, along with red, black and cream tiled floors; the original urinals remain in the gents.

The ground‑floor room in the former terraced house at the south‑east end has fixed seating with later upholstery, ceiling coving and a large cast‑iron range from its earlier domestic use. A later doorway in the south‑east wall leads out to a small yard.

== See also ==
- Listed buildings in Eccles, Greater Manchester
- Listed pubs in Greater Manchester
