= Listed buildings in Eccles, Greater Manchester =

Eccles is a town in the City of Salford Metropolitan Borough, Greater Manchester, England. The town, which includes the area of Patricroft, contains 25 listed buildings that are recorded in the National Heritage List for England. Of these, one is listed at Grade I, the highest of the three grades, three are at Grade II*, the middle grade, and the others are at Grade II, the lowest grade.

Eccles is an ancient settlement, and it grew in size during the 19th century with the development of the textile industry in the town. The oldest listed building is a church, and apart from a 17th-century house and a sundial, the others date from the 19th and 20th centuries. The later listed buildings include houses, churches, public houses, a hotel, a library, an aqueduct portal, and a war memorial. Manchester Barton Aerodrome developed in the 1930s, and two surviving structures from this are listed.

== Key ==
Grade	Criteria
I	Buildings of exceptional interest, sometimes considered to be internationally important
II*	Particularly important buildings of more than special interest
II	Buildings of national importance and special interest

== Buildings ==
Name and location	Photograph	Date	Notes	Grade
St Mary's Church; 53.48443°N 2.33458°W		13th century	The church has been altered and extended on a number of occasions, including the rebuilding of the chancel in 1862, and the replacement of the south porch in 1923. It is in sandstone with roofs of slate and lead. The church consists of a nave with a clerestory, north and south aisles, a south transeptal chapel, a chancel with chapels and a vestry, a south porch, and a west tower. The tower has three stages, diagonal buttresses, a west door, a west window, clock faces, and an embattled parapet with corner crocketed pinnacles. The nave and aisles also have embattled parapets.	I
Hall's Buildings; 53.48321°N 2.33842°W	—	17th century	Originally a house, later used for other purposes, it is timber framed on a stone plinth with some wattle and daub infill, and has a repairs and additions in brick and a felt roof. There are two storeys, three bays, and a lean-to extension at the rear.	II
Sundial; 53.48419°N 2.33481°W		Late 18th century	The sundial is in the churchyard of St Mary's Church. It is in stone, and consists of a bulbous baluster on a concrete base. There is a bronze dial but the gnomon is broken.	II
Barton Lane Aqueduct Portal; 53.47568°N 2.35416°W	—	1822–1824	The aqueduct portal was built by the Bridgewater Canal Company and moved to its present site in 1894. It is in sandstone and consists of blocked single segmental arch flanked by rusticated buttresses, over which is a moulded cornice and a coped parapet with end piers. On the parapet is an inscribed stone tablet.	II
A. V. Roe House; 53.48254°N 2.35573°W	—	Early 19th century	A house, later offices, in red brick on a projecting plinth with dentilled box gutters and a hipped slate roof. There are two storeys, three bays on the front, two on the sides, and a rear extension. The central doorway has Doric three-quarter columns, a fanlight and an open pediment, and the windows are sashes. The house was the home of James Nasmyth, and later the birthplace of A. V. Roe.	II
Queen's Arms, Patricroft; 53.48500°N 2.35855°W		1828	The public house was built for the Liverpool and Manchester Railway, and altered in the early 20th century. It is in brick with a Welsh slate roof, and has an L-shaped plan. There are two storeys and three bays. The doorway has a round head, to its right is a canted bay window, the windows are sashes, and the right gable has heavy bargeboarding.	II
Railway bridge 53.48459°N 2.36302°W	—	Late 1820s	The bridge was designed by George Stephenson for the Liverpool and Manchester Railway to carry the line over Worsley Road. It is in brick with stone dressings and has a single segmental skew arch with rusticated voussoirs rising from impost bands, and has bands continuing on the flanking pilasters.	II
Monks' Hall; 53.48637°N 2.33957°W	—	c. 1840	The house, later used for a time as a museum, incorporates a 17th-century timber framed building. It is in brick with a roughcast front on a projecting plinth, with rusticated quoins, a coped parapet, and a stone-slate roof. It has two storeys, a symmetrical front of three bays, a single-storey extension to the left, and a parallel timber-framed range at the rear. In the centre is a porch with a Tudor arched head, and a door with a fanlight. The ground floor contains canted bay windows, and on the upper floor are sash windows with a central mullion and a hood mould. There is a central gablet.	II
St James' Church; 53.48896°N 2.32004°W		1860–61	The church is in yellow sandstone with a tiled roof, and is in Gothic style. It consists of a nave with a clerestory, north and south lean-to aisles, a lower chancel with flanking chapels, and a detached northwest steeple. The steeple has a three-stage tower with angle buttresses, a north doorway, and a broach spire with lucarnes. The windows on the sides of the church are lancets, and the east window has five lights with Decorated tracery.	II
Monton Unitarian Church; 53.49295°N 2.35560°W		1873–1875	A Unitarian church designed by Thomas Worthington in Gothic Revival style. It is in stone with a slate roof and has a cruciform plan. The church consists of a nave with a clerestory, north and south aisles, north and south transepts, a chancel with a polygonal apse, and a southwest steeple. The steeple is 150 feet (46 m) tall, and has a tower with three stages, angled buttresses, a south doorway, a coped parapet, and a broach spire with lucarnes. At the west end of the north aisle is an octagonal stair turret with a conical roof.	II*
Stanley Arms; 53.48161°N 2.35705°W		Late 19th century	The public house, which was remodelled in about 1910, incorporates a former house to the south. It is in red brick with a slate roof, the pub has three storeys, and the former house has two. The building is on a corner site, with one bay on Liverpool Road, three bays on Eliza Ann Street, and a canted bay on the corner; the former house has a further three bays. The original windows have been replaced, and internally are Art Nouveau features.	II
St Andrew's Church; 53.48513°N 2.34218°W		1879	The church was designed by Herbert Tijou in Gothic Revival style, and the tower was completed in 1889 by J. S. Crowther. It is in stone with a slate roof, and consists of a nave and a chancel under a continuous roof with a clerestory, north and south aisles, a gabled south porch, and a southeast tower. The chancel has a polygonal apse. The tower has four stages, buttresses that rise to form octagonal piers with crocketed pinnacles, a four-light window, a rose window, trefoil friezes, and a pierced embattled parapet.	II*
Former Monton Memorial Schools; 53.49313°N 2.35632°W	—	1888	The school was designed by Thomas Worthington and J. G Elwood in Gothic Revival style. It is in stone with a slate roof, and has two storeys, and a front of eight bays with two bays on the sides. The entrance is through a single-storey arcaded porch that has circular columns with moulded capitals, a hood mould and a coped parapet. The flanking bays are gabled, some of the windows are lancets, some are mullioned and transomed, and others are casements.	II
Barton Bridge, Barton Aqueduct and control tower 53.47481°N 2.35229°W		c. 1894	Two swing bridges in parallel crossing the Manchester Ship Canal, designed by Leader Williams. The road bridge carries Barton Road (B5211), and the aqueduct carries the Bridgewater Canal, and both swing on a central axis. The road bridge has a bow-string lattice girder on each side of the roadway, and the aqueduct has a boxed lattice girder and a channel that remains full of water on swinging. On the north side of the Ship Canal is a brick control tower with four storeys, two bays on each side, and a pyramidal roof.	II*
Lychgate, Monton Unitarian Church; 53.49239°N 2.35575°W		1895	The lychgate is at the entrance to the churchyard. It is in stone and in Gothic Revival style. The lychgate has a pointed archway with a gable and a cross finial on each side. The archway is moulded, and has colonnettes and a hood mould. The gable is coped and contains a carved figure in a niche and an inscription. The gates are in cast iron and are elaborately decorated.	II
Crown Theatre; 53.48334°N 2.34344°W		1898	The theatre, later used for other purposes, is in red brick with terracotta dressings, and is in Renaissance Revival style. There are four storeys and a front of five bays, the left bay rising to a tower with corner pilasters, a moulded cornice and a curved parapet. Above the ground floor is a canopy, and on the first floor are three mullioned and transomed windows with semicircular heads. The upper floor contains small rectangular openings, and at the top are three circular windows with moulded surrounds, scrollwork and swags. The building was in poor state of repair in November 2019. The building was damaged further by a large fire on 1 December 2019. Developers planned to convert the site into apartments by the end of 2020. Delayed by Covid, conversion to apartments now in progress June 2024.	II
Grapes Hotel; 53.47862°N 2.36471°W		1903	The public house is in red brick with red terracotta dressings, it has a slate roof with red ridge tiles, and is in Jacobean style. The building is on a corner site, with a rectangular plan, two storeys with cellars, a front of four irregular bays, and mullioned and transomed windows. The first bay has a canted bay window and a shaped gable with a finial. The second bay is recessed and contains a porch with a pedimented parapet containing a dated shield. In the third bay are decorative panels between the floors, and the fourth bay is canted and contains a doorway. At the top is a balustraded parapet.	II
Royal Oak public house 53.48191°N 2.34033°W		1904	A red brick public house with buff terracotta dressings and a slate roof, hipped to the right, in Edwardian Baroque style. It is on a corner site, with a trapezoid plan, a modillion cornice, a parapet, two storeys and cellars, a front of five bays with a canted corner bay, and six bays in the right return. The doorway has an architrave and a segmental pediment, and the windows are sashes. In the corner bay is an inscribed and dated plaque.	II
Lamb Hotel; 53.48345°N 2.33341°W		1906	The public house is in red brick with dressings in sandstone and terracotta, and has a slate roof with red ridge tiles. It is on a corner site, with a trapezoid plan, two storeys, a front of five bays, a moulded cornice, and a parapet with shaped gables and a balustrade. In the centre is a doorway with pilasters, a segmental pediment and a cornice on consoles, above which is an oriel window with a dome cap and a broken pediment, and an upstand with a segmental pediment containing a lamb and the date. The windows are sashes, and on the roof is a cupola with a lead domed roof.	II
Central Library; 53.48292°N 2.33911°W		1907	The library, built with a grant from Andrew Carnegie, and designed by Edward Potts, was extended in 1971. It is in red brick with dressings in terracotta and stone and a stone-slate roof, and is in mixed Renaissance style. There are two storeys, five bays, and extensions to the left and rear. The doorway has Ionic half-columns, and an open pediment with a coat of arms. Flanking the doorway are ornate pilasters rising to a cornice, and a parapet with scrolled coping and decorative panels. On the ground floor are Venetian windows in arches, and on the upper floor are paired windows with Ionic columns. The fifth bay is recessed, and the fourth bay projects forward as a large canted bay window with a swag frieze. On its top is balustrade, behind which is an octagonal belvedere with a domed roof.	II
St Mary Magdalene's Church, Winton; 53.49120°N 2.36909°W	—	1913	The church is in sandstone, it has a slate roof with stone coping, and is in Perpendicular style. It consists of a nave with a clerestory and a narthex, north and south aisles, a north vestry and transept, a south Lady chapel and transept, a chancel, and an unfinished tower at the crossing.	II
War memorial 53.48282°N 2.33869°W		c. 1920	The war memorial was designed by John Cassidy. It is in Portland stone, and consists of the bronze statue of the angel of Victory holding a palm, and standing on a tall tapering square shaft on a moulded plinth. On the front of the shaft is a bronze panel with the figure of a soldier in battledress in low relief, and below it is an inscribed plaque.	II
Main hangar and workshops, Barton Aerodrome; 53.47037°N 2.38590°W	—	1930	The earliest civil aviation aircraft hangar in England, it has a steel-framed structure with brick walls and a sheet roof. The hangar has 13 bays, and is about 70 metres (230 ft) long, 35 metres (115 ft) wide, and 10.5 metres (34 ft) tall. To the northeast is a single-storey workshop, and on the south gable end of the hangar is a stone plaque with a coat of arms.	II
Office, Barton Aerodrome	—	1930	An airport terminal building converted from a farm building, and later used as offices, it is in red brick with a Welsh slate roof. The building has an L-shaped plan and a single storey. It contains doorways and transomed windows.	II
Control tower, Barton Aerodrome; 53.47085°N 2.38719°W		c. 1937	The control tower is in brick with a roof of reinforced concrete. It is octagonal with three stages, and stands on a podium with four radiating wings. The tower has a glazed upper stage, a concrete balcony and steel railings, and access is by an external stairway.	II
