= Bev Wilson (footballer) =

English footballer

Personal information
- Full name: Bevis Alan McLean Wilson
- Date of birth: 14 May 1924
- Place of birth: Eccles, Lancashire, England
- Date of death: 27 August 1987 (aged 63)
- Place of death: Barrow, England
- Position: Centre-back

Senior career*
Years	Team	Apps	(Gls)
1947–1951	Wrexham	98	(0)
1951–1959	Barrow	307	(1)
- Yeovil Town
- * Club domestic league appearances and goals

Bevis Alan McLean "Bev" Wilson (14 May 1924 – 27 August 1987) was an English professional footballer who played as a centre-back. He made over 400 appearances in the English Football League with Wrexham and Barrow.

== Career ==
He signed for Wrexham in June 1947 after playing in the army team during World War 2. He spent nearly 4 years at the Welsh club before signing for Barrow in 1951, where he played over 300 games in 8 years.

In 1959 he moved to non-league Yeovil Town.
