= Eccles Town Hall =

Municipal building in Eccles, Greater Manchester, England

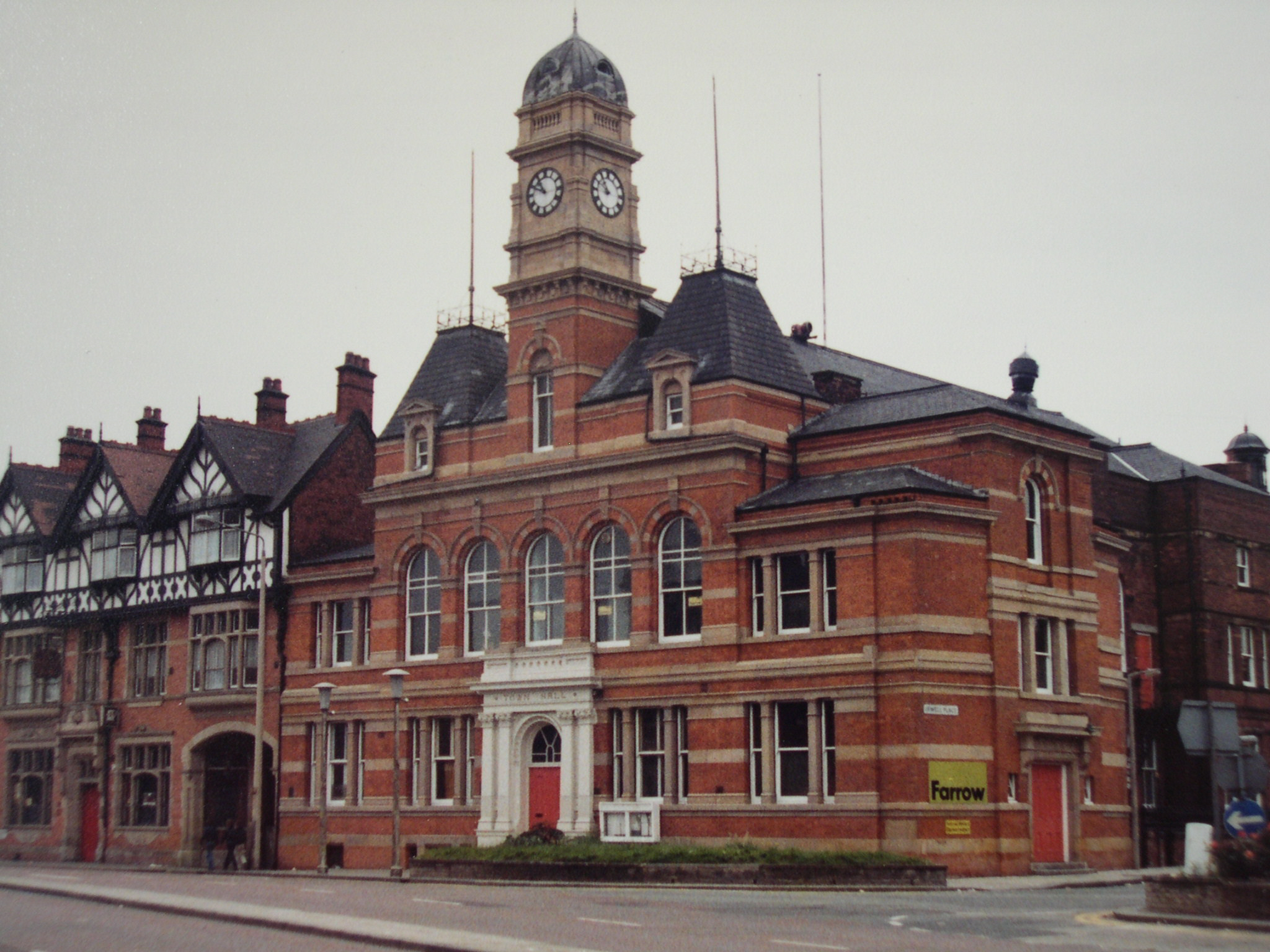
- Eccles Town Hall

- Shown in Greater Manchester
- 53.4826°N 2.3379°W
- Location: Church Street, Eccles

History
- Built: 1881

Site notes
- Architect: John Lowe
- Architectural style: Edwardian Baroque style

Eccles Town Hall is a municipal building in Church Street, Eccles, Greater Manchester, England. The town hall was the headquarters of Eccles Borough Council until the council was abolished in 1974.

== History ==
Shortly after it had been created in 1854, the local board of health established itself in some rented rooms in Patricroft. After civic leaders found these rooms inadequate, in the context of population growth associated with the expanding textile industry, they decided to procure a new town hall: the site they selected had been occupied by the old cockpit in the town. Although cockfighting had been regarded as cruel by the early 19th century, it was still popular in Eccles at that time.

The new building was designed by John Lowe in the Edwardian Baroque style, built in red brick by Moore and Sons and was officially opened on 3 November 1881. The building became the headquarters of Eccles Metropolitan Borough when it was formed in 1892. The design involved a symmetrical main frontage with seven bays facing onto the Church Street; the central section of five bays, which slightly projected forward, featured a doorway with a fanlight on the ground floor flanked by two pairs of Corinthian order stone pilasters supporting a stone entablature with the inscription "Town Hall"; there were five round headed windows forming an arcade on the first floor, and at roof level there was a central clock tower with a cupola (containing a Thwaites & Reed chiming clock), flanked by dormer windows with mansard roofs above. Initially, the principal room was the assembly hall; the building was extended to the rear to create a new council chamber and courtroom in 1899.

King George V and Queen Mary visited the town hall in 1913 and Lord Derby encouraged local military recruitment by conducting a review of the 20th Battalion Lancashire Fusiliers outside the town hall on 18 June 1915 during the First World War. King George VI and Queen Elizabeth also met civic leaders there in 1938 shortly before the Second World War.

The building continued to serve as the headquarters of Eccles Borough Council but ceased to be the local seat of government when the enlarged Salford City Council was formed in 1974. The building subsequently fell into a state of disrepair until its management passed to a special purpose entity, Eccles Community Hall Organisation, in July 2010. Following the refurbishment of the assembly hall, with the support of the Heritage Lottery Fund, in 2012, it became a regular concert venue with programmes that included the works of Antonio Vivaldi, Pyotr Ilyich Tchaikovsky, Fritz Kreisler and Edward Elgar performed by the BBC Philharmonic in November 2015.
