= Monton Unitarian Church =

Listed church in Greater Manchester, England

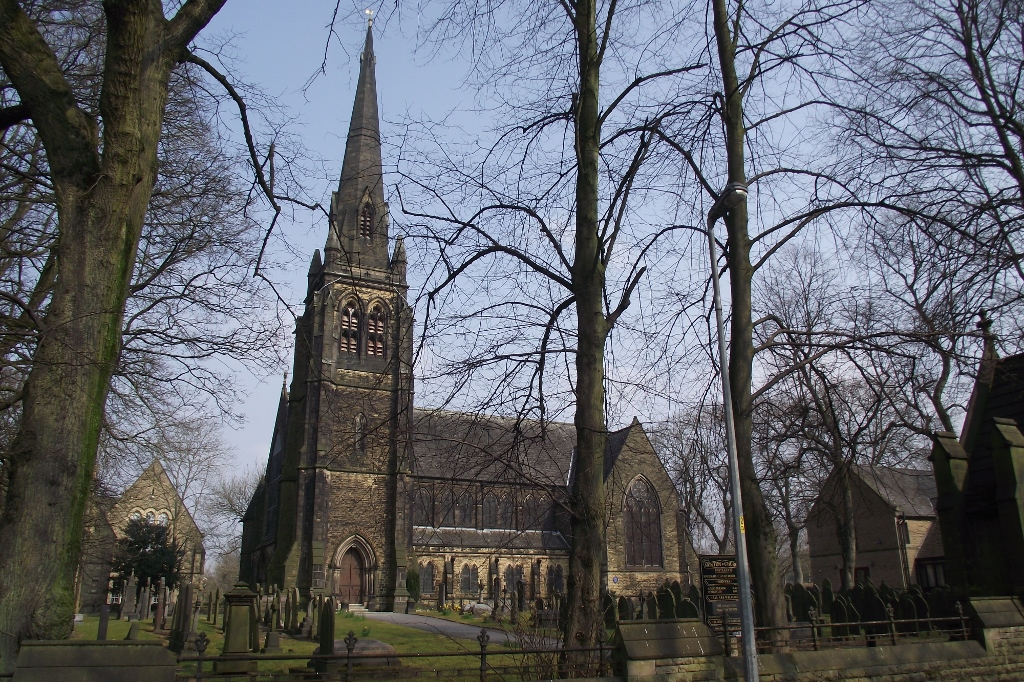
- The church in 2013

- Location in Greater Manchester
- 53.4929°N 2.3556°W
- OS grid reference: SJ 76504 99638
- Address: Monton Green, Monton, Greater Manchester
- Country: England
- Denomination: Unitarian
- Website: montonunitarianchurch.co.uk

History
- Founded: 23 September 1875; 150 years ago

Architecture
- Heritage designation: Grade II*
- Designated: 9 July 1979
- Architect: Thomas Worthington
- Architectural type: Church
- Style: Gothic Revival
- Years built: 1873–1875; 151 years ago

Specifications
- Materials: Stone, slate

Monton Unitarian Church is a Unitarian church on Monton Green in Monton, a village in the City of Salford, Greater Manchester, England. Built between 1873 and 1875 to the designs of Thomas Worthington, it is an example of Gothic Revival architecture and is regarded as one of the architect's most accomplished Nonconformist churches. It is recorded in the National Heritage List for England as a Grade II* listed building.

== History ==
Monton Unitarian Church has a long tradition of Protestant dissent, with its origins traced to a congregation established in 1668. Four successive places of worship have occupied the present site. The first chapel at Monton was established after the Toleration Act 1688, when the Eccles Presbyterians appointed a minister and met in private buildings until two local families purchased land at Monton Green and built a licensed chapel in 1698. A second chapel replaced it after the Jacobite rising of 1715, when a large mob ransacked the building; the congregation obtained government compensation and rebuilt a larger church, where the Rev. Jeremiah Aldred served until his death in 1729.

The congregation's beliefs shifted from Calvinism through Arianism to the appointment of its first Unitarian minister, Harry Toulmin, in 1786, with Unitarianism later legalised in 1813 and secured by the Dissenters' Chapels Act 1844. The second chapel was demolished around 1800 and replaced by a third chapel in 1802, which remained in use until the construction of the present church, designed by Thomas Worthington and officially opened on 23 September 1875.

On 9 July 1979, Monton Unitarian Church was designated a Grade II* listed building.

The church continues to serve as a community and heritage venue. It is not part of any diocese or archdiocese; as a Unitarian congregation it operates independently, affiliating instead with the Manchester District Association of Unitarian and Free Christian Churches and the General Assembly of Unitarian and Free Christian Churches.

In September 2025, the church marked the 150th anniversary of the opening of the present building with a programme of public celebrations as part of Heritage Open Days.

== Architecture ==
The church is constructed in rock‑faced stone with ashlar dressings and a roof of slate. Its cruciform plan incorporates aisles, an apsidal chancel, and a south‑west tower positioned outside the line of the aisle. Designed in the Gothic Revival style, the building has a five‑bay nave and aisles with a projecting plinth, weathered buttresses, paired cusped lancet windows to the aisles, and two two‑light clerestory windows with geometrical tracery in each bay. The aisles carry a coped parapet.

The transepts contain four‑light windows and are supported by diagonal buttresses, while the west front has a five‑light window above the main entrance. At the west end of the north aisle, an octagonal stair turret provides access to the organ loft.

The three‑stage, 150-foot (46 m) tower is a prominent feature, with angled buttresses, a south entrance, cusped lancet openings, and paired two‑light belfry windows with transoms. It is surmounted by a broach spire with lucarnes, set behind a coped parapet. The polygonal apse includes two‑light windows and weathered buttresses, with vestries positioned to the north and south.

=== Interior ===
Internally, circular columns carry a double‑chamfered nave arcade; the trusses of the hammerbeam roof above include curved wind‑bracing and tie rods. There is extensive carved timberwork, including the canopied stalls, panelling, pews, pulpit, reredos, and the 1883 organ loft by Forster and Andrews. The church also retains Minton floor tiles, and its original elaborate iron light standards and other fittings survive as particularly notable features.

The church is noted for its extensive and varied stained‑glass scheme, largely by Heaton, Butler and Bayne. The south transept contains a large window depicting the Sermon on the Mount, with four smaller scenes below showing Jesus in the synagogue; Jesus and the woman at the well; the Good Samaritan; and the Pharisee and the Publican. The north transept includes windows of 'Suffer the Little Children' and 'Feed My Sheep'.

The clerestory windows follow an unusual scheme: those on the north side depict figures from Greek, Roman, Renaissance, and modern history, while those on the south portray representatives of Early Christian, Roman Catholic, Anglican, and Nonconformist traditions.

== Associated lychgate ==
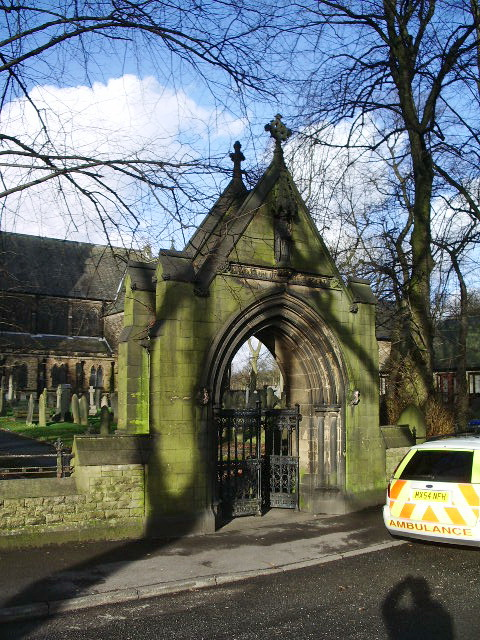
Lychgate

A lychgate constructed in 1895 stands at the entrance to the churchyard and is separately listed at Grade II. Built in stone and designed in the Gothic Revival style, it features a moulded pointed archway with colonnettes and a hood mould, set beneath a coped gable topped by cross finials. The gable contains a carved figure in a niche along with an inscription "In memory of Henry Leigh". The cast iron gates are elaborately decorated.

== See also ==
- Grade II* listed buildings in Greater Manchester
- Listed buildings in Eccles, Greater Manchester
