= Barton Power Station =

Coal plant in England

- Country: United Kingdom
- Coordinates: 53°28′23″N 2°20′56″W
- Status: Decommissioned
- Commission date: 1923
- Decommission date: 18 March 1974
- Owners: Manchester Corporation; British Electricity Authority; Central Electricity Authority; Central Electricity Generating Board

Thermal power station
- Turbine technology: Steam turbine
- Chimneys: 2
- Cooling source: Canal water

Power generation
- Nameplate capacity: 69 MW
- Annual net output: 72.15 GWh (1972)

Barton Power Station was a coal-fired power station on the Bridgewater Canal in Trafford Park, near Eccles, Lancashire, England.

== History ==
The construction of the station began in 1920 and operation began in 1923. The station's original equipment consisted of three Metropolitan-Vickers 27.5 MW turbo-alternators, nine Babcock & Wilcox chain-grate stoked boilers, Mather & Platt auxiliary equipment and British Thomson-Houston switchgear. The station supplied electricity to an area of 3,100 square kilometers and was one of the most advanced power stations of the time. Coal was delivered to the station in barges, using the Bridgewater Canal. Steam condensing and cooling was by water abstracted from the canal.

The station was extended in 1928 with the addition of a three new Babcock & Willcox boilers at 130,000Ib/hr. One of the boilers uses pulverised fuel the others uses conventional graters. This powers a Metropolitan-Vickers a 40 MW 6,600-volt turbo alternator with a 1 MW house set on the same shaft.

This bought the installed capacity up to 122.5 MW.

in 1938 a further extension was made with a Metropolitan Vickers 50 MW set wound for 33,000 Volts and fed by two 200,000 Ib/hr boilers.

Station electricity output 1946–63, GWh
| Year | 1946 | 1955 | 1956 | 1957 | 1958 | 1959 | 1961 | 1962 | 1963 | 1967 |
|---|---|---|---|---|---|---|---|---|---|---|
| Output, GWh | 490.7 | 273.5 | 228.75 | 224.05 | 188.44 | 341.51 | 127.5 | 67.9 | 114.8 | 191.2 |

In 1972 it had one 39 MW operational set and one 51.5 MW set. Thee boilers delivered 770,000 lb/h (97 kg/s) of steam at 350 psi (24.1 bar) and 371/441 °C. In that year the station sent out 72.149 GWh, the load factor was 11.9 per cent and the thermal efficiency was 17.86 per cent.

The station was closed on 18 March 1974 with a reduced generating capacity of 69 MW. At the time the station was co-firing oil. The station was then demolished in 1978 and 1979. The first chimney was demolished in June 1979. A B&Q store now stands on the site of the station.

== See also ==
- Timeline of the UK electricity supply industry
- List of power stations in England
- List of pre-nationalisation UK electric power companies
- National Grid (UK)
- Stuart Street power station
