= Monton =

Village in Greater Manchester, England

Coordinates: 53.49°N 2.35°W

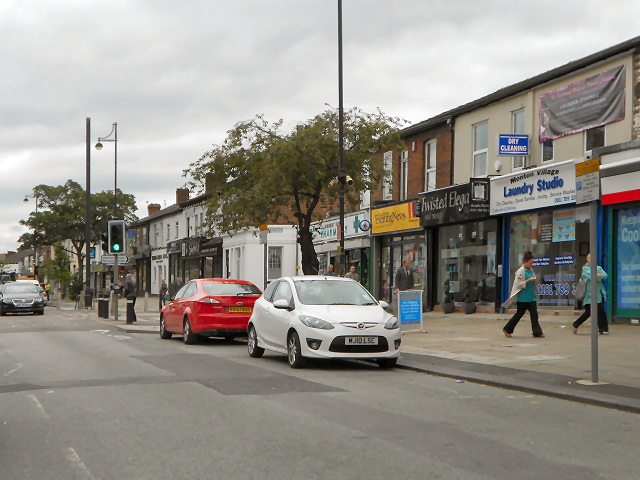
- Monton Road in 2011

- Location within Greater Manchester
- OS grid reference: SJ767994
- Metropolitan borough: City of Salford
- Metropolitan county: Greater Manchester
- Region: North West
- Country: England
- Sovereign state: United Kingdom
- Post town: MANCHESTER
- Postcode district: M30
- Dialling code: 0161
- Police: Greater Manchester
- Fire: Greater Manchester
- Ambulance: North West
- UK Parliament: Worsley and Eccles

Monton is a village in the City of Salford, Greater Manchester, England. It is contiguous with nearby Eccles, Salford and Swinton.

== Geography and administration ==
Historically in Lancashire, Monton was administered by the municipal borough of Eccles until its abolition in 1974. The name Monton is of Saxon origin.

A conservation area includes Monton Green; the Unitarian Church and a former school with caretaker's house; a lodge, built in 1875 to the Earl of Ellesmere's former estate, and a club-house with bowling green. The Green, once used as common land, is now formally laid out as gardens and lawns.

== Community ==
The community is represented by the Monton Village Community Association, originally named the Monton Traders' Association, it was renamed to include both residents and traders.

The association has a gardening group that maintains the flowerbeds and greens on a voluntary basis. The association organises an annual themed festival on the first Saturday of July each year and a parallel music festival which was in 2008 from 26 June to 6 July. The festival presents all genres of music from classical to Indie. The Monton Music Festival was then combined into the larger Salford Music Festival. Recently alongside the gentrification of Salford a number of popular bars and restaurants have opened up in the village attracting new trade into the village from the surrounding areas.

== Churches ==
The Anglican church in Monton is dedicated to St Paul the Apostle.

Monton Church, Monton Green, Eccles

The present Unitarian Church is the fourth church on the site. It was built in the early 1870s and is renowned for its stained glass windows. The south transept shows the Sermon on the Mount with four smaller windows beneath depicting:

- Jesus in the Synagogue
- Jesus with the Lady at the Well
- The Good Samaritan
- The Publican and the Pharisee.

The north transept shows Jesus and Children – 'Suffer the Little Children'; and Jesus and Peter – 'Feed my Sheep'. The clerestory windows on the north side show famous men from the Greek, Roman, Renaissance and Modern periods. On the south side, the clerestory windows show representatives from the Early Christian, Roman Catholic, Anglican and nonconformist traditions.

=== Monton Methodist Church ===
The Monton Methodist Church was opened in 1899. Since its construction, the building has been enlarged and modernised. The church celebrated its centenary in 1999 with a year of special services and events.

In 1959 the congregation was joined by members of Eccles Wesley Methodist Church after their building was demolished to allow for the construction of the M602 motorway. Further congregations joined following the closure of nearby Methodist churches: Eccles Immanuel Methodist Church in 2002, Worsley Road Methodist Church in 2014, Manchester Road Methodist Church in 2019, and Patricroft Methodist Church in 2021.

History

After the Act of Uniformity 1662 Edmund Jones, Vicar of Eccles, was an ejected minister. He and others continued to meet in the Eccles area including Monks Hall. He was imprisoned for his non-conformity and his congregation reported to the local magistrate. He died in 1674.

First chapel

When William and Mary acceded to the throne, the Act of Toleration was passed which allowed nonconformity to be practised under licence. The Eccles Presbyterians appointed a minister and met in a series of private buildings. In 1698 the Lomax and Fildes families, long-term members of the congregation, bought a plot of land at Monton Green. A simple chapel was built and licensed in July 1698.

Second chapel (1715–1802)

In the 1715 Jacobite Rebellion a band of over 100 Jacobites, supporters of the Old Pretender, ransacked the church, having previously destroyed Cross Street Chapel in Manchester. The congregation claimed compensation from the government and rebuilt a bigger and better church. The Rev. Jeremiah Aldred was minister until his death in 1729. His tombstone can be seen in the churchyard.

The congregation's religious views changed from Calvinism through Arianism to the appointment of their first Unitarian minister Harry Toulmin in 1786. In 1813 Unitarianism was legalised and the Nonconformists' Chapels Act 1844 secured the places of worship to Unitarians, allowing the congregation at Monton to officially call themselves Unitarians.

Third chapel

The second chapel was demolished around 1800. The third chapel was built in 1802 and survived until 1875 when the present church was built.

== Transport ==
There was a railway station in Monton called Monton Green, which was part of the Tyldesley Loopline, running from Eccles through Worsley and Roe Green to Leigh. The station opened on 1 November 1887 and was closed under the Beeching Axe on 5 May 1969. Monton Green railway station was located on an embankment, just off Monton Green, the railway running parallel with the Bridgewater Canal. All traces of the station have long since been removed. However, the embankment on which the station was situated is still there and now forms the starting point of the Recreation Pathways scheme, run by Salford City Council. The loopline now forms part of cycle route 55.

The village of Monton is now served by rail services passing through the railway stations at Patricroft and at Eccles, along the Manchester Victoria-Liverpool Lime Street railway line.

Bus services also serve the village, while the nearest Metrolink station is in Eccles (approximately 15 minute walk).

== Landmarks ==
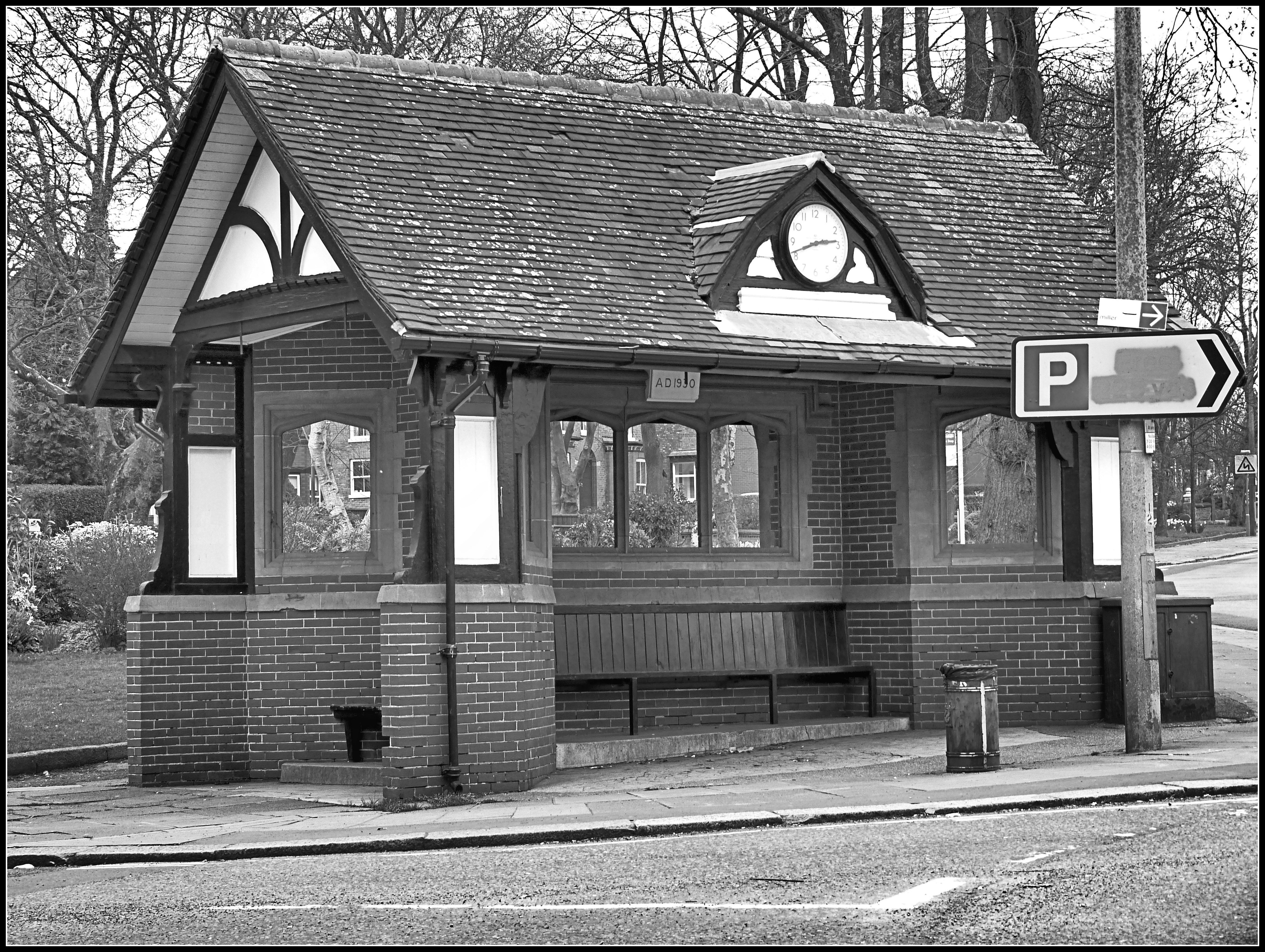
Monton Veterans' Shelter

The local landmarks include the Unitarian Church and the locally named "Old Man's Shelter", both on Monton Green. The Monton Shelter was completed in June 1930 following a campaign by the local vicar and a local councillor for a shelter where 'Veterans of Industry' could meet during inclement weather. The shelter has recently been refurbished. A more recent addition is the Lighthouse built in recent years next to the Bridgewater Canal.

== Sport ==
Monton Cricket Club and Boardman & Eccles Lacrosse Club play in Ellesmere Park at the Welbeck Road site of Monton Sports Club.
