= Ellesmere Park =

Residential area in Eccles, Greater Manchester, England

Coordinates: 53.4936°N 2.336°W

Ellesmere Park is an area of Eccles, in Greater Manchester, England. Historically part of Lancashire, Ellesmere Park today is an affluent, predominantly residential area.

== History ==
Ellesmere Park grew up around the turn of the 20th century. Contemporary views show pleasant, tree-lined roads, protected from the outside world by gates at the main entrances.

Ellesmere Park is an area of approximately 110 acres (45 ha) containing 450–500 properties. About 33% of the housing stock is Victorian, mainly large 2- to 3-storey detached or semi-detached houses/villas, usually standing in extensive grounds.

Salford Council maintains a design guide for Ellesmere Park. The policy was prepared "in response to the decline in the environmental quality of Ellesmere Park which has taken place over recent years".

Inter war (1918–1939) and post war (1945 onwards) housing is also well represented in Ellesmere Park.

The developments of the late 19th and early 20th centuries give the area its characteristic spaciousness and grandeur. The houses are generally of generous (large) proportions and set in large grounds with large separations between them.

There was a strong residents association that worked with the local council to ensure that any development is consistent with the character of the area and that the design policy is closely followed.

== Governance ==
Ellesmere Park was administered by the municipal borough of Eccles until 1974, when the Local Government Act 1972 abolished the borough and it became a part of the metropolitan borough of City of Salford in Greater Manchester.

== See also ==
- Ellesmere Park High School
