= Church of St Mary the Virgin, Eccles =

Church of St Mary the Virgin
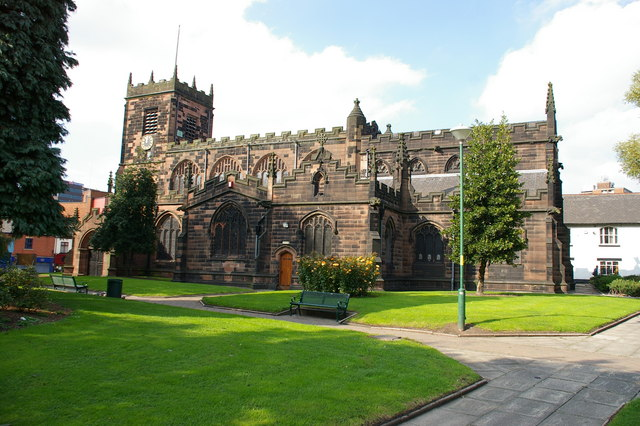
- Church of St Mary the Virgin
- 53.4844°N 2.3346°W
- OS grid reference: SJ 77896 98684
- Location: Eccles, Greater Manchester
- Country: England
- Denomination: Anglican
- Website: Ancient Eccles Parish Church of St Mary the Virgin

History
- Status: Parish church
- Dedication: St Mary the Virgin

Architecture
- Functional status: Active
- Heritage designation: Grade I
- Designated: 24 February 1964
- Architectural type: Church

Specifications
- Materials: Sandstone

Administration
- Province: York
- Diocese: Manchester
- Archdeaconry: Salford
- Deanery: Salford & Leigh
- Parish: Eccles

St Mary the Virgin's Church is an active Anglican parish church in Eccles, Greater Manchester, England. The church is in the Eccles deanery, the archdeaconry of Salford and the diocese of Manchester. Together with St Andrew's, Eccles, St Paul's, Monton, and Christ Church, Patricroft, the church is part of the team benefice of Eccles. The church was granted Grade I Listed status in 1964.

== History ==
St Mary's Church was in medieval times the centre of a large ecclesiastical parish containing Pendleton, Pendlebury, Clifton, Swinton, Worsley and Barton-upon-Irwell. To the west the parish covered a portion of Chat Moss to the River Glaze and was bounded by the River Irwell to its north and east. The church is of ancient origin and was the only church in the parish for several hundred years. A church has occupied its site since Norman times and probably before then. The church contains few remains of its earliest incarnation but the tower base and west end of the north aisle are from the 13th century. The 14th-century structure was enlarged in the 15th century, and the chancel was reconstructed in the 16th century and rebuilt in 1862 by J P Holden.

== Architecture ==
The church is constructed in red ashlar sandstone with slate roofs. Built on a weathered plinth, the church has buttresses and castellated parapets, a three-stage west tower, a four-bay nave and aisles, and the remodelled four-bay chancel has a clerestory. The gabled south transept was originally a chantry chapel and it has a gabled south porch. The south aisle windows have four lights with Perpendicular tracery, and the north aisle windows have five lights, as do the clerestory windows.

The 16th-century 'Entry to Jerusalem' window originated in Rouen, France, and was installed in the now demolished St John's Church, Manchester before being moved to Eccles in 1929. It is also known as the Long Donkey Window.

== See also ==
- List of churches in Greater Manchester
- Grade I listed churches in Greater Manchester
