= Eccles, Greater Manchester =

Town in Greater Manchester, England

Coordinates: 53.4824°N 2.3390°W

Eccles
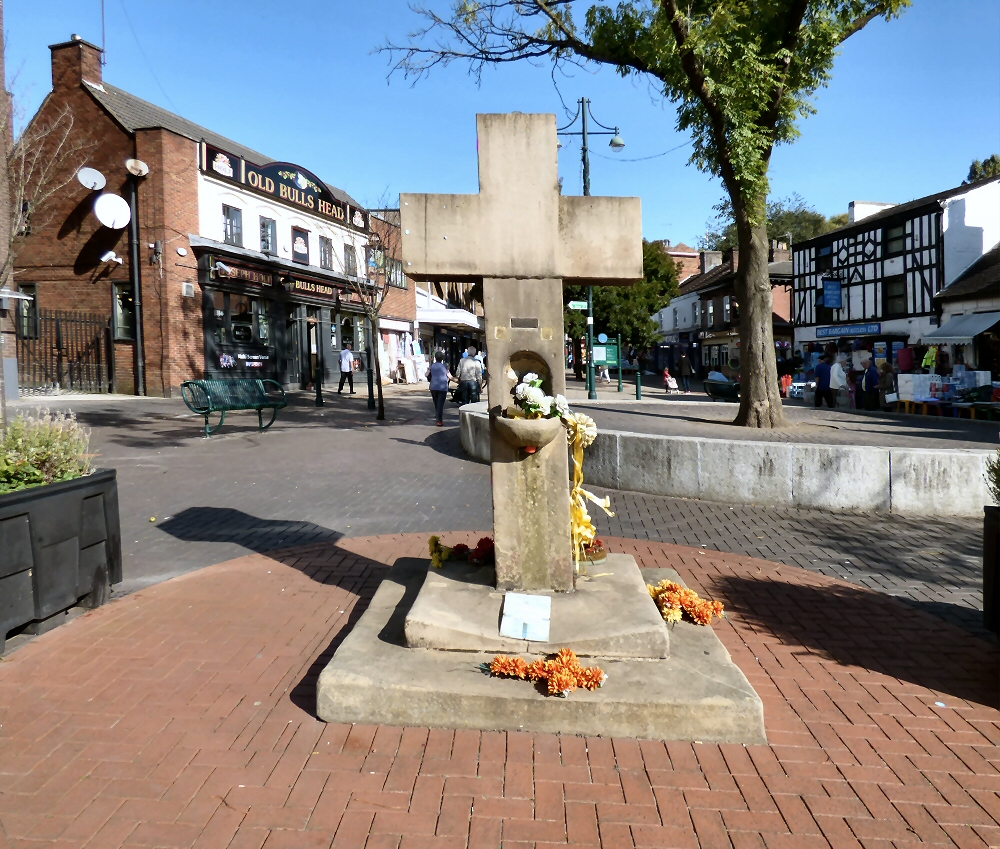
- Eccles Cross

- Location within Greater Manchester
- Population: 38,756 (2011 Census)
- OS grid reference: SJ778986
  - London: 165 mi (266 km) SE
- Metropolitan borough: City of Salford
- Metropolitan county: Greater Manchester
- Region: North West
- Country: England
- Sovereign state: United Kingdom
- Post town: MANCHESTER
- Postcode district: M30
- Dialling code: 0161
- Police: Greater Manchester
- Fire: Greater Manchester
- Ambulance: North West
- UK Parliament: Worsley and Eccles

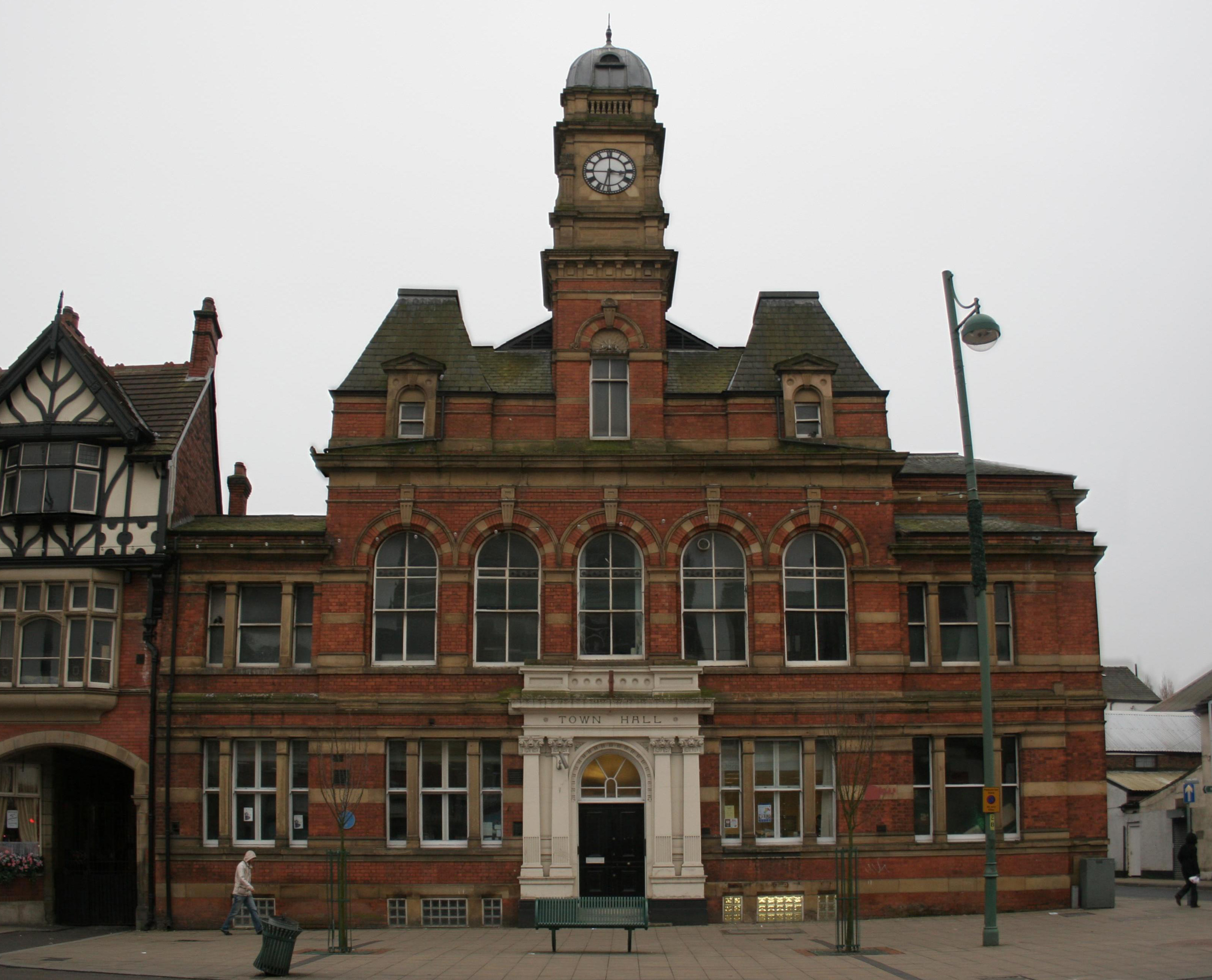
Eccles Town Hall

Eccles (/ˈɛkəlz/) is a market town in the City of Salford in Greater Manchester, England, 3 miles (4.8 km) west of Salford city centre and 4 miles (6.4 km) west of Manchester, split by the M602 motorway and bordered by the Manchester Ship Canal to the south. The town is famous for the Eccles cake.

Eccles grew around the 13th-century Parish Church of St Mary. Evidence of pre-historic human settlement has been discovered locally, but the area was predominantly agricultural until the Industrial Revolution, when a textile industry was established in the town. The arrival of the Liverpool and Manchester Railway led to the town's expansion along the route of the track linking those two cities.

== History ==
=== Toponymy ===
The derivation of the name is uncertain, but two suggestions have been proposed. The received one is that the Eccles place-name is derived from the Romano-British Ecles or Eglys (eglwys in Welsh means 'church'), which in turn is derived from the Ancient Greek ecclesia via the Latin. Following the arrival in AD 613 of the invading Anglo-Saxons in Lancashire, many existing British place-names, especially rivers and hills (the River Irwell for example), survived intact. The root Ecles, found in several village names, could be an example of this. So, the suggestion is that the word denoted the site of a building, or a ruin featuring the landscape, which was recognised by the Anglo-Saxons as a church. Eccles would then have been a village founded around one such, and so Ecles may be the likely source of the modern name. In Kenyon's Origins of Lancashire (1991), however, the author casts doubt on the further suggestion that native British Church administration survived into Anglo-Saxon times, as there is not an exact correlation between Eccles place-names and pre-Domesday hundreds in south Lancashire.

An alternative etymology is derived from that known to belong to Eccles in Kent, recorded as "Aiglessa" in the Domesday Book of 1086 and so conclusively deriving from the Old English (pre 7th century) æc-læas meaning 'oak pasture'.

=== Early history ===
Pre-historic finds in the parish of Eccles include dugout boats found at Barton upon Irwell, an arrowhead, a spear and axes at Winton, which taken together appear to suggest the existence of a hunting and travelling society. Human habitation in the area may extend as far back as 6000 BC, with two separate periods of settlement on Chat Moss, the first around 500 BC and the second during the Romano-British period.

The village may have been founded by refugees from Manchester (Mamucium) during the Diocletianic Persecution in the early 4th century, although excavations in 2001–2005 revealed that the civilian settlement at Manchester had probably been abandoned by the mid-3rd century. Throughout the Dark Ages the parish appears to have been remote enough to be untouched by any local conflicts, while absorbing successive waves of immigrants from nearby towns.

The Manor of Barton upon Irwell once covered a large area; in 1276 it included townships such as Asphull, Halghton, Halliwelle, Farnword, Eccles, Workedele, Withington (latterly Winton), Irwelham, Hulm, Quicklewicke, Suynhul and Swinton. Before this date it would appear to have been even larger, but by 1320 the manor boundaries were described as "Tordhale Siche descending to Caldebroc, then to the pit near Preste Platteforde and then to another pit, then to the ditch of Roger the Clerk, then to the hedge of Richard the Rimeur, then following the hedge to Caldebroc." The manor was originally controlled by the Barton family until about 1292 when by marriage it came into the ownership of the Booth family, who retained it for almost 300 years. In 1586 the Trafford family assumed control of the manor, and established themselves in 1632 at Whittleswick, which was renamed Trafford Park.

The parish of Eccles contained the townships of Barton upon Irwell, Clifton, Pendlebury, Pendleton and Worsley. Toward the end of the Middle Ages the parish had an estimated population of about 4,000 Communicants. Agriculture remained an important local industry, with little change from the Medieval system due to a lack of adequate drainage and fertiliser. No evidence exists to demonstrate the layout of the area, but it would likely have been the same as the surrounding areas of Salford, Urmston and Warrington where oats and barley would have been grown. Local cottage industries included blacksmiths, butchers, thatching, basket weaving, skinning and tanning. Weaving was popular, using linen and wool;merchants traded in corn; badgers bought and sold local produce.

Although the local gentry supported the Royalists, the English Civil War had little effect on the area. Troops would occasionally pass through the parish and there was a skirmish at Woolden, but the only other mention of local involvement was the burial of two (probably) local soldiers in 1643. The Jacobite army passed through in 1745, in its advance and subsequent retreat.

=== Textiles and the Industrial Revolution ===
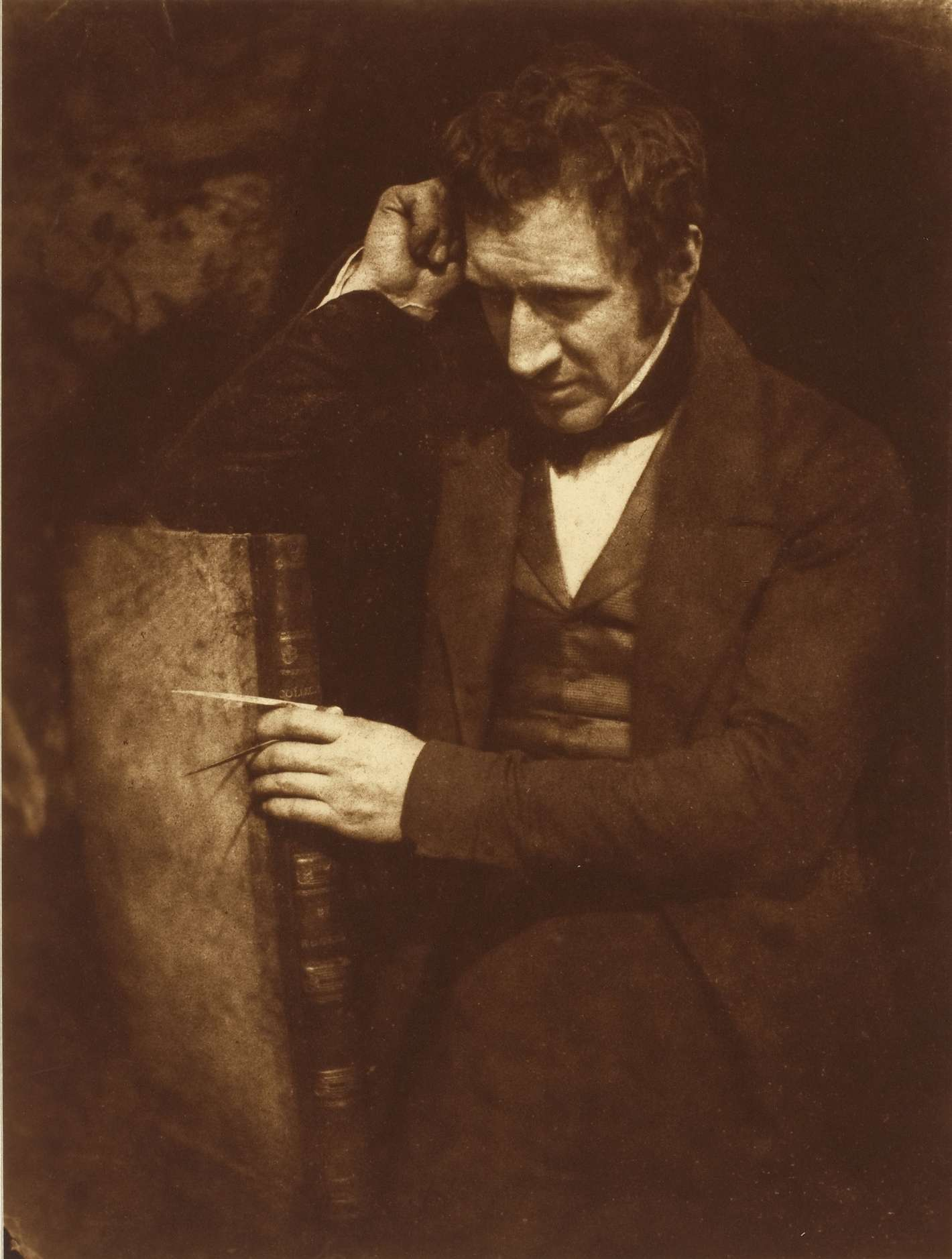
A calotype of James Nasmyth, pictured c. 1844 by Hill & Adamson

In 1795 John Aikin described the area:

The agriculture of the parish is chiefly confined to grazing, and would be more materially benefited by draining; but the tax upon brick, a most essential article in this process, has been a very great hindrance to it. The use of lime—imported from Wales, and brought by the inland navigations to the neighbourhood of our collieries—has become very general in the improvement of the meadow and pasture lands.

During the 18th century the predominance of textiles in the region is partly demonstrated in the parish registers of 1807, which show that 46 children were baptised with 34 fathers employed as weavers. In Memoirs of seventy years of an eventful life (1852) Charles Hulbert wrote:

The principal employment of the working population of Eccles and vicinity at that time, was the manufacture of Cotton Goods on the home or domestic plan. These were not then, according to my present recollection, more than two Spinning Manufactories in Manchester, Arkwright's with its loft chimney, and Douglas's extensive Works, on the River Irwell, near the Broken bank ... At the period of my first residence in Eccles Parish, I believe the above Mills chiefly supplied the Weavers of Eccles and other parishes with twist for warps, which were purchased by the Master Manufacturers.

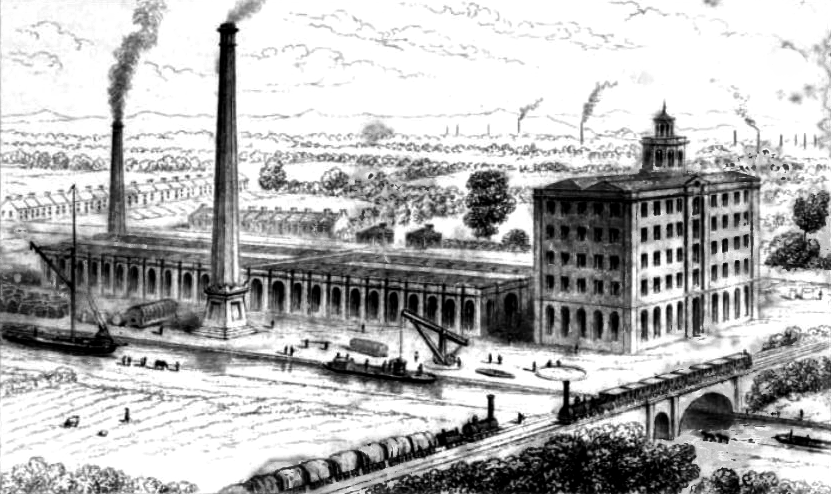
Contemporary view of Nasmyth's Bridgewater Foundry in Patricroft. The Liverpool and Manchester Railway can be seen to the south of the building as it crosses the Bridgewater Canal.

During the early 19th century the growth of industry meant the majority of the area's inhabitants were employed in textiles or trade, while a minority worked in agriculture. The factory system was also introduced; in 1835, 1,124 people were employed in cotton mills, and two mills used power looms. Local hand-produced specialities included striped cotton ticks, checks, Nankeens and Camrays. Two cotton mills are visible on the 1845 Ordnance Survey map of the area. The area also became renowned for its production of silk, with two mills at Eccles and one at Patricroft. Many factory workers were children under 12 years of age.

In 1830 James Nasmyth (son of Alexander Nasmyth) visited the newly opened Liverpool and Manchester Railway, and on his return to Manchester noted the suitability of a site alongside the canal at Patricroft for an engineering works. He and his brother leased the land from Thomas de Trafford, and established the Bridgewater Foundry in 1836. The foundry was completed the following year with a design based upon assembly line production. In 1839 Nasmyth invented the steam hammer, which enabled the manufacture of forgings at a scale and speed not seen before. In the same year the foundry started to manufacture railway locomotives, with 109 built by 1853. Nasmyth died a wealthy man in 1890.

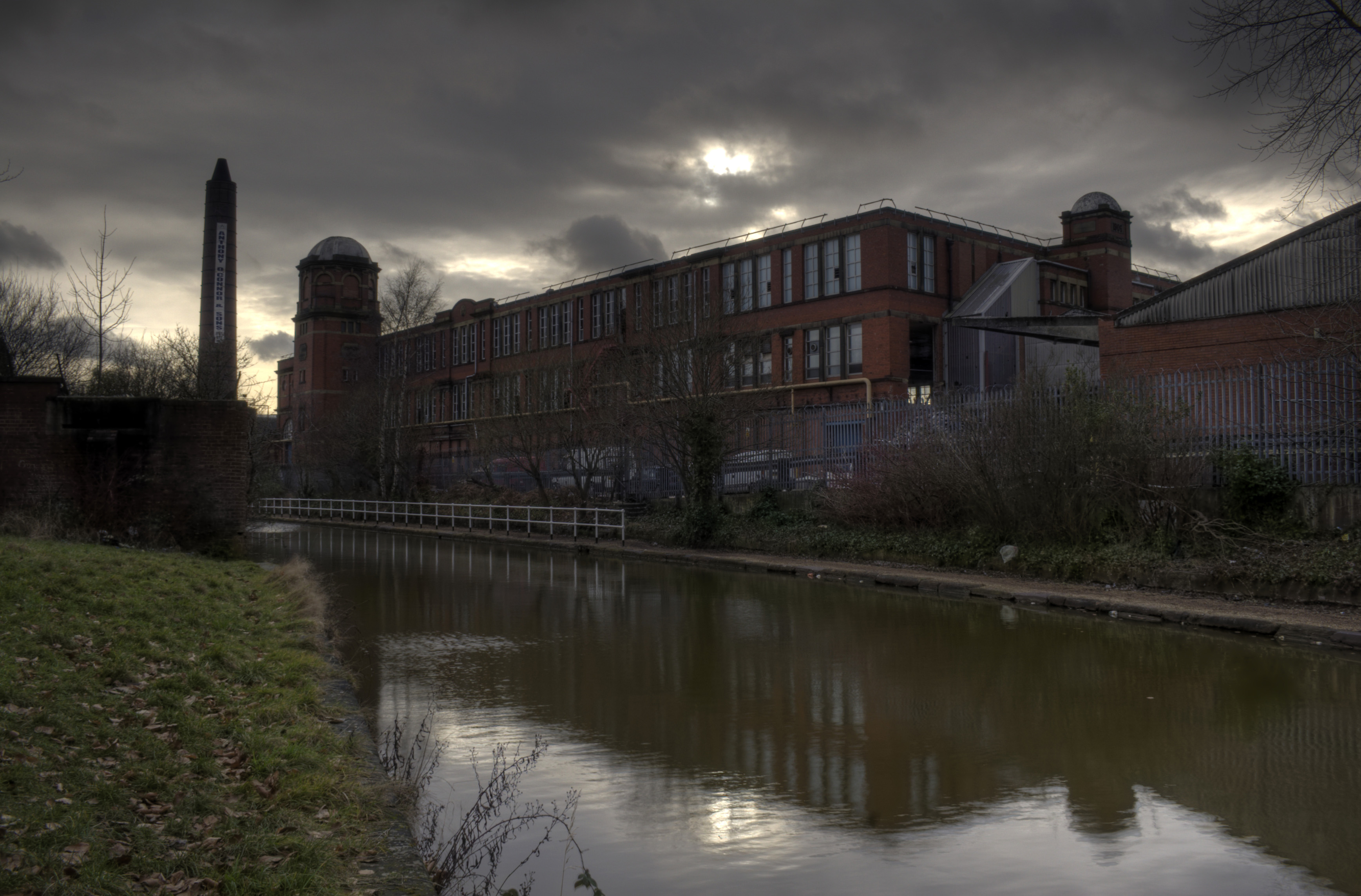
An Edwardian mill alongside the Bridgewater Canal in Winton. Built in 1906 by the Eccles Spinning and Manufacturing Company, the mill was demolished in 2010.

The Eccles Spinning and Manufacturing Company came into being following a meeting called by the Mayor of Eccles, in which concern was expressed at the decline in local industry. Two earlier Eccles mills had been destroyed by fire, resulting in significant local unemployment. Designed by Potts, Son and Hennings of Manchester, Bolton and Oldham, it was opened in 1906. The imposing mill contained a multi-storey spinning mill, engine house and extensive weaving sheds.

Early housing in the village consisted of groups of thatched cottages clustered around and near the parish church. The influx of workers from areas around the village accompanied an increased demand for extra housing. Even after the establishment of the local board of health new properties were often built in the gardens of existing dwellings, leading to severe overcrowding. In 1852 the streets were paved with boulders, sewerage was non-existent, and water supply was a local well. During the latter half of the 19th century new housing was erected alongside the railway, and large areas of open land were soon occupied with new housing estates built for the area's more wealthy residents.

The construction of the Manchester Ship Canal provided many local residents with jobs; 1,888 people were employed on the section of the new canal at Barton. A stone aqueduct over the River Iwell dating from 1761 and designed by James Brindley was demolished and replaced by a new moveable aqueduct: the Barton Swing Aqueduct.

=== Post-industrial history ===
Eccles was not immune to the general decline of the textile industry in the 20th century. The Bridgewater Foundry ceased operations in 1940, taken over by the Ministry of Supply and converted into a Royal Ordnance Factory. The factory closed in the late 1980s, and the land is now occupied by a housing estate.

Eccles is included in the City of Salford's Unitary Development Plan 2004–2016 as part of the western gateway, a major focus for economic development during the plan period. Areas to be developed include the Barton Strategic Regional Site, Dock 9 at Salford Quays, Weaste Quarry near Eccles, and remaining land at Northbank, and the plan provides for improvements which include the A57 – Trafford Park link at Barton and provisional support for a further expansion of the Metrolink system through the area and a link between the A57 and M62 at Barton. Under this plan the town's retail environment would also be maintained and enhanced.

== Governance ==
The coat of arms of the former Eccles Municipal Borough Council

In 1854 the Barton, Eccles, Winton and Monton Local Board of Health was established for the northern part of the township of Barton. Eccles was incorporated as a municipal borough in 1892, part of which was in Barton poor law union, an inter-parish unit established to provide social security, and in 1933 this was expanded to include most of Barton Moss civil parish, and part of Worsley Urban District. A small part of the borough was transferred in 1961 to the County Borough of Salford. In 1974 the borough was abolished and its area transferred to Greater Manchester to form part of the City of Salford.

The Eccles area incorporates the wards of Barton, Winton, and Eccles.

Following its review of parliamentary representation in Greater Manchester, the Boundary Commission for England recommended that Eccles be split between two new constituencies; Salford and Eccles, from the existing Salford constituency and the central/eastern part of Eccles, and Worsley and Eccles South, from the existing Worsley constituency and the southern/western part of Eccles. These took effect at the 2010 general election, then a further boundary revision took place which led to the creation of the present Worsley and Eccles seat for 2024, reuniting representation within one seat.

== Geography ==
Eccles is 3.7 miles (6 km) west of Manchester, on the north bank of the Manchester Ship Canal. The area is along a gentle slope from 160 feet (49 m) above sea level to the north, to 60 feet (18 m) above sea at the south, near the Irwell. The underlying geology is made up of New Red Sandstone and pebble beds. The coal measures of the Lancashire coalfield extend south to Monton and Winton. On the surface deposits of clay and loose sands are prevalent throughout the area, along with vegetable moulds formed by rotted vegetation from the previous ice age. These areas have, when drained, provided fertile soil for local agriculture, benefited by the 19th century practice of dumping nightsoil from nearby Manchester.

Parts of the area are within an indicated floodplain. Eccles' climate is generally temperate, like that of the rest of Greater Manchester. The mean highest and lowest temperatures (13.2 °C (55.8 °F) and 6.4 °C (43.5 °F)) are slightly above the national average, while the annual rainfall (806.6 millimetres (31.76 in)) and average hours of sunshine (1394.5 hours) are respectively above and below the national averages.

== Demography ==
=== Overall ===
At the 2001 Census, Eccles was part of the Greater Manchester Urban Area and had a population of 36,610, of which 17,924 (48.96%) were male and 18,686 (51.04%) female. It occupied 812 hectares, compared with 783 at the 1991 census, a population density of 45.09 people per hectare compared with an average of 40.20 across the Greater Manchester Urban Area. The median age of the population is 37, compared with 36 within the Greater Manchester Urban Area and 37 across England and Wales.

The majority of the population of Eccles was born in England (91.94%); 2.61% were born elsewhere within the United Kingdom, 0.70% within the rest of the European Union, and 2.99% elsewhere in the world.

Data on religious beliefs across the town in the 2001 census show that 77.07% declared themselves to be Christian, 12.05% said they held no religion, and 2.26% reported themselves as Muslim.

Eccles is within the Manchester larger urban zone, and the Manchester travel to work area.

Eccles compared
UK Census 2001	Eccles	Greater Manchester Urban Area	England
Total population	36,610	2,244,931	49,138,831
Born outside UK	5.5%	7.9%	9.2%
White	95.8%	90.3%	91.0%
Asian	2.1%	6.2%	4.6%
Black	0.4%	1.3%	2.3%
Over 75 years old	8.6%	7.1%	7.5%
Christian	77.1%	72.9%	72%
Muslim	2.3%	5.5%	3.1%
Source: Office for National Statistics

Population change in Eccles from 1901 to 2011
Year	1901	1911	1921	1931	1939	1951	1961	1971	1981	1991	2001	2011
Population	34,369	41,944	44,242	44,416	41,512	43,926	43,173	38,511	37,792	36,000	36,610	38,756
Municipal Borough 1901–1971 • Urban Subdivision 1981–2011

=== By ward ===
The Eccles area consists of the wards of Barton, Winton, and Eccles.

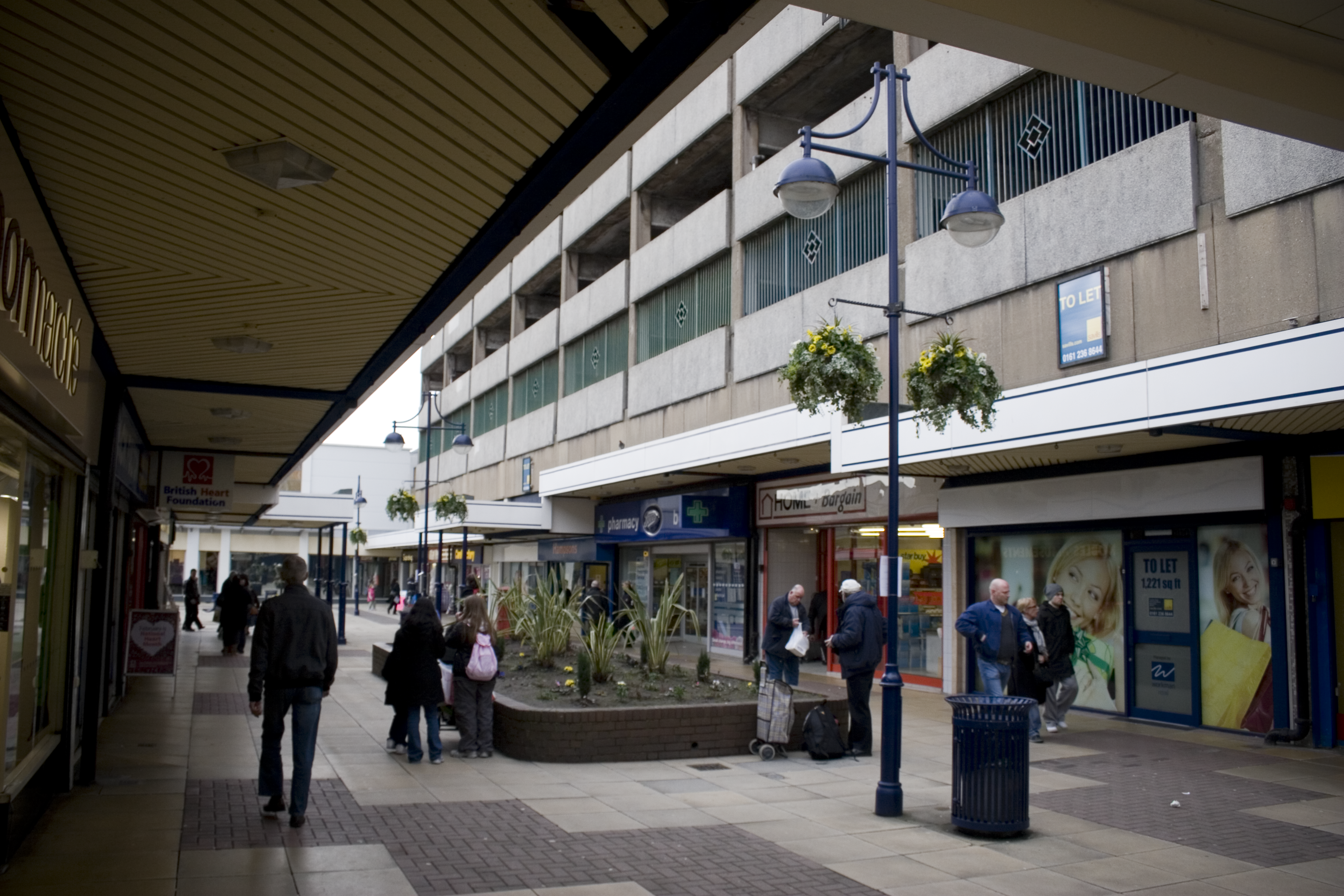
Eccles shopping centre

According to the Office for National Statistics, at the time of the United Kingdom Census 2001, the ward of Eccles had a population of 11,413, of which 5,546 were male, and 5,867 female. The ward of Winton had a population of 12,752, and the ward of Barton had a population of 10,434, giving the larger administrative area of Eccles a total population of 34,599.

Eccles is the ninth-most densely populated ward in Salford, and has the highest number and proportion of people aged 75 and over of all wards in Salford. Levels of crime are below the average for the city. The adult population tends to be more qualified than the city average, and primary and secondary education results are also slightly higher than average for Salford. Unemployment is below average, with people tending to work longer hours. More residents live in purpose-built and converted flats than do in the city as a whole, with a minority occupying detached houses or bungalows. Between 1994 and 2004, 367 homes were added to the ward, above the average for Salford.

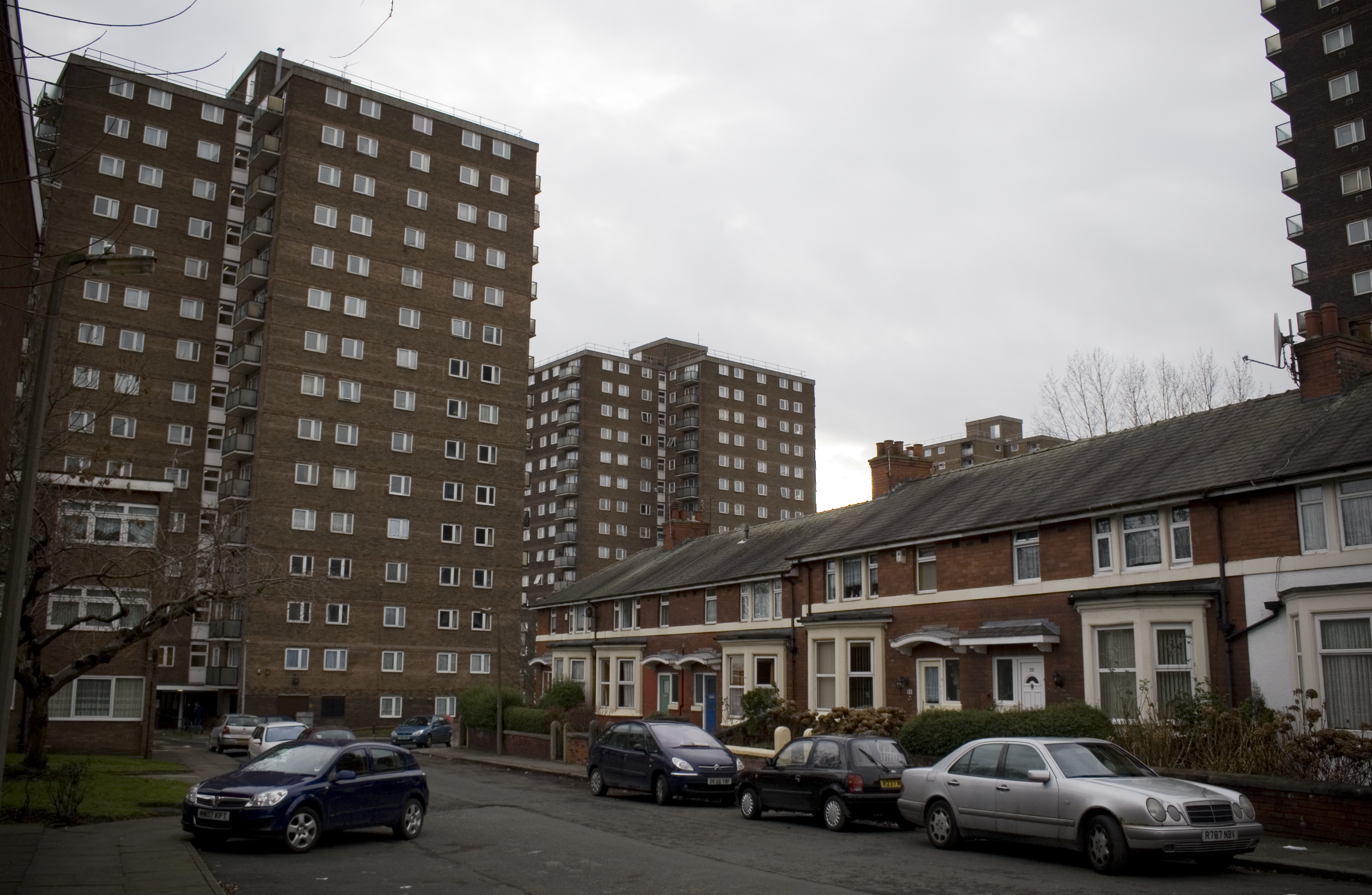
Tower blocks dominate the landscape of Eccles, forming a stark contrast with Victorian brick terraced housing.

Neighbouring Winton is the sixth-most densely populated ward in the region and in 2001 had proportionally more children than the city as a whole. Crime is generally below average, with falling rates of burglary in 2005. Education standards for both adults and children are below city average with minor improvements to GCSE results between 2005 and 2006. Unemployment is higher than average for Salford, with areas of severe income deprivation both to the north and south of the ward. Residents are on average more likely to live in semi-detached housing, with 208 homes added between 1994 and 2004.

To the south, the ward of Barton is the third most densely populated in Salford with little population change between 1991 and 2001. It has proportionally more over-85-year-olds than the city as a whole, with low adult and primary school education standards, but significant improvements in GCSE results of late. Some parts of Barton are amongst the worst 20% of areas in the country for child poverty, with below-city-average childcare provision. Unemployment is higher than average for Salford. Almost half the homes in the ward are terraced housing, with an extra 300 properties built between 1994 and 2004.

== Economy ==
To the east of the town centre, the West One retail park was opened in November 2001 at a cost of £53m. It is in competition with the nearby Trafford Centre and Lowry Outlet Mall, and as a result has suffered a loss of trade. Most of its units were abandoned but following the decision by Tesco to scrap plans for a £30m Tesco Extra store in 2013 a number of new openings have improved the retail offering; The Range, Home Bargains, Smyths Toys Superstores., PureGym and Jollyes Petfood Superstore. A Morrisons supermarket is near the town centre. One of the UK's largest online lighting retailers Value lights, is also located in an 80,000 square foot distribution centre in the centre of Eccles.

Until shortly after its closure was announced on 9 May 2006, the Great Universal Stores group used the former Eccles Spinning and Manufacturing Company building in Winton. Operations have since been transferred to a site in Shaw and Crompton. The town still has a manufacturing industry. Valtris Speciality Chemicals (Ackros Chemicals prior to April 2016), a leading chemical additive supplier and its predecessors have occupied a site on Lankro Way since 1937, the site in Eccles employs more than 100 people working in manufacturing, research, administrative and business management roles. Americhem Europe manufactures colouring for plastics and nylon fibres, employing 75 staff with a turnover of £10m. The Eccles-based insurance broker and financial services specialist CBG Group, which worldwide employs 180 people, has its head office near the town centre. The employment agency Morson Group has its headquarters in Eccles and supplies thousands of employees to various hi-tech employers.

Eccles cakes, first produced and sold in the town in 1796, are now exported across the world.

== Landmarks ==
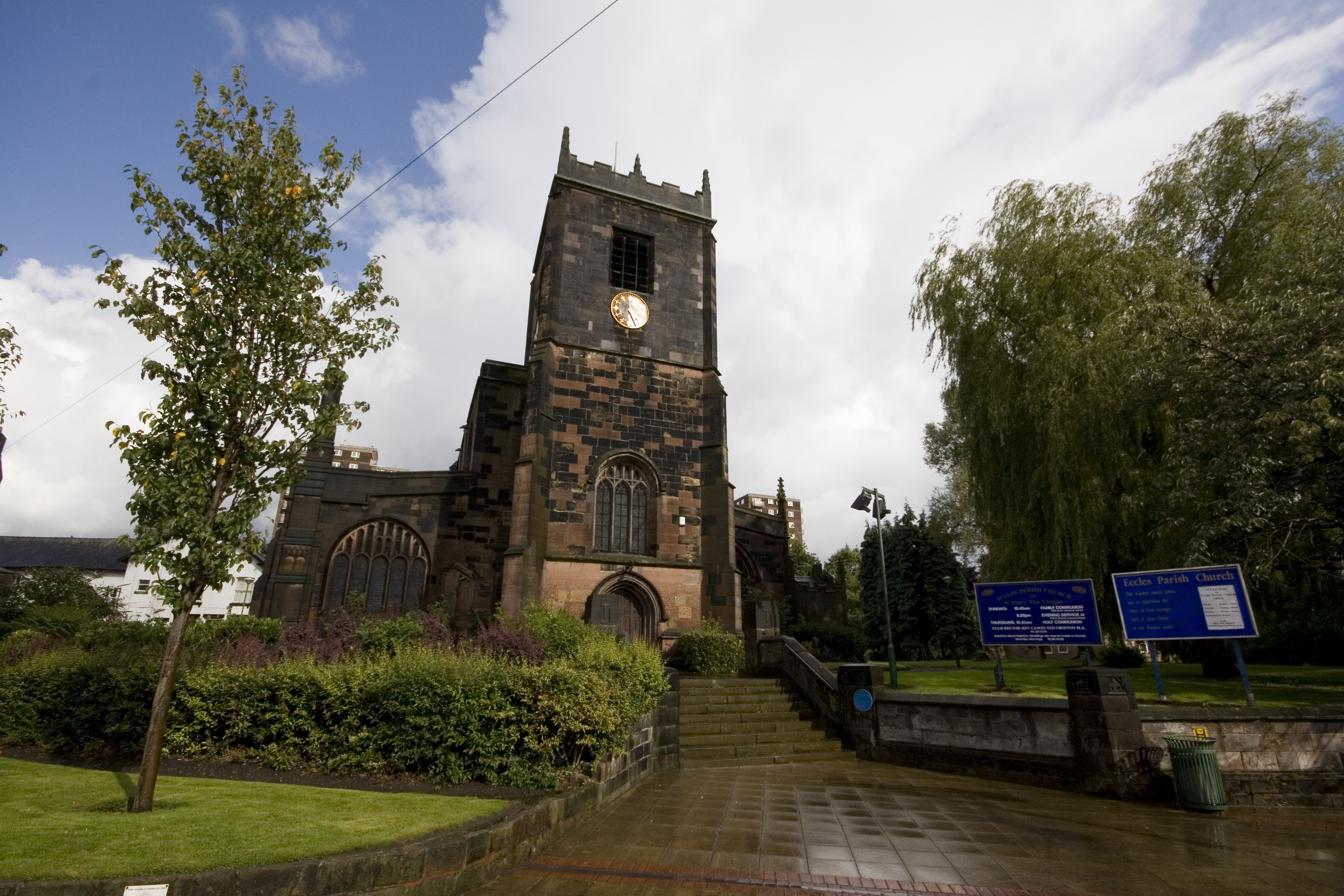
Parish Church of St Mary the Virgin is a historic landmark and the only Grade I listed building in Eccles.

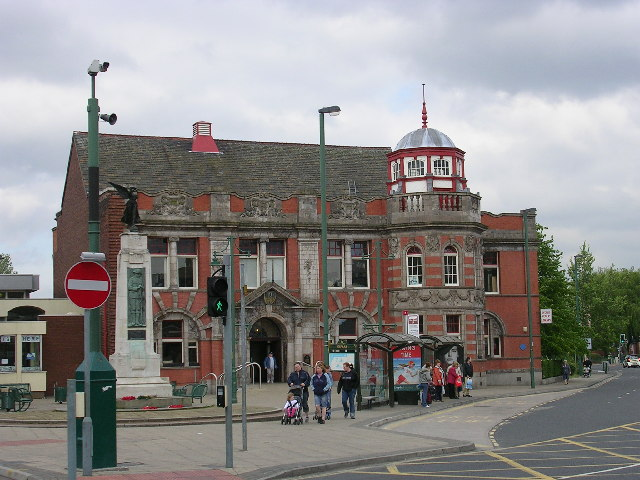
Eccles Library and war memorial

The Parish Church of St Mary the Virgin is the only Grade I listed building in Eccles. There are two Grade II* listed buildings in the Eccles area: Monton Unitarian Church, completed in 1875 by Thomas Worthington; and the Church of St Andrew, completed in 1879 by the architect Herbert Edward Tijou.

The town's war memorial was erected in 1925. Local sculptor John Cassidy was commissioned to design the structure. Built from Portland stone and topped with a bronze figure, it was unveiled by Lord Derby in August 1925. It is now a Grade II listed building.

Eccles Library was built on a slum-clearance site in the town centre. The building was funded by Andrew Carnegie and designed by Edward Potts (who also designed the canalside mill picture above), and it opened on 19 October 1907. Designed in the Renaissance style, it is now a Grade II listed building. Potts had hoped that the building would become "the Eccles University".

The Crown Theatre (formerly the Lyceum) on Church Street is also a Grade II listed building.

Salford City Council has expressed support for efforts to secure UNESCO World Heritage Site status for the historic transport corridor associated with the Liverpool and Manchester Railway. Eccles railway station has undergone restoration work by the 'Friends of Eccles Railway Station', including clean-ups, renovation of the station garden, and a mural.

Both Monton Green and Ellesmere Park are designated conservation areas, and a Site of Biological Importance is located near Rutland Road and Chatsworth Road.

== Transport ==
A painting of the inaugural journey of the Liverpool and Manchester Railway, by A. B. Clayton

The Salford to Warrington turnpike trust was formed in 1752 and assumed control of the road from Pendleton to Irlam. Opinions as to the quality of the road were mainly negative; writing in 1795, John Aikin said "Much Labour and a very great expense of money have been expended on the roads of this parish, but they still remain in a very indifferent state, and from one plain and obvious cause, the immoderate weights drawn in carts and waggons." On the poor quality roads, the Liverpool to Manchester stagecoach took almost an entire day to make the journey. Matters appear to have improved by the 19th century, along with the opening of several more trust roads throughout the parish. In the early part of the 19th century some existing routes were widened and straightened, including the modern-day Regent Road in Salford. All the roads except one were surfaced with boulders. In 1832 a daily omnibus service from Manchester reached Eccles and Pendleton. In 1877, following the laying of tracks in the road, horse-drawn trams were used; these eventually gave way in 1902 to electric trams under the control of the Salford Corporation. Motorised buses were introduced in 1938.

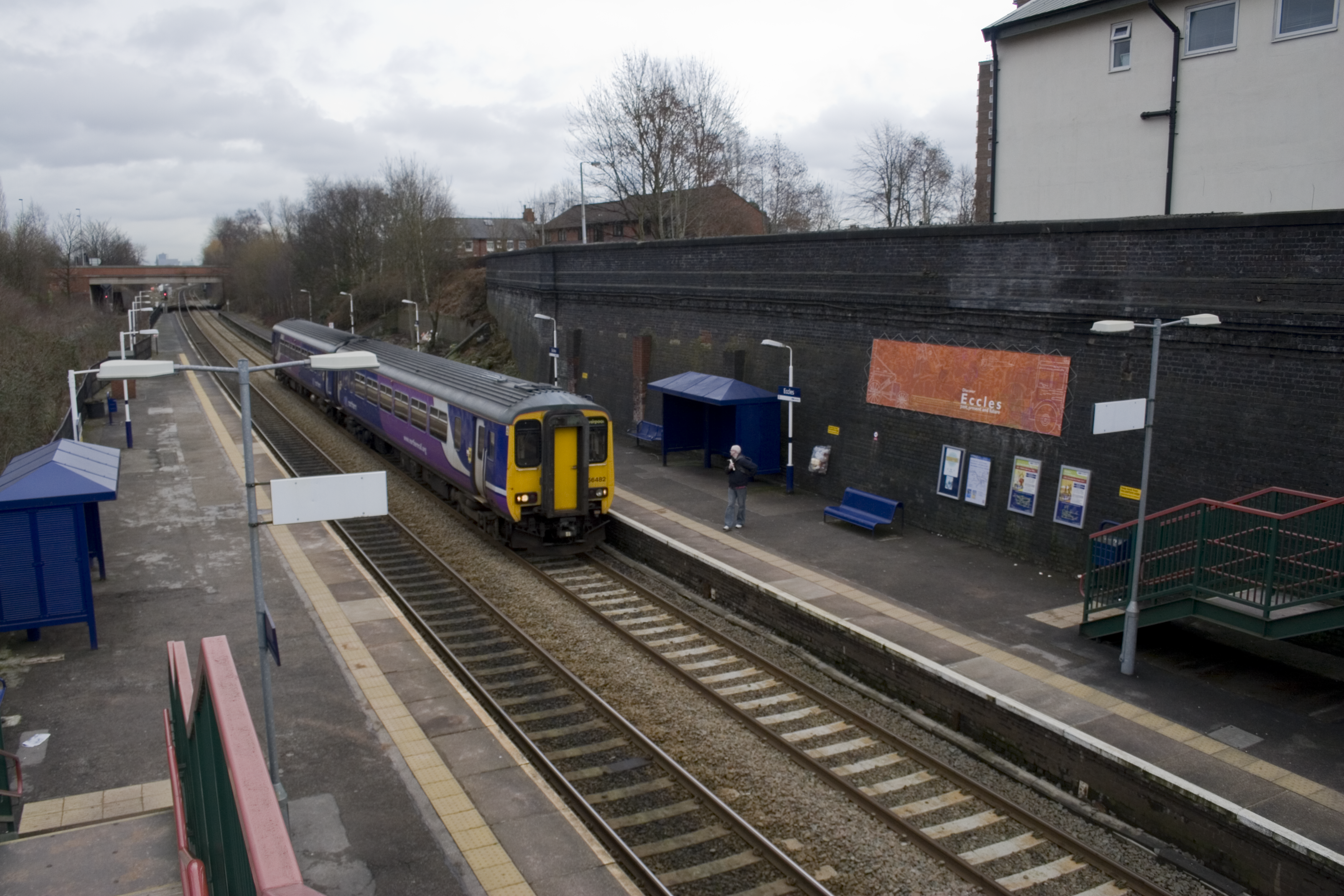
Eccles railway station

The opening of the Liverpool and Manchester Railway on 15 September 1830 was a pivotal moment in transport history. The world's first railway constructed to carry passengers as well as freight, it signalled the beginning of the end for both the turnpike trusts and the canal system. Stagecoach services ceased as passengers started to use the faster railway. The opening day was historic for more than one reason though; Eccles became a part of an early railway accident. During a stop at Parkside railway station near Newton-le-Willows, Member of Parliament for Liverpool, William Huskisson was seriously injured by an approaching locomotive. He was taken to the vicarage in Eccles for treatment, but died of his injuries. There have been two further serious railway incidents in Eccles, the first in 1941, and the second in 1984. The line was widened in 1882, and improvements were made to the station infrastructure, however on 11 January 1971 a fire destroyed the wooden station building, which has never been rebuilt.

The Tyldesley Loopline was opened by the London and North Western Railway on 1 September 1864 with stations at Monton Green (opened 1887), Worsley, Tyldesley and Leigh. The railway provided a link between Eccles (located on the existing Liverpool and Manchester line) and Wigan. In 1870 an additional branch line from this, the Roe Green Loopline, was opened to Bolton to support the surrounding collieries, the largest of which was at Mosley Common. The London and North Western Railway also built a line from Patricroft railway station to Molyneux Junction, via Clifton Hall Tunnel (built in 1849). The line connected with the East Lancashire Railway to Radcliffe and Bury. Clifton Hall Tunnel collapsed on 28 April 1953. The Tyldesley Loopline was closed on 5 May 1969 under the Beeching axe, and the closure of the Roe Green branch line followed in October 1969.

In 1851 the Earl of Ellesmere hosted a visit to Manchester by Queen Victoria and Prince Albert. They stayed at Worsley Hall, with a view of the canal, and were given a trip between Patricroft railway station and Worsley Hall, on state barges. Large crowds had gathered to cheer the royal party, which apparently frightened the horses drawing the barge so much that they fell into the canal.

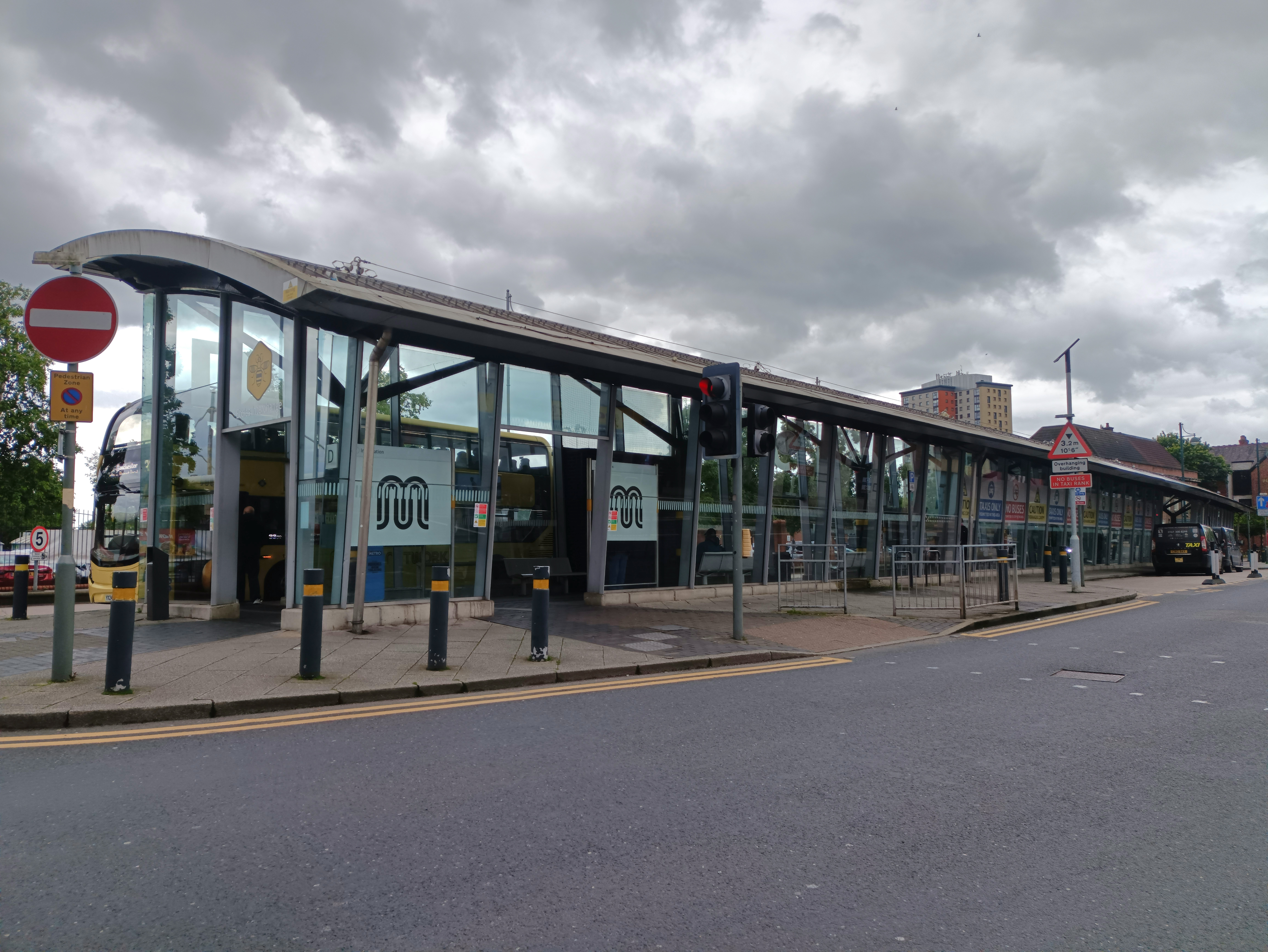
Eccles Interchange

The M602 motorway was opened throughout on 3 November 1971. The Borough Council had previously formed the Eccles Borough Council's General Purposes Committee, which from December 1962 began to purchase land for the route of the new road, while overseeing a powerful public relations scheme. A demolition programme commenced in January 1967, with some residents re-housed in newly built housing stock. The council also had to arrange for the purchase of land at the interchange with the present-day M60, and to re-route part of the Thirlmere Aqueduct. Construction began on 8 December 1969, along a route limited by the existence of housing estates, the Liverpool and Manchester Railway, the M62 junction at Worsley, and the Bridgewater Canal. Consideration was given to the route of the disused Eccles-Tyldesley-Wigan railway line; the height of the motorway was lowered to accommodate a new railway bridge in case the line was ever re-instated. The nearby bridge for the Clifton Junction branch railway was demolished with explosives.

In addition to the Liverpool and Manchester Railway, the town is now served by the Eccles Line of the Metrolink light rail system which, along with regular bus services, terminates at Eccles Interchange. Work on the Metrolink branch to Eccles began in July 1997 and was completed by July 2000, with the official opening ceremony in January 2001; trams leave every twelve minutes.

== Education ==
One of the early schools in Eccles was the 18th century day school in the parish of St. Mary's, south of the Irwell on the de Trafford estate. A Catholic Sunday school was opened in Eccles during the 19th century, in a building in Back Timothy Street (now the location of Eccles Library). Another day school was also opened in cottages on Barton Lane. The first substantial school in the area however was opened in 1851 along Church Street. A boys' school was opened in 1888.

St Patrick's RC High School is currently the best-performing secondary school in Salford, with one of the highest scores in England. The Eccles area contains a number of primary and secondary schools, including (but not limited to) St. Mary's R.C. Primary School, Branwood Preparatory School, New Park High School and Monton Green Primary School.

Eccles College is a further-education college. It opened in 1973 and provides a wide range of A-level and vocational course for school-leavers.

== Religion ==
As the population of Eccles increased during the Industrial Revolution the medieval parish of Eccles was gradually divided into smaller parishes, and surrounding townships gained their own churches. The Grade II* listed St Andrew's church in St Andrew's Parish was built in the 1870s and opened in 1879 (the tower was added in 1889). Over the next 40 years various decorative improvements were made to the building, including stone carvings, stained glass, and wall paintings (covered in 1965). Four months after the church was consecrated a church school was opened, the forerunner of the present St Andrew's Primary School. A second school in Monton (then part of the parish) opened in 1881. In 1912 Monton became a separate parish with its own church, St Paul's.

Roman Catholics living in Eccles originally attended worship at a chapel on the de Trafford estate, south of the Irwell, however the chapel was demolished and replaced by All Saints' Church. The first Rector of the Roman Catholic Parish of Eccles was, from 1879, a Father Sharrocks. The first public Roman Catholic procession in Eccles since the Reformation took place on 18 August 1889.

The area has a variety of other churches, including the Church of St James at nearby Hope, and a Baptist church. Other denominations catered for include Methodist New Connexion, Zion Methodist New Connexion, Wesleyan, and The Salvation Army (opened in 1881).

== Sport ==
The amateur rugby union club Eccles Rugby Football Club recorded their first fixture on 19 October 1878 against Leigh (now Leigh Leopards), going on to be winners of a cup competition organised by Swinton Lions on 4 January 1881 and were first recorded as members of the Lancashire County Rugby Football Union in 1886. Eccles RFC joined the RFU in 1887 but following the Northern Union schism in 1895, the club was re-established in 1897 and has maintained its existence since. Before the first world war Eccles played its rugby at Peel Green Road close to the Barton Swing Aqueduct, between the wars it played on the opposite bank of the Manchester Ship Canal at Redclyffe Road close to Barton Power Station, before moving to its current ground at Gorton Street in the summer of 1948.

The amateur rugby league club Salford City Roosters, formerly known as the Eccles Roosters, are also based in Eccles and were formed in 1977.

To the west of Eccles lies the 12,000 capacity City of Salford Stadium, home to both professional Rugby League team Salford Red Devils and professional Rugby Union team Sale Sharks along with new transport infrastructure and the Trafford Centre. Immediately west of the new stadium site is Boysnope Park Golf Club, an 18-hole par-72 parkland course with floodlit driving range.

Eccles is home to the City of Salford Volleyball Club, one of English volleyball's premier women's teams.

== Public services ==
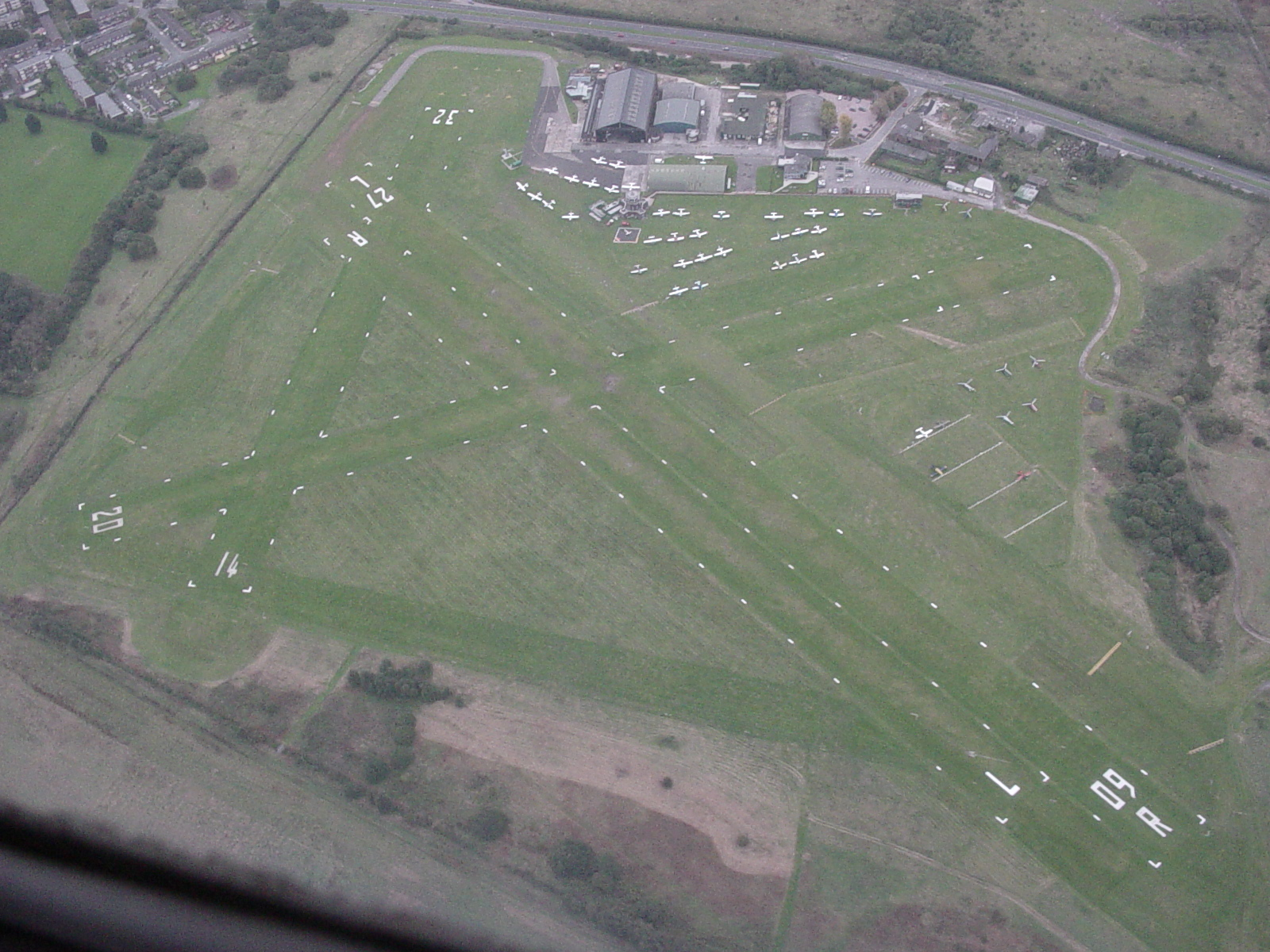
City Airport Manchester from overhead

Eccles became the first municipal corporation in England to operate a motorised fire engine in 1901. It was supplied to Eccles Corporation by a local firm, the Protector Lamp and Lighting Co., also known for manufacturing Miners' Safety Lamps. Barton Aerodrome, the first municipal aerodrome in the UK to be licensed by the Air Ministry, was opened on 29 January 1930 on a site at Barton-on-the-Moss.

The first Power Station in Eccles was built along Cawdor Street, and opened on 14 December 1896 by Alderman W. D. Kendall. The second and much larger Barton Power Station was built in 1920 alongside the Manchester Ship Canal and Bridgewater Canal. It was opened on 11 October 1923 by the Earl of Derby, and supplied electricity to Manchester and the South East Lancashire Electricity District. It ceased generation in March 1974, operating from thereon only as a switching station, and was demolished in June 1979.

Salford Royal hospital opened in 1882 as the Salford Union Infirmary, a hospital for sick paupers, in association with the union workhouse. It was later renamed as Hope Hospital, taking the name of the nearby medieval Hope Hall, demolished in 1956. The hospital was given its current name in 2007.

== Notable people ==
Edward Potts (1839–1909) was a renowned architect born in Bury. He moved to Oldham and designed many of the town's mills and was ranked with Philip Sidney Stott as the greatest mill architect of Victorian Lancashire. He moved to Eccles in 1891 and was responsible for the design of the town's library. He was a Liberal member of the borough council from 1902 to 1905, the first chairman of the town's library committee (1904), and a Justice of the Peace in 1906. He inaugurated popular Saturday-night concerts during the winter months and, keen to reduce the incidence of infant mortality, gave a sovereign to the mother of every child who reached the age of one. He died in 1909 and was buried at Chadderton Cemetery.

and

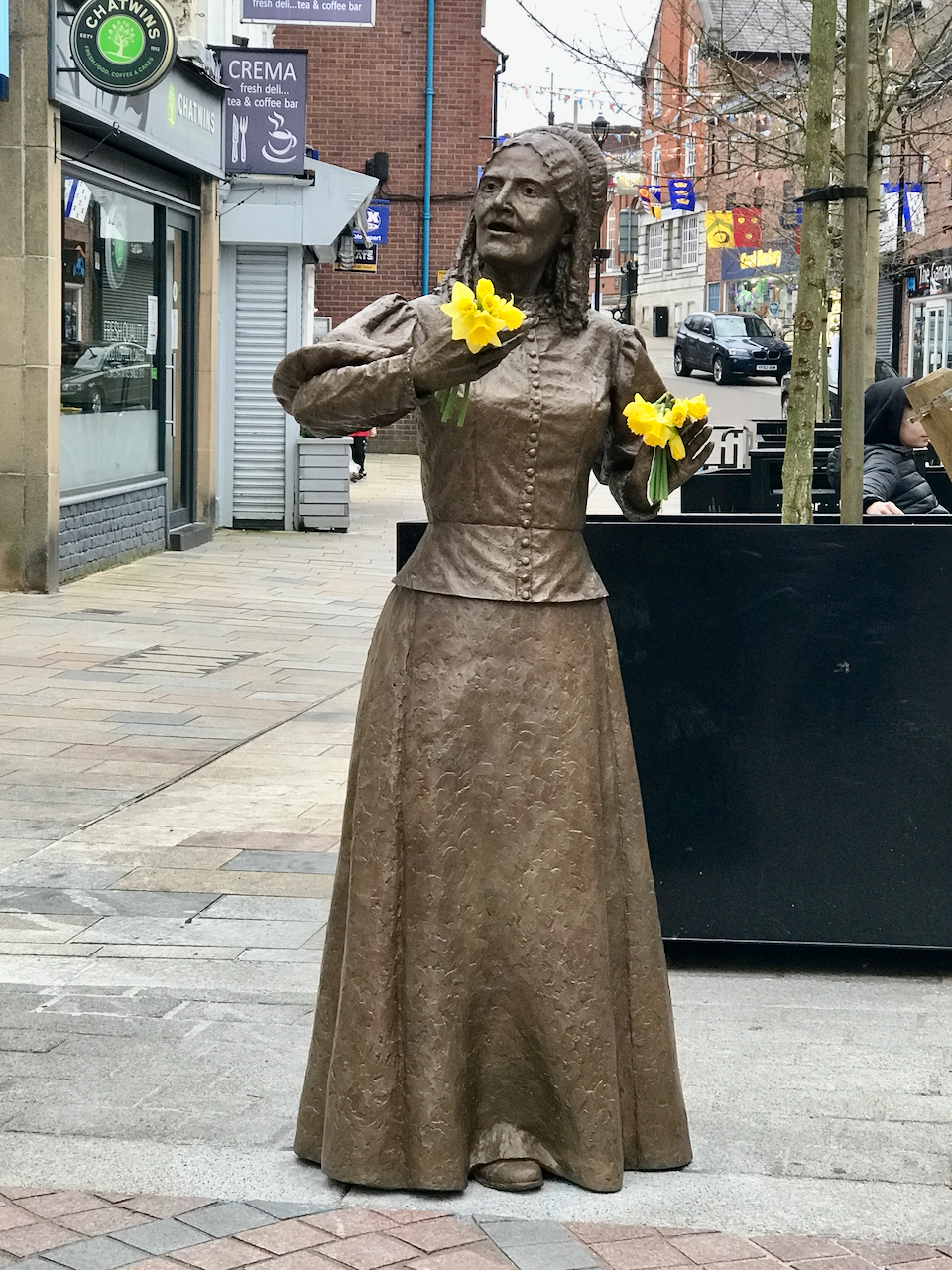
Elizabeth Clarke Wolstenholme-Elmy, our Elizabeth statue

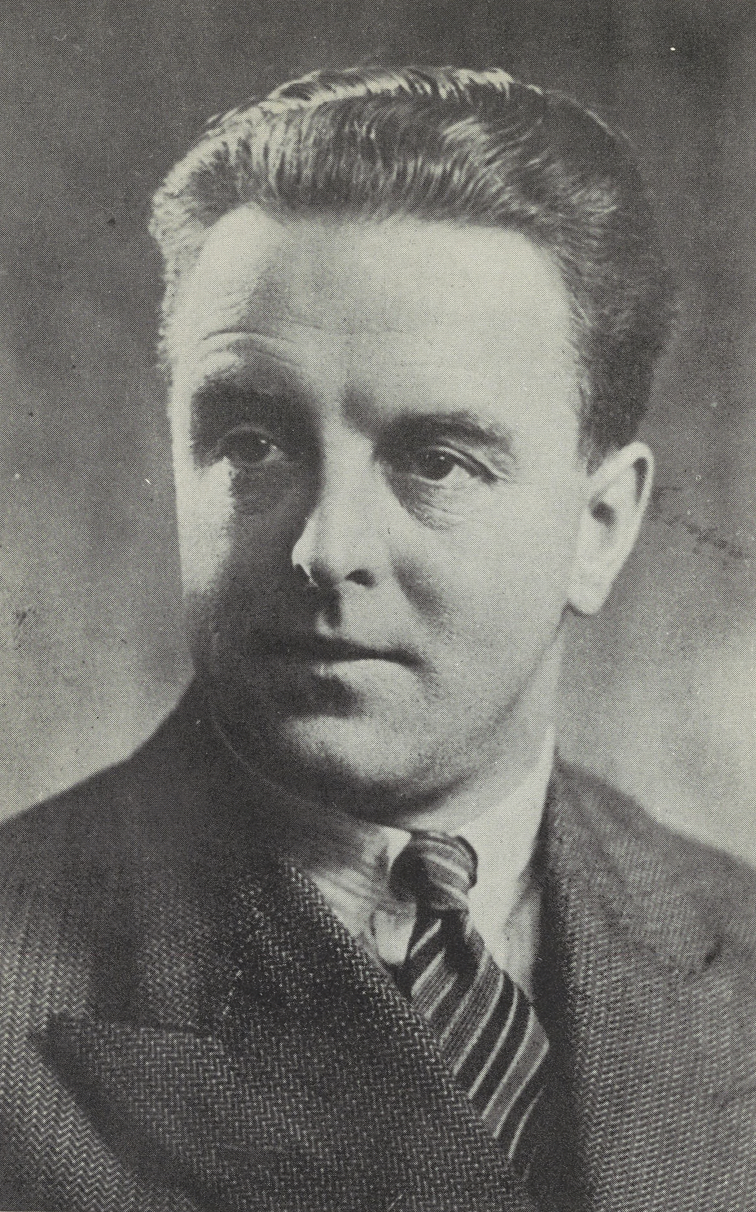
Sir John Moores, 1940

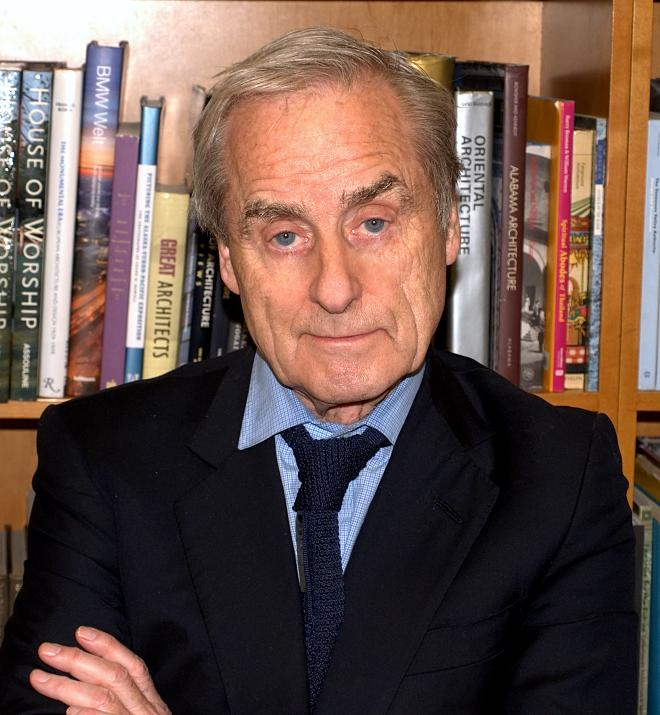
Sir Harold Evans, 2009

- William Booth (c. 1388–1464), Bishop of Coventry and Lichfield and Archbishop of York, 1452 to 1464.
- Rev. John Hewett (1614–1658), chaplain to Charles I, later executed for treason as a Royalist.
- Robert Ainsworth (1660–1743), an English Latin lexicographer, schoolmaster and author.
- John Baird (1799–1861), a Scottish divine.
- Sir Edward Clive Bayley (1821–1884), an Anglo-Indian civil servant, statesman and archaeologist.
- William Cooke (1821–1894), a Church of England clergyman and hymnwriter.
- Captain Cecil Buckley (1828–1872), Royal Navy officer, recipient of the Victoria Cross
- Joseph Wolstenholme (1829–1891), mathematician, wrote Wolstenholme number & two more.
- Joseph Malone (1833–1883), British Army captain, recipient of the Victoria Cross
- Elizabeth Clarke Wolstenholme-Elmy (1833–1918), teacher and campaigner for women's suffrage in the UK.
- Sir Alliott Verdon Roe (1877–1958), pioneer English pilot, founder Avro in 1910
- Harold Brighouse (1882–1958), playwright and author, wrote Hobson's Choice.
- Randolph Schwabe (1885–1948), painter and etcher; the Slade Professor of Fine Art at University College London, 1930 to 1948.
- Nellie Hall (c. 1893–1976), suffragette, arrested and imprisoned for supporting the Women's Social and Political Union (WSPU).
- Sir John Moores (1896–1993), businessman, football club owner, politician and philanthropist, owned Littlewoods
- Eric Birley (1906–1995), historian and archaeologist, excavated Vindolanda and the other forts at Hadrian's Wall
- Jill Summers (1910–1997), actress and comedian, played Phyllis Pearce, in Granada's Coronation Street.
- Jack McCann (1910–1972), politician, MP for Rochdale, 1958-1972.
- Sir Harold Evans (1928–2020), journalist and writer, editor of The Sunday Times from 1967 to 1981
- John Milne (1931–1978), abstract sculptor, prominent member of the St Ives School of artists
- Tony Warren (1936–2016), TV screenwriter and actor, created the ITV soap opera Coronation Street.
- Andrew Bennett (1939–2024), politician and MP for Stockport North, 1974 to 1983, and for Denton and Reddish, 1983 to 2005.
- Alan Henning (1967–2014), a humanitarian aid worker in Syria, murdered by Jihadi John of the Islamic State.
- Samia Longchambon (born 1982), actress, played Maria Connor in the ITV soap opera Coronation Street
- Kieron Richardson (born 1986), actor and TV presenter, plays the role of Ste Hay in Hollyoaks
- Chelsee Healey (born 1988), actress, portrayed Janeece Bryant in the BBC drama series Waterloo Road
- Isabel Hodgins (born 1993), actress, portrayed Victoria Sugden in the ITV soap opera Emmerdale.

Sport

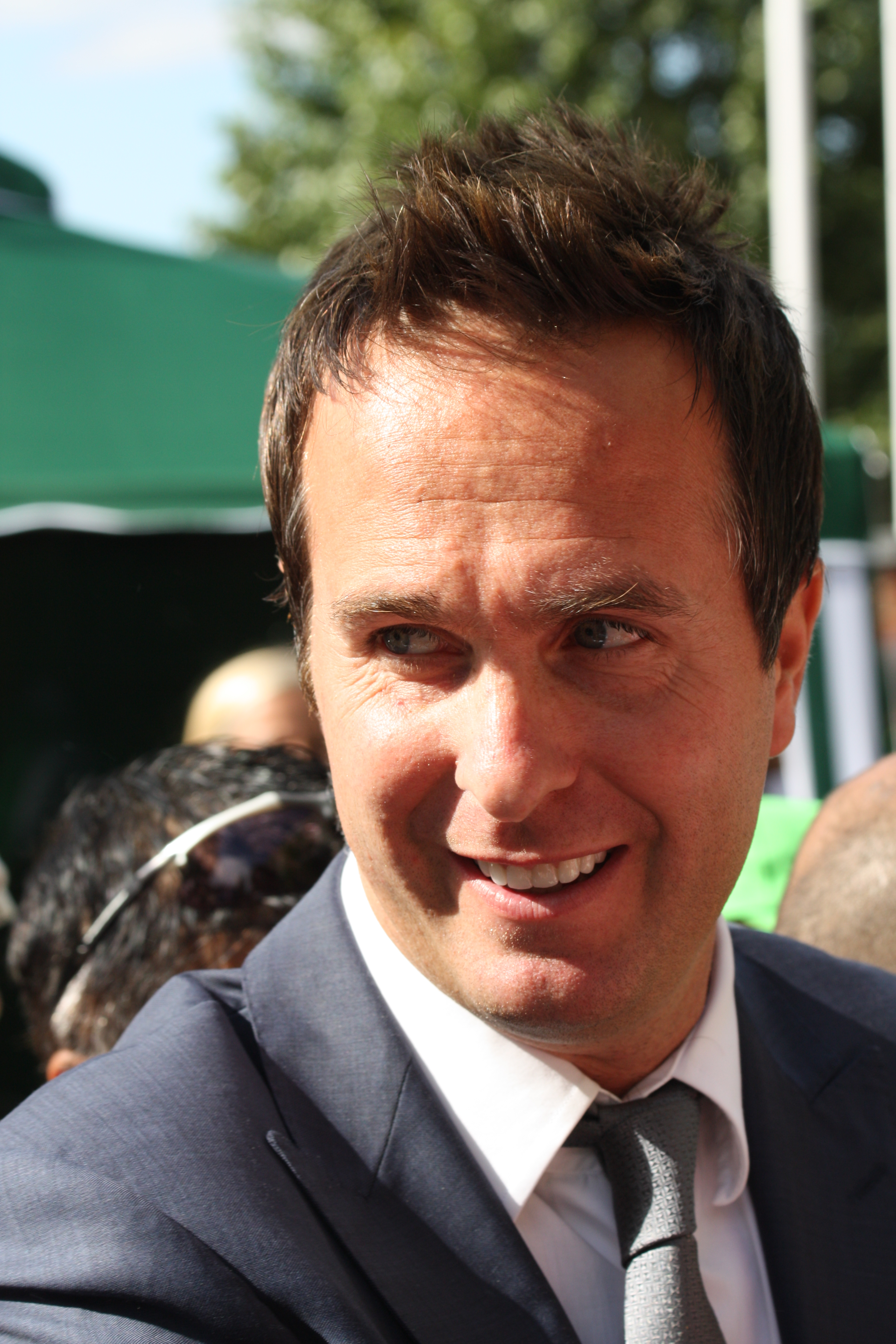
Michael Vaughan, 2010

- Walter Bumby (1860–1936), rugby union footballer who played 333 games for Swinton Lions
- George Alexander (1886–1929), lacrosse player, team silver medallist at the 1908 Summer Olympics.
- Norman Bullock (1900–1970), footballer, who played 506 games for Bury
- Chris Brockbank (ca.1901–1963), rugby league footballer who played 273 games for Swinton Lions
- Bev Wilson (1924–1987), footballer who played 405 games including 307 for Barrow
- Eric Skeels (born 1939), footballer who played 507 games for Stoke City
- Frank Haydock (born 1940), footballer who played over 360 games including 172 for Fleetwood Town
- John Shuker (1942–2019), footballer who played 478 games for Oxford United
- Michael Vaughan (born 1974), cricket commentator and former cricketer who played 268 First-class games and 82 Test matches
- Danny Simpson (born 1987), footballer who played 371 games including 113 at Leicester City

== Culture ==
Eccles is perhaps best known for the Eccles cake. Dating from the 18th century, they were first sold from a shop owned by James Birch in 1793. Traditionally made in the town from a recipe of flaky pastry, butter, nutmeg, candied peel, sugar and currants, they are sold across the country and exported across the world. They are sometimes referred to as "dead fly pies".

Eccles Wakes (a holiday to celebrate the dedication of the Parish Church) were celebrated annually until 1877, when the tradition was abolished by the Home Secretary. The Wakes were held over three days, beginning on the first Sunday after 25 August.

== See also ==
- Listed buildings in Eccles, Greater Manchester
- Peel Green
