= Langworthy, Salford =

Coordinates: 53.48559°N 2.2948°W

Langworthy
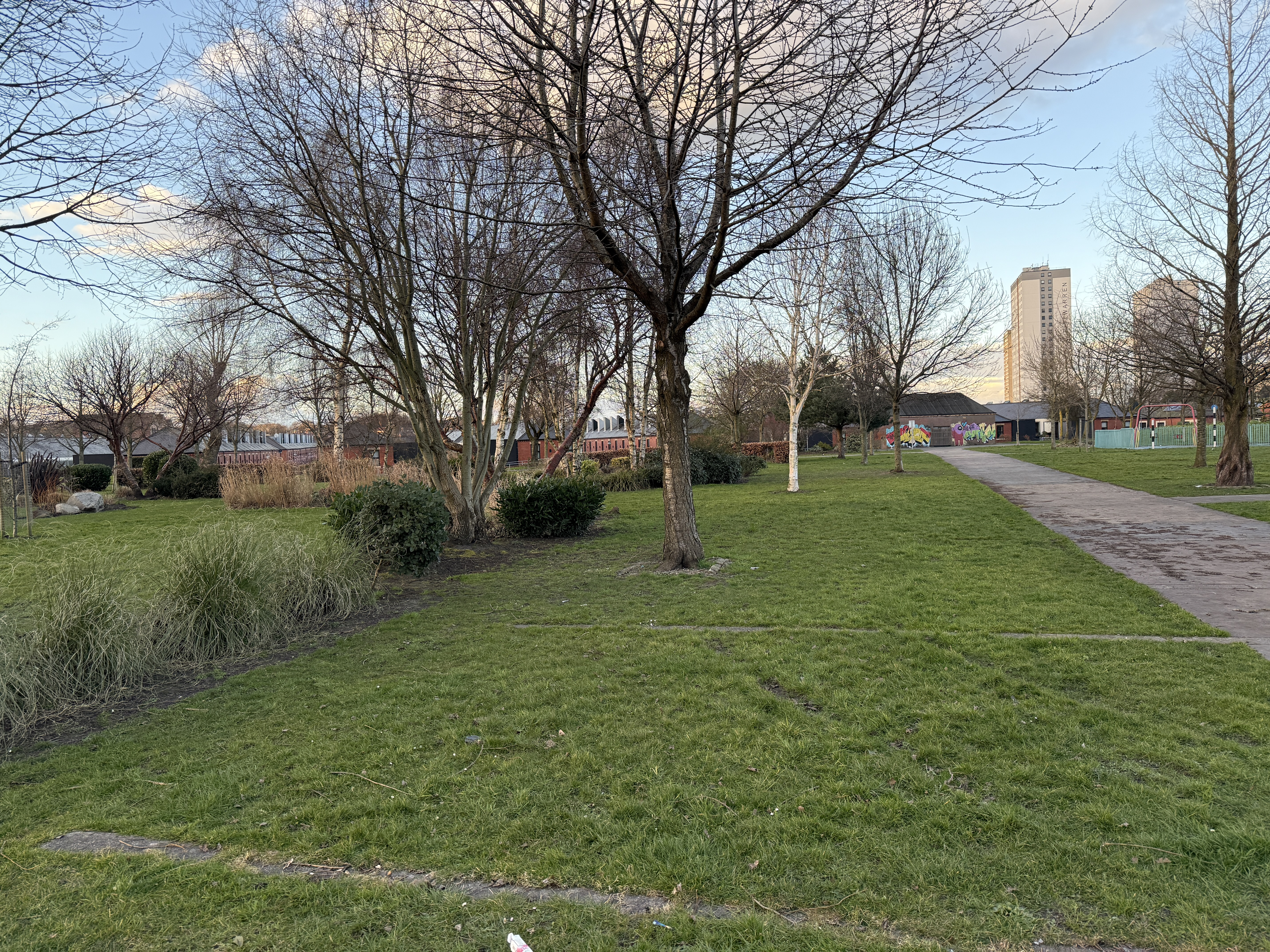
- Langworthy Park (also known as Chimney Pot Park) in Langworthy, Salford, United Kingdom in March 2025

- Location within Greater Manchester
- Population: 12,935 (2011.Ward)
  - Density: 51.5
- Metropolitan borough: Salford
- Metropolitan county: Greater Manchester
- Region: North West
- Country: England
- Sovereign state: United Kingdom
- Post town: SALFORD
- Postcode district: M6
- Dialling code: 0161
- Police: Greater Manchester
- Fire: Greater Manchester
- Ambulance: North West
- UK Parliament: Salford

Langworthy is an area of Salford, Greater Manchester. Weaste lies to the west of Langworthy and Pendleton to the east. In 2001 the population of Langworthy was 7,104, increasing to 12,935 at the 2011 Census. It was named after Edward Ryley Langworthy, a former mayor of Salford.

== Governance ==
Pendleton was part of the County Borough of Salford, and in 1974 became part of the metropolitan borough of the City of Salford, and metropolitan county of Greater Manchester.

The electoral ward of Langworthy is represented in Westminster by Rebecca Long-Bailey MP for Salford.

The ward is represented on Salford City Council by three Labour councillors: Michele Barnes, Wilson Nkurunziza, and John Warmisham.

== Regeneration ==
In common with other areas of urban Salford, Langworthy experienced long-term population decline in the 1990s with high levels of crime and poverty in the area. Langworthy is now part of a Housing Market Renewal Initiative scheme which also covers Seedley. Urban Splash have redeveloped several Victorian terrace streets as the "Chimney Pot Park" housing scheme which includes some social housing through Great Places Housing Group.

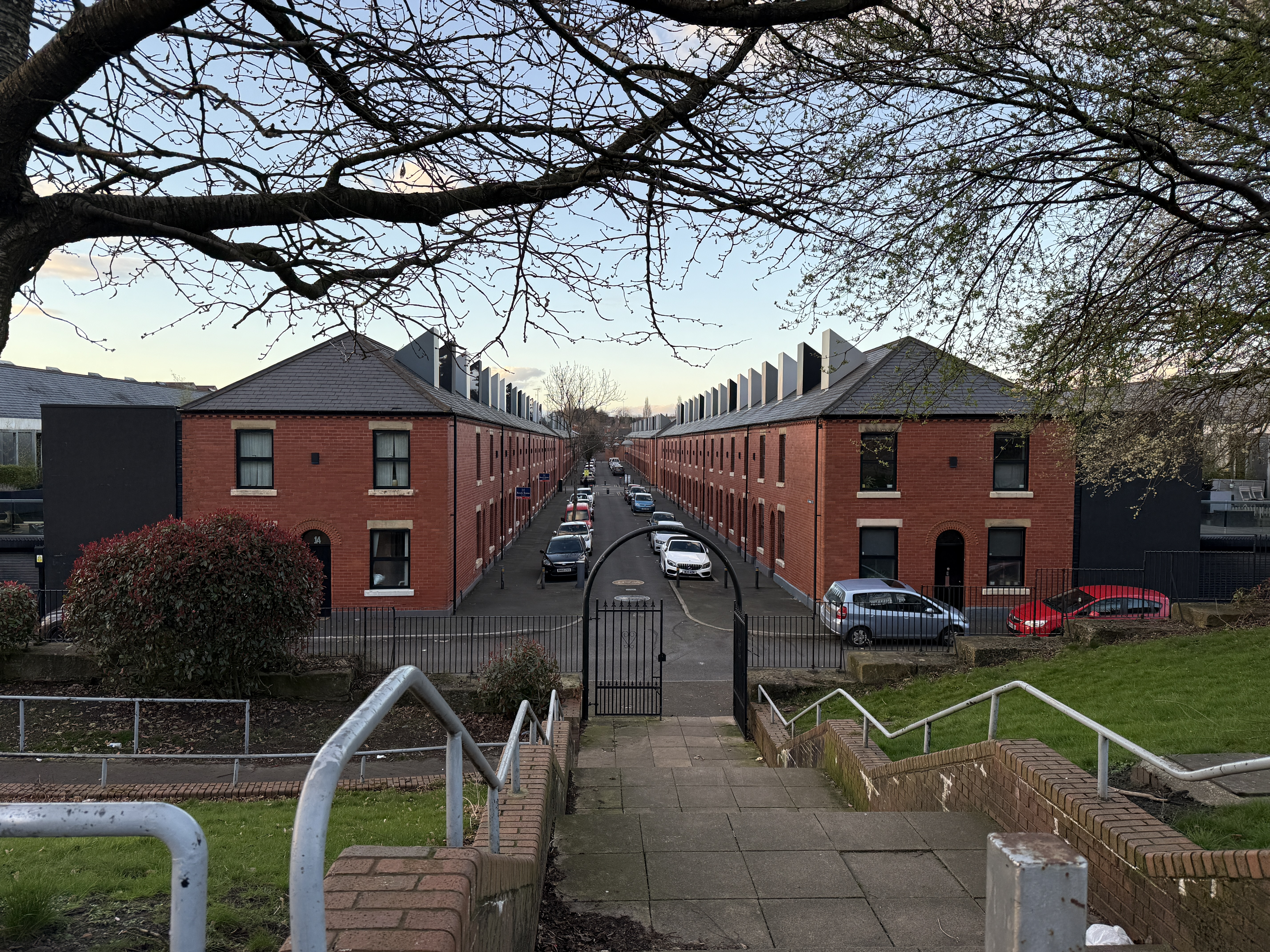
Some houses within the Chimney Pot Park residential development in Langworthy, Salford, United Kingdom in March 2025

== Education ==
The area is served by two primary schools; Willow Tree and Holy Family RC, the latter being built on the former site of Langworthy Road Primary school. The nearest library is Pendleton Gateway.

== Amenities ==
The Langworthy Park, also known as Chimney Pot Park, is a park in Langworthy. It includes a football pitch and a play area.

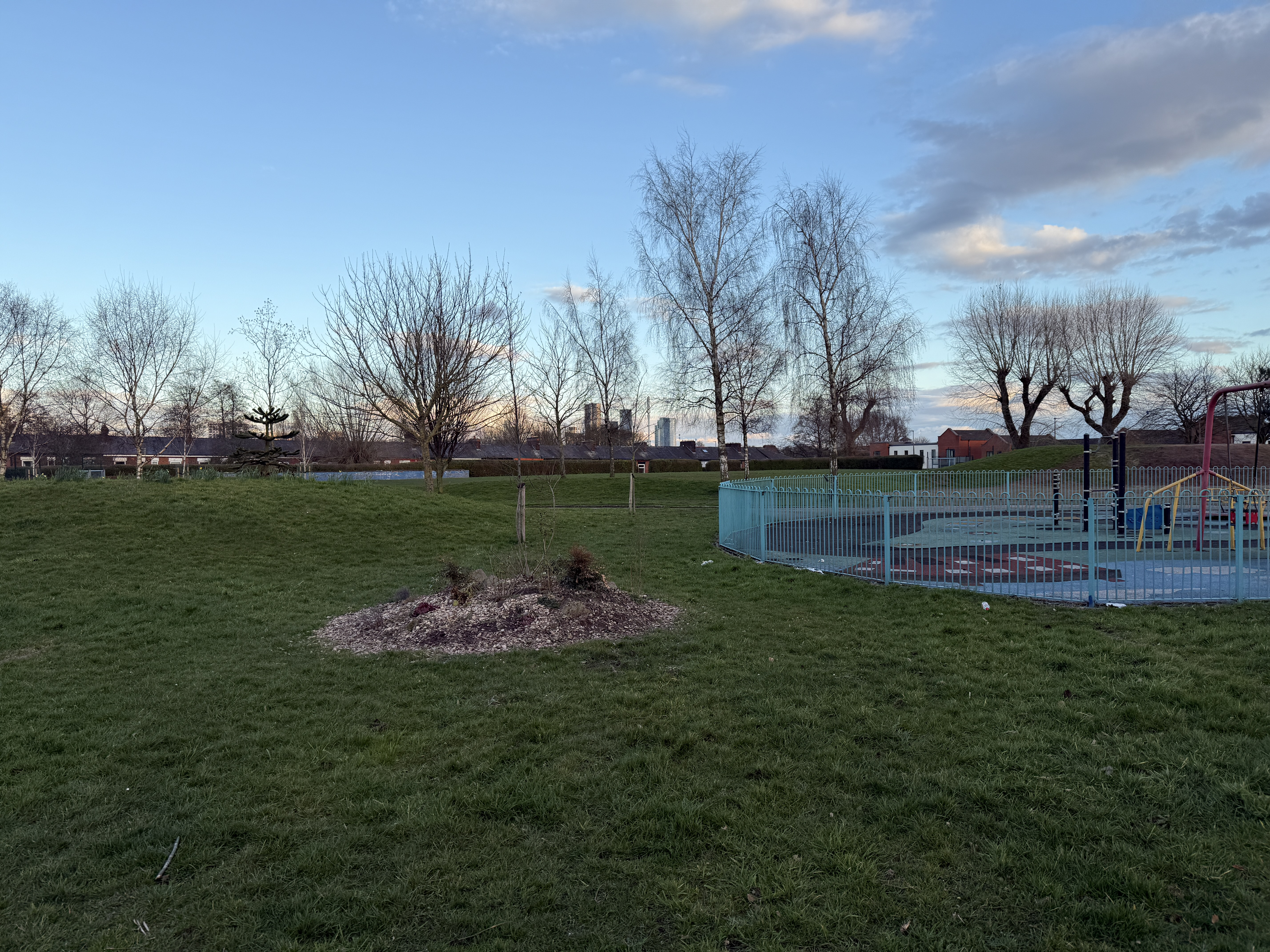
Langworthy Park in March 2025 showing part of the play area on the right

== Economy ==
Salford Shopping Centre is the nearest major shopping area at Pendleton. It is also a major bus interchange.

== Transport ==
The main road is Langworthy Road which runs north to the A6 road (Broad Street) and south to Eccles New Road and Salford Quays.

Langworthy is served by Langworthy tram stop on the Eccles line of the Metrolink system. Salford Crescent is the nearest mainline railway station.
