= Harry Williams (footballer, born 1929) =

English footballer (born 1929)

Personal information
- Full name: Henry George Williams
- Date of birth: 24 February 1929 (age 97)
- Place of birth: Salford, England
- Position: Inside forward

Senior career*
Years	Team	Apps	(Gls)
1949–1950	Manchester United	0	(0)
1950–1951	Witton Albion	?	(?)
1951–1952	West Ham United	5	(1)
1953–1954	Bury	2	(0)
1954–1955	Swindon Town	14	(7)
	Ryhl	?	(?)
Total		21	(8)
- * Club domestic league appearances and goals as of 13:52, 18 April 2011 (UTC)

Henry George Williams (born 24 February 1929) is an English former footballer who played as an inside forward in the Football League between 1951 and 1955. He made 21 appearances, mostly for his final league club, Swindon Town.
