= Langworthy tram stop =

Manchester Metrolink tram stop

Langworthy
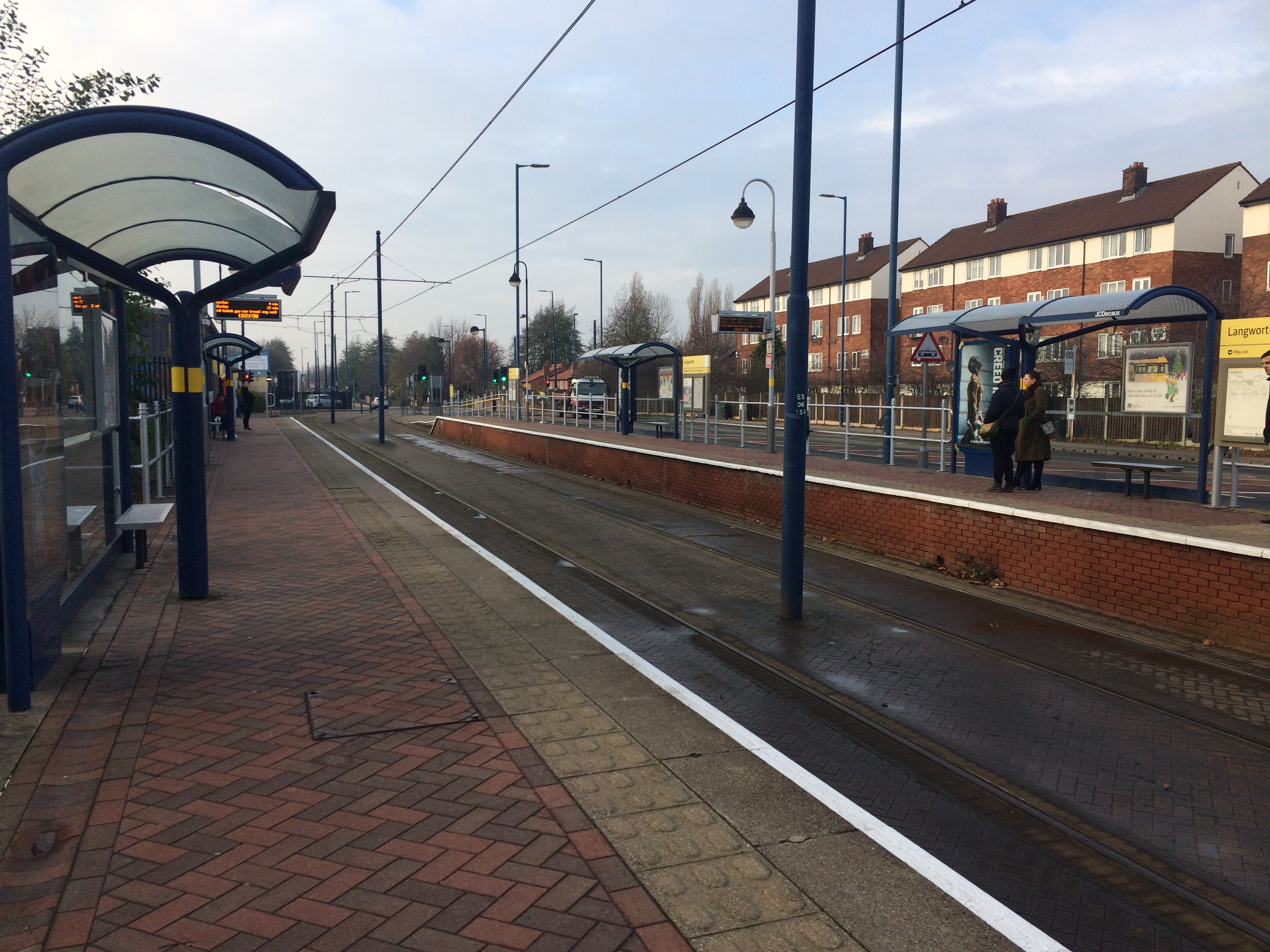
- Langworthy tram stop in November 2018.

General information
- Location: Langworthy, Salford; England
- Coordinates: 53.48064°N 2.29615°W
- Grid reference: SJ804982
- System: Metrolink station
- Line: Eccles Line
- Platforms: 2

Other information
- Status: In operation
- Fare zone: 2

History
- Opened: 21 July 2000
- Original company: Metrolink
Route map
Location

Langworthy is a tram stop on the Eccles Line of Greater Manchester's light rail Metrolink system. It opened to passengers on 21 July 2000, as part of Phase 2 of the network's expansion, in the Langworthy area of Salford, in North West England.

Langworthy Metrolink stop is located on the corner of Langworthy Road and Eccles New Road (the A57). The area to the south and west of the station is largely commercial and industrial. The area to the north along Langworthy Road mostly comprises terraced buildings. The area to the east of Langworthy Road is currently undergoing intensive redevelopment.

This stop lies within ticketing Zone 2.

== Services ==
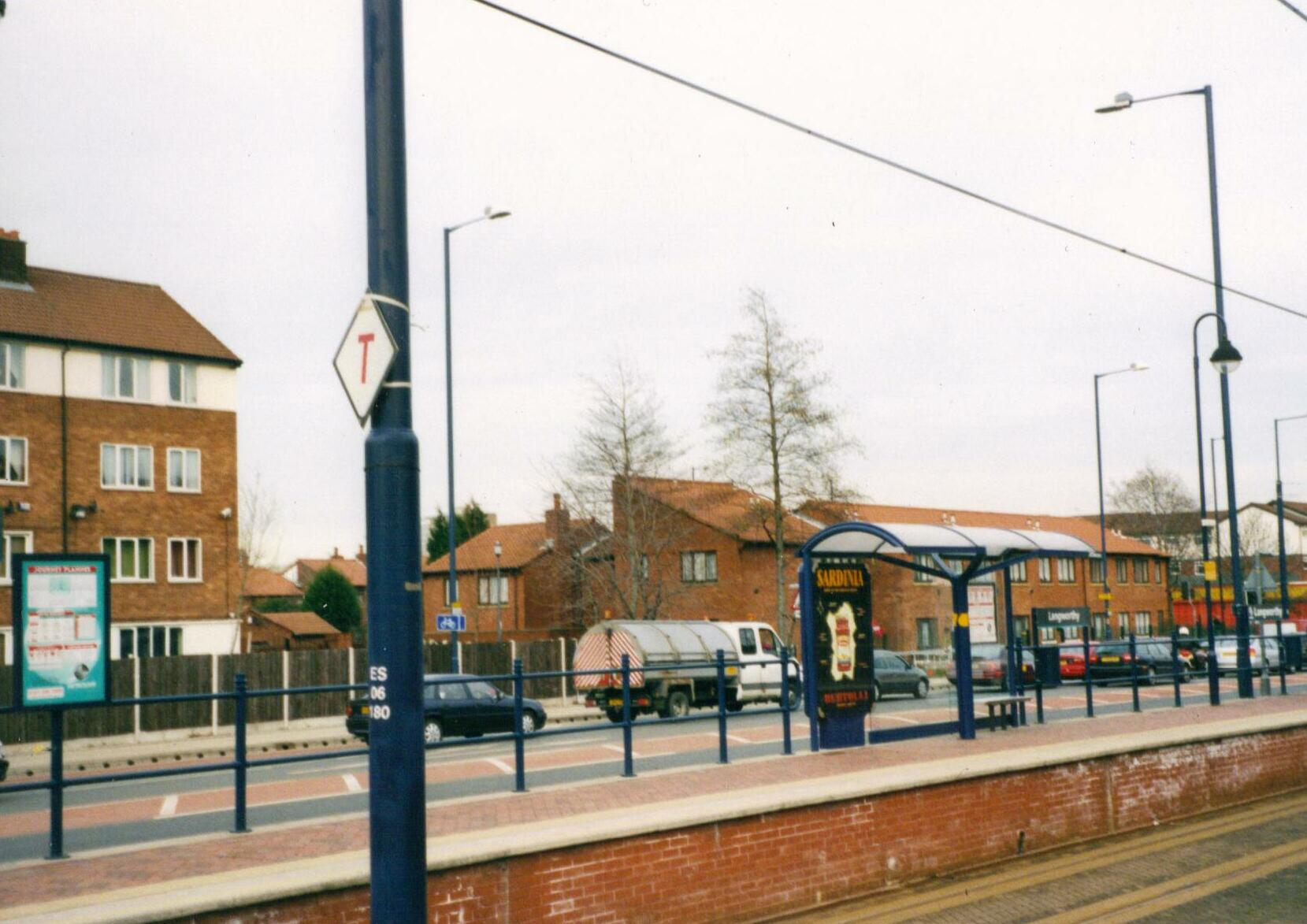
Langworthy tram stop in 2004

=== Service pattern ===
Preceding station	Manchester Metrolink	Following station
Weaste towards Eccles	Eccles–Ashton (peak only)	Broadway towards Ashton-under-Lyne
Weaste towards Eccles	Eccles–Ashton via MediaCityUK (off-peak only)	Broadway towards Ashton-under-Lyne

== Connecting bus routes ==
Langworthy station is served by Go North West service 33, which runs to Manchester and to Worsley via Eccles.

Also, stopping nearby is Stagecoach Manchester service 50, branded as City Connect linking Salford Shopping Centre in Pendleton, Salford Crescent railway station, Salford University, Salford Central railway station, Manchester and East Didsbury with Salford Quays and MediaCityUK.
