= Weaste tram stop =

Manchester Metrolink tram stop

Weaste
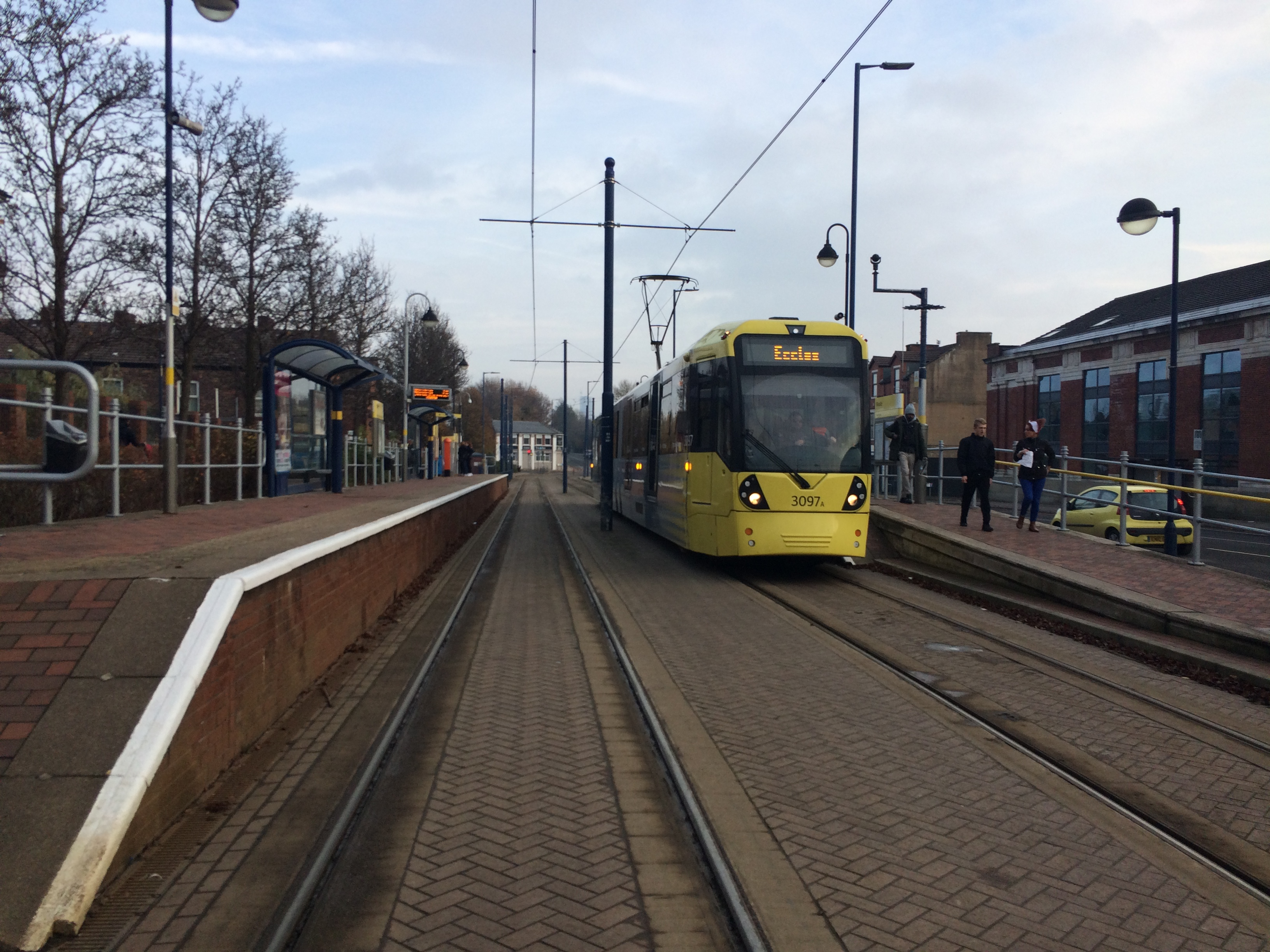
- An M5000 tram leaving Weaste stop in November 2018.

General information
- Location: Weaste, Salford; England
- Coordinates: 53.48242°N 2.30748°W
- Grid reference: SJ796984
- System: Metrolink station
- Line: Eccles Line
- Platforms: 2

Other information
- Status: In operation
- Fare zone: 2

History
- Opened: 21 July 2000
- Original company: Metrolink
Route map
Location

Weaste is a tram stop on the Eccles Line of Greater Manchester's light rail Metrolink system. It opened to passengers on 21 July 2000 as part of Phase 2 of the network's expansion, and is located the Weaste area of the City of Salford, in North West England.

Weaste tram stop is close to the M602 motorway and The Willows, the former home stadium of Salford City Reds.

This stop is located parallel to Eccles New Road (A57), between Foster Street and Weaste Road. The like named former railway station is also close by.

== Services ==
=== Service pattern ===
| Preceding station | Manchester Metrolink | Following station |
|---|---|---|
| Ladywell towards Eccles | Eccles–Ashton (peak only) | Langworthy towards Ashton-under-Lyne |
| Ladywell towards Eccles | Eccles–Ashton via MediaCityUK (off-peak only) | Langworthy towards Ashton-under-Lyne |

== Connecting bus routes ==
Weaste station is served by Go North West service 33, which runs between Manchester Shudehill and Worsley via Eccles
