= Ladywell tram stop =

Manchester Metrolink tram stop

Ladywell
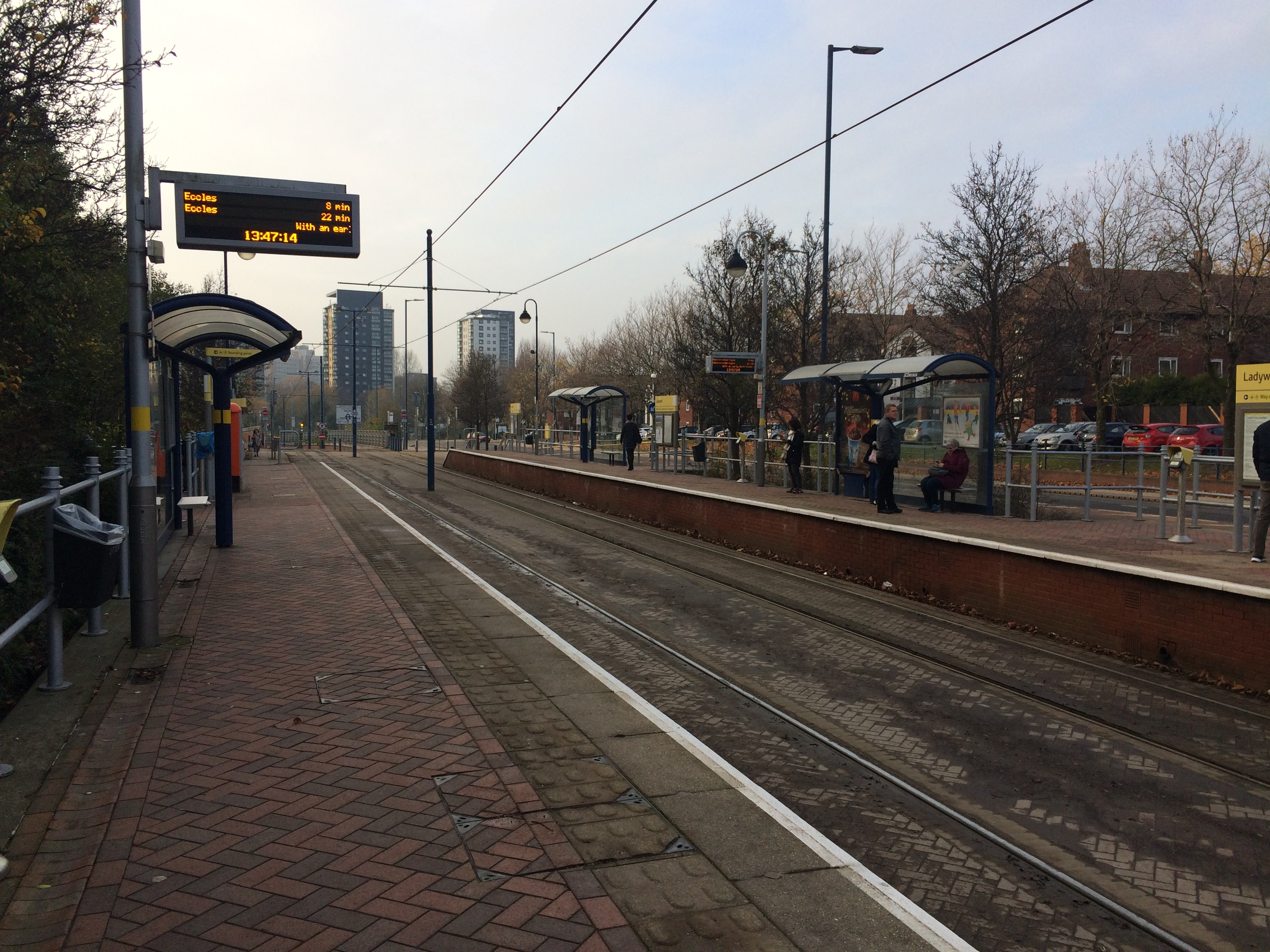
- Ladywell tram stop in November 2018, looking towards the 'dive' under Ladywell roundabout.

General information
- Location: Ladywell, City of Salford; England
- Coordinates: 53.48400°N 2.32672°W
- Grid reference: SJ783986
- System: Metrolink station
- Line: Eccles Line
- Platforms: 2

Other information
- Status: In operation
- Fare zone: 2

History
- Opened: 21 July 2000
- Original company: Manchester Metrolink
Route map
Location

Ladywell is a tram stop on the Eccles Line of Greater Manchester's light rail Metrolink system. It is located in the Weaste area of the City of Salford, in North West England, and opened on 21 July 2000 as part of Phase 2 of the system's expansion.

Ladywell has a Park and Ride car park for Metrolink customer which is a short walk from the end of the platforms.

The tram stop itself is named after the nearby roundabout, Ladywell Roundabout, under which the tram lines are tunnelled.

== Services ==
Preceding station	Manchester Metrolink	Following station
Eccles Terminus	Eccles–Ashton (peak only)	Weaste towards Ashton-under-Lyne
Eccles Terminus	Eccles–Ashton via MediaCityUK (off-peak only)	Weaste towards Ashton-under-Lyne

== Connecting bus routes ==
Ladywell station is served by Go North West service 33, which runs between Manchester Shudehill and Worsley via Eccles and Diamond Bus North West service 20 which operates between Bolton and The Trafford Centre via Monton, Worsley and Walkden.
