= City of Salford =

Borough and City in Greater Manchester, England

Salford
- City and metropolitan borough
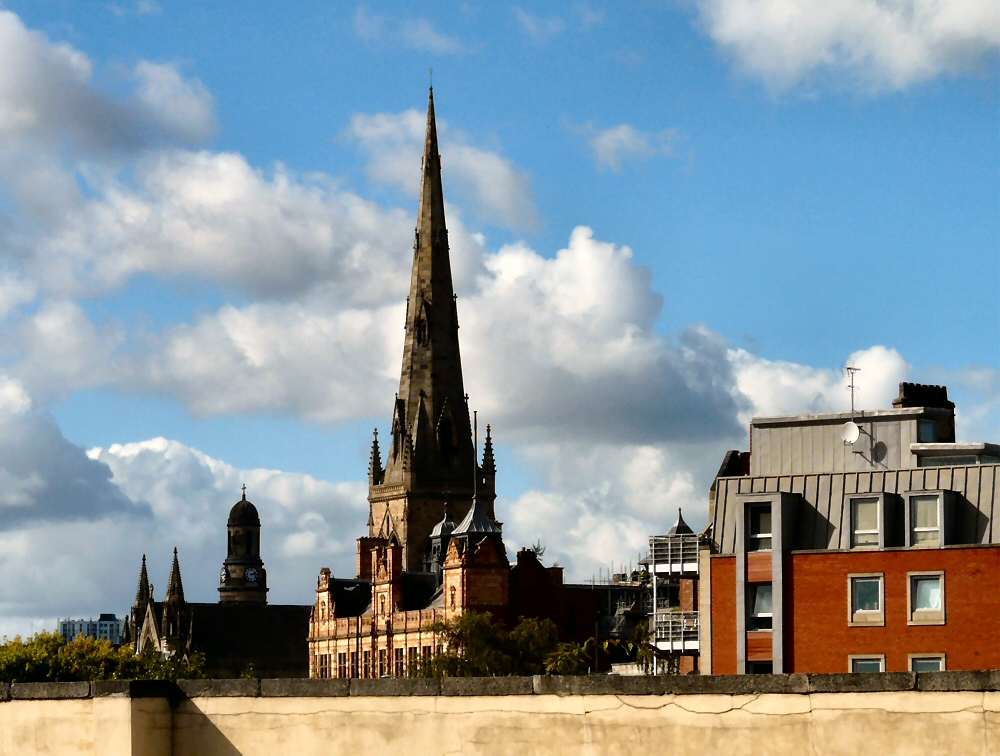
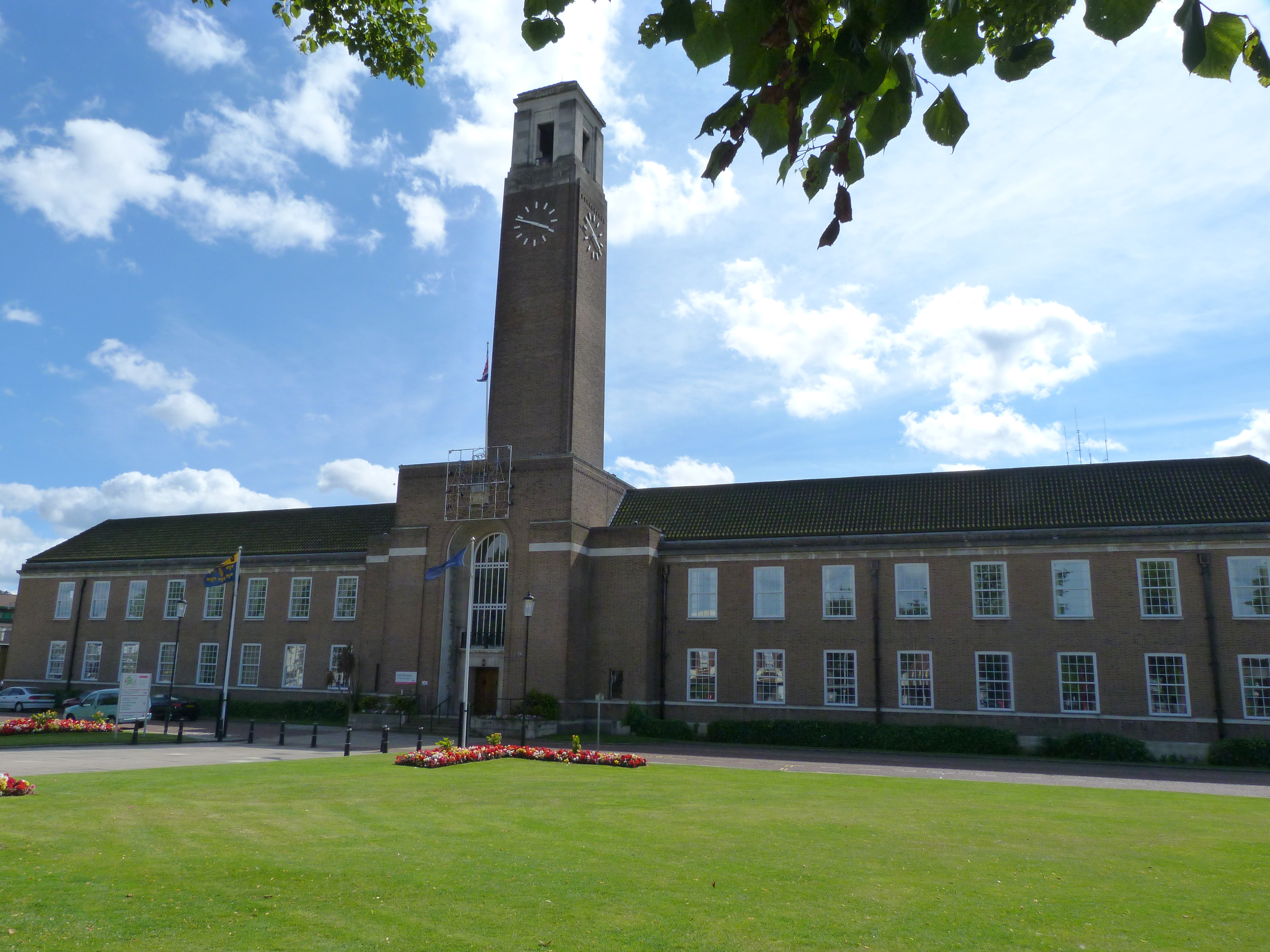
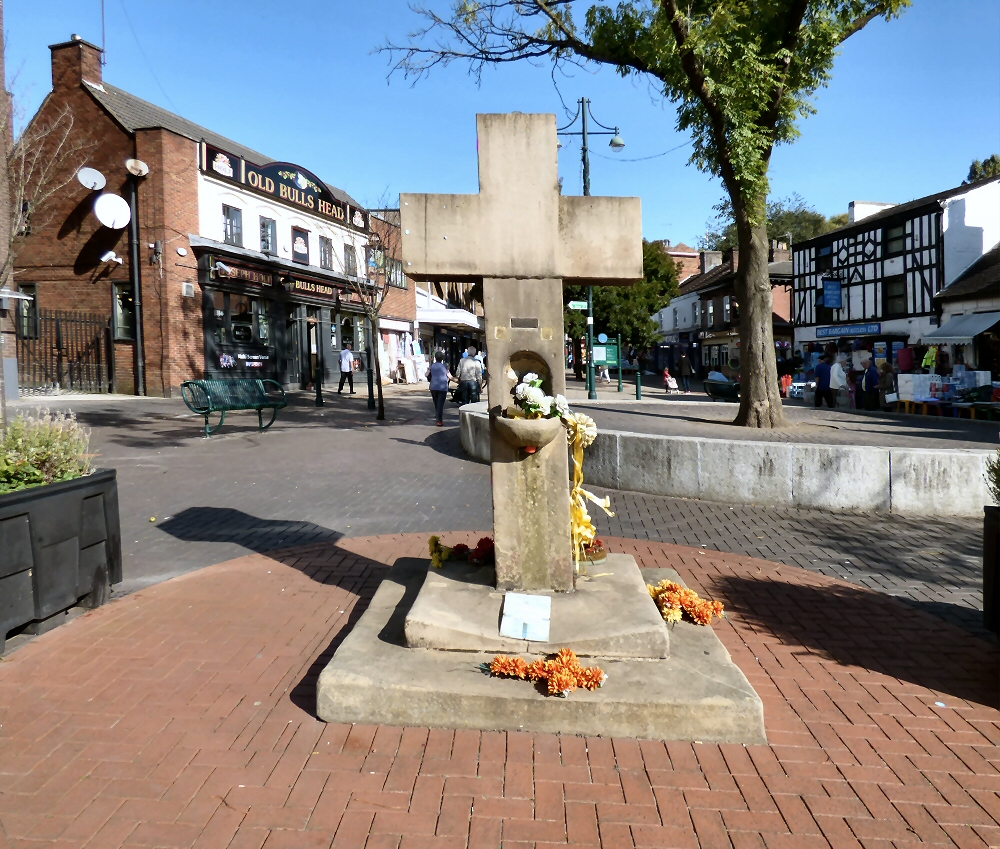
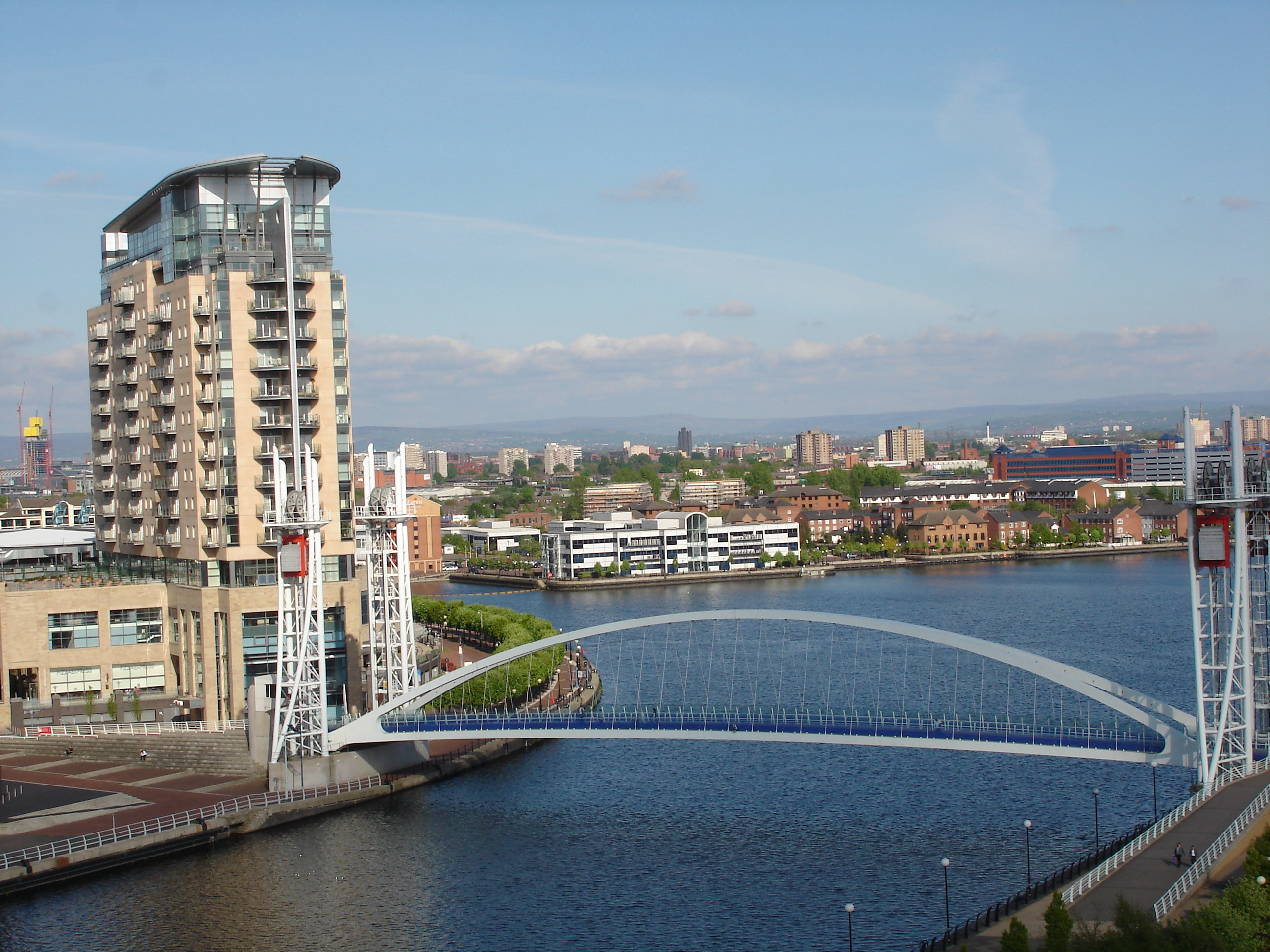
- Clockwise from the top; Salford and Salford Cathedral from Salford Central, Eccles Cross, Salford Quays near Manchester and Salford Civic Centre in Swinton

- Coat of arms
- Motto: Latin: Salus Populi Suprema Lex, lit. 'the welfare of the people is the highest law'
- Salford shown within Greater Manchester
- Coordinates: 53.4807°N 2.2950°W
- Sovereign state: United Kingdom
- Country: England
- Region: North West
- Ceremonial county and city region: Greater Manchester
- Incorporated: 1 April 1974
- Named for: Salford
- Administrative HQ: Salford Civic Centre
- Areas of the city (2011 census BUASD): List: Agecroft; Barton upon Irwell; Blackfriars; Boothstown; Broughton; Cadishead; City Centre; Eccles (Town); Greengate; Irlams o' th' Height; Kersal; Langworthy; Little Hulton; Linnyshaw; Monton; Ordsall; Patricroft; Peel Green; Pendlebury (Town); Pendleton; Salford Quays; Seedley; Swinton (Town); Walkden (Town); Wardley; Weaste; Winton; Worsley

Government
  - Type: Metropolitan borough
  - Body: Salford City Council
  - Executive: Mayor and cabinet
  - Control: Labour
  - Elected mayor: Paul Dennett (L)
  - Ceremonial mayor: Gina Reynolds
  - MPs: 3 MPs: Michael Wheeler (L); Rebecca Long-Bailey (L); Graham Stringer (L)

Area
  - Total: 97 km^{2} (37 sq mi)
  - Rank: 201st

Population (2025)
  - Total: 297,004
  - Rank: 55th
  - Density: 3,056/km^{2} (7,920/sq mi)
- Demonym: Salfordian

Ethnicity (2021)
  - Ethnic groups: List: 82.3% White; 6.1% Black; 5.5% Asian; 3.1% Mixed; 2.9% other

Religion (2021)
  - Religion: List: 47.7% Christianity; 35.6% no religion; 5.0% Islam; 3.8% Judaism; 0.8% Hinduism; 0.4% Buddhism; 0.3% Sikhism; 0.4% other; 6.0% not stated
- Time zone: UTC+0 (GMT)
  - Summer (DST): UTC+1 (BST)
- Postcode area: M
- Dialling code: 0161
- ISO 3166 code: GB-SLF
- GSS code: E08000006
- Website: salford.gov.uk

The City of Salford is a metropolitan borough with city status in Greater Manchester, England. The borough is named after its main settlement, Salford. The borough also includes Eccles, Swinton, Walkden and Pendlebury. The borough had a population of 297,004 in 2025, and is administered from the Salford Civic Centre in Swinton.

Salford is the historic centre of the Salford Hundred, an ancient subdivision of Lancashire. The City of Salford is the fifth-most populous district in Greater Manchester. The city's boundaries, set by the Local Government Act 1972, include five former local government districts. It is bounded on the southeast by the River Irwell, which forms part of its boundary with Manchester to the east, and by the Manchester Ship Canal to the south, which forms its boundary with Trafford. The metropolitan boroughs of Wigan, Bolton, and Bury lie to the west, northwest, and north respectively. Some parts of the city, which lies directly west of Manchester, are highly industrialised and densely populated, but around one-third of the city consists of rural open space. The western half of the city stretches across an ancient peat bog, Chat Moss.

Salford has a history of human activity stretching back to the Mesolithic age. There are over 250 listed buildings in the city, including Salford Cathedral, and three Scheduled Ancient Monuments. With the Industrial Revolution, Salford and its neighboring settlements grew alongside the textile industry. The former County Borough of Salford was granted city status in 1926 and thus making it the second city in Greater Manchester after neighbouring Manchester. The city and its industries experienced a decline throughout much of the 20th century. Since the 1990s, parts of Salford have undergone regeneration, especially Salford Quays, home of BBC North and Granada Television, and the area around the University of Salford.

Salford Red Devils are a professional rugby league club in Super League and Salford City F.C. is a professional football club in League Two.

== History ==
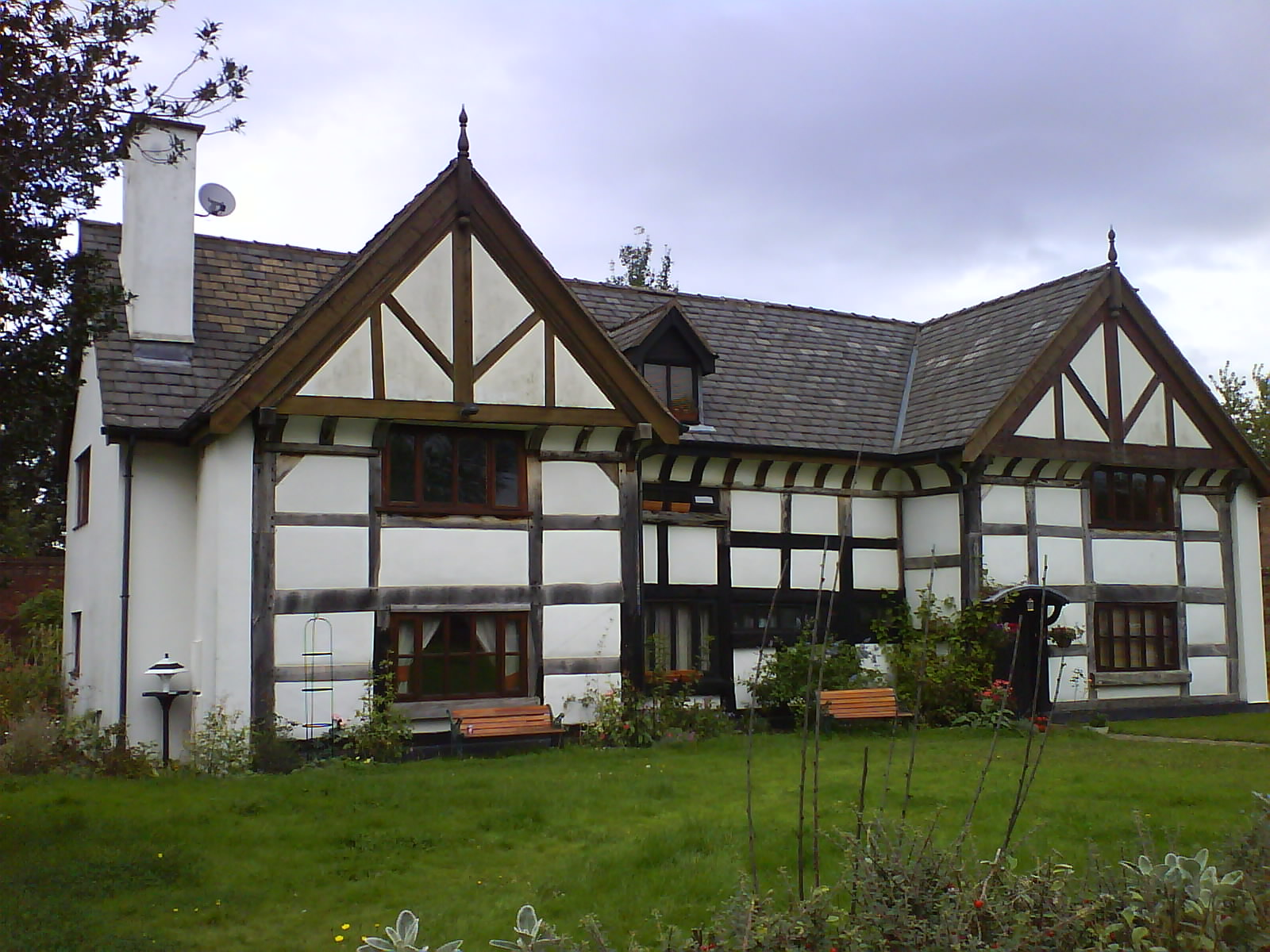
Kersal Cell, built in the 16th century, was a manor house built on the site of a Cluniac priory.

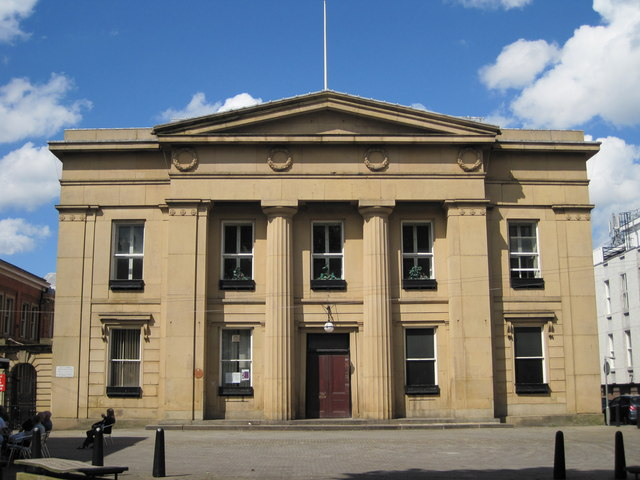
Former Salford Town Hall, Bexley Square

Although the metropolitan borough of the City of Salford was a 20th-century creation, the area has a long history of human activity, extending back to the Stone Age. Neolithic flint arrow-heads and tools, and evidence of Bronze Age activity has been discovered in Salford. The northerly section of Watling Street, a Roman road from Manchester (Mamucium) via Bury to Ribchester (Bremetennacum), passes through the city; a hoard of over 550 bronze Roman coins dating between 259 AD and 278 AD was discovered in Boothstown; and a Romano-British bog body, Worsley Man, was discovered in the Chat Moss peat bog.

In 1142, a monastic cell (small monastic house) dedicated to St. Leonard was established in Kersal. The 12th century hundred of Salford was created as Salfordshire in the historic county of Lancashire and survived until the 19th century, when it was replaced by one of the first county boroughs in the country. Salford became a free borough in about 1230, when it was granted a charter as a free borough by the Earl Ranulph of Chester. The cell in Kersal was sold in 1540 during the Dissolution of the Monasteries. A 16th-century manor house, called Kersal Cell, was built on the site of the priory. In the English Civil War between King Charles I and parliament, Salford was Royalist. Salford was also noted as Jacobite territory; its inhabitants supported Charles Edward Stuart's claim to the Kingdom of Great Britain and hosted him when he rode through the area during the Jacobite rising of 1745.

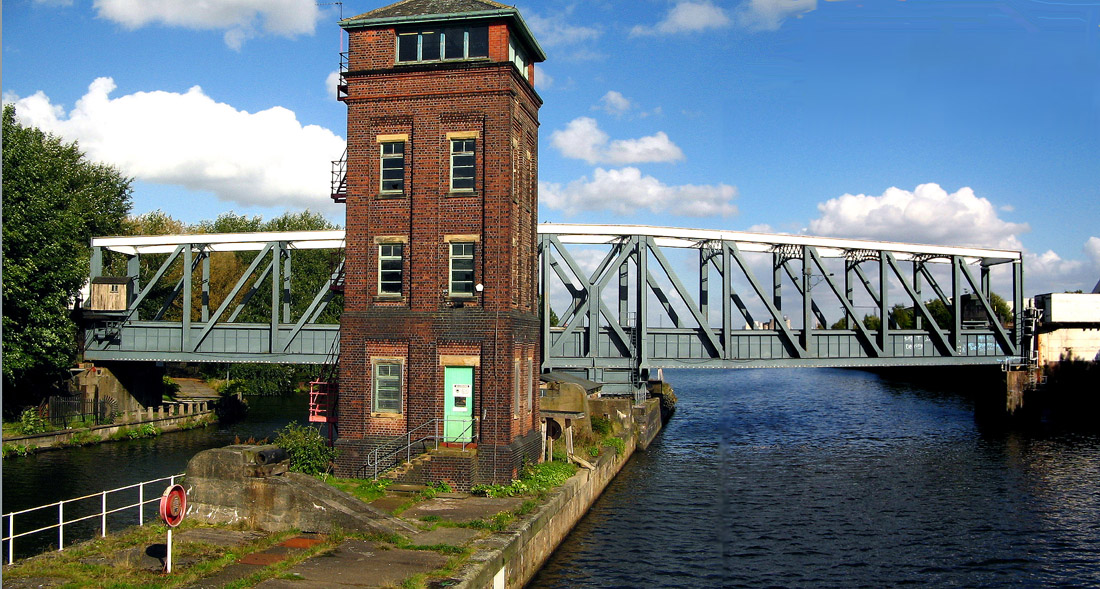
The Barton Swing Aqueduct in the closed position.

During the Industrial Revolution, Salford grew as a result of the textile industry. Although Salford experienced an increase in population, it was overshadowed by the dominance of Manchester and did not evolve as a commercial centre in the same way. On 15 September 1830, Eccles was site of the world's first railway accident. During a stop in Eccles to take on water, William Huskisson, Member of Parliament for Liverpool, had his leg crushed by Stephenson's Rocket; at the time he was in conversation with the Duke of Wellington, who was opening the railway, and did not get out of the way of the train in time. Although Huskisson was taken to Eccles for treatment he died of his injuries. The six-foot-tall Oglala Sioux tribesman, "Surrounded By the Enemy", died here from a bronchial infection at age twenty-two in 1887 during a tour of Buffalo Bill's Wild West Show and was buried at Brompton Cemetery. In 1894, the Manchester Ship Canal was opened, running from the River Mersey to Salford Quays; when it was complete it was the largest navigation canal in the world. Along the route of the canal, it was necessary to create an aqueduct carrying the Bridgewater Canal over the Ship Canal. The Barton Swing Aqueduct, designed by Sir Edward Leader Williams, is 100 metres (330 ft) long and weighs 1,450 metric tons (1,427 long tons; 1,598 short tons).

At the start of the 20th century, Salford began to decline due to competition from outside the UK. A survey in 1931 concluded that parts of Salford were amongst the worst slums in the country. Salford was granted city status in 1926. During World War II, Salford Docks were regularly bombed.

In the decades following the Second World War there was a significant economic and population decline in Salford. In 1961 a small part of Eccles was added to the city. On 1 April 1974, the City and County Borough of Salford was abolished under the Local Government Act 1972, and was replaced by the metropolitan borough of City of Salford, one of ten local government districts in the new metropolitan county of Greater Manchester. The city status of the new district was confirmed by additional letters patent issued on the same day. Since the early 1990s, the decline has slowed.

Prior to the metropolitan borough's creation, the name Salford for the new local government district courted controversy. Salford was "thought second-class by those in Eccles", who preferred the new name "Irwell" for the district (with reference to the River Irwell). A councillor for the then City and County Borough of Salford objected to this suggestion, stating this label was nothing but "a dirty stinking river". The name Irwell won 8 votes to Salford's 7, but a private protest and deliberation favoured Salford as the name for the new city, citing that the River Irwell would pass through two other Greater Manchester districts, and that it "doesn't touch Worsley".

== Geography ==
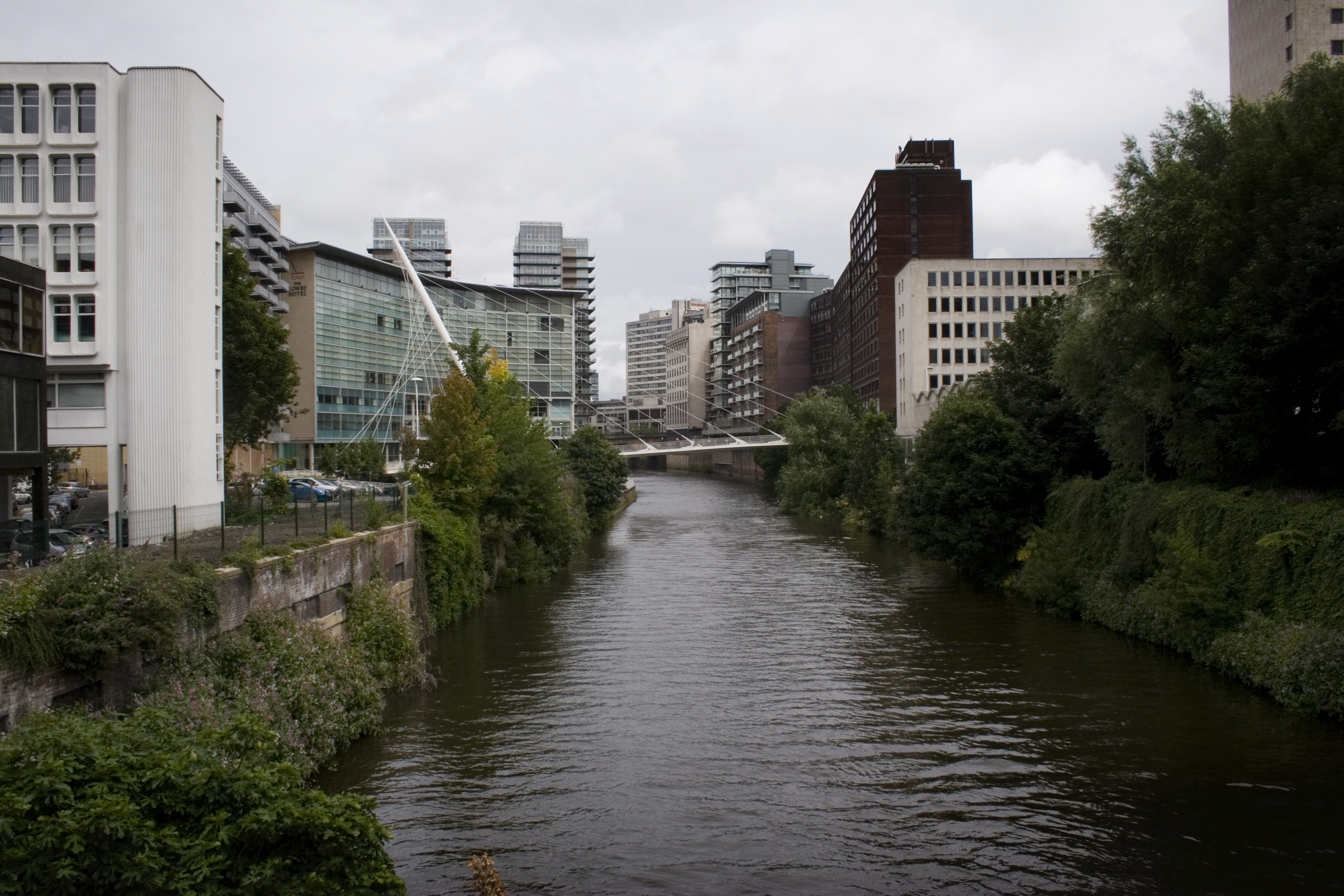
The River Irwell marks the border between Salford & Manchester

The City of Salford is bounded to the north by the Metropolitan Borough of Bolton and Metropolitan Borough of Bury; to the west by the Metropolitan Borough of Wigan; to the south by the Metropolitan Borough of Trafford; and to the east by Manchester, which lies directly across the River Irwell from Salford. The natural mossland of Chat Moss lies in the south-western corner of the city; it covers an area of about 10.6 square miles (27.5 km^{2}), accounting for about 30% of the city's area, and lies 75 feet (23 m) above sea level. The moss makes up the largest area of prime farmland in Greater Manchester. Kersal Moor is an area of moorland spanning 8 hectares (20 acres) in Kersal; it is a local nature reserve and a Site of Biological Importance. Greenspace accounts for 55.7% of the City of Salford's total area, domestic buildings and gardens comprise 20.0%, and the rest is made up of roads and non-domestic buildings.

To the south of Salford are the docks of Salford Quays, now home to the MediaCityUK. MediaCityUK is a large area that crosses the boundary into Trafford Park, Trafford. Although Salford Quays is in the City of Salford and has created job opportunities and more housing since the 2010s when it was built.

The River Irwell runs south east through Kearsley, Clifton and Agecroft then meanders around Lower Broughton and Kersal, Salford Crescent and the centre of Manchester, joining the rivers Irk and Medlock. Turning west, it meets the Mersey south of Irlam, where the route of the river was altered in the late 19th century to form part of the course of the Manchester Ship Canal. The ship canal, opened in 1894, forms part of Salford's southern boundaries with Trafford. The city's climate is generally temperate, like the rest of Greater Manchester. The nearest weather station is 10 miles (16 km) away at Ringway, in Manchester; the mean highest and lowest temperatures (13.2 °C (55.8 °F) and 6.4 °C (43.5 °F)) are slightly above the national average, while the annual rainfall (806.6 millimetres (31.76 in)) and average hours of sunshine (1394.5 hours) are respectively above and below the national averages.

== Governance ==
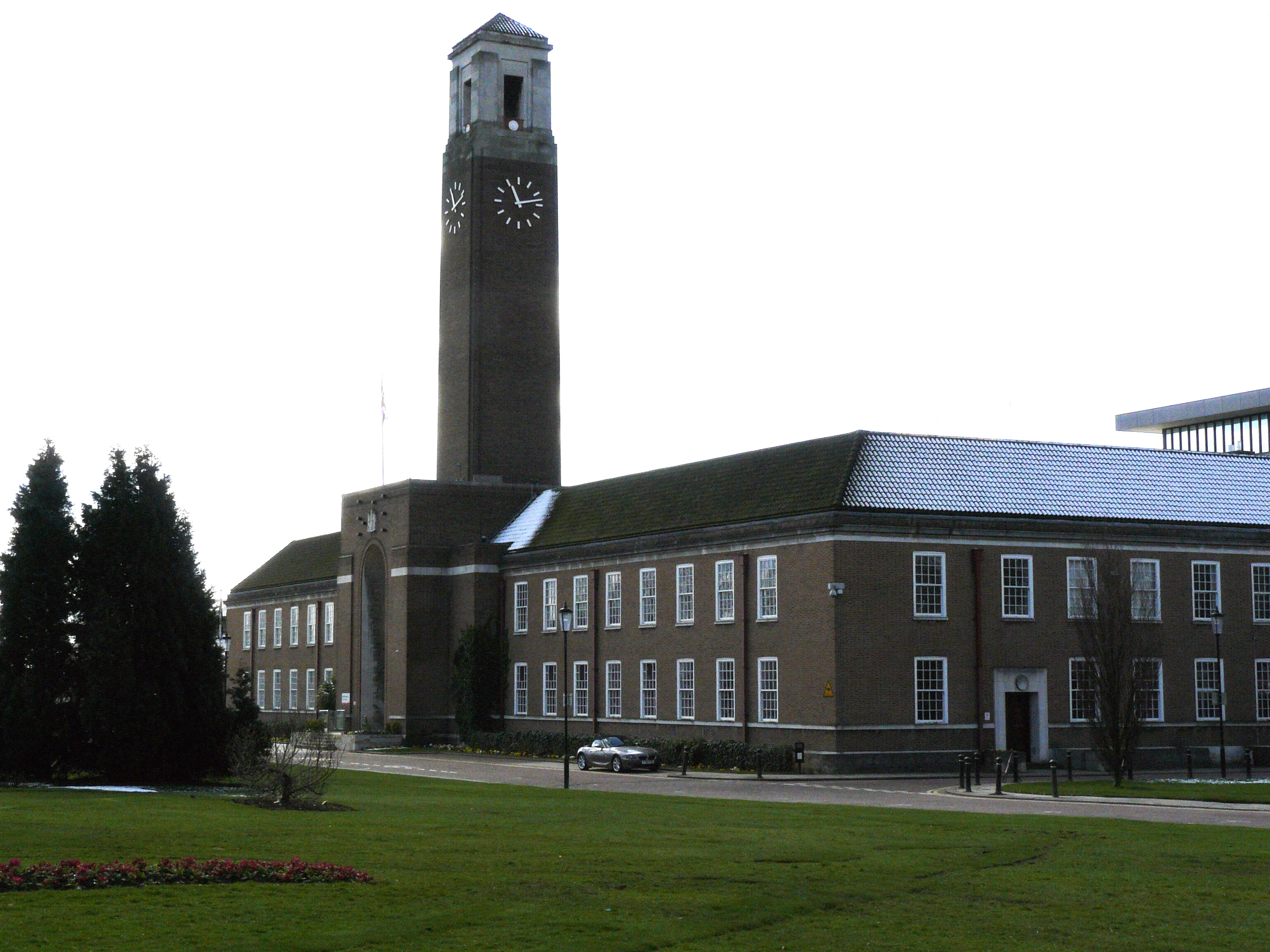
Salford Civic Centre in Swinton. The meeting place of Salford City Council.

=== Parliamentary constituencies ===
The City of Salford is represented by Members of Parliament (MPs) for three constituencies, Salford by Rebecca Long-Bailey (Labour), Worsley and Eccles by Michael Wheeler (Labour), and Blackley and Middleton South by Graham Stringer (Labour).

=== Council ===
In 1974, Salford City Council was created to administer the newly formed local government district. Until 1986, it shared power with the Greater Manchester County Council. The council offices are in Swinton, in what was formerly Swinton and Pendlebury Town Hall. The Labour Party have been in control of the council since its formation in 1974.

Since 2012, in addition to the long-existing and largely ceremonial, annually appointed civic mayor of Salford, the city has also had a directly elected mayor.

==== Electoral wards ====
There are 60 councillors representing 20 wards, each electing three councillors.

Ward name	Area (ha)/mi^{2}	Population (2014)
Barton	244 hectares (0.94 sq mi)	12,462
Boothstown and Ellenbrook	860 hectares (3.3 sq mi)	9,532
Broughton	267 hectares (1.03 sq mi)	14,916
Cadishead	1,476 hectares (5.70 sq mi)	10,739
Claremont	190 hectares (0.73 sq mi)	10,166
Eccles	270 hectares (1.0 sq mi)	11,499
Irlam	935 hectares (3.61 sq mi)	9,857
Irwell Riverside	451 hectares (1.74 sq mi)	12,939
Kersal	313 hectares (1.21 sq mi)	12,929
Langworthy	203 hectares (0.78 sq mi)	12,980
Little Hulton	452 hectares (1.75 sq mi)	13,469
Ordsall	414 hectares (1.60 sq mi)	16,725
Pendlebury	662 hectares (2.56 sq mi)	13,434
Swinton North	349 hectares (1.35 sq mi)	11,473
Swinton South	281 hectares (1.08 sq mi)	11,458
Walkden North	448 hectares (1.73 sq mi)	12,232
Walkden South	361 hectares (1.39 sq mi)	10,185
Weaste and Seedley	354 hectares (1.37 sq mi)	12,616
Winton	370 hectares (1.4 sq mi)	12,339
Worsley	838 hectares (3.24 sq mi)	10,090

=== Central Salford and Salford West ===
The district is divided into two areas (Central Salford and Salford West) for some purposes including planning, regeneration and housing.

- Central Salford is the eastern part of the district and comprises seven wards: Broughton, Claremont, Irwell Riverside, Kersal, Ordsall, Langworthy and Weaste & Seedley. This is the more urban half of the district and lies partly within the Manchester Inner Ring Road. Salford Quays lies within this area. Between 2005 and 2011, the Central Salford Urban Regeneration Company was responsible for urban regeneration in this area, securing over £1 billion of private sector investment. Social housing is provided by Salix Homes in this area.
- Salford West comprises the other 13 wards, including the towns of Eccles, Pendlebury, Swinton and Walkden. This is the more suburban and rural half of the district. Salford City Council's aspiration is that "In 2028, Salford West will be one of the most desirable and prosperous areas in Greater Manchester." Social housing is provided by City West Housing Trust in this area.

=== Coat of arms ===
Coat of arms of City of Salford
Notes Granted 10 June 1974. Crest On a wreath Or and Azure, a demi-griffin Gules gorged with a collar of steel Proper supporting a staff Or flying therefrom a forked pennon Argent charged with three boars' heads erased and erect in fess Sable langued Gules. Escutcheon Azure a shuttle erect between five bees volant two two and one on a chief Or a three-masted ship of the 19th century in full sail Proper between two millrinds Sable. Supporters On either side a lion Gules gorged with a chain of steel Proper pendant therefrom a pentagon Argent that on the dexter charged with a pheon Sable that on the sinister with a boar's head erased Gules armed Or langued Azure and each holding in the interior forepaw a miner's pickaxe Proper. Motto 'Salus Populi Suprema Lex'

The coat of arms of Salford City Council depicts a weaving shuttle surrounded by five bees with a three masted ship above, on a shield flanked by two lions. The blue background with a gold chief is taken from the arms of the city council of the County Borough of Salford, who in turn took it from the colours of the Earl of Chester. The shuttle and five bees represent the industry of the area and five settlements who benefited from the textile industry. The ship is borrowed from the crest of Eccles Borough Council and represents the importance of waterways to the city. The ship is flanked by two millrinds – the iron centres of millstones – symbolising engineering. The lions are taken from the crest of the Borough of Swinton and Pendlebury; they are wearing iron steel chain representing engineering. The shield is topped by a griffin carrying a pennon depicting three boars' heads. The griffin is taken from the crest of Eccles and the boars are from the crest of Irlam Urban District. Beneath the shield is a scroll reading salus populi suprema lex, Latin for "the welfare of the people is the highest law".

== Demography ==
=== Ethnicity ===
Ethnic Group	Year					
Ethnic Group	2001 census		2011 census		2021 census	
Ethnic Group	Number	%	Number	%	Number	%
White: Total	207,746	96.1%	210,862	90%	222,248	82.4%
White: British	200,343	92.7	197,445	84.4	199,614	74.0
White: Irish	3,870	1.8	2,882	1.2	2,882	1.1
White: Gypsy or Irish Traveller	–	–	193	0.1	295	0.1
White: Roma	–	–	–	–	515	0.2
White: Other	3,533	1.6	10,342	4.4	18,942	7.0
Asian or Asian British: Total	4,180	2%	9,429	4.1%	14,938	5.5%
Asian or Asian British: Indian	1,196	0.6	2,553	1.1	3,744	1.4
Asian or Asian British: Pakistani	963	0.4	1,843	0.8	4,074	1.5
Asian or Asian British: Bangladeshi	402	0.2	605	0.3	803	0.3
Asian or Asian British: Chinese	1,191	0.6	2,547	1.1	3,319	1.2
Asian or Asian British: Other Asian	428	0.2	1,881	0.8	2,998	1.1
Black or Black British: Total	1,260	0.6%	6,541	2.8%	16,473	6.1
Black or Black British: African	709	0.3	5,354	2.3	13,477	5.0
Black or Black British: Caribbean	417	0.2	666	0.3	1,338	0.5
Other Black	134	0.1	521	0.2	1,658	0.6
Mixed or British Mixed: Total	2,146	0.9%	4,616	2%	8,501	3.2
Mixed: White and Black Caribbean	839	0.4	1,647	0.7	2,596	1.0
Mixed: White and Black African	318	0.1	1,058	0.5	2,098	0.8
Mixed: White and Asian	495	0.2	929	0.4	1,844	0.7
Mixed: Other Mixed	494	0.2	982	0.4	1,963	0.7
Other: Total	771	0.4%	2,485	1.1%	7,762	2.9
Other: Arab	–	–	1,425	0.6	3,214	1.2
Other: Any other ethnic group	771	0.4	1,060	0.5	4,548	1.7
Total	216,103	100%	233,933	100%	269,923	100%

At the 2011 UK census, the City of Salford had a total population of 233,933. Of the 103,556 households in Salford, 25.4% were married or same-sex civil partnership couples living together, 36.4% were one-person households, 11.2% were co-habiting couples and 13.5% were lone parents. The figures for lone parent households were above the national average of 10.6%, and the percentage of married couples was also below the national average of 33.2%; the proportion of one person households was higher than the national average of 30.3%.

The population density was 24.1 persons per hectare (Salford covers 9,719 hectares), 117,151 (50.1%) female, and 116,782 (49.9%) male. Of those aged 16–74 in Salford, 27.1% had no academic qualifications, significantly higher than 22.5% in all of England. 11.8% of Salford's residents were born outside the United Kingdom, lower than the national average of 13.8%. The largest minority group was recorded as Asian, at 4.1% of the population.

The number of theft from a vehicle offences and theft of a vehicle per 1,000 of the population was 21.3 and 7.9 compared to the English national average of 7.6 and 2.9 respectively. The number of sexual offences was 1.1 compared to the average of 0.9. The national average of violence against another person was 16.7 compared to the Salford average of 27.2. The figures for crime statistics were all recorded during the 2006/7 financial year. Although all were above the averages for England, Salford's crime rate was lower than Manchester's.

=== Population change ===
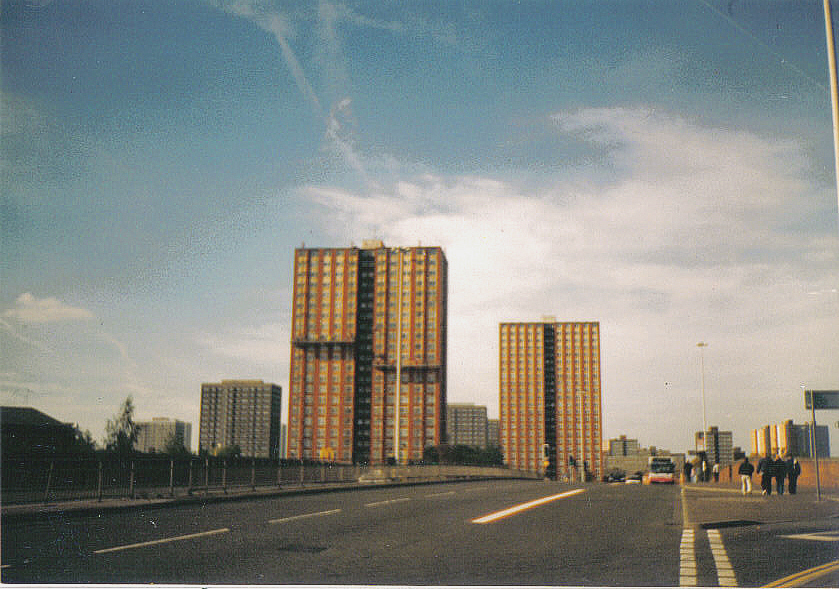
Salford tower blocks in 2001. Tower blocks were mostly built between the 1950s and 1970s.

The table below details the population change since 1801, including the percentage change since the last available census data. Although the City of Salford has existed as a metropolitan borough since 1974, figures have been generated by combining data from the towns, villages, and civil parishes that would later be constituent parts of the city.

Population growth in City of Salford since 1801

Year	Population	±%
1801	29,495	—
1811	38,460	+30.4%
1821	49,114	+27.7%
1831	68,744	+40.0%
1841	91,361	+32.9%
1851	108,699	+19.0%
1861	148,740	+36.8%
1871	188,781	+26.9%

Year	Population	±%
1881	228,822	+21.2%
1891	265,000	+15.8%
1901	296,210	+11.8%
1911	331,098	+11.8%
1921	333,031	+0.6%
1931	334,989	+0.6%
1941	318,152	−5.0%
1951	302,160	−5.0%

Year	Population	±%
1961	291,240	−3.6%
1971	280,739	−3.6%
1981	241,532	−14.0%
1991	230,726	−4.5%
2001	216,103	−6.3%
2011	233,900	+8.2%
2021	269,900	+15.4%

Source: Vision of Britain

=== Religion ===
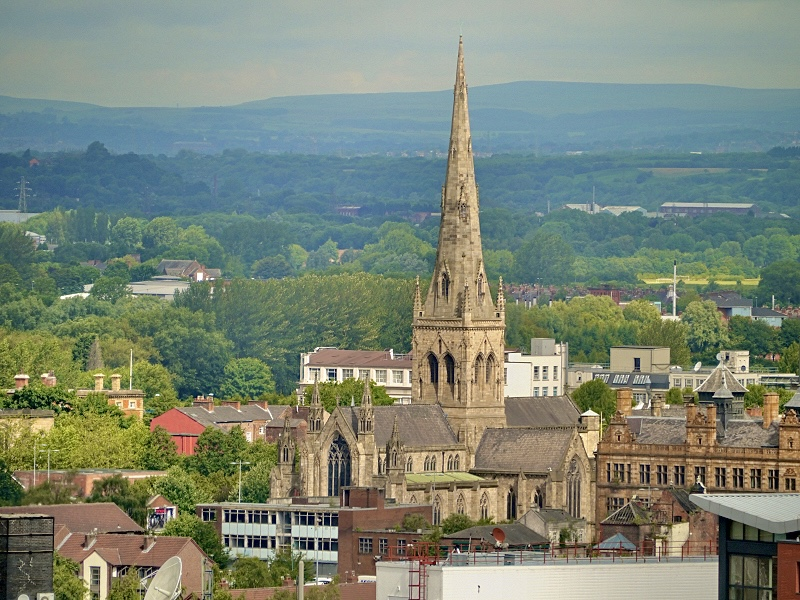
Aerial photo of Salford Cathedral, one of the oldest and most prominent landmarks in the City of Salford. Also the home of the Diocese and Bishop of Salford.

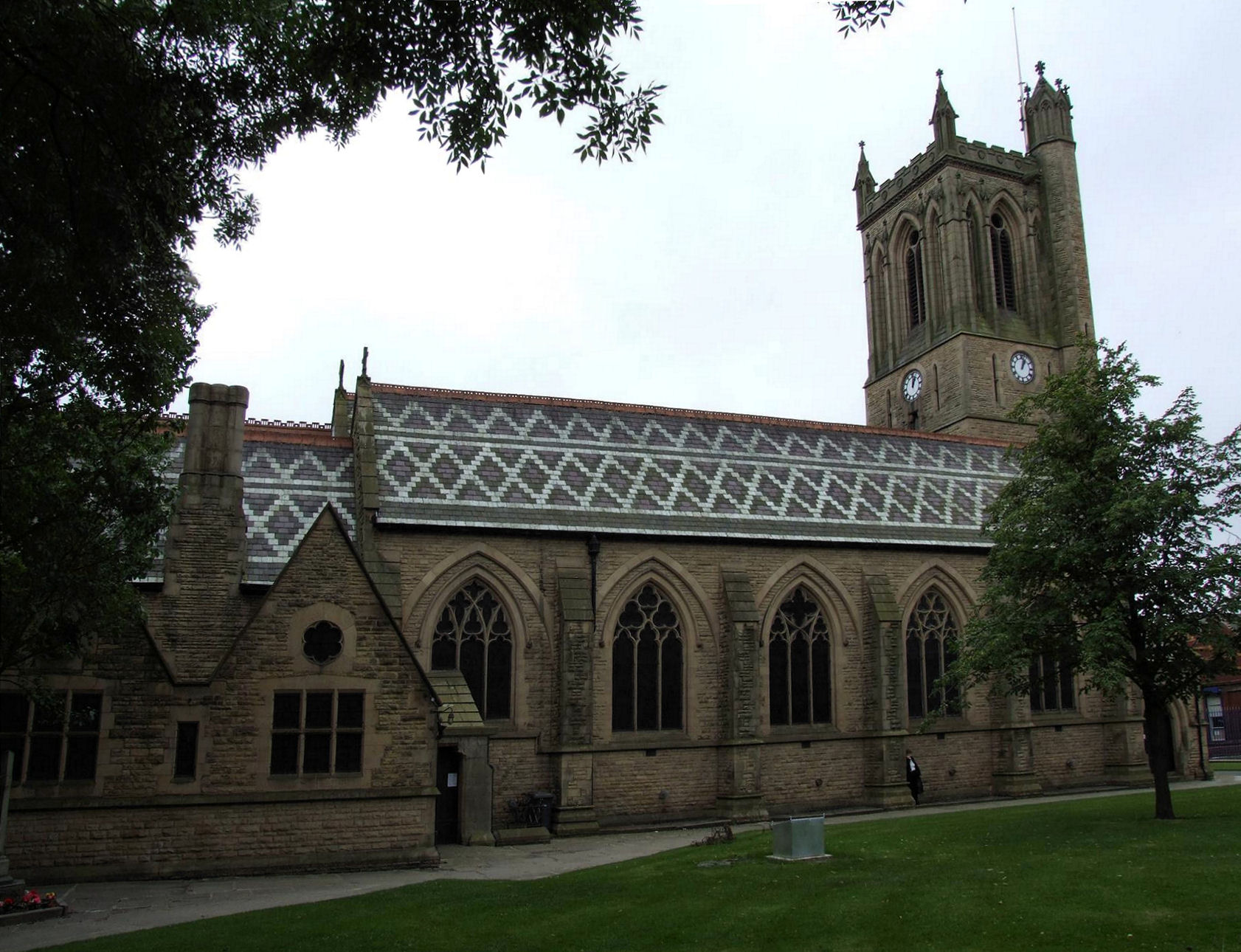
St Peter's Church, Swinton and Pendlebury.

The following table shows the religious identity of residents residing in the city of Salford.

Religion	2011		2021	
Religion	Number	%	Number	%
Christian	150,111	64.2	128,785	47.7
Muslim	6,030	2.6	13,542	5.0
Jewish	7,687	3.3	10,373	3.8
Hindu	1,504	0.6	2,113	0.8
Sikh	324	0.1	728	0.3
Buddhism	1,040	0.4	1,022	0.4
Other religion	691	0.3	1,068	0.4
No religion	52,105	22.3	96,140	35.6
Religion not stated	14,441	6.2	16,152	6.0
Total	233,933	100.00%	269,923	100.00%

Salford is covered by the Roman Catholic Diocese of Salford, and the Church of England Diocese of Manchester.

During the mid-19th century, there was an influx of Irish people into the Salford area, largely due to the famine in Ireland. In 1848, Salford Roman Catholic Cathedral was consecrated, reflecting Salford's large Irish-born community at the time.

Of Salford's six Grade I listed buildings, three are churches. St Augustine's Church, Pendlebury, was built in 1874 by George Frederick Bodley. The Church of St Mary the Virgin, in Eccles, was originally built in the 13th century but was expanded in the 15th. A church has been on the site since at least the 12th century. St Mark's Church, Worsley was built in 1846 by George Gilbert Scott. The six Grade II* listed churches are the Church of St Andrew in Eccles, the Cathedral Church of St John, the Church of St Luke in Pendleton, Monton Unitarian Church in Monton, the Church of St Philip in Salford, and the United Reformed Church.

== Economy ==
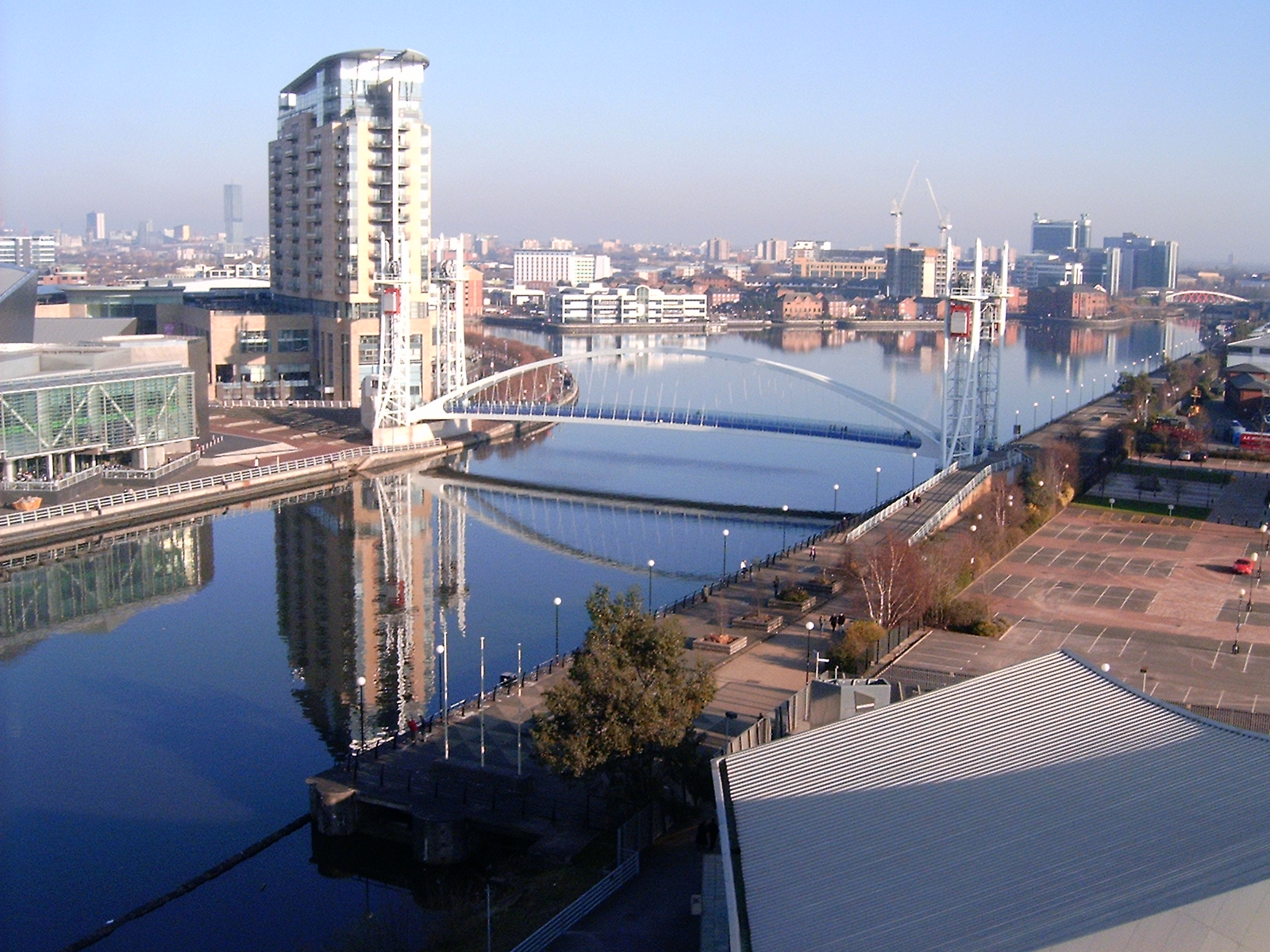
Salford Quays

Salford Docks (also called Manchester Docks) were opened by Queen Victoria in 1894, providing docks in Manchester and Salford for the Manchester Ship Canal which linked Manchester to the sea. During the 1970s, the docks fell into decline as they proved too small for new, larger ships, and when they were abandoned in 1982 over 3,000 people lost their jobs. Salford City Council purchased the docks in 1984 and since then they underwent regeneration as a centre of tourism in Salford, which included the construction of the Lowry Centre. More than 10,000 people are employed in the Quays in jobs such as retail, construction, and e-commerce. In 2007, it was confirmed that the BBC would be moving five of its departments to a new development on Pier 9 of Salford Quays, called MediaCityUK. The move was completed in 2011.

City of Salford Compared
2011 UK Census	City of Salford	North West	England
Population of working age	173,117	5,184,216	38,881,374
Full-time employment	39.3%	37.5%	38.6%
Part-time employment	12.5%	13.9%	13.7%
Self employed	6.6%	8.2%	9.8%
Unemployed	5.2%	4.7%	4.4%
Retired	12.1%	14.8%	13.7%

Finance and professional services, tourism and culture, and computer and internet based services have been identified as growth industries in Greater Manchester and are concentrated in Manchester and Salford. Average house prices in the City of Salford are sixth out of all the metropolitan boroughs in Greater Manchester, 7.6% lower than the average for the county. There are, however, areas of considerable affluence, within the city, such as Broughton Park, parts of Kersal, Ellesmere Park, Worsley, parts of Swinton and Pendlebury and the ultra-modern Salford Quays.

At the 2011 UK census, Salford had 173,117 residents aged 16 to 74. 4.7% of these people were students with jobs, 4.1% looking after home or family, 6.9% permanently sick or disabled and 2.9% economically inactive for other reasons. The City of Salford has a high rate of people who are permanently sick and disabled, 70% higher than the national average of 4.0%.

In 2011, of 106,904 residents of the City of Salford in employment, the industry of employment was: 17.8% retail and wholesale; 7.6% manufacturing;13.7% health and social work; 8.7% education; 7.2% construction; 5.2% transport and storage; 6.6% accommodation and food service; 6.2% administrative and support services; 6.0% professional, scientific and technical; 5.1% public administration and defence; 4.4% financial and insurance; 3.4% information and communication; 1.6% real estate; 0.9% water supply and waste management; 0.6% energy supply; 0.1% agriculture, forestry and fishing; 0.1% mining and quarrying; and 4.7% other. This was roughly in line with national figures, except for the proportion of jobs in agriculture which is less than half the national average, reflecting the city's suburban nature and its proximity to the centre of Manchester.

JCDecaux UK has its Manchester office in the Metroplex Business Park in Salford.

== Culture ==
=== Museums and arts ===
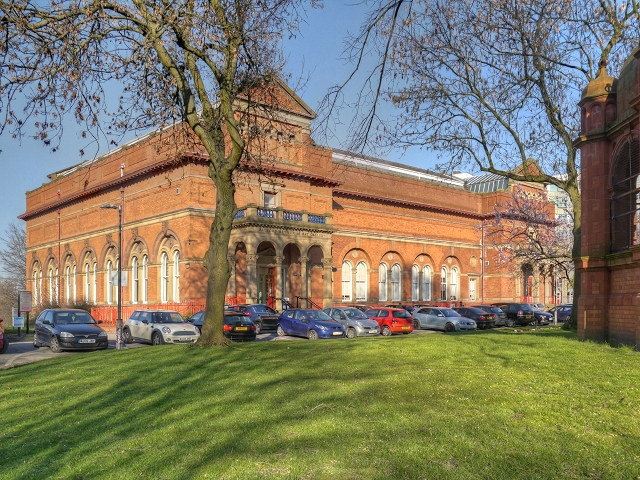
Salford Museum and Art Gallery

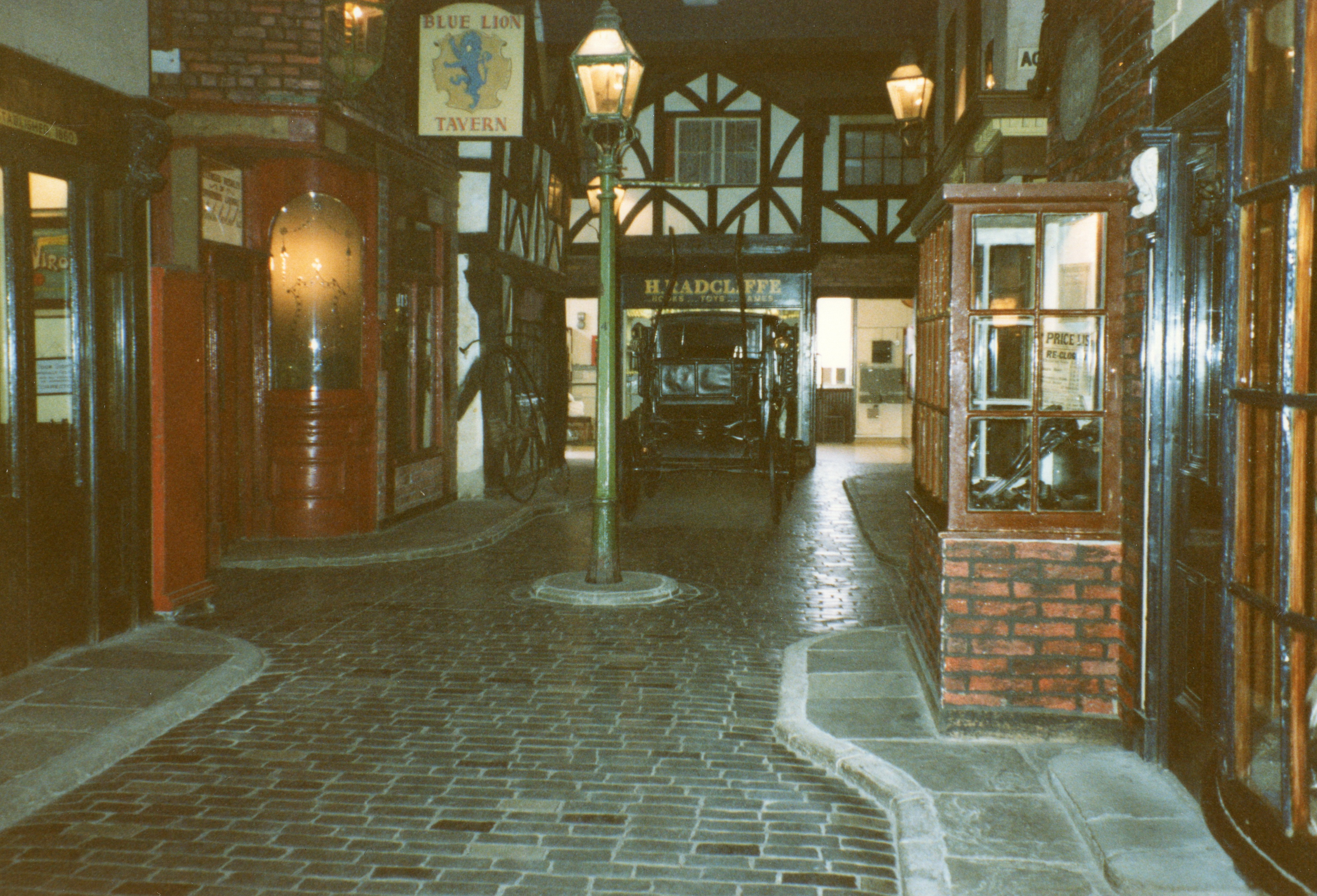
The Lark Hill Place exhibit, Salford Museum

Salford Museum and Art Gallery is situated in Peel Park. Opened in 1850, the institution is devoted to the history of Salford and Victorian art and architecture. The Salford collection includes works by artists such as Christian Ludwig Bokelmann, Charles Landseer and Thomas Henry Illidge, and ceramics from Pilkington's Lancastrian Pottery & Tiles. Its extensive collection of artworks by the Salford-born painter L. S. Lowry was transferred to The Lowry in 2000. The museum also contains an indoor re-creation of a typical Victorian street, Lark Hill Place, which was built in 1957 using shop fronts that had been saved from demolition.

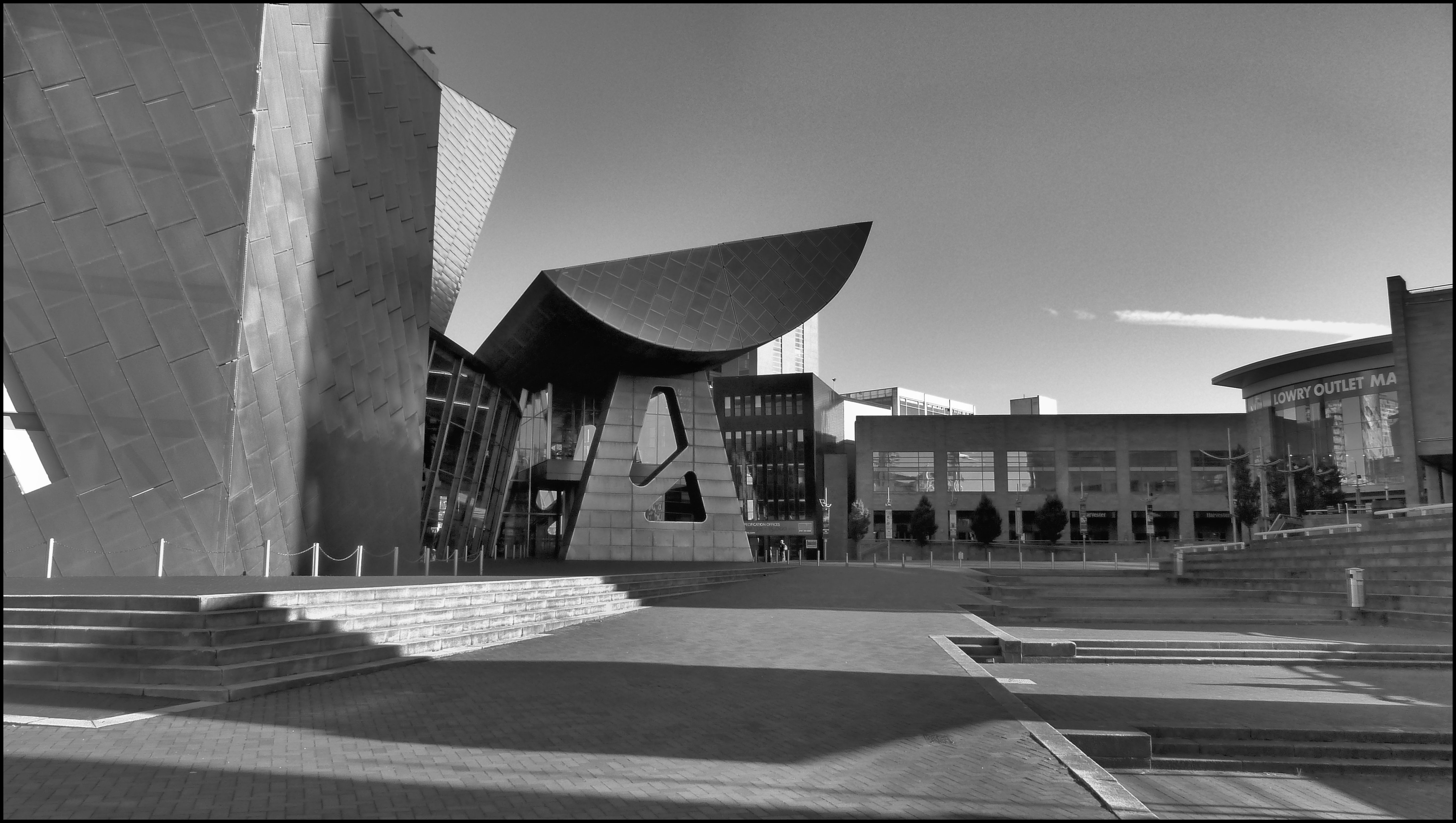
The Lowry, Salford Quays

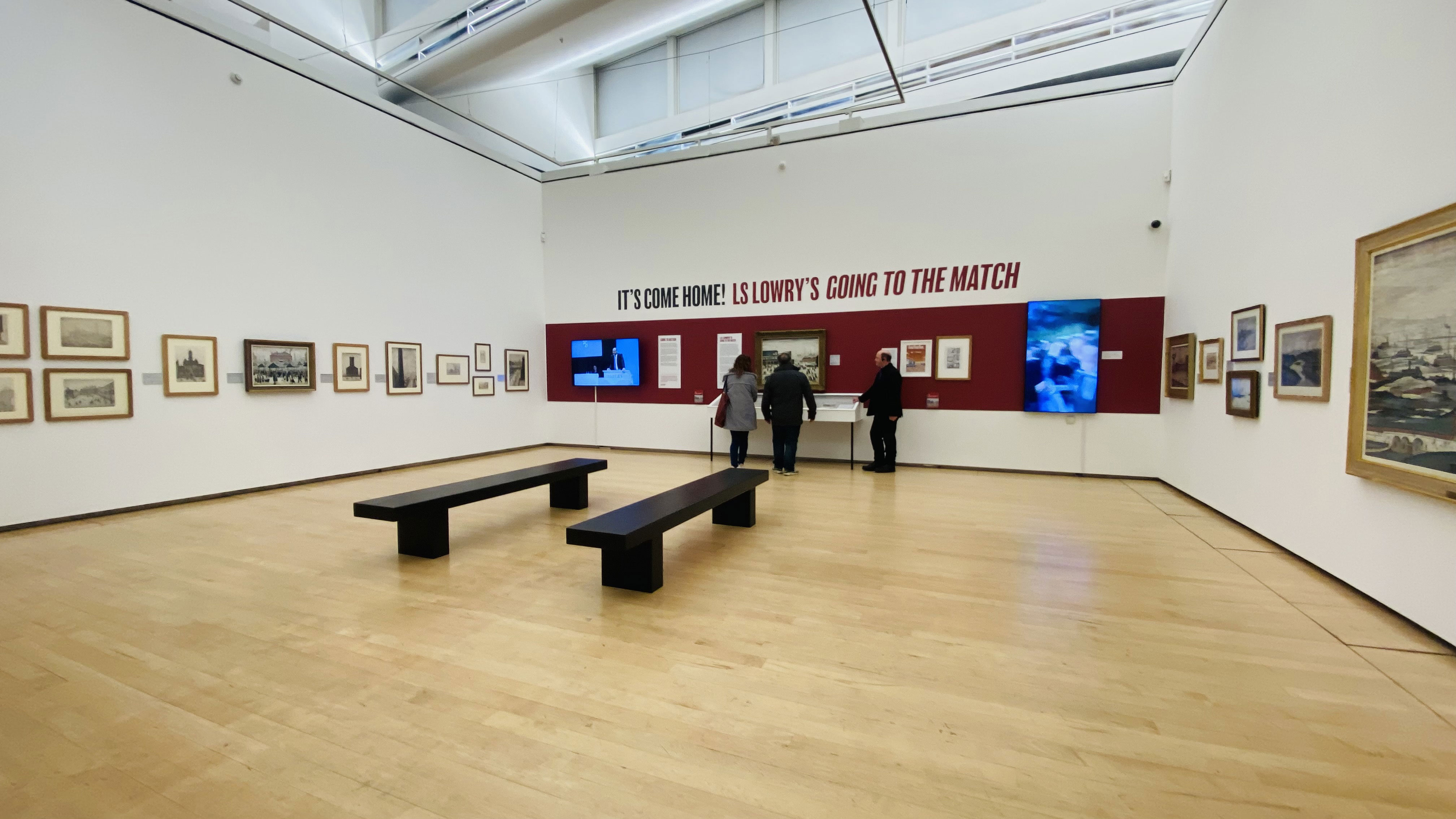
The L.S. Lowry permanent exhibition

At the southern edge of Salford lies The Lowry arts centre, on the waterfront of Salford Quays. Opened in 2000, it is named after the artist and houses the city's collection of Lowry artworks. Notable paintings on display there include Going to the Match (1953) and Industrial Landscape (1953). The building also contains two theatres and a drama studio, hosting drama, concerts, opera and dance events.

=== Landmarks ===
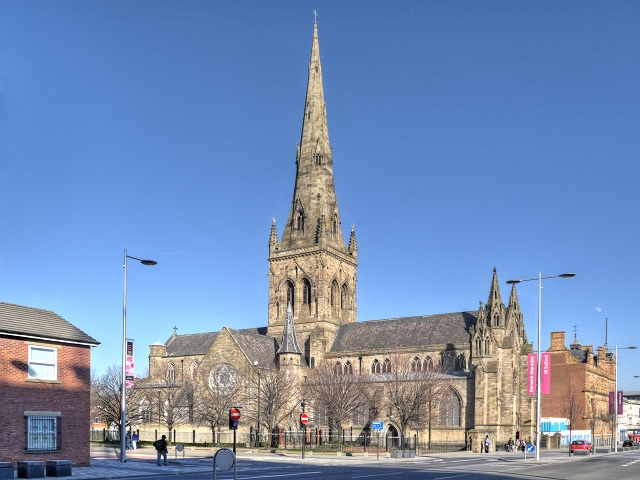
Salford Cathedral

As of September 2003, the City of Salford has 6 Grade I, 14 Grade II*, and 253 Grade II listed buildings. The city has the equal second highest number of Grade I listed buildings out of the districts of Greater Manchester, behind Manchester. The Grade I listed buildings are the Church of St Augustine, the Parish Church of St Mary the Virgin, St Mark's Church, Ordsall Hall, Wardley Hall, and a bridge over the River Irwell. Salford Cathedral, built in 1845, is the seat of the Roman Catholic Diocese of Salford and a Grade II* listed building. Most of Salford's tallest buildings are mid-20th century residential tower blocks or 21st century high rise apartments. A study by Christopher Collier of the University of Salford suggested that Manchester's drizzly climate is largely due to the multitude of high-rise blocks in Salford. Collier has proposed that they have a "dramatic influence on the region's weather patterns", and may contribute to the 8 °C (14 °F) temperature difference between Salford and its surrounding countryside.

There are three Scheduled Ancient Monuments in the city. The oldest is an Iron Age promontory fort occupied from 500 BC–200 AD. Also scheduled is Hanging Bridge on the border with Manchester, dating to the 14th century, and an underground section of the Bridgewater Canal in Swinton built in 1759.

=== Sport ===
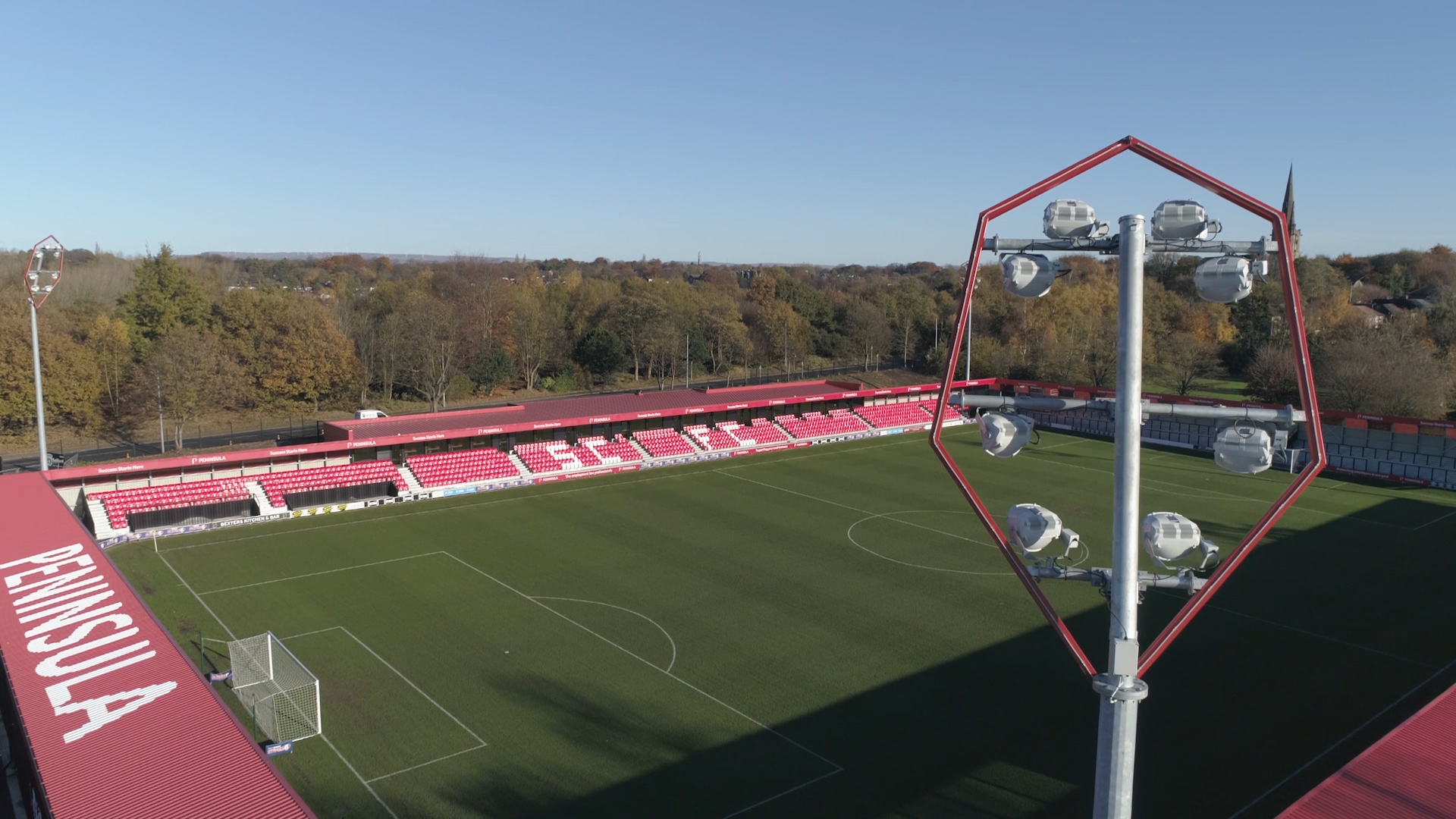
Salford City Football Club stadium, Peninsula Stadium on Moor Lane, Salford. The spire of the cathedral is partly visible.

Salford is home to a number of past and present rugby league teams. Founded in 1873, Salford Red Devils play in the Super League at the AJ Bell Stadium, in Barton, Salford. They are 6 times Champions and they won the Challenge Cup in 1938, and have experienced two previous stretches in the Super League, 1997–2002 and 2004–2007. In 2008 they won the Northern Rail Cup beating Doncaster 60–0 in the Final at Blackpool. They previously won the same trophy in 2003. They also won the National League 1 Grand Final in 2008, beating Celtic Crusaders after extra time in Warrington. Construction on a new 20,000 seat £35 million pound stadium was complete in 2012. Now named the AJ Bell stadium it is home to Salford Red Devils and Sale Sharks rugby union team.

Swinton Lions were founded in 1866 and play in the Championship at heywood road sale. They won the Rugby Football League Championship six times between 1927 and 1964, before it was superseded by Super League. They have also won the Challenge Cup three times between 1900 and 1928.

Broughton Rangers were founded in 1877 and won the Rugby League Challenge Cup in the 1901–02 and 1910–11 seasons. The club folded in 1955, but were reformed as a local amateur club in 2007 with the support of Salford Red Devils.

At amateur level, the city is represented in rugby league by the Langworthy Reds. They are the oldest amateur rugby league club in Salford.

Also in Salford are several football and cricket teams. Irlam F.C. is an amateur football team that has played in the Manchester Football League since 1989. They were founded in 1969 as Mitchell Shackleton Football Club and changed their name in 2006. Salford City F.C. was founded in 1940 and play in the Football League Two. Monton & Weaste C.C. and Clifton C.C. have played in the Central Lancashire Cricket League since 2005 and 2006 respectively. Walkden play in the Bolton Cricket League. Little Hulton play in the Bolton and District Cricket Association. Winton and Worsley play in the Manchester and District Cricket Association.

== Education ==
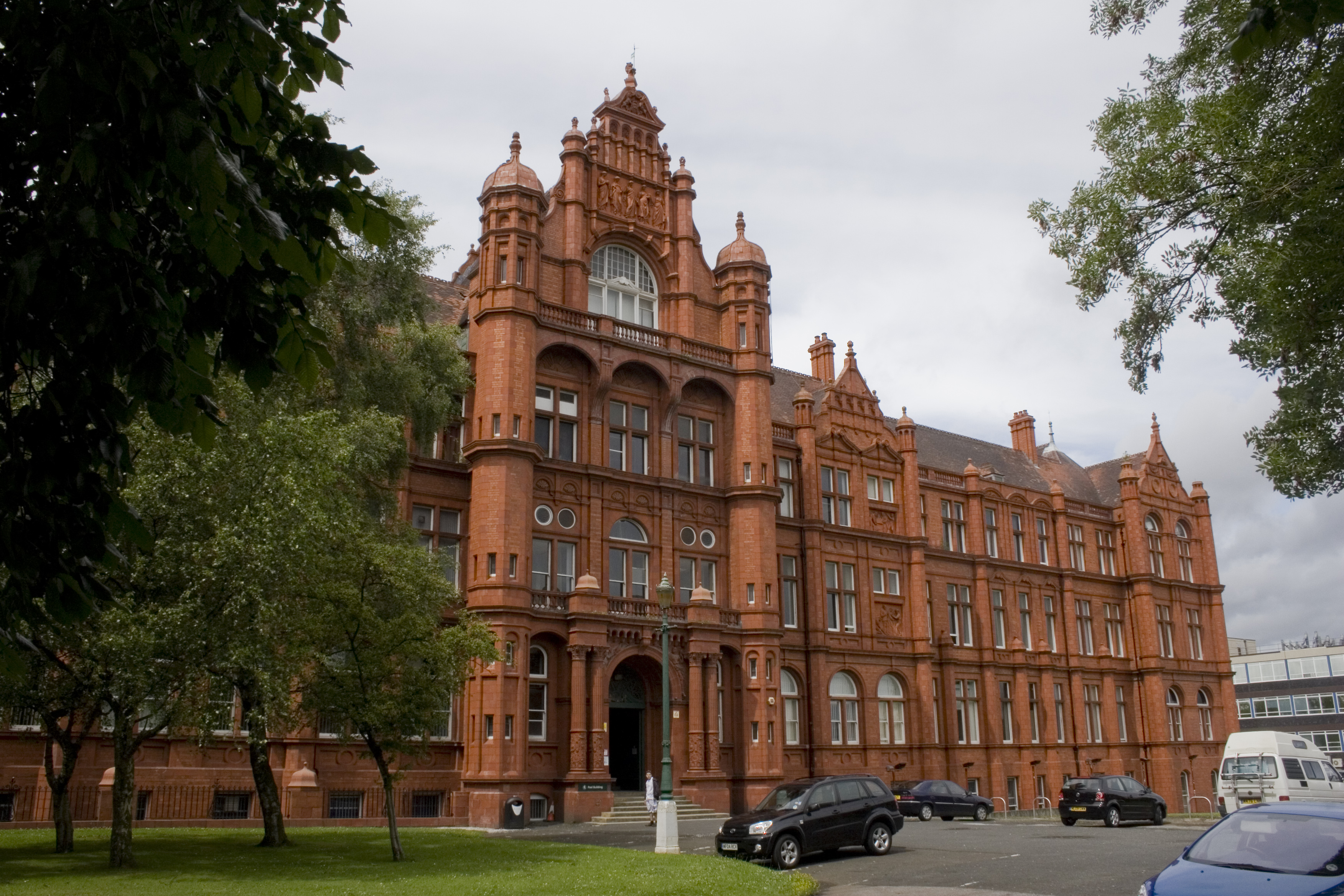
Established in 1967, the University of Salford is one of four universities in Greater Manchester and has approximately 19,000 students.

Overall, Salford was ranked 75th out of all the Local Education Authorities (LEAs) – and seventh in Greater Manchester – in National Curriculum assessment performance in 2007. Unauthorised absences and authorised absences from Salford secondary schools in 2006–07 were 2.0% and 7.0% respectively, both higher than the national average (1.4% and 6.4%). In 2007, the Salford LEA was ranked 127th out of 149 in the country – and ninth in Greater Manchester – based on the percentage of pupils attaining at least 5 A*–C grades at General Certificate of Secondary Education (GCSE) including maths and English (37.8% compared with the national average of 46.7%). In 2007, Beis Yaakov High School was the most successful school in Salford at GCSE, with 90% of the pupils gaining five or more GCSEs at A*–C grade including maths and English. Bridgewater School was the most successful at A–level.

The University of Salford is one of four universities in Greater Manchester and was ranked 81st by The Times. It has over 19,000 students and a 69.7% level of student satisfaction. In 2007, the university received nearly 17,000 applications for 3,660 places. The university is undergoing £150M of redevelopment through investment in new facilities, including a £10M law school and a £22M building for health and social care which were opened in 2006. In 2007, the drop out rate from the university was 25%. Of the students graduating, 50% gained first class or 2:1 degrees, which is below the national average of about 55%.

== Transport ==
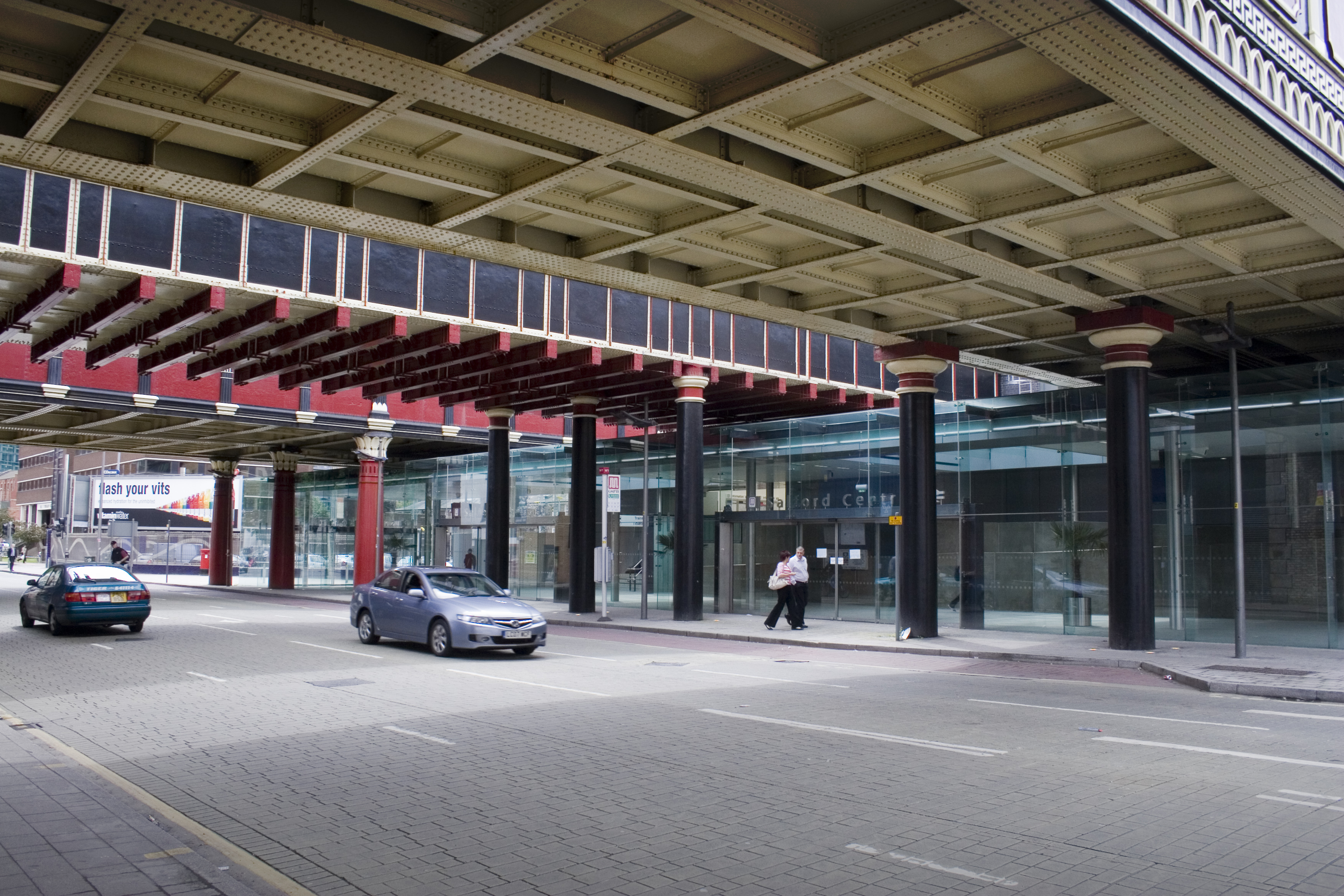
Salford Central railway station

The city of Salford is served by nine railway stations on four routes. Eccles and Patricroft are on the northern route of the Liverpool to Manchester Line, while Irlam, in the southwest of the borough, is on the southern route. Clifton is on the line to Bolton and Preston; Swinton, Moorside and Walkden are on the Manchester to Southport Line via Wigan; and Salford Central and Salford Crescent are served by both routes. A station at Pendleton was closed in 1998 after suffering fire damage and a loss of patronage in favour of nearby Salford Crescent, opened a few years earlier. All train services are provided by Northern, though First transpennine offer occasional services during peak hours.

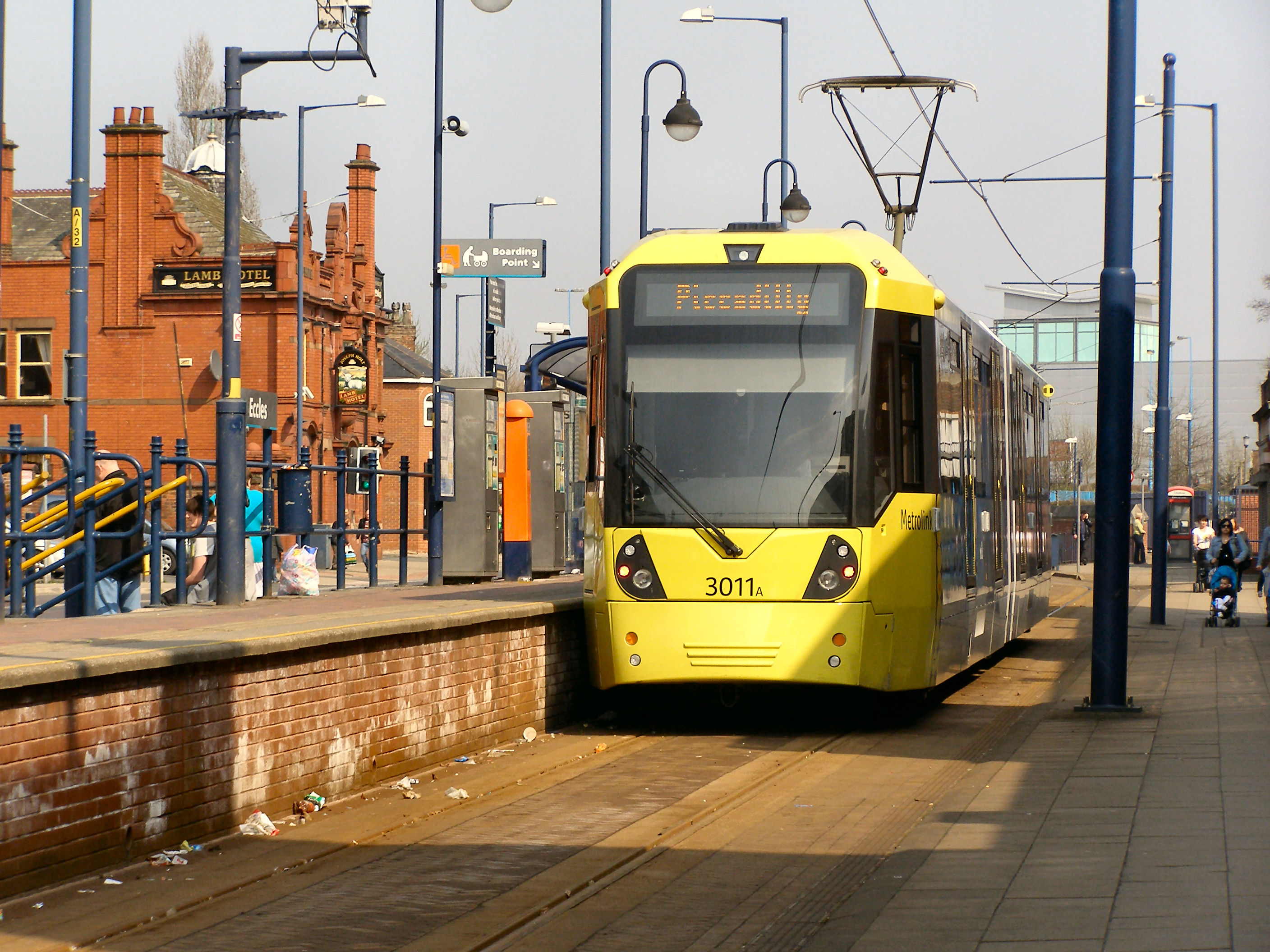
Eccles tram stop

The Eccles line of the Manchester Metrolink runs through the City of Salford, with stations at Exchange Quay, Salford Quays, Anchorage, Harbour City, Broadway, Langworthy, Weaste, Ladywell and Eccles. The line was opened in two stages, in 1999 and 2000, as Phase 2 of the system's development. In 2010 a new tram stop was opened at MediaCityUK, a 1 stop spur off the main Eccles line. Trams operate from here to Etihad Campus, sharing most of the route with the Eccles to Ashton line. Some Eccles and Ashton bound services also stop here, especially during peak hours. These lines provide good access for Eccles and the Quays to the rest of Greater Manchester.

There are bus stations at Pendleton and Eccles. Buses run to destinations throughout the city, across Greater Manchester and further afield: Pendleton is served by a route to Preston, Eccles Interchange is next to the Metrolink stop.

The council is responsible for the administration and maintenance of public roads and footpaths in the city.

Since 2020, electric scooters have been available for public hire in central Salford, Salford Quays, Ordsall, Pendleton and at the University of Salford. The e-scooter hire service is operated by shared micromobility company Lime.

== Notable people ==
- Jason Manford (born 1981), comedian and actor
- Mark E. Smith (1957-2018), leader of post-punk band The Fall
- Harry Williams (born 1929), footballer
- Tom Aspinall (born 1993), UFC fighter
- Don Whillans (1933-1985), Rock Climber & Mountaineer, first ascent (with Dougal Haston) of south face of Annapurna in 1970)
- Brian Birch (1931-1989), football player and manager

== Twin towns ==
The City of Salford has formal twinning arrangements with four European places and one in Canada. Each was originally twinned with a place within the city prior to its creation in 1974.

- Clermont-Ferrand, France (originally twinned with County Borough of Salford in 1966)
- Lünen, Germany (Municipal Borough of Swinton and Pendlebury, 1966)
- Narbonne, France (Municipal Borough of Eccles, 1957)
- Saint-Ouen, France (Worsley Urban District, 1961)

== Freedom of the City ==
The following people and military units have received the Freedom of the City of Salford.

=== Individuals ===
- Benjamin Armitage: January 1899.
- Benn Wolfe Levy: January 1899.
- David Lloyd George: October 1922.
- Frederick Smith, 1st Baron Colwyn: July 1933.
- Edward Arthur Hardy: January 1960.
- L. S. Lowry: March 1965.
- Sir Peter Maxwell Davies: November 2004.
- Nelson Rolihlahla Mandela: 30 November 2005.
- Ryan Giggs: January 2010.
- Harold Riley: 15 November 2017.
- Mike Leigh: 24 July 2019.
- Ben Wallsworth: 30 October 2019.

- Alan Henning: 28 April 2023.
- John Cooper Clarke: 19 July 2023.

=== Military units ===
Military units:

- The Lancashire Fusiliers: 18 October 1947.
- The Royal Regiment of Fusiliers: 26 April 1975.

== See also ==
- 2006 Salford Council election
- Salford local elections
- Mayor of Salford
- List of tallest buildings and structures in Salford
- List of Scheduled Monuments in Greater Manchester
- Grade I listed buildings in Greater Manchester
- Grade II* listed buildings in Greater Manchester
- List of public art in Greater Manchester
