= Burnden =

Coordinates: 53.563932°N 2.412723°W

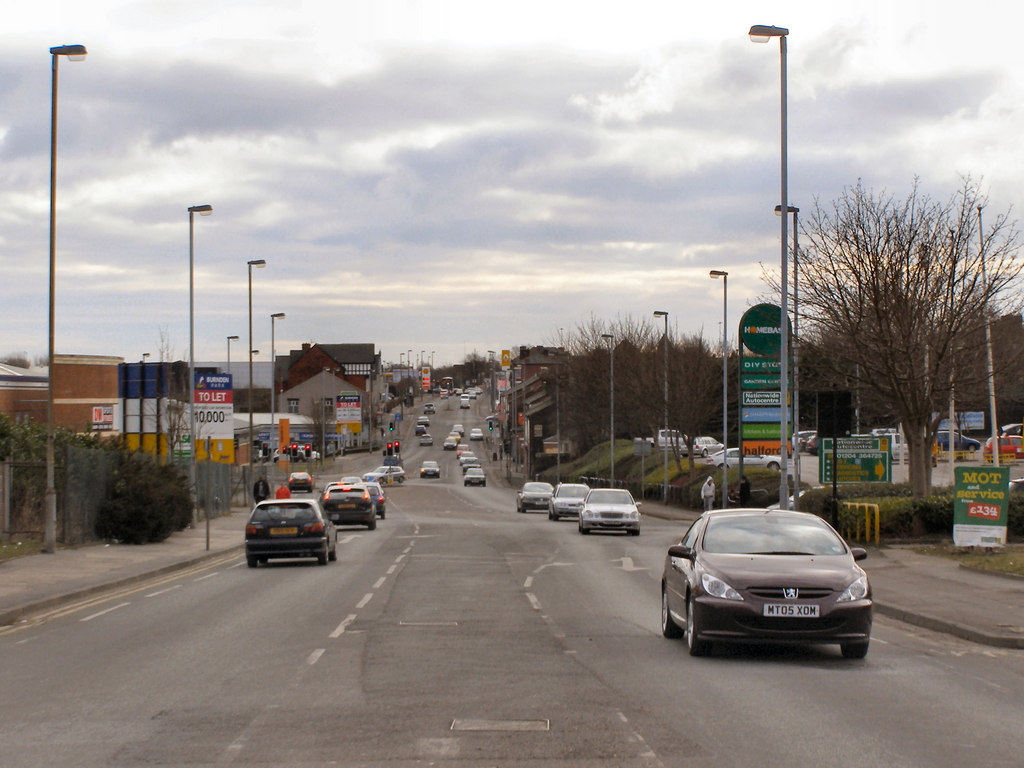
- Manchester Road, Burnden

- Location within Greater Manchester
- OS grid reference: SD727075
- Metropolitan borough: Bolton
- Metropolitan county: Greater Manchester
- Region: North West
- Country: England
- Sovereign state: United Kingdom
- Post town: Bolton
- Postcode district: BL3
- Dialling code: 01204
- Police: Greater Manchester
- Fire: Greater Manchester
- Ambulance: North West
- UK Parliament: Bolton South and Walkden

Burnden is a district in the town of Bolton in Greater Manchester, England. It is located about 1 mile (2 km) southeast of Bolton town centre.

Historically a part of Lancashire, Burnden derives its name from two Old English words. The first part "burn" means a stream or a brook and is more popularly used in the Scottish Lowlands. The second part "dene" or "denu" means a valley. Combined, they mean a brook flowing through a valley. Burnden Brook was a small tributary of the River Croal, but has since been culverted and now runs beneath Manchester Road.

In the late 18th century, Burnden was the site of the Burnden Poorhouse which was used by many townships of the parishes of Bolton le Moors and Deane to house their paupers.

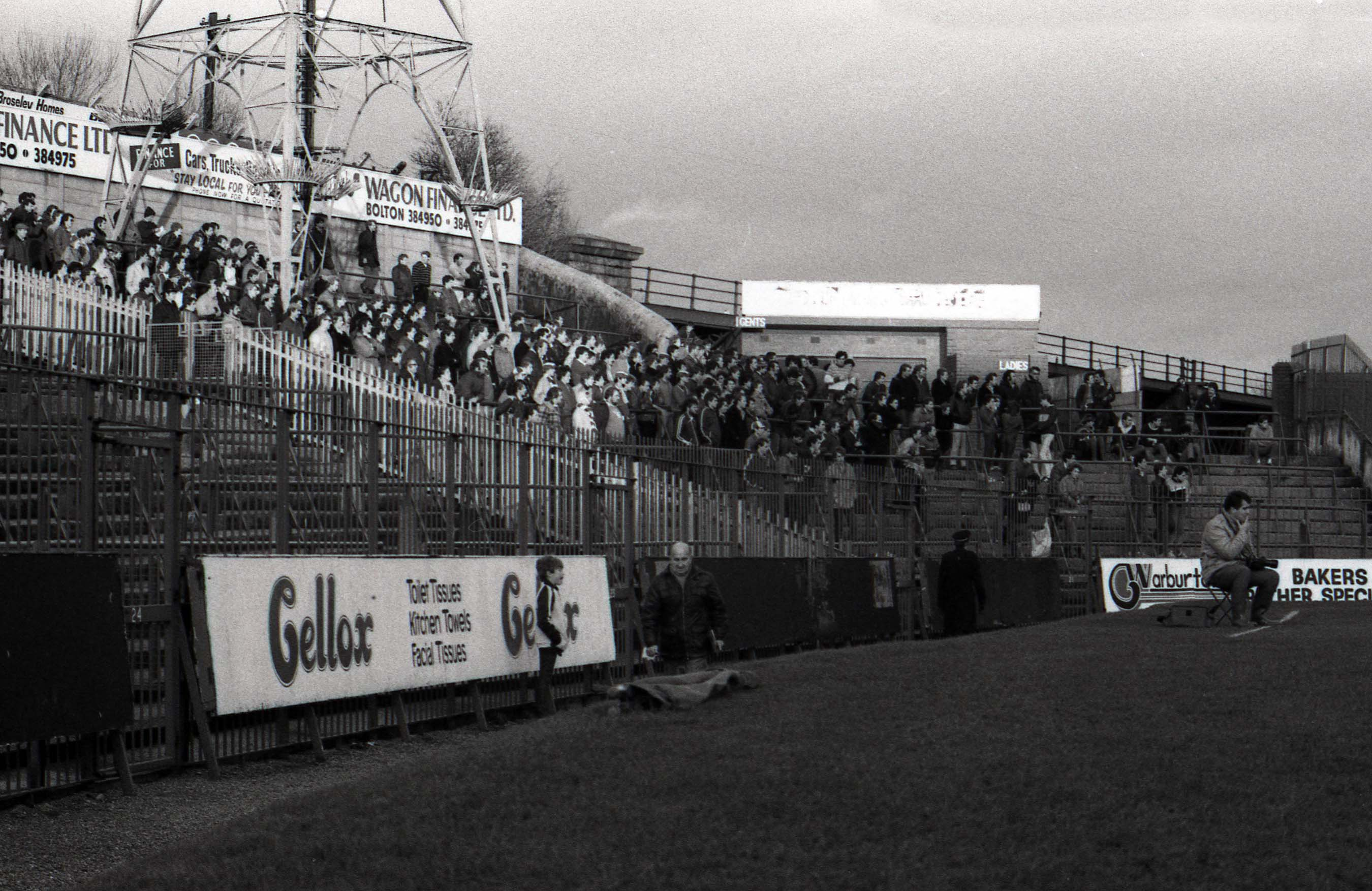
The Railway End terrace at Burnden Park stadium in 1983

For just over a hundred years Burnden was the site of Burnden Park, the home of Bolton Wanderers. The stadium featured in a noted 1953 painting by the Salford-born artist L.S. Lowry, Going to the Match, which is now on public display at The Lowry arts centre in Salford Quays.

The area was described as a ghost town after the stadium, the Normid superstore and the greyhound track closed in quick succession in the late 1990s.
