= Portrait of Ann =

1957 painting by L. S. Lowry

- Artist: L. S. Lowry
- Year: 1957
- Medium: Oil on board
- Movement: Naïve art
- Dimensions: 35.5 cm × 30.5 cm (14 in × 12 in)
- Location: The Lowry, Salford

Portrait of Ann (1957) is a painting by British artist L. S. Lowry (1887–1976). Opinion remains divided as to the identity of the subject, who appears in many of Lowry's works, and her significance for the artist.

== Background ==
Lowry was elected an Associate of the Royal Academy in 1955, an appointment that brought him a wider recognition in the art world than he had been previously afforded. On 1 November 1957 he appeared on the front page of The Manchester Guardian with his proposal for the academy's Spring Exhibition the following year. Although Lowry had painted portraits before (cf. the 'Horrible Heads' series from the 1930s), Portrait of Ann was seen as a major departure from Lowry's stock images of industrial scenes and millscapes – not least because Lowry very rarely used women as his subjects. Lowry described the style of the painting as being "modernist", explaining that the sitter "did not want her picture to be realistic; it had to be stylised." In common with Lowry's other oil paintings, Ann was executed using ivory black, vermilion, prussian blue, yellow ochre and flake white with no medium.

Upon its eventual exhibition, the painting was criticised by the art critic G.S. Whittet in the August 1958 edition of The Studio as having a "crudely stylised face", but it was not without its supporters; Nesta Ellis, writing for the Sphinx art journal, thought the painting "gave the impression of an impassive yet willful woman". Ann was never sold at auction, but instead remained the property of the artist until it was bequeathed to Salford Museum and Art Gallery upon his death in 1976.

== The subject ==
Lowry told the features reporter for the Manchester Guardian that Ann was 25 years old, lived in Leeds and was "the daughter of some people who have been very good to me." The architect and Manchester academician Frank Bradly, a friend of Lowry's, stated that Lowry had told him she was a pupil of his mother's who had died when she was 25. The artists Harold Riley and Pat Gerrard Cooke both claim that Lowry informed them Ann was a friend from Lytham St Annes who died when she was in her early twenties. When Portrait of Ann was included as part of Manchester City Art Gallery's Lowry retrospective in 1959, however, the exhibition catalogue listed the work as being "lent by the sitter" (named on the index of lenders as a 'Miss Ann Helder') although, unlike the other works included at the exhibition, no correspondence appears to exist between the curatorial team and the owner.

== Sources ==
- Howard, Michael (2000). Lowry — A Visionary Artist. Salford Quays: Lowry Press.
- Rohde, Shelley (2000). L.S. Lowry: A Biography. Salford Quays: Lowry Press.
