= Going to the Match =

Painting by L. S. Lowry

- Artist: L. S. Lowry
- Year: 1953
- Medium: Oil on canvas
- Movement: Naïve art
- Dimensions: 71 cm × 91.5 cm (28 in × 36.0 in)
- Location: The Lowry, Salford
- Accession: LOL084

Going to the Match is the title of several paintings by British painter L. S. Lowry, depicting crowds of spectators walking towards a sports ground. Lowry's best known Going to the Match painting is his 1953 painting of football fans heading towards Burnden Park, the then home of Bolton Wanderers Football Club. Two earlier works of this title also exist: a 1928 painting depicting fans outside a rugby ground, and a 1946 painting of a crowd of sports fans.

In 2021 the 1928 painting was valued at between £2 and £3 million and is now in a private collection. Lowry's 1953 Going to the Match was on loan to The Lowry arts centre in Salford between 2012 and 2022, and was sold at auction for £7.8 million in 2022.

== Description ==
=== Going to the Match (1928) ===
External videos
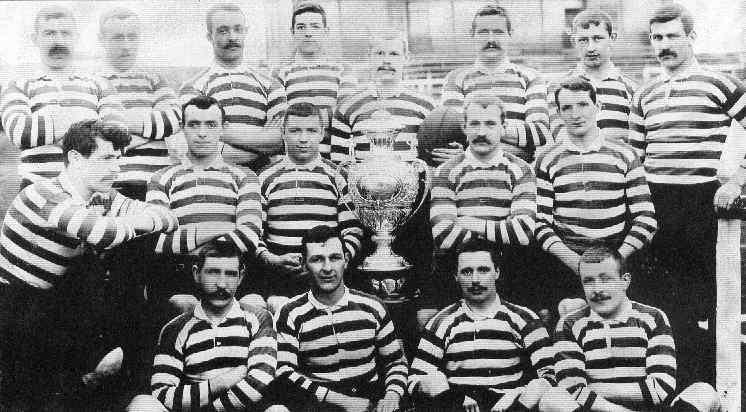
- Video: Lowry's Rare Rugby Painting is More Poignant Than Ever - Frances Christie explores the importance of Rugby League in Northern culture

L. S. Lowry's 1928 painting Going to the Match (oil on canvas, 42.5 × 53.3 cm) depicts a crowd of rugby league fans walking right to left across the canvas to a rugby match. The goal posts of the rugby pitch can be seen in the background to the left, and behind the crowd are industrial buildings, a smoking factory chimney and a church. It is one of Lowry's earliest depictions of sporting events and representative of Lowry's understanding of the importance of rugby league to the communities of Northern England. It is also one of only two known depictions of rugby supporters by Lowry, the other, Coming from the Match, was painted in 1959.

The closest rugby league teams to Lowry's home in Pendlebury was Swinton; it is thought that the blue and red scarves worn by different people in the crowd and the red flag flying by the rugby ground indicate that this was a match played by Swinton against Salford. The 1928 painting was displayed in the UK for the first time since 1966, at a 2012 exhibition in The Lowry, before being auctioned at Sotheby's, estimated at between £2 million and £3 million. It is now in a private collection.

=== Going to the Match (1946) ===
Another work by Lowry, Going to the Match (oil on panel 28 x 49.5 cm), dates from 1946. This work is in a private collection and was on long-term loan to The Lowry from 2012 to 2022.

=== Going to the Match (1953) ===
Going to the Match (1953) depicts a large crowd of football supporters flocking towards the Burnden Park football stadium in Burnden, Bolton, in Lancashire, the home of Bolton Wanderers F.C. until 1999. Within the stadium, crowds already fill the stands in anticipation of a football match. In the distance can be seen rows of terraced houses and smoking factory chimneys.

The painting originally bore the title The Football Match before it was renamed. While the distant industrial buildings in this painting are an invented, generic scene (comparable with Lowry's many other Industrial Landscape paintings), the football ground is identifiably Burnden Park. Lowry was a football fan who supported Manchester City F.C., and he lived in Pendlebury, just 6 miles (9.7 km) miles from the Bolton Wanderers ground. Lowry appreciated football as a significant aspect of working men's culture in the North of England.

Lowry acknowledged that the 16th-century Netherlandish master Pieter Bruegel the Elder had influenced his work, and Lowry's distant, elevated viewpoint evident in this painting has been compared to Bruegel's Procession to Calvary (1564). The painting has been acclaimed as a "Brueghel-like vision of a vanished England" as it "documents an industrial milieu that has all but disappeared", depicting "a moment of colour and joy in the lives of hard-pressed workers".

== History ==
External videos
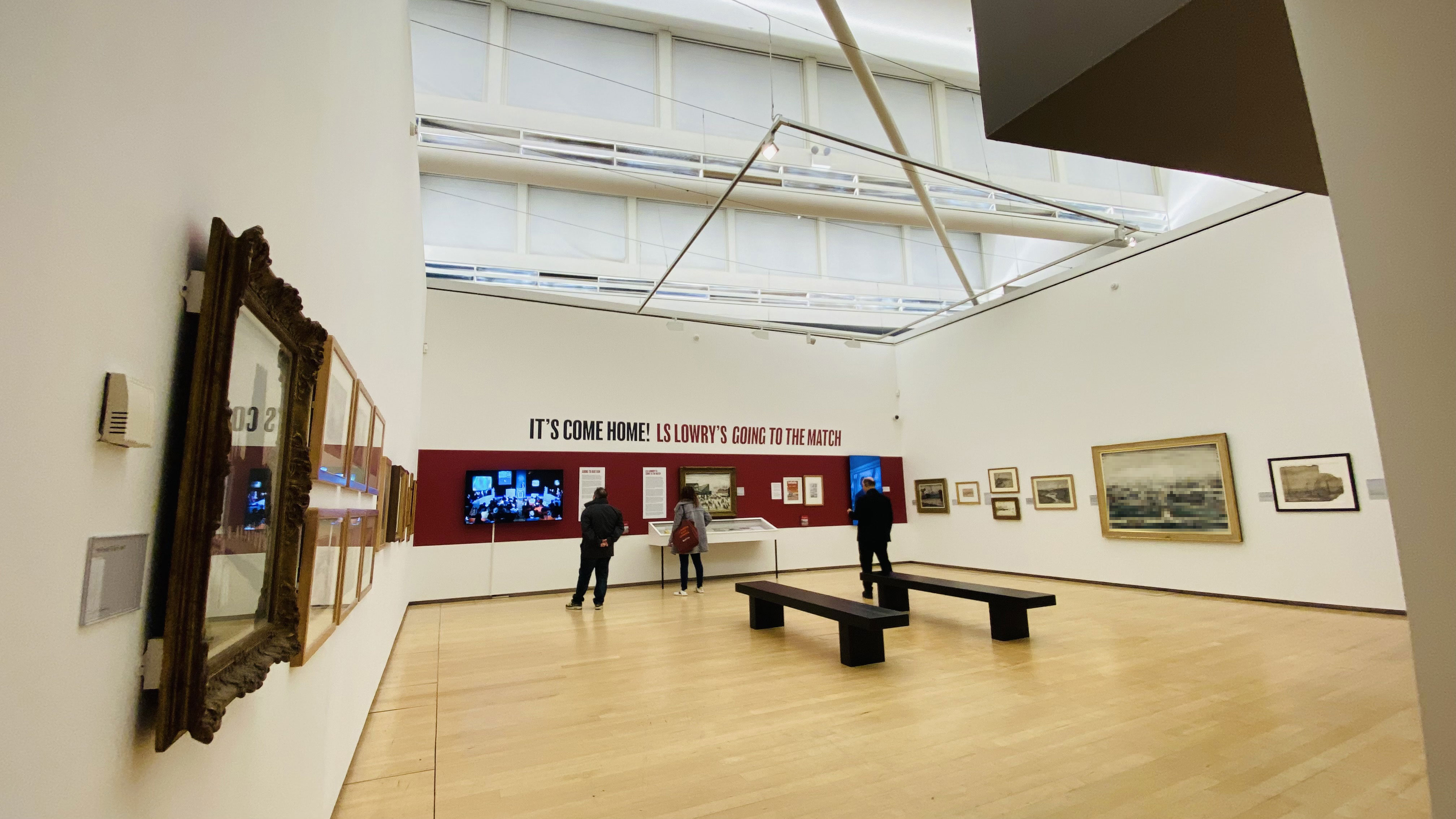
- Video about Lowry's Going to the Match works on display in The Lowry

Going To The Match (1953) was first exhibited at the Lefevre Gallery in October 1953, where it received critical acclaim. In June 1959, the painting was included in a Lowry retrospective exhibition at Manchester City Art Gallery, where critics praised the artist's representation of moving crowds. Writing in The Manchester Guardian, Eric Newton described how "two streams of spectators cross each other diagonally as though they had been drilled by a master of choreography", while a critic in The Times described the figures in the crowds as "almost like comic insects each advancing through different streams [...] most beautifully blended into a single, ever-moving pattern".

In 1999 Going to the Match (1953) was sold at auction at Sotheby's for a record £1,926,500, the highest auction price ever fetched by a modern British artwork at the time. It was bought by the Professional Footballers' Association (PFA), whose chief executive Gordon Taylor has once played for Bolton Wanderers at Burnden Park. Taylor stated, "We were determined to buy it for football because it is quite simply the finest football painting ever." The painting was loaned to Salford Museum and Art Gallery and later moved to public display at The Lowry arts centre in Salford.

In 2022 Going to the Match (1953) was purchased by The Lowry at auction, at Christie's in London, for £7.8 million with financial support from the Law Family charitable foundation. The 1928 painting was valued at between £2 and £3 million in 2021.

Going to the Match (1953) featured in a retrospective exhibition at Tate Britain in 2013. In 2024 the painting will be shown in a touring exhibition which includes Gallery Oldham, the Grundy Art Gallery in Blackpool, the Williamson Art Gallery and Museum in Birkenhead, the National Football Museum in Manchester (for community engagement groups only), and Bury Art Museum.

== See also ==
- Association football culture
