= Shelley Rohde =

British journalist and author (1933–2007)

Gillian Shelley Mary Rohde (17 May 1933 – 6 December 2007) was a British journalist and author. She was best known in North West England as a reporter and presenter on Granada Reports, but she is more widely remembered as the biographer of the artist L. S. Lowry.

== Early life ==
Rohde was born Gillian Shelley Mary Hall, on 17 May 1933, in Paddington, England, her parents being a scriptwriter father and an actress mother. Shelley took the surname of her mother's second husband, the pilot Douglas Rohde. She was largely brought up by her maternal grandmother, Patricia Reardon.

The path to adulthood led through Nottinghamshire. There had been many schools, and Shelley had contrived to be expelled from some. When she left school at 16, it was with no qualifications, and this was to impart a certain drive to her career.

== Career ==
She secured her first job on the Nottinghamshire Free Press before gravitating to London and joining first The Star and later the Daily Express. The Express sent her to the Soviet Union, where at age 21 she became the first female foreign correspondent in Moscow. From her years in Moscow, not only did she learn Russian, but served as interpreter for the press when the Soviet leaders Nikita Khrushchev and Nikolai Bulganin made their official visit to London in 1956.

Still only a young woman, she was a witness to the events of the Hungarian Revolution of 1956. Her coverage of it is mentioned in James Michener's book The Bridge at Andau, in particular an incident where journalists waiting at the bridge to interview fleeing refugees heard a baby crying. Risking a bullet, Rohde crossed the bridge to help the baby and family to safety.

In the 1960s, she moved north to Manchester as chief feature writer for the Daily Mail and from there joined Granada Television, which gave her scope as a presenter of programmes and commentator of the local scene, chat host and debating chair. She generally treated her interviewees with sympathy and visibly entered into their enthusiasms and quirks.

== L. S. Lowry ==
It was in this setting that she began to investigate the local artist L. S. Lowry and was eventually to become an acknowledged expert on him. Her documentary on him, L.S. Lowry: A Private View, was made after she had interviewed the artist personally, which she did several times during his later life. This was in itself an achievement, given that Lowry was known to be difficult to pin down to an interview appointment and to any clear content and was inclined to amuse himself by making up stories. He first told Rohde he had given up painting long ago, but it was noticed that the paint on a canvas was wet.

She was to write extensively about Lowry, including her book A private view of L.S. Lowry (revised as L.S. Lowry: A Biography), and won the Portico Prize for literary excellence in 2002 with another book, The Lowry Lexicon: An A-Z of L.S. Lowry. However, she was not monomaniacal and went on to do A-Z of Van Gogh.

== Personal life and death ==
Rohde married Donald J Weaver in 1958 and the couple went on to have four children together, but they subsequently divorced. Rohde had three grandchildren.

Before her death she named a selection of three Lowry works that then became the focus of the exhibition Exploding Pictures at the Lowry in Salford, the major holding of the artist's work.

Rohde died on 6 December 2007 aged 74, following a ten-year struggle against cancer.
