= Burnden Park =

Former football stadium in Bolton. UK

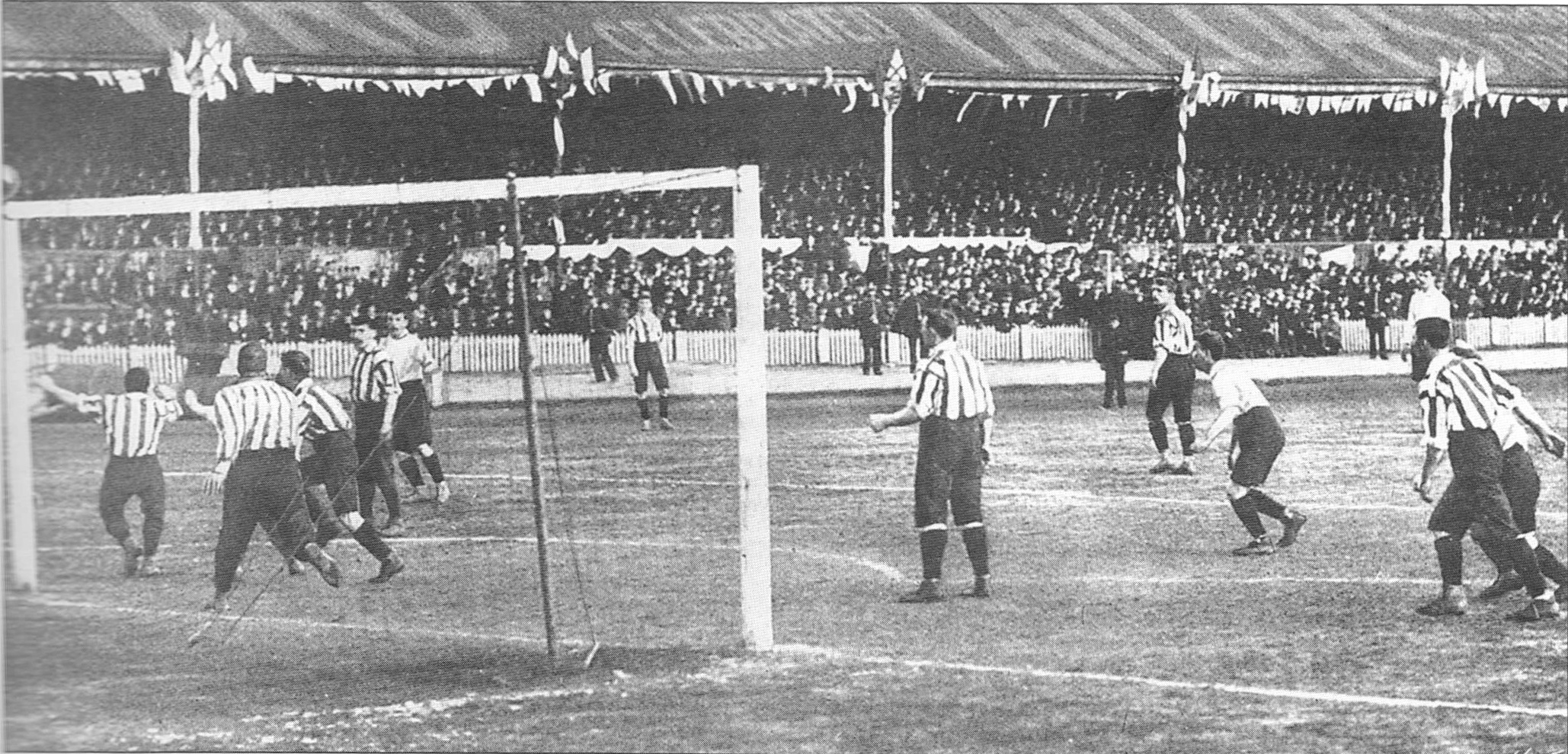
- Burnden Park hosting the 1901 FA Cup final Replay
- Interactive map of Burnden Park
- Location: Burnden, Bolton, Greater Manchester
- Coordinates: 53°34′08″N 2°24′58″W
- Owner: Bolton Wanderers F.C.
- Capacity: 70,000 (maximum); 25,000 (at closing)
- Surface: Grass
- Record attendance: 69,912, 18 February 1933

Construction
- Opened: September 11, 1895
- Closed: April 25, 1997
- Demolished: 1999

Tenant
- Bolton Wanderers F.C. (1895–1997)

Burnden Park was the home of English football club Bolton Wanderers, who played home games there between 1895 and 1997. As well as hosting the 1901 FA Cup final replay, in 1946 it was the scene of one of the worst disasters in English football. The stadium was depicted in a 1953 painting by L. S. Lowry, Going to the Match.

The stadium was demolished in 1999, two years after Bolton moved to Horwich and their new home at what was then called the Reebok Stadium.

== Location ==
Situated on Manchester Road in the Burnden area of Bolton – less than a mile south of the town centre – the ground served as the home of the town's football team for 102 years.

== History ==
Bolton Wanderers was formed in 1874 as Christ Church FC, with the vicar as club president. After disagreements about the use of church premises, the club broke away and became Bolton Wanderers in a 1877 meeting at the Gladstone Hotel. At this time Bolton played at Pike's Lane but needed a purpose built ground to play home matches. As a result, Bolton Wanderers Football and Athletic Club, one of the 12 founder members of the Football League, became a limited company in 1894 and shares were raised to build a ground. Land at Burnden was leased at £130 per annum and £4,000 raised to build the stadium. Burnden Park was completed in August 1895. The opening match was a benefit match against Preston and the first League match was against Everton in front of a 15,000 crowd.

The stadium hosted the replay of the 1901 FA Cup Final, in which Tottenham Hotspur beat Sheffield United 3–1.

The finals of the Rugby Football League's 1986–87 John Player Special Trophy, and 1988–89 John Player Special Trophy tournaments were played at the ground before crowds of 22,144 and 20,709 respectively.

In its heyday, Burnden Park could hold crowds of up to 70,000, but this figure was dramatically reduced during the final 20 years of its life, mainly because of new legislation which saw virtually all English stadia reduce their capacities for safety reasons. A section of the embankment was sold off in 1986 to make way for a new Normid superstore. Bolton's attendances were also falling sharply by the 1980s due to the club's declining fortunes on the pitch.

The club's directors had decided by 1992 that it would be difficult to convert Burnden Park into an all-seater stadium adequate for a club of Bolton's ambition. They were members of the new Division Two (which was known as the Third Division until the creation of the Premier League) but the club wanted to build a stadium to meet these requirements in the event of promotion to Division One and ultimately the Premier League.

The last Wanderers game played at the historic ground was against Charlton Athletic on 25 April 1997. Bolton, who were already promoted as Division One champions, defeated Charlton 4–1 after being 1–0 down at half time. Whites' legend John McGinlay, who scored more than 100 goals in five years with the club, scored the final goal shortly before Bolton received their trophy and the crowd united in singing Auld Lang Syne.

It was decided to build a new multimillion-pound 25,000-seater stadium (later raised to nearly 29,000) – the Reebok Stadium – six miles from Burnden Park at the Middlebrook development. The move took place in 1997, bringing an end to 102 years of football at Burnden Park.

On 20 May 1998, a massive fire swept through the stadium. Neighbours called the fire brigade around 8pm, with the Manchester Road stand well alight by the time they arrived. Initial investigations suggested that the fire may have started on the terraces, with around 60 fire fighters dispatched to tackle the blaze which destroyed the Manchester Road stand, leaving what used to be "home" to thousands of Bolton Wanderers supporters nothing more than a burned-out empty shell.

=== Burnden Park disaster ===
On 9 March 1946, the club's home was the scene of the Burnden Park disaster, which at the time was the worst tragedy in British football history. During an FA Cup quarter-final second leg tie between Bolton and Stoke City, 33 Bolton Wanderers fans were crushed to death, and another 400 injured. There was an estimated 85,000-strong crowd crammed in for the game, which was at least 15,000 more than the ground's capacity. The disaster led to Moelwyn Hughes's official report, which recommended more rigorous control of crowd sizes.

=== Outside football ===
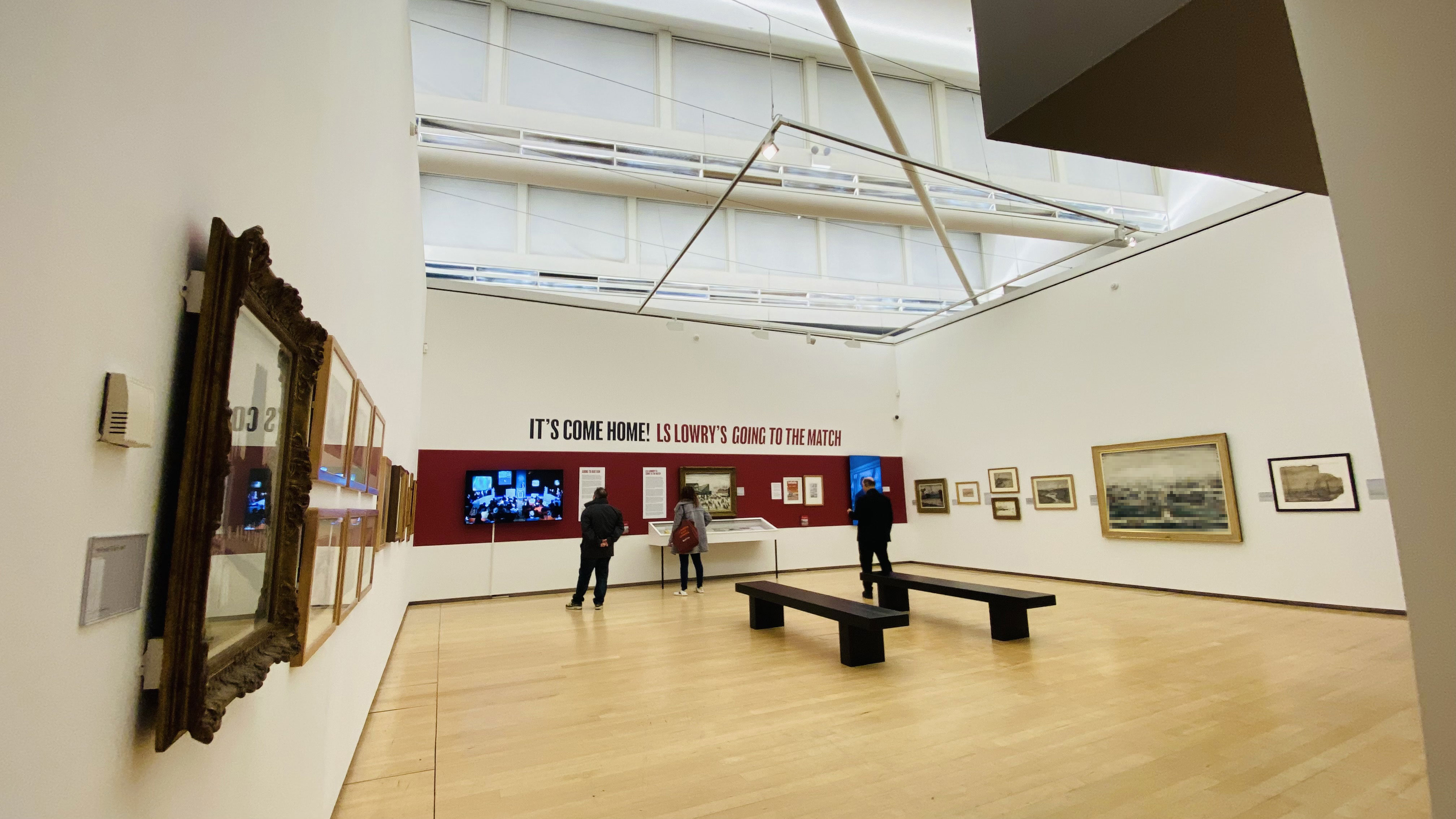
L. S. Lowry's Going to the Match on display at The Lowry arts centre

The railway embankment of Burnden Park was seen in the 1962 film A Kind of Loving, starring Alan Bates and June Ritchie. Part of the Arthur Askey film, The Love Match, was also filmed at Burnden Park in the early 1950s. A painting of Burnden Park in 1953 by L. S. Lowry, Going to the Match, was bought for £1.9 million by the Professional Footballers' Association (PFA) in 1999. It is now in the collection of The Lowry arts centre in Salford.

== Sources ==
- Darby, Paul; Johnes, Martin; Mellor, Gavin (2005), Sport in the global society, Routledge, ISBN 0-7146-4946-5
- Mangan, Tom (1999), Sport in Europe: politics, class, gender, Routledge, ISBN 0-7146-5352-7
