= James Lawrence Isherwood =

English painter (1917–1989)

- Born: James Lawrence Isherwood; 7 April 1917; Wigan, England
- Died: 9 June 1989 (aged 72); Higher End, Wigan, England
- Known for: Painting

James Lawrence Isherwood (1917–1989) was an English artist, born in Wigan, Lancashire. He often painted subject and images (landscapes, seascapes, and portraits) from the Wigan area in a style that became known as 'Wigan style'. His style has been described as Impressionist/Expressionist.

Isherwood was a friend of the artist L. S. Lowry, who purchased his Woman with Black Cat and displayed it at his home.

A BBC documentary, I am Isherwood was made in 1974 about the artist and his work. This was transmitted twice by the BBC, once in 1974 and again in 1975.

Isherwood died in 1989.

== Collections ==
Isherwood's work is represented in the permanent collections of the Hereford Museum and Art Gallery, the Warrington Museum and Art Gallery, the Salford Museum and Art Gallery, among other venues.
