= Dewars Lane =

Alley in Berwick-upon-Tweed, England

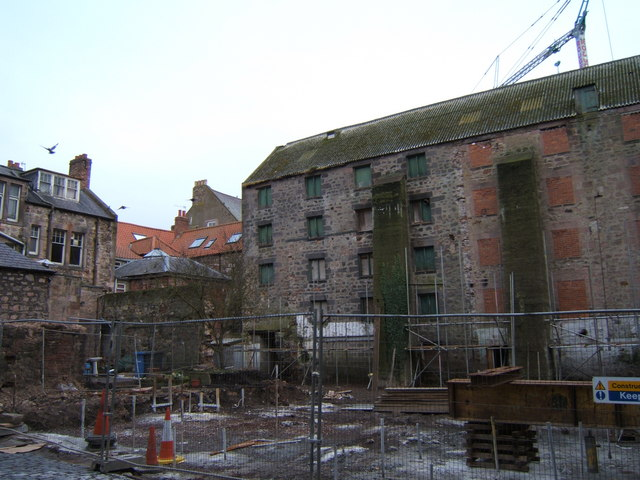
- Dewar's Lane Granary from Sallyport

- Location within Northumberland
- Location: Northumberland, Berwick-upon-Tweed, England
- Coordinates: 55.769°N 2.002°W
- OS grid: NT999528

Dewar's Lane is an alley of medieval origin in the centre of Berwick-upon-Tweed. Over the centuries, heavy cart-wheels have cut deep grooves in its setts.

Once painted by the artist L. S. Lowry, it fell into an extreme state of dilapidation, overrun with pigeons and seagulls. Berwick Preservation Trust then stepped in and created a plan for the renovation of the lane's major building, Dewar's Lane Granary.

The Granary (which is situated on Dewar's Lane) has recently been strapped (as it has a tilt greater than the Leaning Tower Of Pisa) and transformed into a Youth Hostel, Bistro, Major Art Gallery and Public Meeting Rooms. The restored building is not only accessible from street level but also has access from both Berwick's Elizabethan Walls and Historic Quayside. This £5ml renovation will now remove what was considered to be the largest eyesore in the town.
