= Going to the Mill =

1925 oil painting

Going to the Mill is a 1925 oil painting by L. S. Lowry.

Going to the Mill was painted by Lowry in 1925.

It sold at auction at the Mall Galleries in London for £805,200. The price included the buyer's premium. The rear of the painting is marked showing it was priced at £30 (equivalent to £2,161 in 2023) but it was sold to Arthur Wallace, the literary editor of the Manchester Guardian for £10, as Lowry thought it was too expensive. Lowry wrote to Wallace to say that he had charged him too much, and give him an additional painting, The Manufacturing Town, for free. Wallace's family had owned the painting from 1926 until its 2025 sale. They had sold The Manufacturing Town several years previously. Going to the Mill had been on a long term loan from the family to the Pallant House Gallery in Chichester.
