= Mrs Lowry & Son =

- British theatrical release poster
- Directed by: Adrian Noble
- Screenplay by: Martyn Hesford
- Produced by: Debbie Gray
- Starring: Vanessa Redgrave; Timothy Spall
- Cinematography: Josep M. Civit
- Edited by: Chris Gill
- Music by: Craig Armstrong
- Production company: Genesius Pictures
- Distributed by: Vertigo Films
- Release dates: 30 June 2019 (Edinburgh); 30 August 2019 (United Kingdom)
- Running time: 91 minutes
- Country: United Kingdom
- Language: English
- Budget: $1.5 million

Mrs Lowry & Son is a 2019 biographical drama film chronicling the life of the renowned artist L. S. Lowry. It was directed by Adrian Noble from a screenplay written by Martyn Hesford who also wrote the original play, and considers the relationship between Lowry and his mother Elizabeth, who has reservations over her son's career in painting. It stars Vanessa Redgrave and Timothy Spall in the title roles, with Stephen Lord, David Schaal and Wendy Morgan in supporting roles.

The film premiered at the Edinburgh International Film Festival on 30 June 2019. It was released in the UK on 30 August 2019.

== Plot ==
Artist L. S. Lowry lived with his overbearing mother, Elizabeth, until her death in 1939. Bed-ridden and bitter, Elizabeth tries to dissuade her bachelor son from pursuing his artistic ambitions, while never failing to voice her disappointment in him.

== Cast ==
- Vanessa Redgrave as Elizabeth Lowry
  - Rose Noble as Young Elizabeth
- Timothy Spall as L. S. Lowry
  - Laurence Mills as Young Lowry
- Stephen Lord as Mr Stanhope
- Wendy Morgan as Mrs Stanhope
- Michael Keogh as Mr Lowry
- John Alan Roberts as an art critic

== Production ==
=== Development ===
On 12 January 2018, it was announced that Timothy Spall and Vanessa Redgrave would be joining the cast of Mrs. Lowry & Son with Spall playing L. S. Lowry and Redgrave playing his mother, Elizabeth Lowry. Spall previously played J. M. W. Turner, also a famous painter, in the 2014 biographical film Mr. Turner which won him the Cannes Film Festival Award for Best Actor. For his role as L. S. Lowry, Spall stated that, unlike Mr. Turner he did not have to take a refresher course on painting as the film had very little of it. Adrian Noble was also announced to be the film's director, with Martyn Hesford penning the screenplay based on his original stage play which he also wrote. The film was produced by Debbie Gray under the production company Genesius Pictures.

Principal photography began in January, 2018, shooting in various locations around London and areas in Greater Manchester mainly Manchester. Filming wrapped about a month later in Manchester.

=== Music ===
On 29 January 2018, it was announced that English composer Stephen Warbeck would be scoring Mrs Lowry & Son. However, due to reasons unknown, Scottish composer Craig Armstrong took over scoring duties.

== Release ==
Mrs Lowry & Son had its world premiere at the Edinburgh International Film Festival where it was the closing film of the night, on 30 June 2019. The first trailer of the film was released on 27 June 2019. On 17 May 2019, Vertigo Films picked up the rights for distribution in the United Kingdom, and released the film on 30 August 2019.

=== Critical response ===
On the review aggregator website Rotten Tomatoes, Mrs Lowry & Son has a rating of 62% based on 37 reviews, with an average rating of 6.1/10. The website's critical consensus reads, "Mrs Lowry & Son brings a pair of outstanding actors together -- and tests the limits of how much two performances can do to enliven a substandard script." On Metacritic, the film has a weighted average of score of 42 out of 100, based on 10 critics, indicating "mixed reviews".

The film's reception was mixed. Peter Bradshaw of The Guardian singled out Redgrave's portrayal of Elizabeth Lowry as "shrewd and amusingly bleak" and gave it 3 out of 5 stars, but praised the two leads for an "entertaining showcase". Ian Freer of Empire gave Mrs Lowry & Son 2 out of 5 stars, stating that it felt "inert and dismal, hitting the same tonal register for the majority of the running time, never bringing the artist or the art to life."
