= Pat Gerrard Cooke =

English painter and illustrator (1935–2000)

Pat Gerrard Cooke (4 June 1935 – 11 August 2000) was an English painter, illustrator and lifelong friend of artist LS Lowry (1887–1976). She is described as "one of the most commercially successful woman artists" of post-war Britain.

Born in Cheshire, with strong Irish heritage, she was mentored by Lowry from a child. She studied at the Manchester College of Art and the Slade School of Fine Art, London, teaching until 1965 and thereafter working full time as an artist. She relished painting the lives of everyday people: "the street, the pub, the cafe, the back alleys and the courtyards of Europe"; a great appreciator of Liverpudlian street life. She wrote three books and held dozens of sold out exhibitions across the UK and Ireland.

== Early life ==
Pat Gerrard was born on 4 June 1935 in Mottram-in-Longdendale, Cheshire, the daughter of joiner Frank and Lilian Gerrard. Pat had a partly Irish heritage, via her grandmother Mary Veronica Perrin, who had emigrated to Liverpool. Internationally regarded artist L. S. Lowry moved into The Elms, in Mottram in 1948, where he would live for the rest of his life. He began a lifelong friendship with 13-year-old Pat. He advised on her art work and encouraged her to develop her use of oil paints. She said that all her school holidays were filled with creating artworks and she worked as an "itinerant pub artist", from the age of 14, to earn pocket money. This was the time when she began to appreciate everyday local people as her most interesting subject of study.

Lowry advised her: "find out what subjects you like to draw and paint, keep a limited palette, don't be influenced to change your natural style and then work very hard for at least fifty years." When she was 15 and studying at Hyde Grammar School, she painted two portraits of Lowry; one she kept and one was for him. Through her life, she gathered various works by the artist. She recalled her interest in drawing people beginning around the age of three.

Cooke attended Manchester College of Art (1951–1953), where Lowry had also studied, and the Slade School of Fine Art, London. She noted that she had always had a "graphic style" and Slade didn't like it. "They made fun of illustrators", encouraging their students to concentrate on more "important" topics. Throughout her life she focused on achieving solid commercial success, working without any grant funding.

== Career ==
Cooke married writer and atomic engineer Brian Cooke in 1956 and the couple settled in Knutsford. They did not want to have children; "I put my life's blood into paintings – they are my babies", she commented. She taught for nine years at Altrincham Grammar School for Girls. From 1965, she concentrated solely on her artwork, exhibiting her work across the Uk and Ireland. Cooke and her husband travelled widely in pursuit of subjects. She noted "I want people in Bickershaw to know how people enjoy themselves in Moscow". They travelled through Ireland with Lowry on at least five trips, from 1962 to 1970. They also travelled together in Sunderland. In 1998, she published the memoir Mr Lowry's Clown.

Cooke said she liked to work stretched out on the floor, lying on her stomach, and expressed dislike for working on an easel. She worked at home and did not have a workshop, stating "my house is my workshop". She thought of herself as an illustrator, an observer, "a recorder of the social scene", and loved "people watching". She was strongly influenced by Georgian painter of people Thomas Rowlandson (1757–1827) who was also an observer and illustrator of daily life. She attributes the wisest guidance she received as that from Lowry, who advised that one has to make a living as well as to paint. She suffered from eye strain caused by the many hours of close attention she gave her paintings, working from 9–5 each day in a disciplined manner. When preparing for an exhibition she would often work through the night. She commented that being a professional artist required stamina and strength. She was proud of her Irish heritage and enjoyed spending time with the strong Irish communities in Liverpool. The Guardian wrote of her: "Pat's inspiration is the street, the pub, the cafe, the back alleys and the courtyards of Europe. She listens before she sketches." The newspaper compared her approach to that of Irish writer James Joyce: a shrewd observer of the small details and inflections of common, everyday life. She asked "how can an artist lock himself away with all this happening outside and sit there painting flowers and abstracts and things?".

Cooke was described as "one of the most commercially successful woman artists" in Britain in the post-war period. Most of her work hung in private homes during her lifetime, a fact she loved. Her work hung in the National Gallery of Ireland. By the early 1970s she had had 13 exhibitions, all of which had sold out, including two at the Andsell Gallery, London. She was invited by the James Joyce Foundation to exhibit in Dublin a series of Ulysses illustrations. She noted that she was "scoffed at by a lot of painters because people understand my work and buy and customers who commission me say 'do it mainly in black and magenta, Pat luv, because the wife's bought this new carpet and it's for the same room'. I don't curl my lip. Who am I to say it's got to be green? I'm a grocer, a journeyman." Lowry bought her work with enthusiasm. She enjoyed the fact that her mentor's art was owned by mill workers who just enjoyed the pictures of lives they recognised, regardless of art fashion or investment possibilities. Alongside her memoir, she wrote two books on the history of dress.

Cooke died in 2000 at the age of 65. Her funeral took place at Altrincham Crematorium.
