= Industrial Landscape =

Painting by L. S. Lowry

- Industrial Landscape (1955) in the Tate Modern
- Artist: L. S. Lowry
- Year: 1934-55
- Medium: Oil on canvas
- Movement: Naïve art
- Dimensions: 144 cm × 152 cm (57 in × 60 in)
- Location: Tate Modern; London, Salford

Industrial Landscape is the title given to each of a series of oil paintings by the English artist L. S. Lowry, painted over a number of years between 1934 and 1955.

Each picture is in the form of a landscape painting, in which the traditional elements of natural beauty have been supplanted with factories, chimneys, bridges and other elements of an industrial city environment.

One of the most noted Industrial Landscape pieces is a 1955 painting in the Tate Gallery in London; other paintings of the same title are held in the collections of several galleries around the United Kingdom, such as The Lowry in Salford, while others are in private collections.

== Background ==
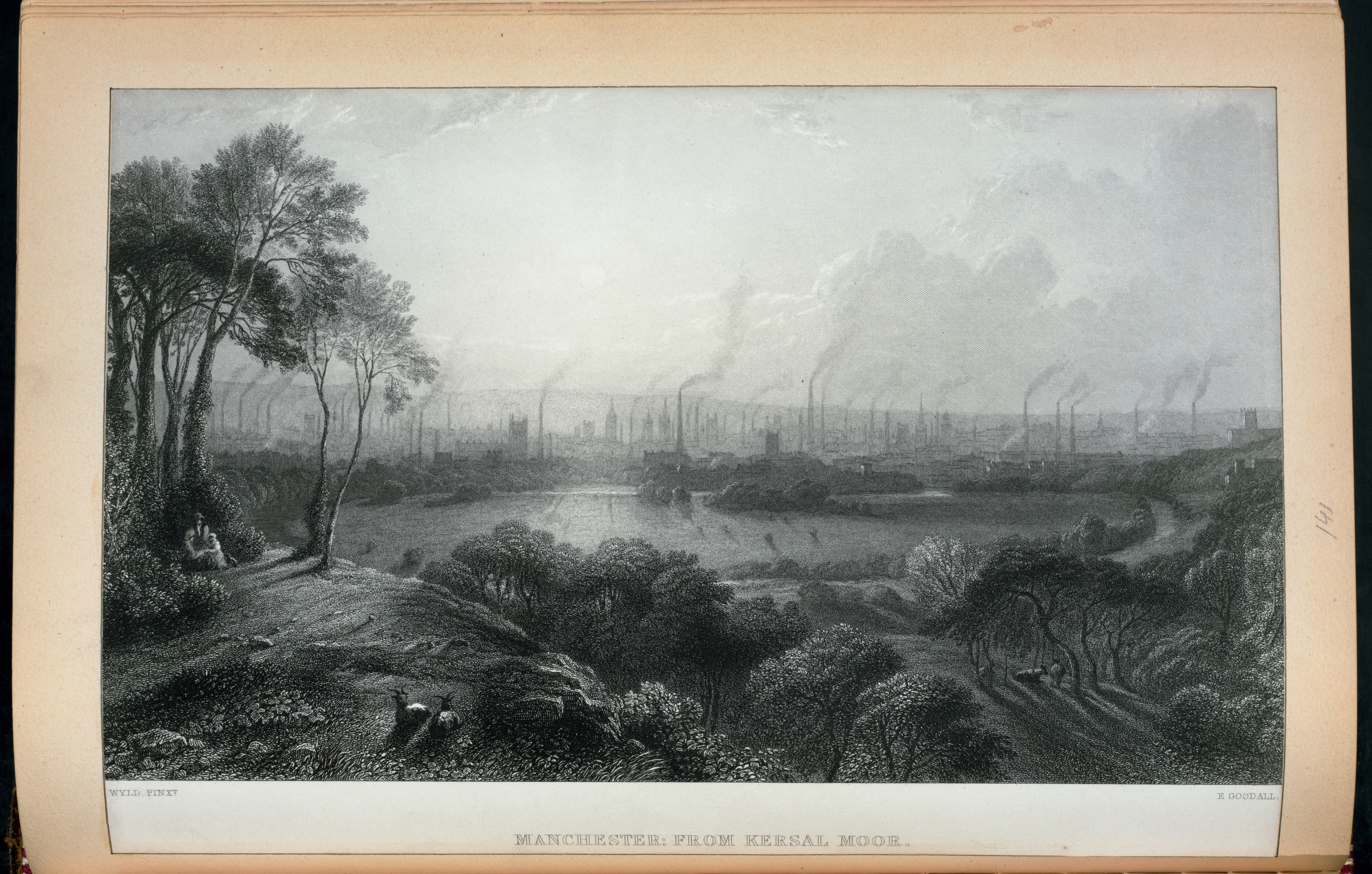
1880 engraving of the view over Manchester from Kersal Moor, near Pendlebury, Salford, depicting a dense array of smoking factory chimneys (Thomas Addis Emmet, after William Wyld, 1857)

L.S. Lowry was born in 1887 in Stretford, Lancashire. After spending much of his childhood in the leafy suburb of Victoria Park, Manchester, his family moved to the industrial town of Pendlebury in Salford. Initially, Lowry detested the landscape of textile mills and factory chimneys rather than trees, but later grew to appreciate its beauty. He recalled a moment of revelation after missing a train at Pendlebury railway station: "As I left the station I saw the Acme Spinning Company's mill... The huge black framework of rows of yellow-lit windows standing up against the sad, damp charged afternoon sky. The mill was turning out... I watched this scene — which I'd looked at many times without seeing — with rapture..."

Lowry's art was shaped by his observations of the northern urban environment. A large part of the body of his work was focussed on representing scenes of industrial decay and urban deprivation in the North of England, and many of his landscapes consisted of bleak evocations of the industrial areas close to his home town of Pendlebury. The Manchester Guardian newspaper, a frequent supporter of Lowry's work, commented in 1954 that Lowry "has opened our eyes to the harsh, wry poetry of the Lancashire industrial landscape".

Lowry said of his interpretation of these scenes, "I saw the industrial scene and I was affected by it. I tried to paint it all the time. I tried to paint the industrial scene as best I could. It wasn't easy. Well, a camera could have done the scene straight off."

== Industrial Landscape (1953) ==
Lowry's 1953 Industrial Landscape (collection of The Lowry)

Lowry's 1953 painting, Industrial Landscape hangs in The Lowry in Salford. The oil on canvas measures 45 by 60 cm (18 by 24 in) and depicts a wide, bleak urban panorama of smoking factory chimneys, roads, bridges, gasometers, terraced houses and churches. At the centre of the canvas, a street emerges from the distance, punctuated with tiny human figures, and in the foreground, a statue stands on top of a hillock. It is signed in the bottom-right-hand corner "L.S.LOWRY 1953" Industrial Landscape (1953) was purchased from the Lefevre Gallery in 1988 by Salford Museum and Art Gallery with support from the Victoria and Albert Museum Purchase Grant Fund, the National Heritage Memorial Fund and the National Art Collections Fund.

== Industrial Landscape (1955) ==
Lowry's 1955 painting of the same title similarly presents a panoramic cityscape dotted with factories, tall smoking chimneys, roads, bridges and industrial wasteland. The setting is one of Lowrys' "composite townscapes", made up from a variety of elements from an industrial city. In the foreground are rows of terraced houses which form a street pointing into the distance to a vanishing point. The 1955 oil on canvas measures 144 by 152 cm (57 by 60 in) and is signed in the bottom-right corner "L.S.LOWRY 1955". A small number of human figures can be seen milling around in the foreground, but the emphasis is on the visual impact of the landscape itself.

Writing in October 1956, Lowry stated, "The picture is of no particular place. When I started it on the plain canvas I hadn't the slightest idea as to what sort of Industrial Scene would result. But by making a start by putting say a Church or Chimney near the middle this picture seemed to come bit by bit". Certain elements in the picture may be identified as real locations, such as the Stockport Viaduct, a frequent motif in Lowry's work, which stretches across the distance on the left of the canvas, with a small train crossing over. Lowry incorporated this bridge in many of his composite paintings (cf. The Pond, 1950); "As I make them up, I suddenly know I must bring in the Stockport Viaduct... I love it... It is part of my life, a dream." The 1955 painting has been described as a "dreamscape", an accomplished composition of elements of the industrial "apocalypse of grime" that haunted Lowry's imagination.

Industrial Landscape (1955) was purchased from Lowry by the Trustees of the Chantrey Bequest and presented to the Tate Gallery in 1956.

== Elements depicted ==
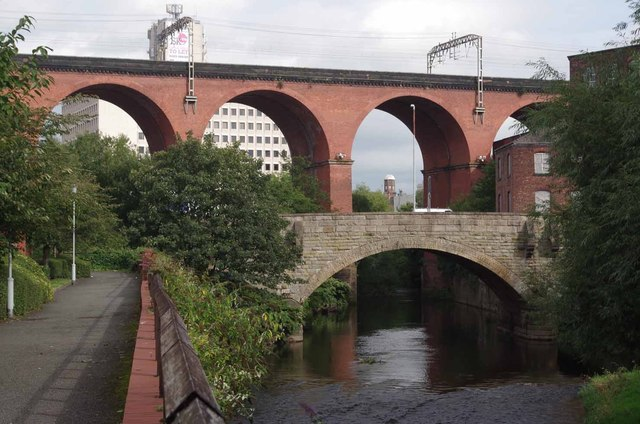
The Stockport Viaduct which crosses Stockport town centre is a recognisable feature in many of Lowry's paintings

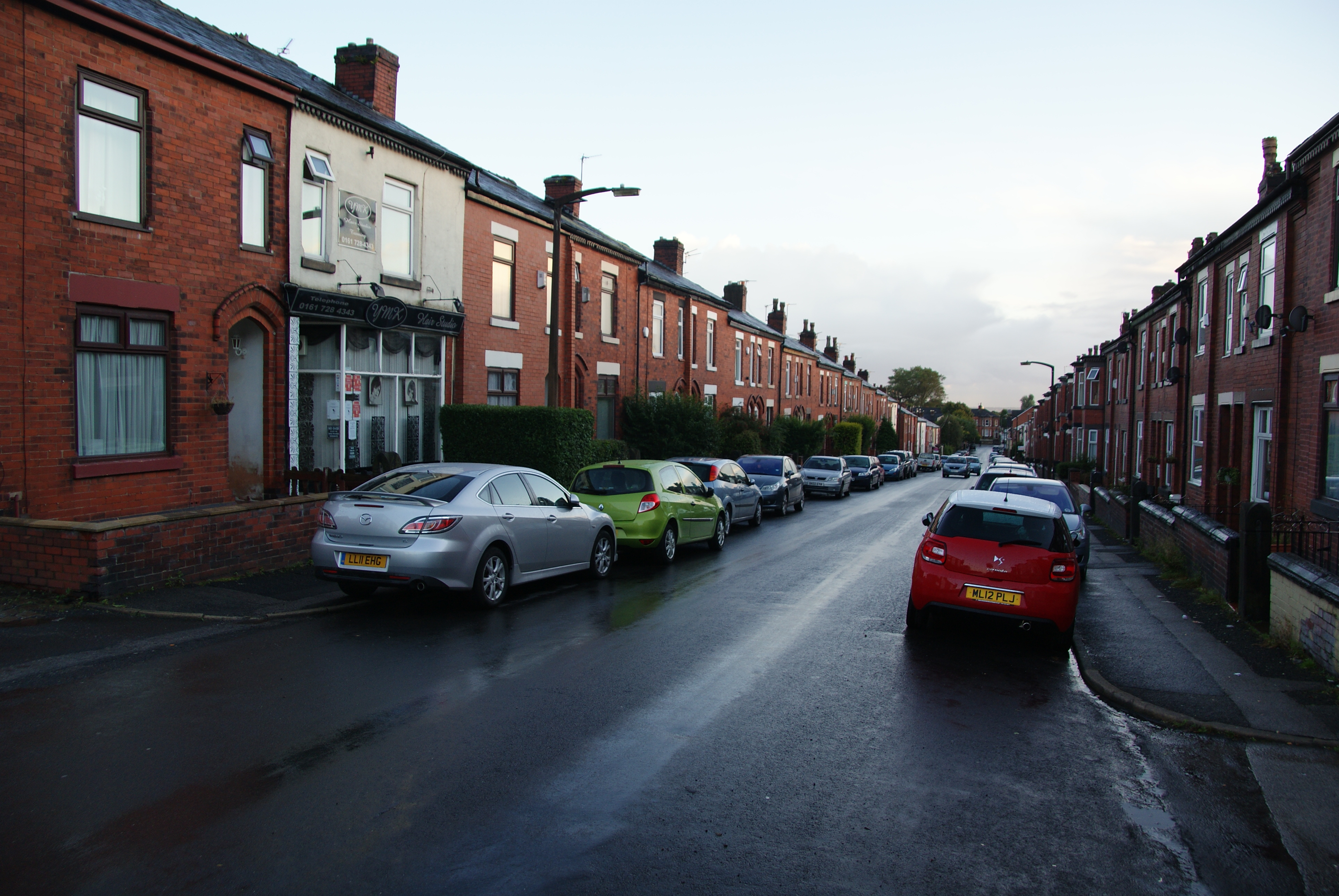
Terraced houses, a typical feature of Lancashire towns, feature in Lowry's Industrial Landscape paintings

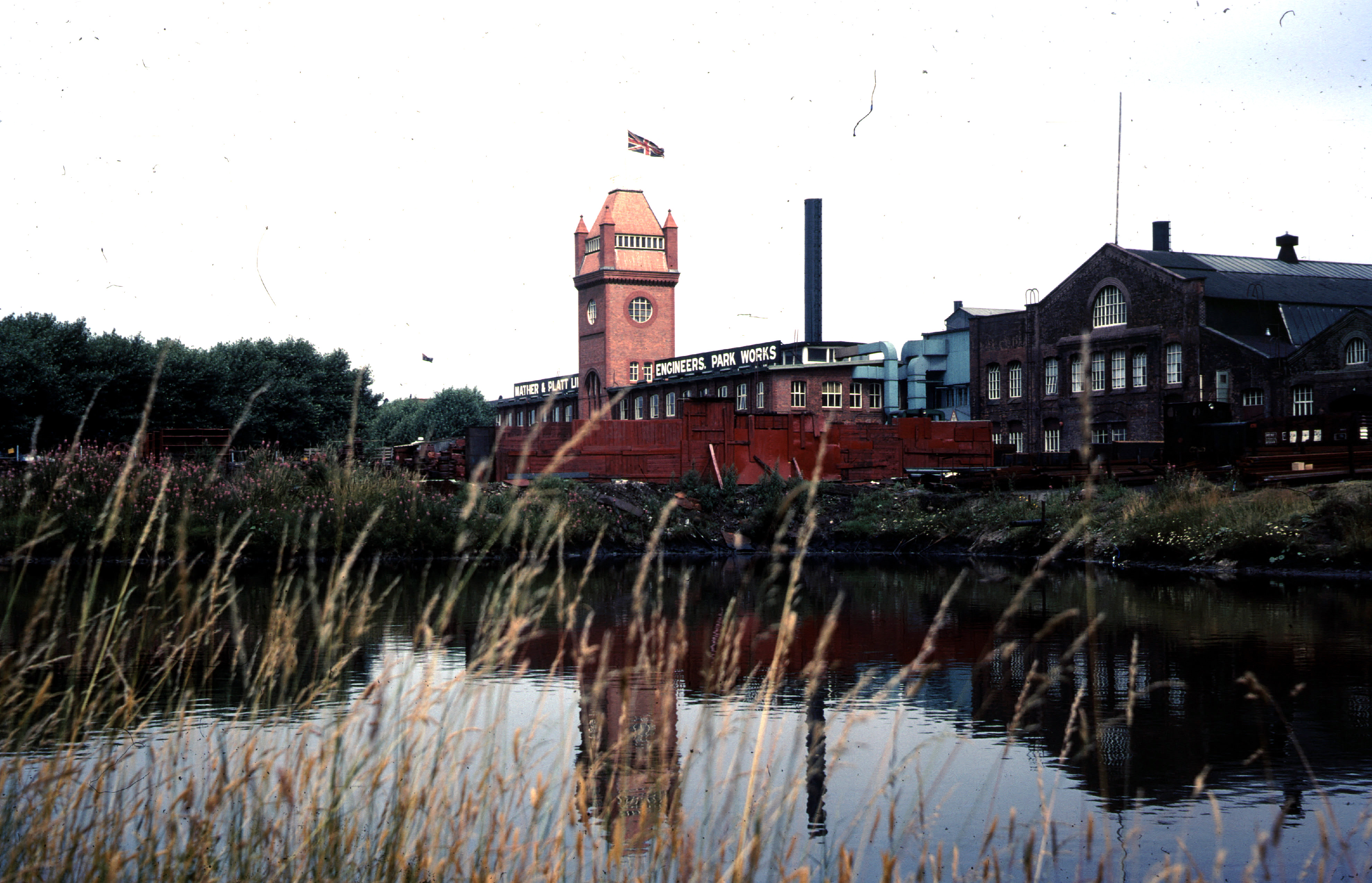
Industrial buildings such as the Mather & Platt engineering works are represented

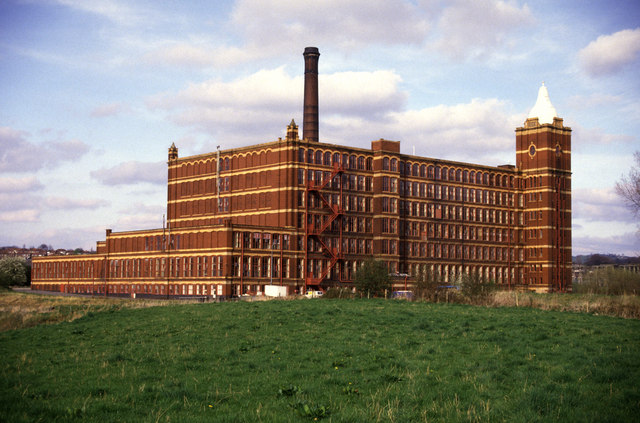
Factory chimneys, a typical feature of Northern English towns, are prominent

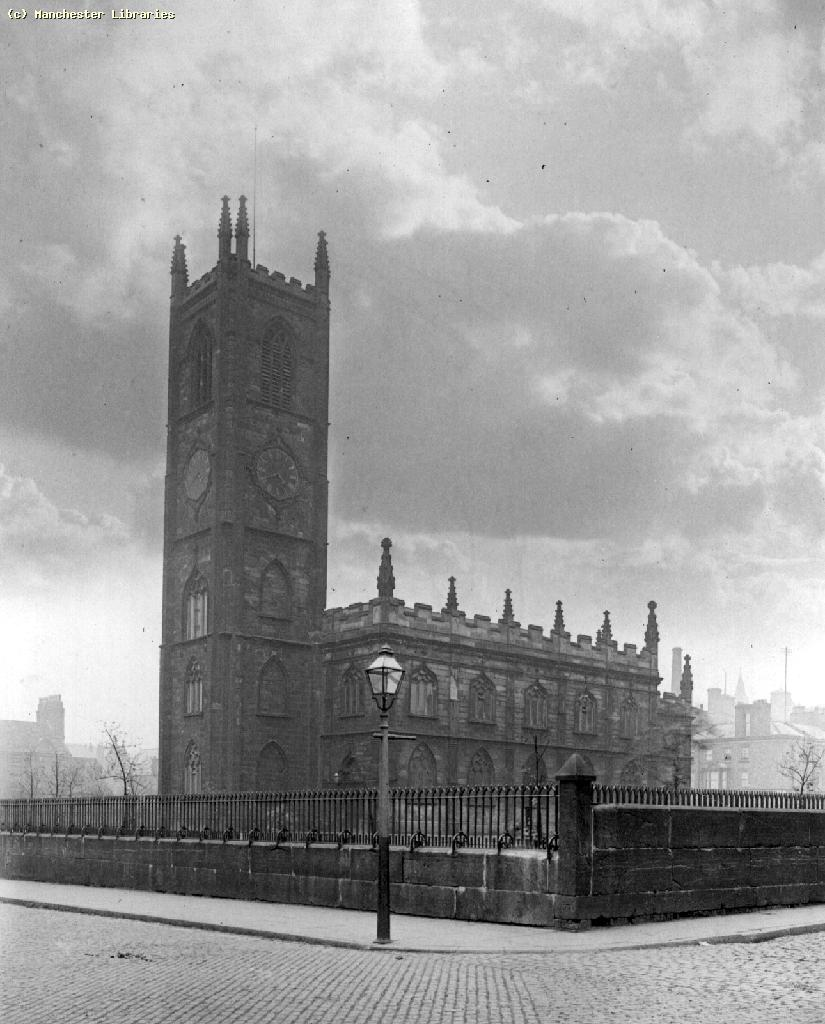
Churches with stonework blackened by pollution were a common sight

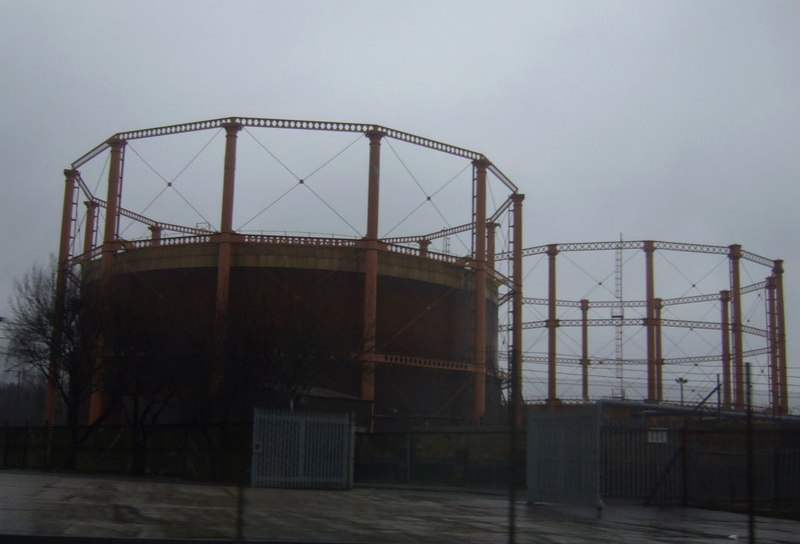
Gasometers are also seen in Lowry's paintings

== Other Industrial Landscape paintings ==
Landscape scenes of industrial decay were one of Lowry's favoured themes, and several other works by Lowry bear the Industrial Landscape title, among them:

- Industrial Landscape (1934), pencil on paper, The Higgins Art Gallery & Museum, Bedford
- Industrial Landscape (1931), oil on canvas, private collection
- River Scene or Industrial Landscape (1935), oil on canvas, Laing Art Gallery, Newcastle upon Tyne
- Industrial Landscape – The Canal (1945), oil on canvas, Leeds Art Gallery, Leeds
- Industrial Landscape: River Scene (1950), oil on canvas, Leicester Museum & Art Gallery, Leicester
- Industrial Landscape (Ashton-under Lyne) (1952), oil on canvas, Cartwright Hall, Bradford
- Industrial Landscape (1952 or 1955), watercolour, Manchester Art Gallery, Manchester
