= L. S. Lowry =

British visual artist (1887–1976)

L. S. Lowry RBA RA
- Lowry at work
- Born: Laurence Stephen Lowry; 1 November 1887; Stretford, Lancashire, England
- Died: 23 February 1976 (aged 88); Glossop, Derbyshire, England
- Education: Manchester Municipal College; Salford Technical College
- Known for: Painting
- Notable work: Coming from the Mill (1930); Going to Work (1943); Going to the Match (1953); Industrial Landscape (1955); Portrait of Ann (1957); Man Lying on a Wall (1957)
- Awards: Freedom of the City of Salford; Honorary Master of Arts; Honorary Doctor of Letters

Laurence Stephen Lowry RBA RA (/ˈlaʊri/ LAO-ree; 1 November 1887 – 23 February 1976) was an English artist. His drawings and paintings often depict scenes of life in the industrial districts of North West England in the mid-20th century. He developed a distinctive style of painting and is best known for his urban landscapes peopled with human figures, often referred to as "matchstick men". He also painted mysterious unpopulated landscapes, brooding portraits and the unpublished "marionette" works, which were only found after his death. He was fascinated by the sea, and painted pure seascapes, depicting only sea and sky, from the early 1940s.

His use of stylised figures which cast no shadows, and lack of weather effects in many of his landscapes led critics to label him a naïve "Sunday painter".

Lowry holds the record for rejecting British honours—five, including a knighthood (1968). A collection of his work is on display in The Lowry, a purpose-built art gallery on Salford Quays. On 26 June 2013, a major retrospective opened at the Tate Britain in London, his first at the gallery; in 2014 his first solo exhibition outside the UK was held in Nanjing, China.

== Early life ==
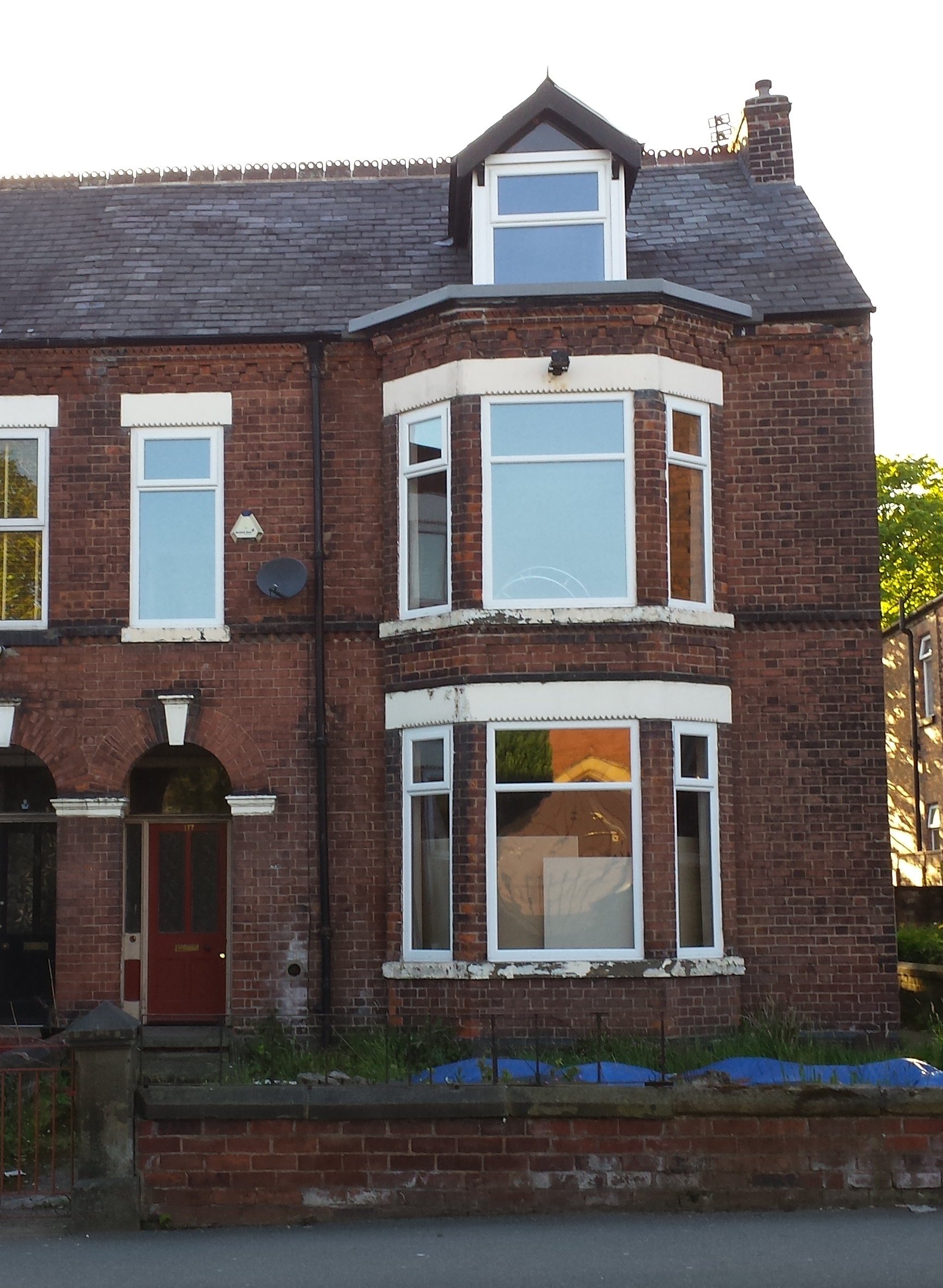
Lowry's former home, 117 Station Road, Pendlebury, Lancashire

Lowry was born on 1 November 1887 at 8 Barrett Street, Stretford, which was then in Lancashire.His birth was a difficult one, and his mother Elizabeth, who hoped for a girl, was uncomfortable even looking at him initially. Later, she expressed envy of her sister Mary, who had "three splendid daughters" instead of one "clumsy boy". Lowry's grandfather Frederick Lowry had emigrated as a boy from Ulster in 1826 and finally settled in Manchester; he built up a career as an estate agent. His father Robert worked as a clerk for the Jacob Earnshaw and Son Property Company and was a withdrawn and introverted man. Lowry once described him as a "cold fish [...] a queer chap in many ways [...] nothing moved him. Nothing upset him. Nothing pleased him. It was as if he had got a life to get through and he got through it".

After Lowry's birth, his mother's health was too poor for her to continue teaching. She is reported to have been a religious woman who was talented and respected, with aspirations of becoming a concert pianist. She was also an irritable, nervous woman brought up to expect high standards by her stern father. Like him, she was controlling and intolerant of failure. She used illness as a means of securing the attention and obedience of her mild and affectionate husband and she dominated her son in the same way. Lowry maintained that he had an unhappy childhood, growing up in a repressive family atmosphere. Although his mother demonstrated no appreciation of her son's gifts as an artist, a number of books Lowry received as Christmas presents from his parents are inscribed to "Our dearest Laurie". At school he made few friends and showed no academic aptitude. His father was affectionate towards him but was, by all accounts, a quiet man who was at his most comfortable fading into the background as an unobtrusive presence.

Much of Lowry's early years were spent in the Manchester suburb of Victoria Park, Rusholme, but in 1909, when he was 22, owing to financial pressures, the family moved to 117 Station Road in the industrial town of Pendlebury. Here the landscape comprised textile mills and factory chimneys rather than trees. Lowry later recalled: "At first I detested it, and then, after years I got pretty interested in it, then obsessed by it ... One day I missed a train from Pendlebury – [a place] I had ignored for seven years – and as I left the station I saw the Acme Spinning Company's mill ... The huge black framework of rows of yellow-lit windows standing up against the sad, damp charged afternoon sky. The mill was turning out ... I watched this scene — which I'd looked at many times without seeing — with rapture ..."

== Education ==
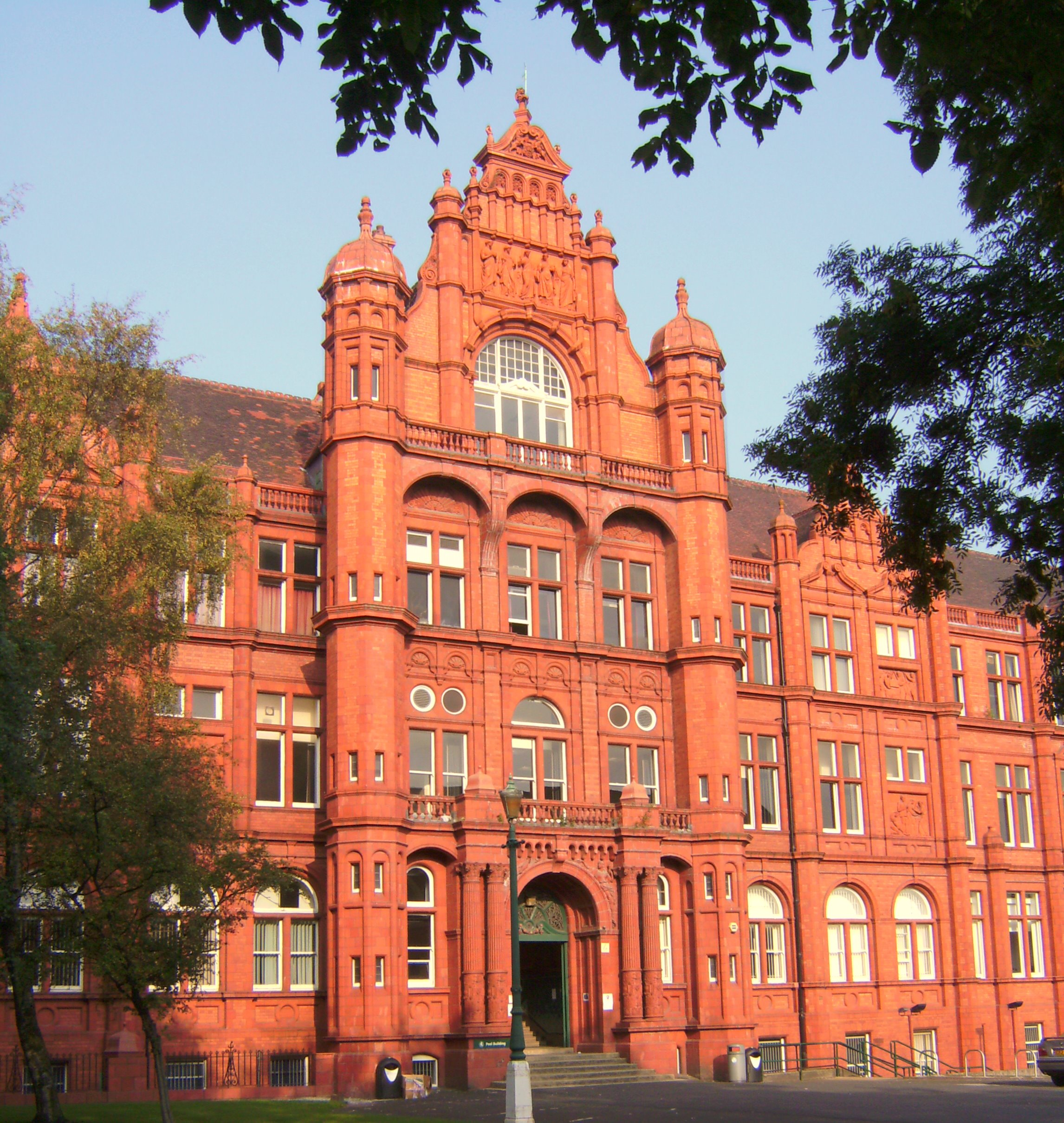
The Peel Building, where Lowry studied at the Royal Technical College, Salford. It overlooks Peel Park, the subject of a number of his paintings. His pencil drawing "A View from the window of the Royal Technical College, Salford" (1924) was drawn from the balconied window on the upper floor.

After leaving school, Lowry began a career working for the Pall Mall Company, later collecting rents, he would spend some time in his lunch hour at Buile Hill Park and in the evenings took private art lessons in antique and freehand drawing. In 1905, he secured a place at the Manchester School of Art, where he studied under the French Impressionist, Pierre Adolphe Valette. Lowry was full of praise for Valette as a teacher, remarking "I cannot over-estimate the effect on me of the coming into this drab city of Adolphe Valette, full of French impressionists, aware of everything that was going on in Paris". In 1915 he moved on to the Royal Technical Institute, Salford (later to become the Royal Technical College, Salford and now the University of Salford) where his studies continued until 1925. There he developed an interest in industrial landscapes and began to establish his own style. There is no record of him serving in the First World War. After the introduction of conscription he underwent a medical examination at Bury Barracks on 10 April 1916 and was categorised as unfit for active service due to having flat feet.

Lowry's oil paintings were originally impressionistic and dark in tone but D. B. Taylor of the Manchester Guardian took an interest in his work and encouraged him to move away from the sombre palette he was using. Taking this advice on board, Lowry began to use a white background to lighten the pictures. He developed a distinctive style of painting and is best known for his urban landscapes peopled with human figures, often referred to as "matchstick men". According to art critic Simon Hucker, "he [Lowry] is much more sophisticated than that… This idea that he's a naive painter who can't paint any better … god, he can paint, he's a proper impressionist. These people are not caricatures – he can give you the impression of a man with a couple of strokes at the brush. In these little tiny figures you get a lot of story, and that’s his genius." He also painted mysterious unpopulated landscapes, brooding portraits and the unpublished "marionette" works, which were only found after his death.

== Death of his parents ==
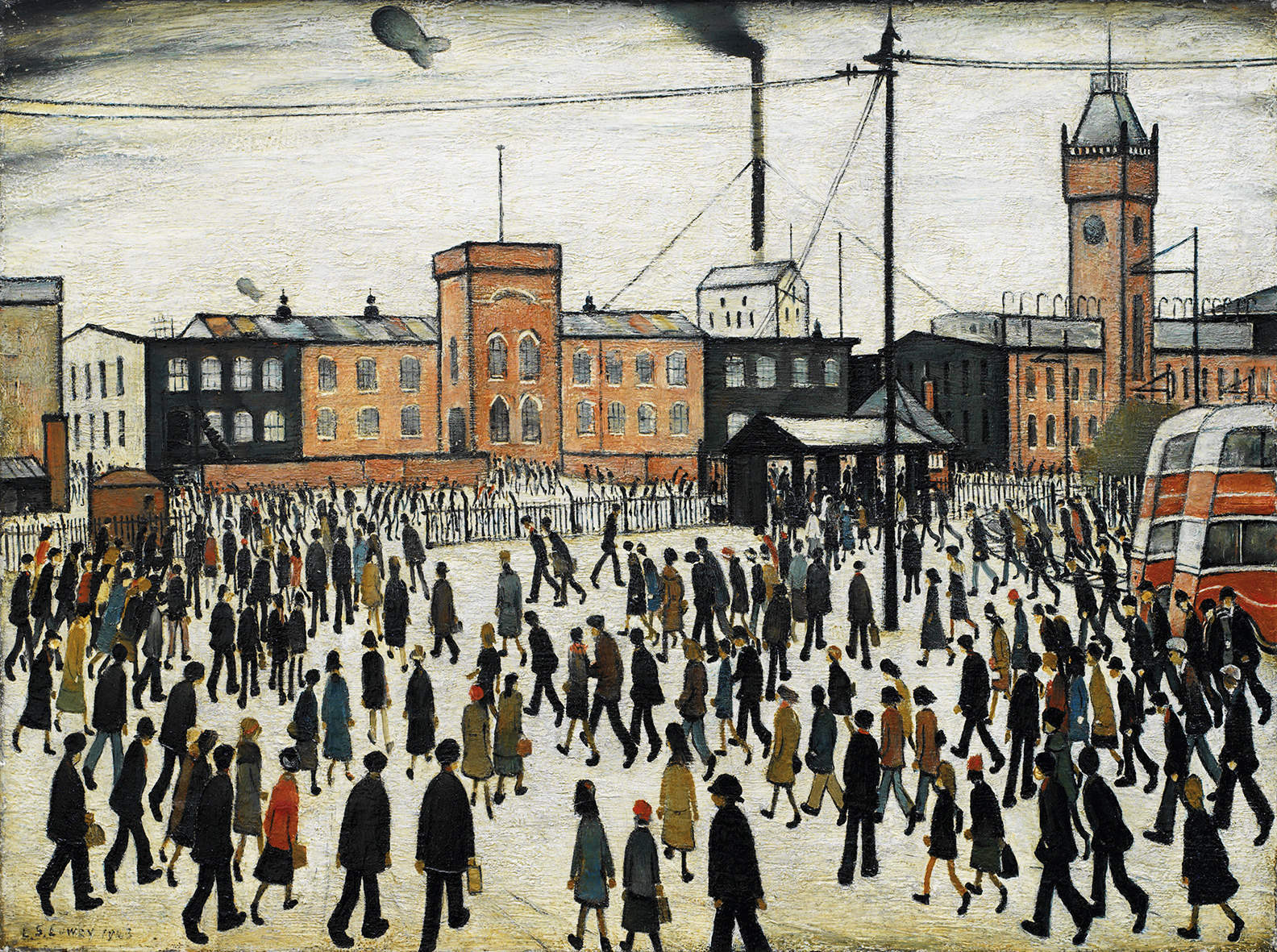
Going to Work (1943), commissioned by the War Artists' Advisory Committee

His father died in 1932, leaving debts. His mother, subject to neurosis and depression, became bedridden and dependent on her son for care. Lowry painted after his mother had fallen asleep, between 10:00 p.m. and 2:00 or 3:00 a.m. Many paintings produced during this period were damning self-portraits (often referred to as the "Horrible Heads" series), which demonstrate the influence of expressionism and may have been inspired by an exhibition of Vincent van Gogh's work at Manchester Art Gallery in 1931. He expressed regret that he received little recognition as an artist until his mother died (1939) and that she was not able to enjoy his success. From the mid-1930s until at least 1939, Lowry took annual holidays at Berwick-upon-Tweed. After the outbreak of the Second World War Lowry served as a volunteer fire watcher and became an official war artist in 1943. In 1953, he was appointed Official Artist at the Coronation of Queen Elizabeth II. After his mother's death in October 1939, he became depressed and neglected the upkeep of his house to such a degree that the landlord repossessed it in 1948. He was not short of money and bought "The Elms" in Mottram in Longdendale then in Cheshire. The area was much more rural but Lowry professed to dislike both the house and the area:

They're nice folk, I've nothing against them, it's the place never could take to it. I can't explain it. I've often wondered...It does nothing for me. I know there's plenty to paint here but I haven't the slightest desire to work locally. I've done one painting of the local agricultural show. Was commissioned to paint the parish church but had to give it up, I couldn't do it.

Although he considered the house ugly and uncomfortable, it was spacious enough both to set up his studio in the dining room and to accommodate the collection of china and clocks that he had inherited from his mother; he stayed there until his death almost 30 years later.

== Personal life ==
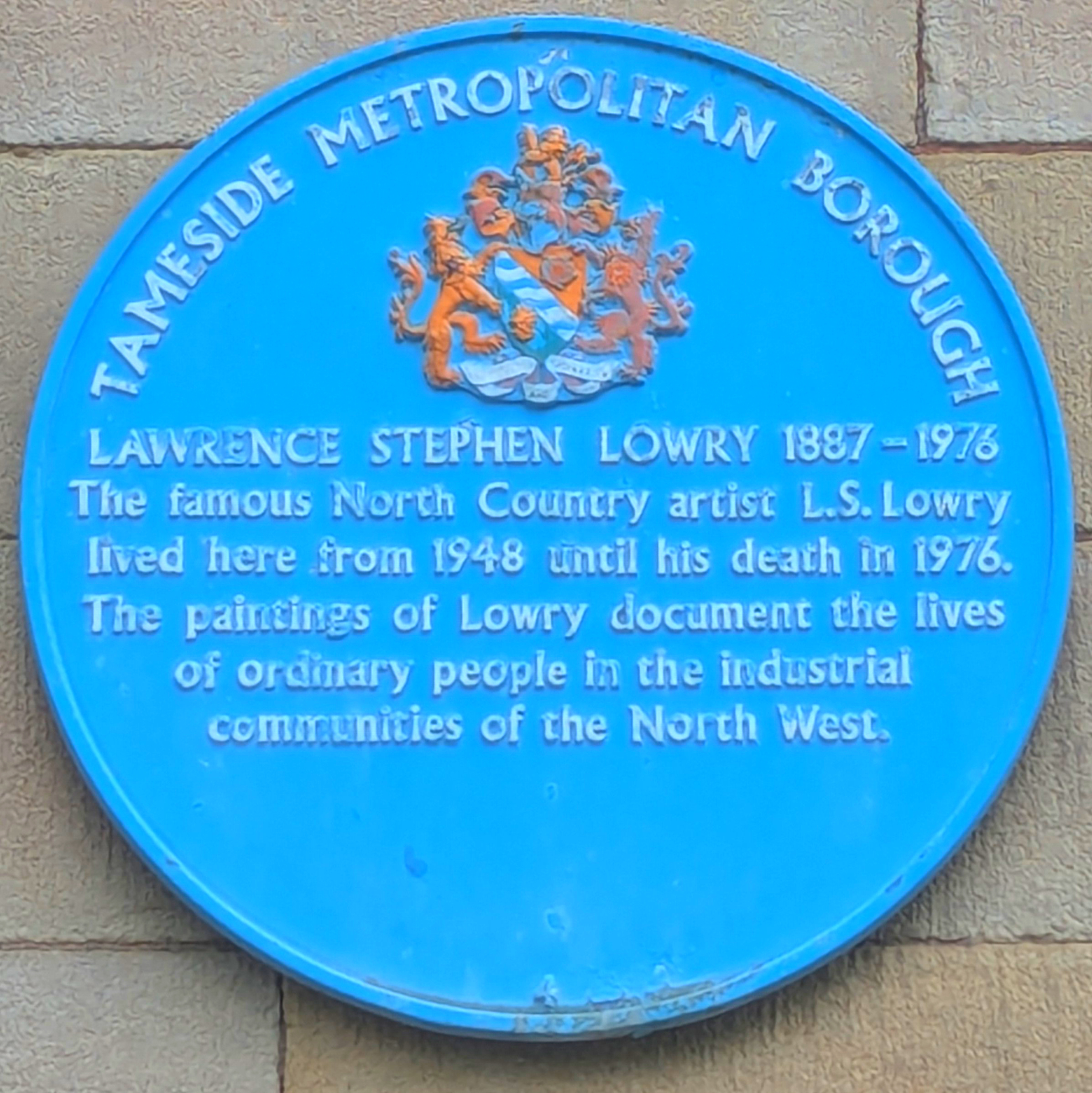
A blue plaque in Mottram in Longdendale where Lowry lived, commemorating his work

In later years, Lowry spent holidays at the Seaburn Hotel in Sunderland, painting scenes of the beach and nearby ports and coal mines. When he had no sketchbook, Lowry drew scenes in pencil or charcoal on the back of envelopes, paper napkins and cloakroom tickets and presented them to young people sitting with their families. Such serendipitous pieces are now worth thousands of pounds.

He was a secretive and mischievous man who enjoyed stories irrespective of their truth. His friends observed that his anecdotes were more notable for humour than accuracy and in many cases he set out deliberately to deceive. His stories about the fictional Ann were inconsistent and he invented other people as frameworks on which to hang his tales. The collection of clocks in his living room were all set at different times: to some people, he said that this was because he did not want to know the real time; to others, he claimed that it was to save him from being deafened by their simultaneous chimes. The owner of an art gallery in Manchester who visited him at his home, The Elms, noted that while his armchair was sagging and the carpet frayed, Lowry was surrounded by items such as his beloved Rossetti drawing, Proserpine, as well as a Lucian Freud drawing located between two Tompion clocks.

Lowry had many long-lasting friendships, including the Salford artist Harold Riley and painter Pat Gerrard Cooke (1935 – 2000). He made new friends throughout his adult life. He bought works from young artists he admired, such as James Lawrence Isherwood, whose Woman with Black Cat hung on his studio wall. He was friends with some of these artists; he befriended the 23-year-old Cumberland artist Sheila Fell in November 1955, describing her as "the finest landscape artist of the mid-20th century". He supported Fell's career by buying several pictures that he gave to museums. Fell later described him as "A great humanist. To be a humanist, one has first to love human beings, and to be a great humanist, one has to be slightly detached from them". As he never married, this affected his influence but he did have several female friends. At the age of 88 he said that he had "never had a woman". Although seen as a mostly solitary and private person, Lowry enjoyed attending football matches and was an ardent supporter of Manchester City F.C.

== Retirement ==
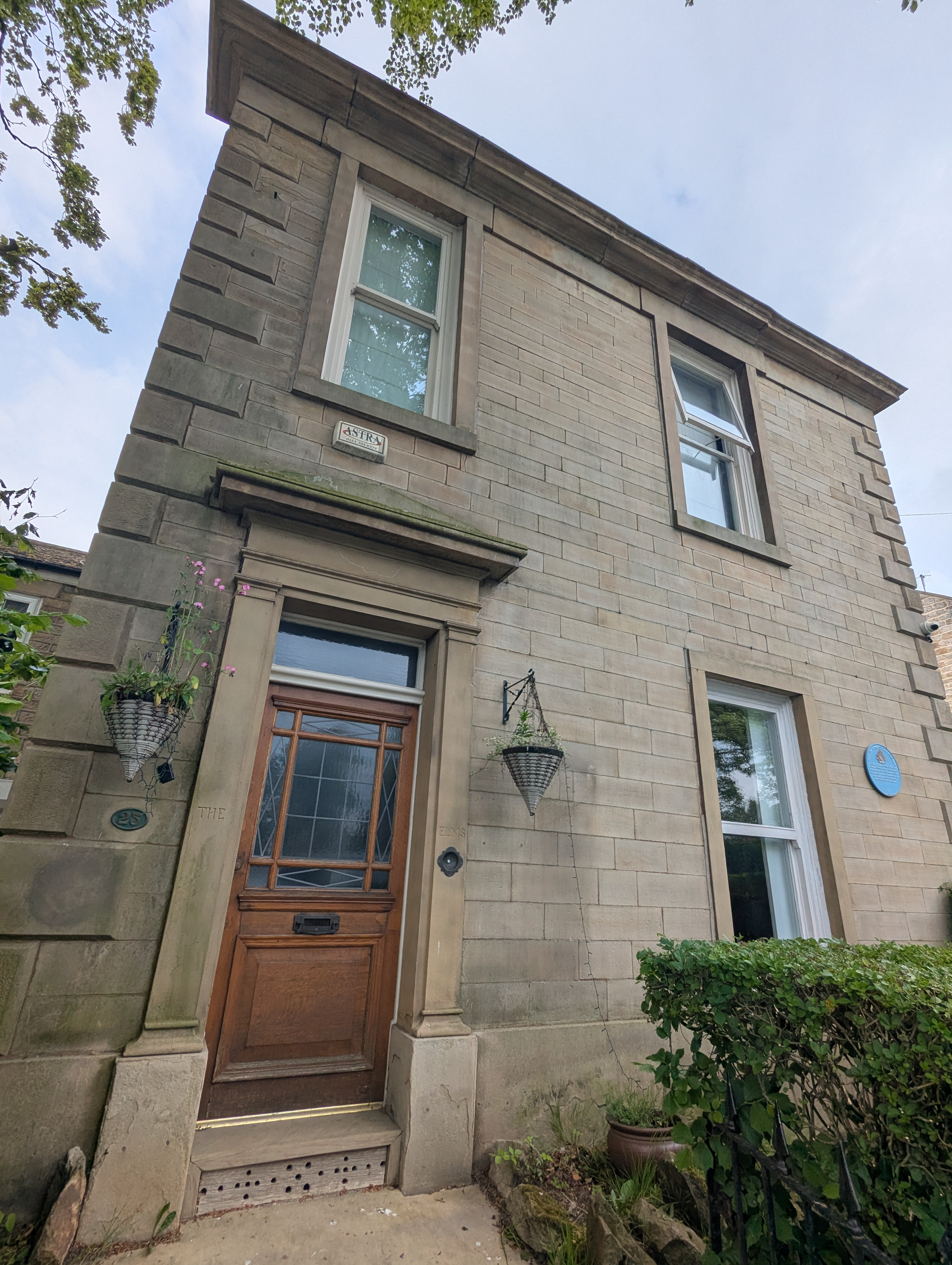
The house in Mottram in Longdendale, "The Elms" where Lowry lived until his death. The blue plaque on the wall reads: “The famous North Country artist L.S. Lowry lived here from 1948 until his death in 1976. The paintings of Lowry document the lives of ordinary people in the industrial communities of the North West.”

Lowry retired from the Pall Mall Property Company in 1952 on his 65th birthday. In 1957 an unrelated 13-year-old schoolgirl named Carol Ann Lowry (1944–2020) wrote to him at her mother's urging to ask his advice on becoming an artist. He visited her home in Heywood and befriended the family. His friendship with Carol Ann Lowry lasted for the rest of his life. BBC Radio 4 broadcast in 2001 a dramatisation by Glyn Hughes of Lowry's relationship with Carol Ann.

In the 1960s Lowry shared exhibitions in Salford with Warrington-born artist Reginald Waywell (1924–2019); and also exhibited alongside other contemporaries such as his friend Wigan artist Theodore Major.

Lowry joked about retiring from the art world, citing his lack of interest in the changing landscape. Instead, he began to focus on groups of figures and odd imaginary characters. Unknown to his friends and the public, Lowry produced a series of erotic works that were not seen until after his death. The paintings depict the mysterious "Ann" figure, who appears in portraits and sketches produced throughout his lifetime, enduring sexually charged and humiliating tortures. When these works were exhibited at the Art Council's Centenary exhibition at the Barbican in 1988, art critic Richard Dorment wrote in The Daily Telegraph that these works "reveal a sexual anxiety which is never so much as hinted at in the work of the previous 60 years." The group of erotic works, which are sometimes referred to as "the mannequin sketches" or "marionette works", are kept at the Lowry Centre and are available for visitors to see on request. Some are also brought up into the public display area on a rotation system. Manchester author Howard Jacobson has argued that the images are just part of Lowry's melancholy and tortured view of the world and that they would change the public perception of the complexity of his work if they were more widely seen.

== Death and legacy ==
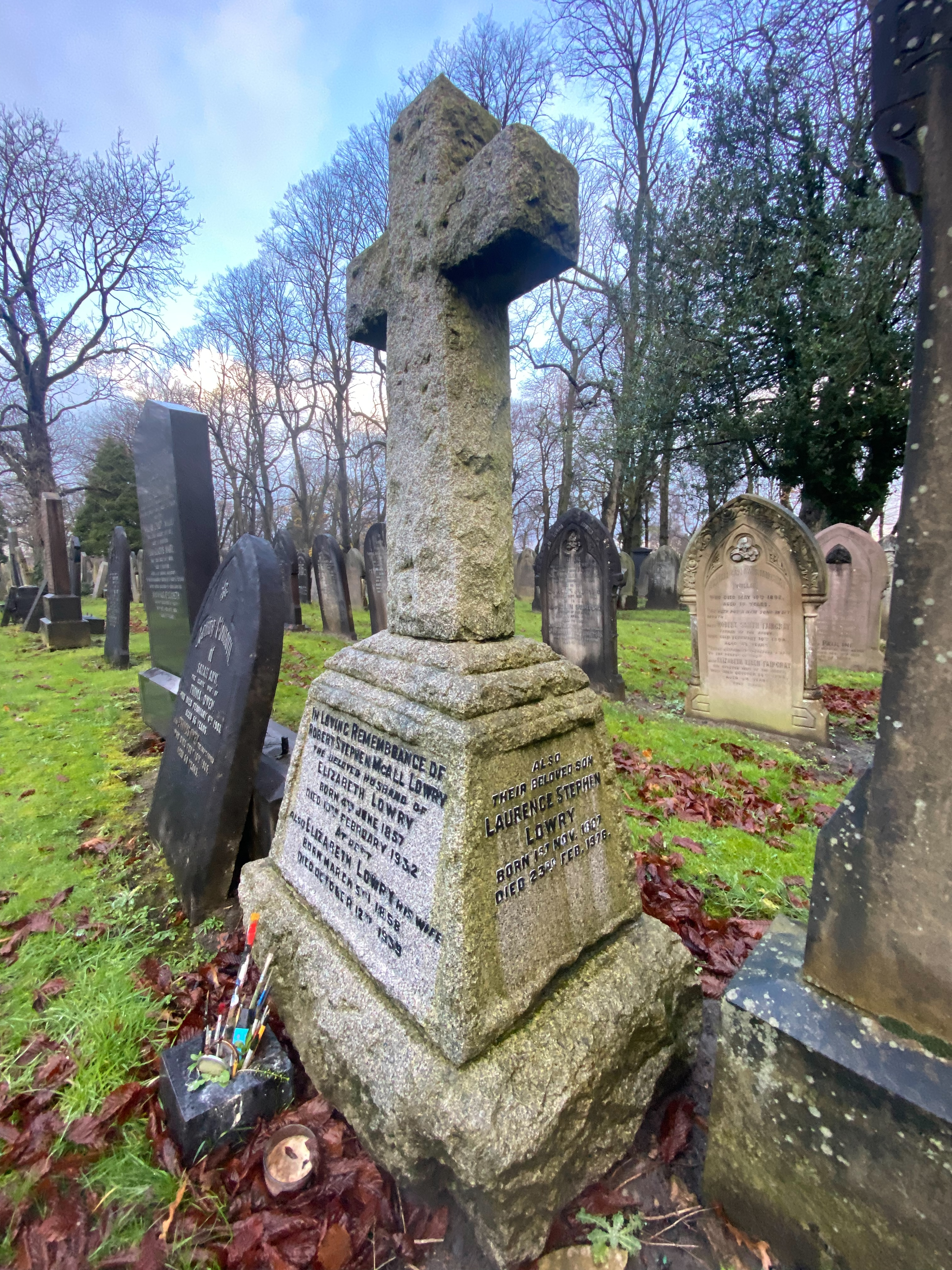
Grave of L. S. Lowry and his parents in Southern Cemetery, Manchester

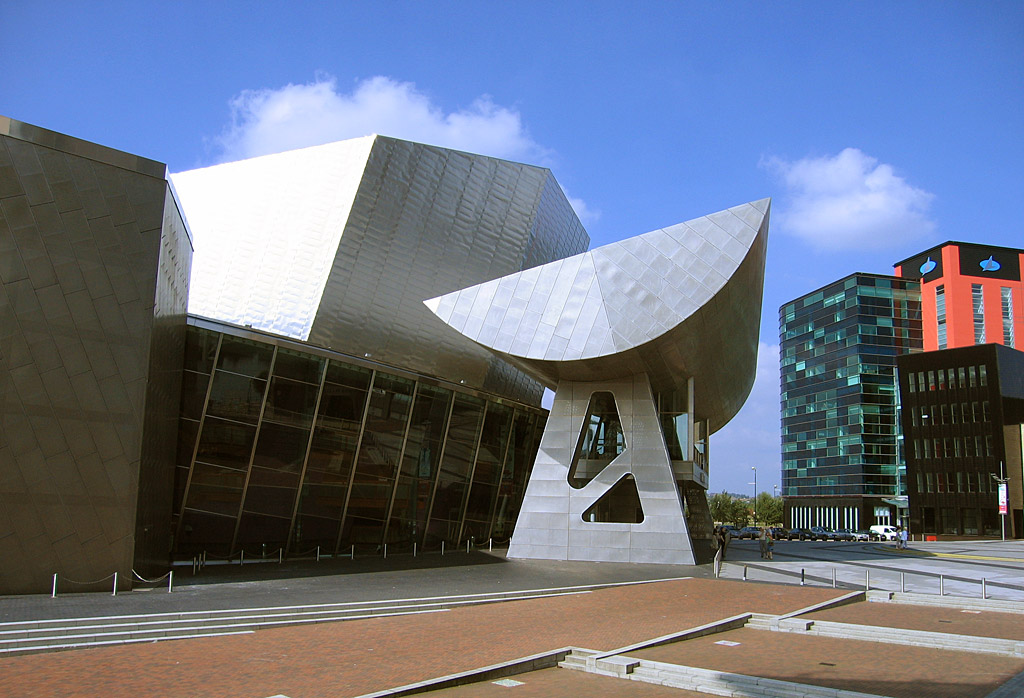
Entrance to the Lowry Centre on Salford Quays

Lowry died of pneumonia at the Woods Hospital in Glossop, Derbyshire, on 23 February 1976, aged 88. He was buried in the Southern Cemetery in Manchester, next to his parents. He left an estate valued at £298,459, and a considerable number of artworks by himself and others to Carol Ann Lowry, who, in 2001, obtained trademark protection of the artist's signature.

Lowry left a cultural legacy, his works often sold for millions of pounds and inspired other artists. The Lowry art gallery in Salford Quays was opened in 2000 at a cost of £106 million; named after him, the 2,000-square-metre (22,000 sq ft) gallery houses 55 of his paintings and 278 drawings—the world's largest collection of his work—with up to 100 on display. In January 2005, a statue of him was unveiled in Mottram in Longdendale 100 yards away from his home from 1948 until his death in 1976. The statue has been a target for vandals since it was unveiled. In 2006 the Lowry Centre in Salford hosted a contemporary dance performance inspired by his work.

To mark the centenary of his birth in 1987, Royston Futter, director of the L. S. Lowry Centenary Festival, on behalf of the City of Salford and the BBC commissioned the Northern Ballet Theatre and Gillian Lynne to create a dance drama in his honour. A Simple Man was choreographed and directed by Lynne, with music by Carl Davis, and starred Christopher Gable and Moira Shearer (in her last dance role). It was broadcast on BBC, for which it won a BAFTA award as the best arts programme in 1988, and also performed live on stage in November 1987. Further performances were held in London at Sadler's Wells in 1988, and again in 2009.

In February 2011 a bronze statue of Lowry was installed in the basement of his favourite pub, Sam's Chop House.

External videos
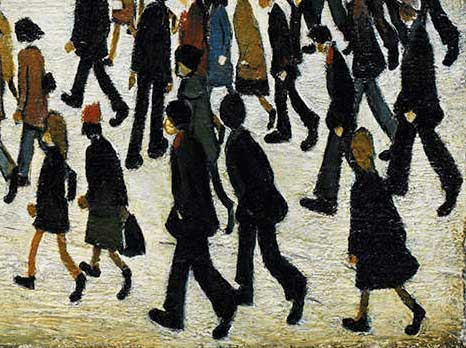
- Channel 4 News report on the Lowry retrospective exhibition at Tate Britain in 2013

In 2013 a retrospective was held at the Tate Britain in London, his first there. In 2014 his first solo exhibition outside the UK was held in Nanjing, China. One of the 'houses' at Wellacre Academy in Manchester is named after him.

== Awards and honours ==
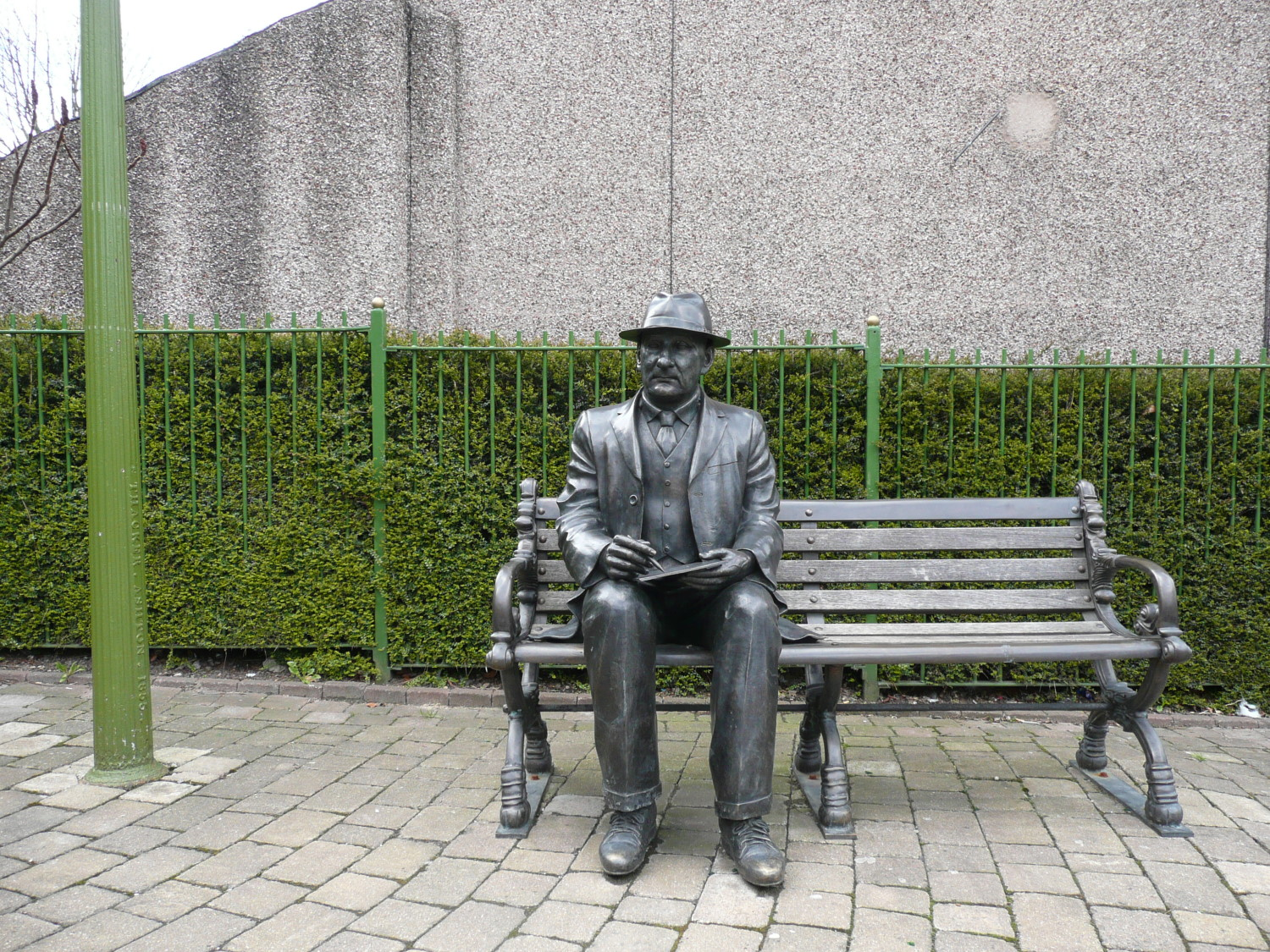
L. S. Lowry memorial at Mottram in Longdendale

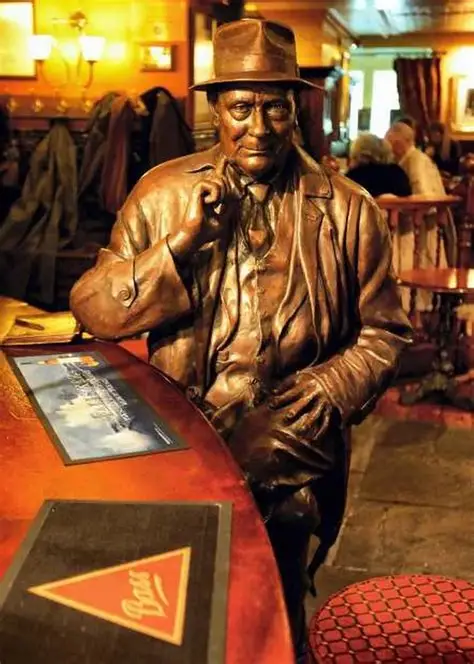
Statue of L.S Lowry situated at the bar of Sam's Chop House on Back Pool Fold in Manchester

Lowry was awarded an honorary Master of Arts degree by the University of Manchester in 1945, and Doctor of Letters in 1961. In April 1955 Lowry was elected as an Associate Member of the Royal Academy of Arts and in April 1962 became a full Royal Academician. At the end of December of the same year his membership status evolved to that of Senior Academician having reached the age of 75. He was given the freedom of the city of Salford in 1965.

In 1975 he was awarded honorary Doctor of Letters degrees by the Universities of Salford and Liverpool. In 1964, the art world celebrated his 77th birthday with an exhibition of his work and that of 25 contemporary artists who had submitted tributes at Monk's Hall Museum, Eccles. The Hallé orchestra performed a concert in his honour and Prime Minister Harold Wilson used Lowry's painting The Pond as his official Christmas card. Lowry's painting Coming Out of School was depicted on a postage stamp of highest denomination in a series issued by the Post Office depicting great British artists in 1968. Lowry twice declined appointment to the Order of the British Empire: as an Officer (OBE) in 1955, and as a Commander (CBE) in 1961, Lowry saying "There seemed little point ... once mother was dead" (as seen in the end credits of the movie Mrs Lowry & Son). He turned down a knighthood in 1968, and appointments to the Order of the Companions of Honour (CH) in 1972 and 1976. He holds the record for the most honours declined.

== Quotations ==
- On the industrial landscape
  - "We went to Pendlebury in 1909 from a residential side of Manchester, and we didn't like it. My father wanted to go to get near a friend for business reasons. We lived next door, and for a long time my mother never got to like it, and at first I disliked it, and then after about a year or so I got used to it, and then I got absorbed in it, then I got infatuated with it. Then I began to wonder if anyone had ever done it. Seriously, not one or two, but seriously; and it seemed to me by that time that it was a very fine industrial subject matter. And I couldn't see anybody at that time who had done it – and nobody had done it, it seemed."
  - "Most of my land and townscape is composite. Made up; part real and part imaginary ... bits and pieces of my home locality. I don't even know I'm putting them in. They just crop up on their own, like things do in dreams."
- On his style
  - "I wanted to paint myself into what absorbed me ... Natural figures would have broken the spell of it, so I made my figures half unreal. Some critics have said that I turned my figures into puppets, as if my aim were to hint at the hard economic necessities that drove them. To say the truth, I was not thinking very much about the people. I did not care for them in the way a social reformer does. They are part of a private beauty that haunted me. I loved them and the houses in the same way: as part of a vision.
  - "I am a simple man, and I use simple materials: ivory black, vermilion, prussian blue, yellow ochre, flake white and no medium. That's all I've ever used in my paintings. I like oils ... I like a medium you can work into over a period of time."
- On painting his "Seascapes"
  - "It's the battle of life – the turbulence of the sea ... I have been fond of the sea all my life, how wonderful it is, yet how terrible it is. But I often think ... what if it suddenly changed its mind and didn't turn the tide? And came straight on? If it didn't stay and came on and on and on and on ... That would be the end of it all."
- On art
  - "You don't need brains to be a painter, just feelings."
  - "I am not an artist. I am a man who paints."
  - "If people call me a Sunday painter, I'm a Sunday painter who paints every day of the week."

== Works ==
Lowry's work is held in many public and private collections. The largest collection is held by Salford City Council and displayed at The Lowry. Its collection has about 400 works. X-ray analyses have revealed hidden figures under his drawings – the "Ann" figures. Going to the Match, formerly owned by the Professional Footballers' Association (PFA), is displayed at The Lowry along with a preparatory pencil sketch.

The Tate Gallery in London owns 23 works. The City of Southampton owns The Floating Bridge, The Canal Bridge and An Industrial Town. His work is featured at MOMA, in New York City. The Christchurch Art Gallery Te Puna o Waiwhetu in Christchurch, New Zealand has Factory at Widnes (1956) in its collection. The painting was one of the gallery's most important acquisitions of the 1950s and remains the highlight of its collection of modern British art.

In the early days of his career Lowry was a member of the Manchester Group of Lancashire artists, exhibiting with them at Margo Ingham's Mid-Day Studios in Manchester. He made a small painting of the Mid-Day Studios which is in the collection of the Manchester City Art Gallery.

During his life Lowry made about 1,000 paintings and over 8,000 drawings.

=== Selected paintings ===
- 1920 St Augustine's church
- 1925 Going to the Mill
- 1928 Irk Place
- 1935 The Fever Van
- 1936 Laying a Foundation Stone — the mayor of Swinton and Pendlebury, laying a foundation stone in Clifton
- 1938 A Cricket Match — sold for £1.2m at Sotheby's, in June 2019, during the 2019 Cricket World Cup
- 1941 Houses on a Hill
- 1943 A Fylde Farm — collected by Queen Elizabeth The Queen Mother and hung at Clarence House
- 1943 Going to Work — painted as a war artist and in the collection of the Imperial War Museum.
- 1945 V.E. Day
- 1946 Good Friday, Daisy Nook — sold in 2007 for £3.8 million (then record price for a Lowry)
- 1947 A River Bank — bought in 1951 by Bury Council for £150 and controversially sold in 2006, for £1.25 million at Christie's, by the Metropolitan Borough of Bury, towards funding a £10 million budget deficit
- 1947 Iron Works
- 1947 Cranes and Ships, Glasgow Docks — acquired by Glasgow City Council at Christie's in November 2005 for £198,400, specifically for display in the new Riverside Museum
- 1949 Agricultural fair, Mottram-in-Longdendale
- 1949 The Cripples - features number of disabled people in a park, including Lowry as a disabled person (centre). The people are a mixture of imaginary and real people. For example, it is believed that a man known locally known as 'Johnny on wheels' is depicted to the right.
- 1949 The Football Match — not seen in public for two decades before May 2011 when offered for sale at Christie's; later sold for £5.6 million, a record price for a Lowry painting.
- 1949 The Regatta
- 1950 The Pond — the image was used as a Christmas card by Prime Minister Harold Wilson in 1964
- 1952 Ancoats Hospital Outpatients Hall — a rare internal scene, showing Ancoats Hospital and given to The Whitworth Gallery in 1975.
- 1953 Football Ground — fans converging on Bolton Wanderers's old football ground Burnden Park; painted for a competition run by the Football Association, it was later renamed Going to the Match and was bought by the Professional Footballers' Association for a record £1.9 million in 1999. It was resold at Christie's for £7,846,500 in October 2022.
- 1953 The Railway Platform, a scene of railway passengers standing on the platform at Pendlebury railway station
- 1954 Piccadilly Gardens, a view of the former sunken gardens in Piccadilly Gardens, Manchester, now in Manchester Art Gallery collection
- 1955 A Young Man
- 1955 Industrial Landscape
- 1956 Fairground at Daisy Nook
- 1957 Sunday Afternoon — sold at Sotheby's in March 2024 for £6.3 million by Sir Keith and Lady Showering, who had owned it since 1967. It is one of Lowry's largest canvasses.
- 1960 Old church and steps

=== Drawings ===
- 1924 View from a window of the Royal Technical College
- 1924 The Flat Iron Market
- 1928 Newton Mill and bowling green
- 1930 Swinton Industrial Schools
- 1936 Dewars Lane (Dewars Lane is now part of the Lowry Trail in Berwick-upon-Tweed)
- 1942 A Bit of Wenlock Edge
- 1947 Figures in lane
- 1945? St Luke's Church, Old Street, London
- 1953 Agecroft regatta

=== Stolen Lowry works ===
Five Lowry art works were stolen from the Grove Fine Art Gallery in Cheadle Hulme, Stockport on 2 May 2007. The most valuable were The Viaduct, estimated value of £700,000 and The Tanker Entering the Tyne, which is valued at over £500,000. The Surgery, The Bridge at Ringley and The Street Market were also stolen. The paintings were later found in a house in Halewood near Liverpool. Only one of the four robbers was caught and convicted; two other men were later convicted for possession of the stolen works. A further pencil drawing, "The Skater", has never been returned.

=== Attributed works in 2015 ===
In July 2015 three works – Lady with Dogs, Darby and Joan and Crowd Scene – featured in the BBC One series Fake or Fortune?. The presenters concluded that the works were genuine, despite their weak provenance and the fact that Lowry was "probably the most faked British artist, his deceptively simple style of painting making him a soft target for forgers". An important element in the programme's assessment was Lowry's claim to have used only five colours including lead white, whereas a contemporary photograph showed that he had also used titanium white and zinc white.

=== Discovered work ===
The Mill, Pendlebury, a painting never publicly exhibited or featured in any book, was found in the estate of Leonard D. Hamilton, a British-American researcher, after his death in 2019. The work was listed at Christie's with an estimate of £700,000 to £1 million and sold on 21 January 2020 to a private collector for £2.65 million.

== Art market ==
In March 2014 fifteen of Lowry's works, from the A.J. Thompson Collection, were auctioned at Sotheby's in London; the total sale estimate of £15 million was achieved, even though two paintings failed to reach their reserve price and were withdrawn. Thompson, owner of the Salford Express, collected only Lowry paintings, starting in 1982. The auction included the paintings Peel Park, Salford and Piccadilly Circus, London, Lowry's most expensive painting at auction to date, which fetched £5.6 million in 2011 but only £5.1 million in 2014. Lowry painted very few London scenes, and only two depict Piccadilly Circus.

== In popular culture ==
- In January 1968, rock band Status Quo paid tribute to Lowry in their first hit single "Pictures of Matchstick Men".
- In 1978, Brian and Michael reached number one in the UK Singles Chart with the tribute single "Matchstalk Men and Matchstalk Cats and Dogs".
- Manchester rock band Oasis released a music video for the song "The Masterplan", to promote their 2006 compilation album Stop the Clocks, using animation in the style of his paintings. The video sets the group in a number of Lowry scenes, but clues as to their modernity are given by inclusion of such items as a satellite dish.
- In August 2010, the play Figures Half Unreal was performed by the Brass Bastion theatre company in Berwick-upon-Tweed where Lowry was a regular visitor.
- On 1 November 2012, Google celebrated his 125th birthday with a Google Doodle.
- Lowry is mentioned in the chorus of the Manic Street Preachers' song "30-Year War" on their 2013 album Rewind the Film:

So you hide all Lowry's paintings
For 30 years or more
'Cos he turned down a knighthood
And you must now settle the score

- The 2019 film Mrs Lowry & Son, directed by Adrian Noble and starring Vanessa Redgrave and Timothy Spall, depicts the fraught relationship between Lowry and his elderly bed-ridden mother between 1934 and 1939.
- Sunday painter by Dutch band Nits is a song inspired by Lowry.

== See also ==
- List of people who have declined a British honour
