= The Lowry =

Arts centre in Salford, England

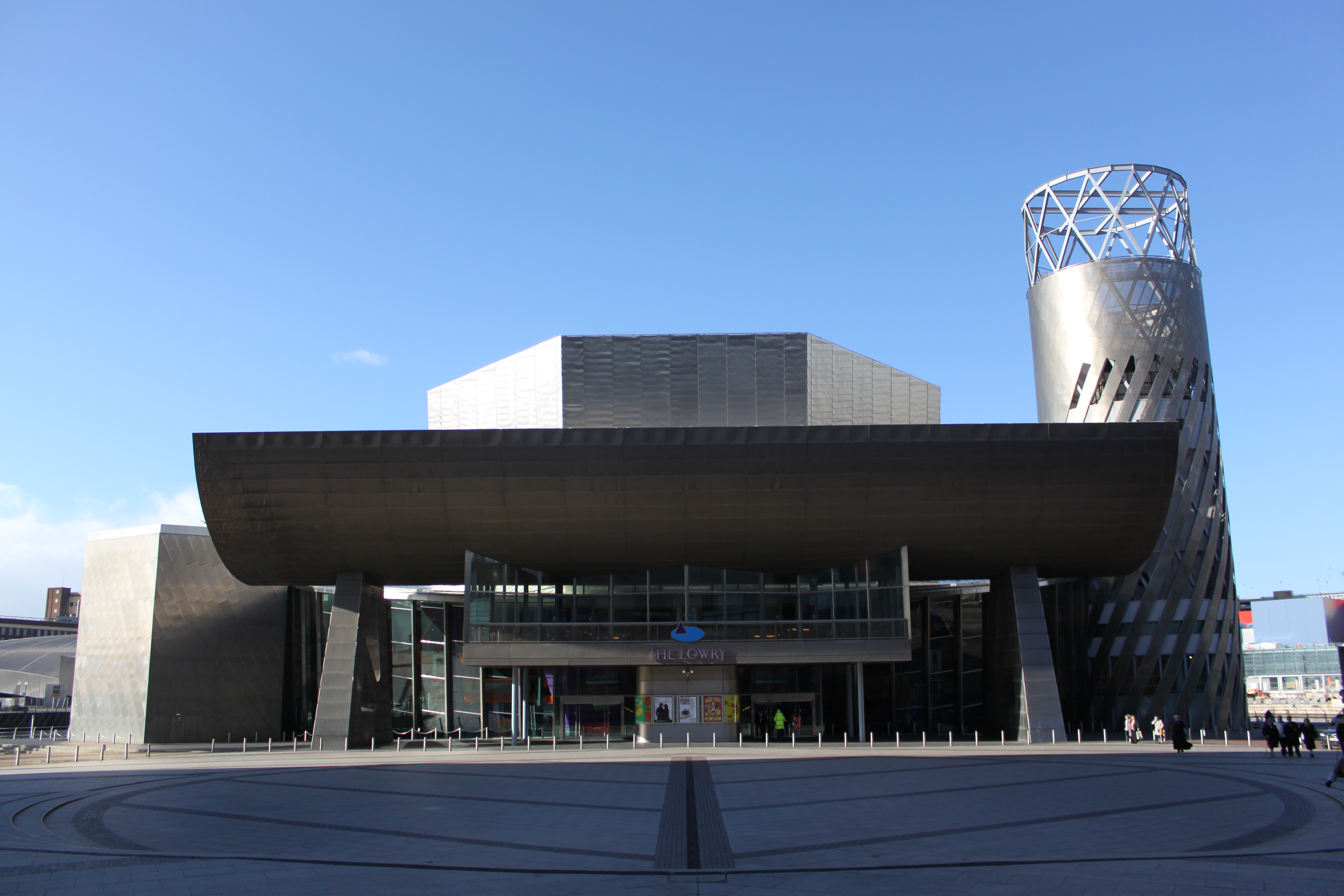
- The Lowry's main entrance in 2010
- Interactive map of The Lowry
- Location: Salford Quays; Salford; Greater Manchester; England
- Coordinates: 53°28′14.60″N 2°17′47.03″W
- Capacity: Lyric: 1,730; Quays: 466; Studio: 150
- Type: Art gallery and Lyric and Quays theatres and Studio
- Event: Arts centre
- Public transit: Imperial War Museum; MediaCityUK

Construction
- Built: 1999
- Opened: 2000
- Cost: £106 million
- Architect: Michael Wilford

Website
- thelowry.com

Lowry is a theatre and gallery complex at Salford Quays, Salford, Greater Manchester, England. It is named after the early 20th-century painter L. S. Lowry, known for his paintings of industrial scenes in North West England. The complex opened on 28 April 2000 and was officially opened on 12 October 2000 by Queen Elizabeth II.

== History ==
=== Background ===
To redevelop the derelict Salford docks, Salford City Council developed a regeneration plan in 1988 for the brownfield site highlighting the leisure, cultural and tourism potential of the area, and included a flagship development that would involve the creation of a performing arts centre. The initial proposals were for two theatres and an art gallery on a prominent site on Pier 8.

Between 1990 and 1991 a competition was launched and architects James Stirling Michael Wilford Associates was selected. After the death of James Stirling in June 1992 Michael Wilford continued the project. The city council bid for Millennium and other British and European funds and private sector finance to progress the project. Funding was secured in 1996 and The Lowry Trust became responsible for the project which comprised The Lowry Centre, the plaza, a footbridge, a retail outlet shopping mall and Digital World Centre. The National Lottery provided over £21 million of funding towards its construction. The project was completed in 2000 at a cost of £106 million. The Lowry name was adopted in honour of the local artist, L. S. Lowry. In 2002, a nearby shopping centre that was also named after Lowry was opened.

The complex is close to the Imperial War Museum North and the Old Trafford football stadium. It is served by the MediaCityUK stop on the Metrolink tram network. In 2010 and 2011 it was Greater Manchester's most visited tourist attraction. A sting operation by the Salford Star in 2006 attempted to demonstrate intolerance towards unaccompanied teenagers in hoodies entering the complex.

The complex opened on 28 April 2000 and was officially opened on 12 October 2000 by Queen Elizabeth II.

=== Design and construction ===
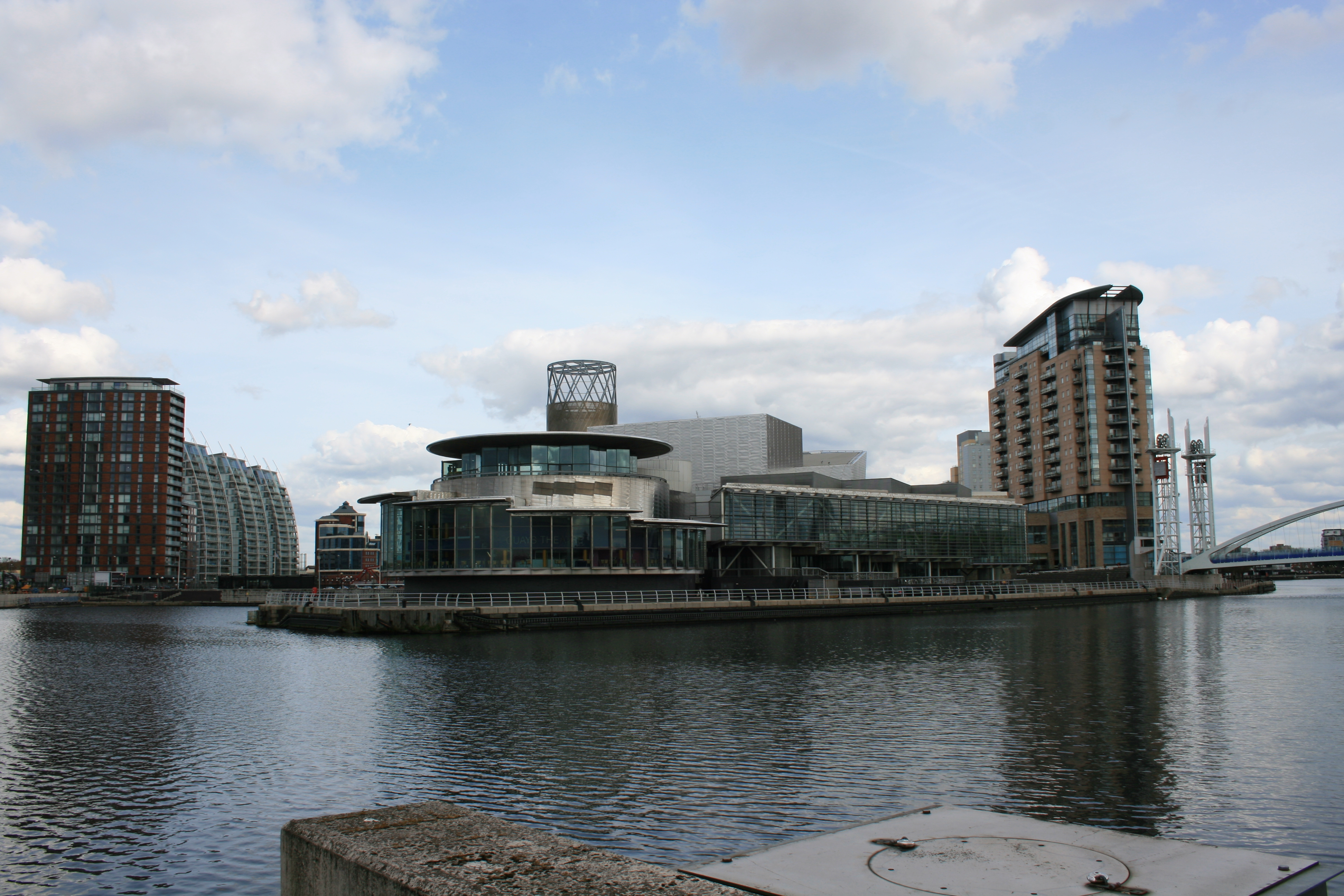
The Lowry's waterfront setting

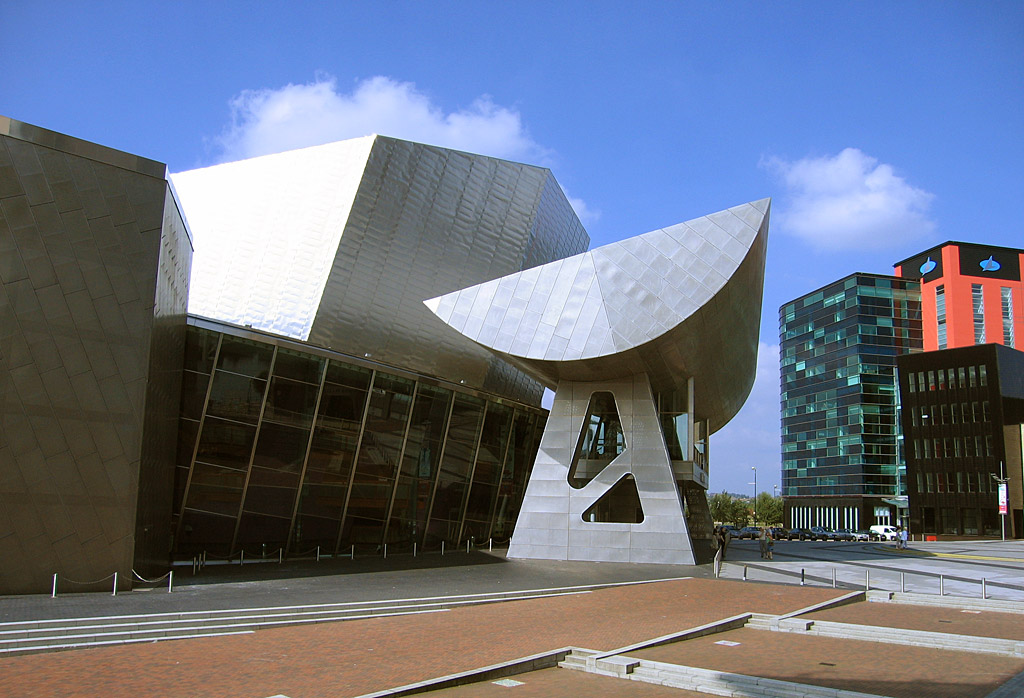
Side view of the main entrance

The complex was designed by Michael Wilford with structural engineer Buro Happold and constructed by Bovis Construction. Groundbreaking took place on 19 June 1997. The Lowry is built on a triangular site at the end of Pier 8 and has a triangular plan. A promenade encircling the building provides views of the Manchester Ship Canal, MediaCityUK and the Salford Quays developments.

The foyer faces the public plaza, where there is a large aerofoil canopy at the entrance clad with perforated steel and illuminated from inside at night. Much of the building is clad in stainless steel and glass.

The Lowry footbridge spanning the ship canal was designed and project managed by Parkman, with design support from Carlos Fernandez Casado. It is a lift bridge with a clear span of 100 metres (330 ft), which lifts vertically to provide a 26-metre (85 ft) clearance for shipping using the canal. The bridge span is a tied arch and the towers are constructed in tubular steelwork to provide an open aspect to view the lifting counterweight and sheaves.

In November 2015, the Lowry opened a new bar and restaurant, called Pier 8, after a 12-week closure on the original bar and restaurant. The new space cost £3m to develop and is part of an ongoing £5m investment programme to improve facilities and reduce the environmental footprint of the complex.

The new features include a zinc topped curving bar with room to seat 150 people for casual dining. The bar also has a feature tree with leaves made from cotton, to commemorate Salford Quays' history at the centre of the cotton shipping industry. The new restaurant contains seven private booths, a newly designed open kitchen, and a second large room at the rear which can be opened up to accommodate more diners or private functions. Major structural changes have taken place in the building for the design, including the removal of a large staircase and the addition of an external entrance to the bar and restaurant, as well as added areas made to look like shipping containers.

=== Reception ===
The regeneration of Salford Quays with Michael Wilford's Lowry as its centrepiece has led to references in the media to the "Bilbao effect", the phenomenon where the creation of a new, architecturally striking cultural amenity (such as Frank Gehry's Guggenheim Museum in Bilbao) brings economic improvement to areas of urban decay.

When the Lowry opened in 2000, MP Gerald Kaufman described the building as "Salford's Guggenheim". The Culture Secretary Tessa Jowell stated in 2005 that Salford had become "the new Bilbao" as a result of the opening of The Lowry. However, Hugh Aldersey-Williams, writing in the New Statesman, was less convinced, describing The Lowry as "not quite 'Salford's Guggenheim' ... It is ultimately too small and too well behaved ... although there are obvious shared aims."

== Facilities ==
=== Gallery ===
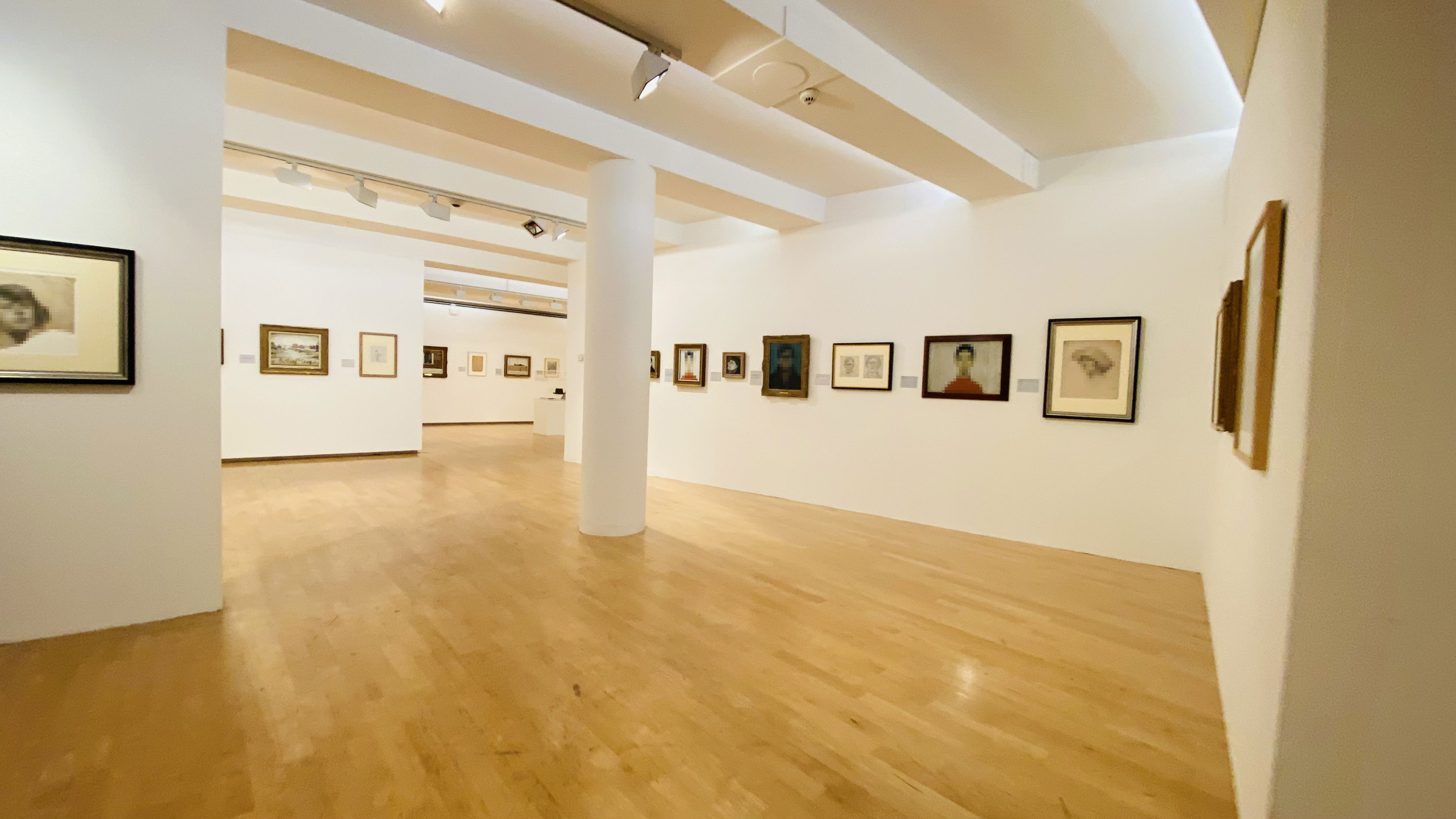
The permanent collection on display in The Lowry

The complex contains 2,000 m^{2} (22,000 sq ft) of gallery space devoted to the permanent collection of works by L. S. Lowry, as well as other temporary exhibitions.

Most of the L. S. Lowry works were originally collected from the 1930s onwards by Salford Museum and Art Gallery, and the collection was transferred to the new purpose-built museum when it opened in 2000. The collection includes about 400 pieces in oil, pastel and watercolours from all periods of Lowry's career. Noted works on display include:

- Coming from the Mill (watercolour, c.1917-18)
- Coming from the Mill (oil on canvas, 1930)
- Going to the Match (oil on canvas, 1953)
- The Cripples (oil on canvas, 1949)
- Industrial Landscape (oil on canvas, 1953)
- Portrait of Ann (oil on board, 1957)
- A Head of a Man with Red Eyes (oil on board, 1938)

The Artworks Creativity Gallery, designed and implemented by architects Reich-Petch (responsible for developing the National Museum of Natural History in Washington D.C.), uses multimedia to encourage visitor participation and interaction with exhibits to transform gallery space.

Between October 2011 and January 2012 the gallery hosted an exhibition of about 100 works by Lowry's teacher, Pierre Adolphe Valette, including paintings of Manchester from Manchester Art Gallery and loans from private owners.

The gallery organises exhibitions on children's literature in summer, including Julia Donaldson, Axel Scheffler, and Quentin Blake.

In 2025, Lowry produced a 360-degree digital installation of Going to the Match in the gallery.

An Archive Room houses material related to the artist including books, catalogues of his exhibitions and auctions, press cuttings, tapes of interviews with Lowry and others, photographs and ephemera. The archive is open by appointment.

=== Theatre ===
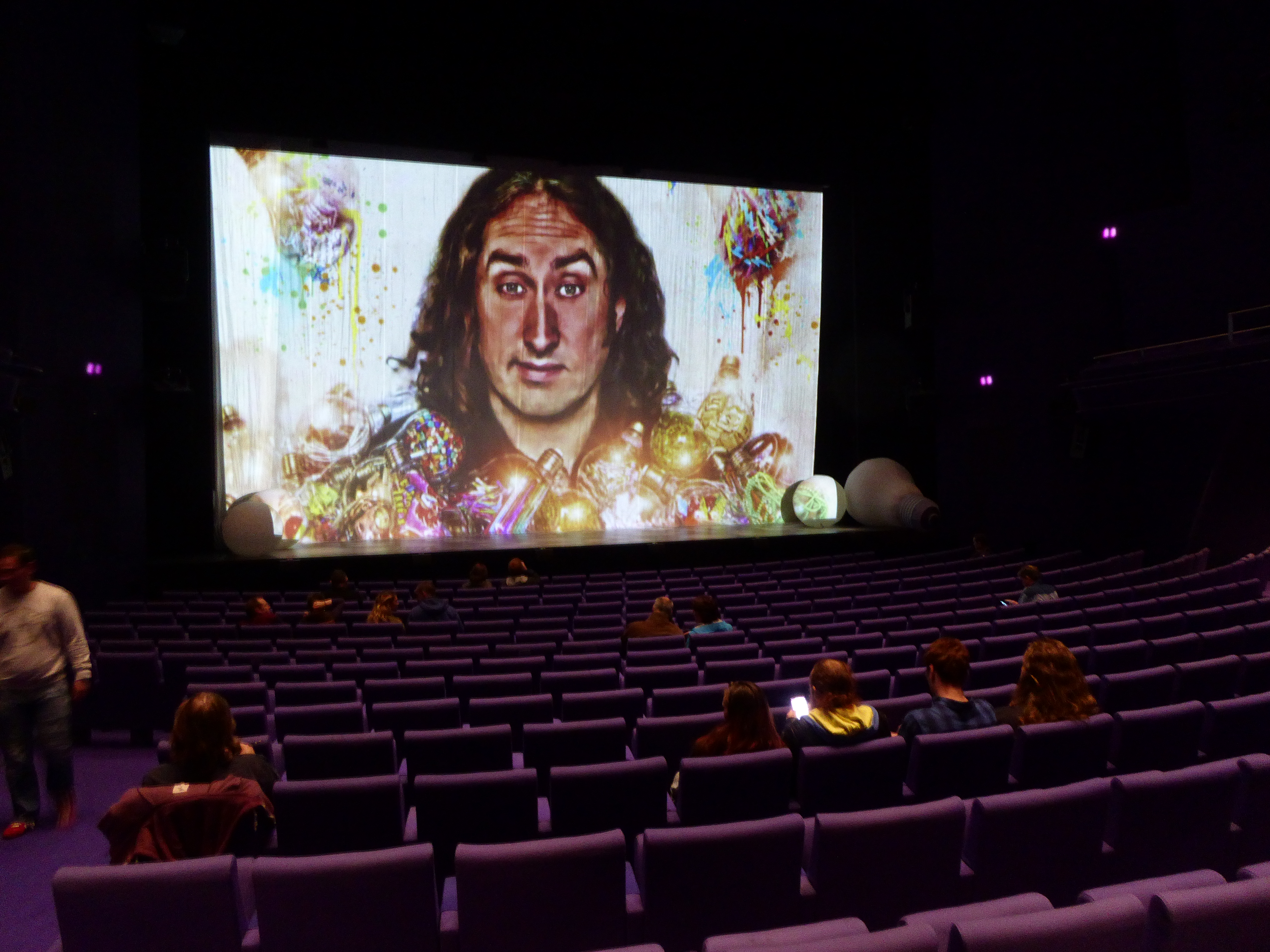
The Lyric Theatre

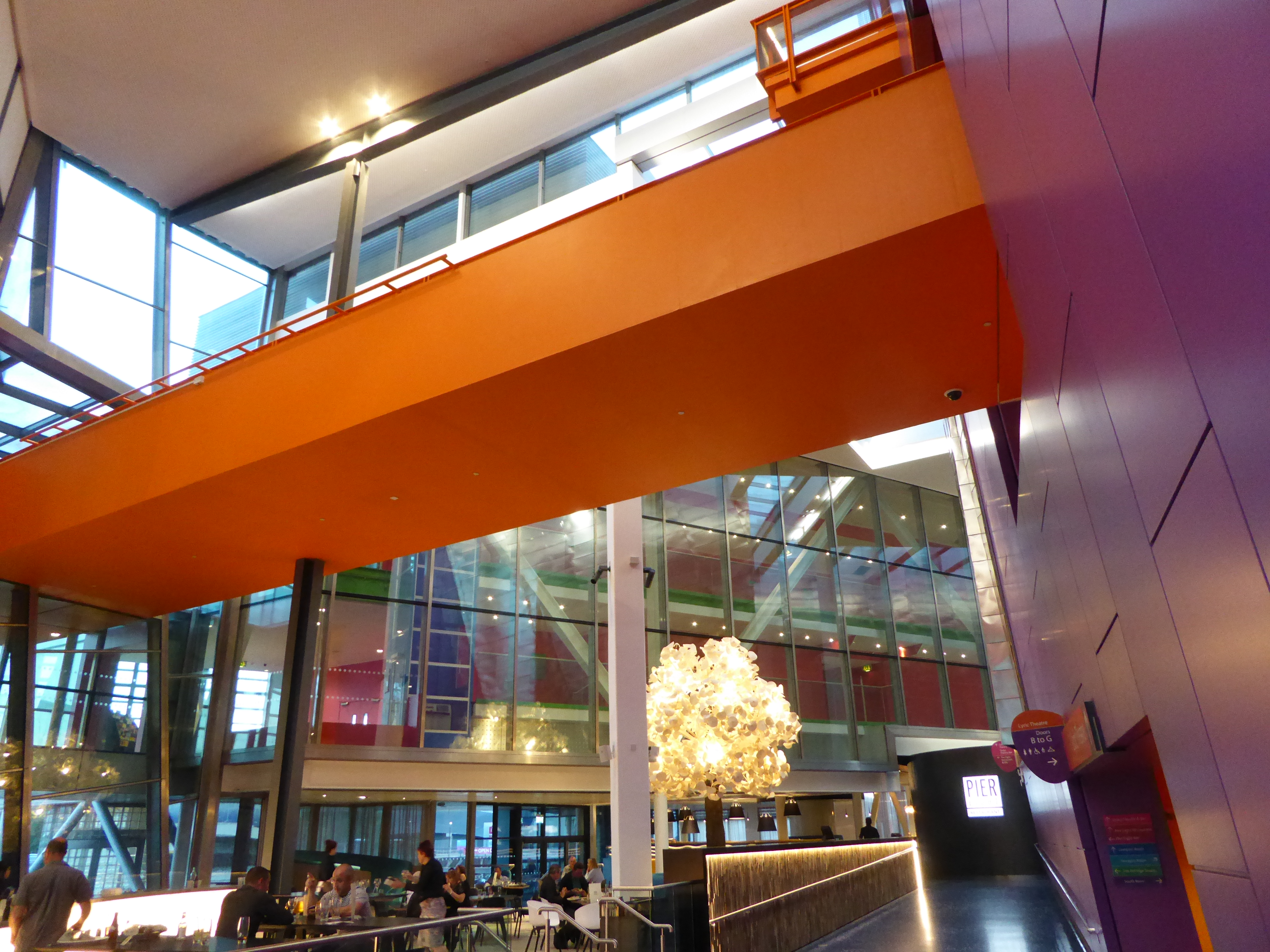
The Lowry entrance foyer

At the core of the complex are two theatres and a drama studio. The Lyric Theatre has 1,730 seats while the Quays has 466. The theatres host touring plays, comedy and musical events and Opera North. The Lyric Theatre has the largest stage in the United Kingdom outside London's West End. It played host to the 2011 Royal Variety Performance.

The Daughter-in-Law by D. H. Lawrence, a play in Nottingham dialect, neither published nor performed in Lawrence's lifetime was revived at the Lyric Theatre in 2012. The Lowry was the venue for the grand final of the BBC quiz show Mastermind in 2003.

The Lyric Theatre has also housed the first and only televised recording of the radio show I'm Sorry I Haven't a Clue, which Humphrey Lyttelton chaired in April 2008. An edited version aired on BBC Four.

It also hosts auditions for Britain's Got Talent.
