= Irlams o' th' Height =

Suburb of Salford, England

Coordinates: 53°29′54″N 2°18′36″W

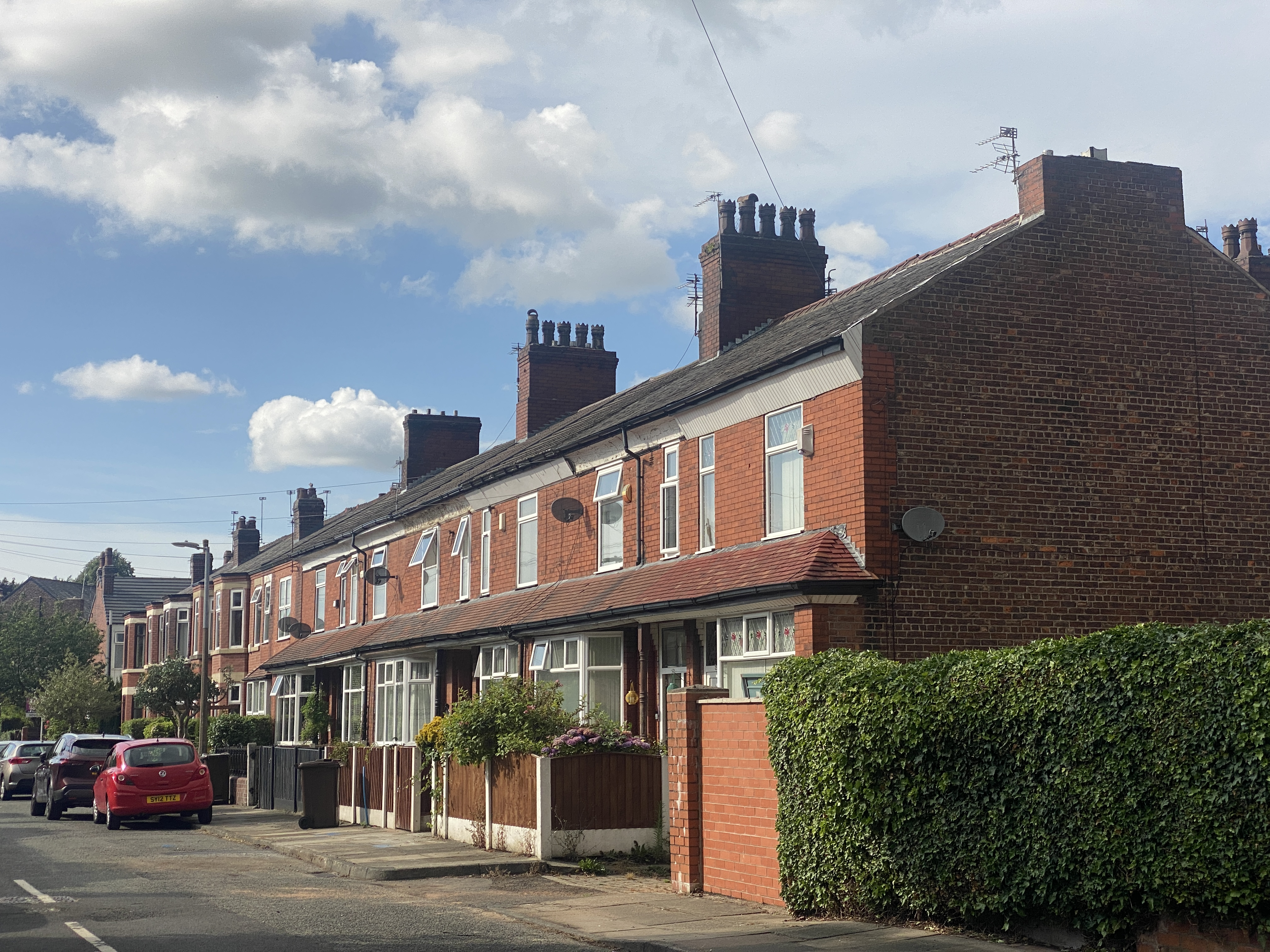
- Housing on Glenfyne Road

- Location within Greater Manchester
- OS grid reference: SD795003
- Metropolitan borough: Salford
- Metropolitan county: Greater Manchester
- Region: North West
- Country: England
- Sovereign state: United Kingdom
- Post town: SALFORD
- Postcode district: M6
- Dialling code: 0161
- Police: Greater Manchester
- Fire: Greater Manchester
- Ambulance: North West
- UK Parliament: Salford

Irlams o' th' Height is a suburb of Salford, Greater Manchester, England, on top of the Irwell Valley, on higher ground than Pendleton, hence the name. The first part of the name derives from the Irlam family that ran the Pack Horse Inn in the 17th and 18th centuries.

It was first recorded in the parish of Eccles in 1180. The village became prosperous in the 19th century due to the Industrial Revolution and became a well-established community of handloom weavers.

Some parts of the area are now designated as a conservation area, centring on Queen Street, King Street and Claremont Road, as these retain the early street pattern. Thirty buildings are recognised as being of archaeological or historic interest in the Greater Manchester Sites and Monuments Register. The conservation area was designated in 1991 and is 1.02 hectares (2.52 acres) in size.

== The Irlam family ==
Since the end of the 16th century, there had been an inn on the turnpike road from Manchester and Salford towards Chorley, Preston and Lancaster called the Pack Horse. It was demolished in 1975, due to a large redevelopment of the A580/A6/A666 road junction.

In the 17th and 18th centuries, the Pack Horse was in the hands of members of the Irlam family, as follows:

- Thomas Irlam I - to 1600
- Thomas Irlam II - 1600–1620
- Peter Irlam - 1629
- Richard Irlam - 1647–1666
- Robert Irlam - 1684–1702
- Jane Irlam - 1718
- Richard Irlam - 1722–1726
- John Irlam - 1739
- Peter Irlam - 1740–1752
- Martha Irlam - 1754–1768

With the Pack Horse being run by the Irlam family for well over a century and a half, it became known locally as Irlam's. With its location on ground higher than Pendleton, the area soon became commonly known as The Height. Coupled with the Pack Horse being referred to as Irlam's, the developing hamlet/village became known as Irlam's on the Height or, as it evolved into today's official name, Irlams o' th' Height.

== Transport ==
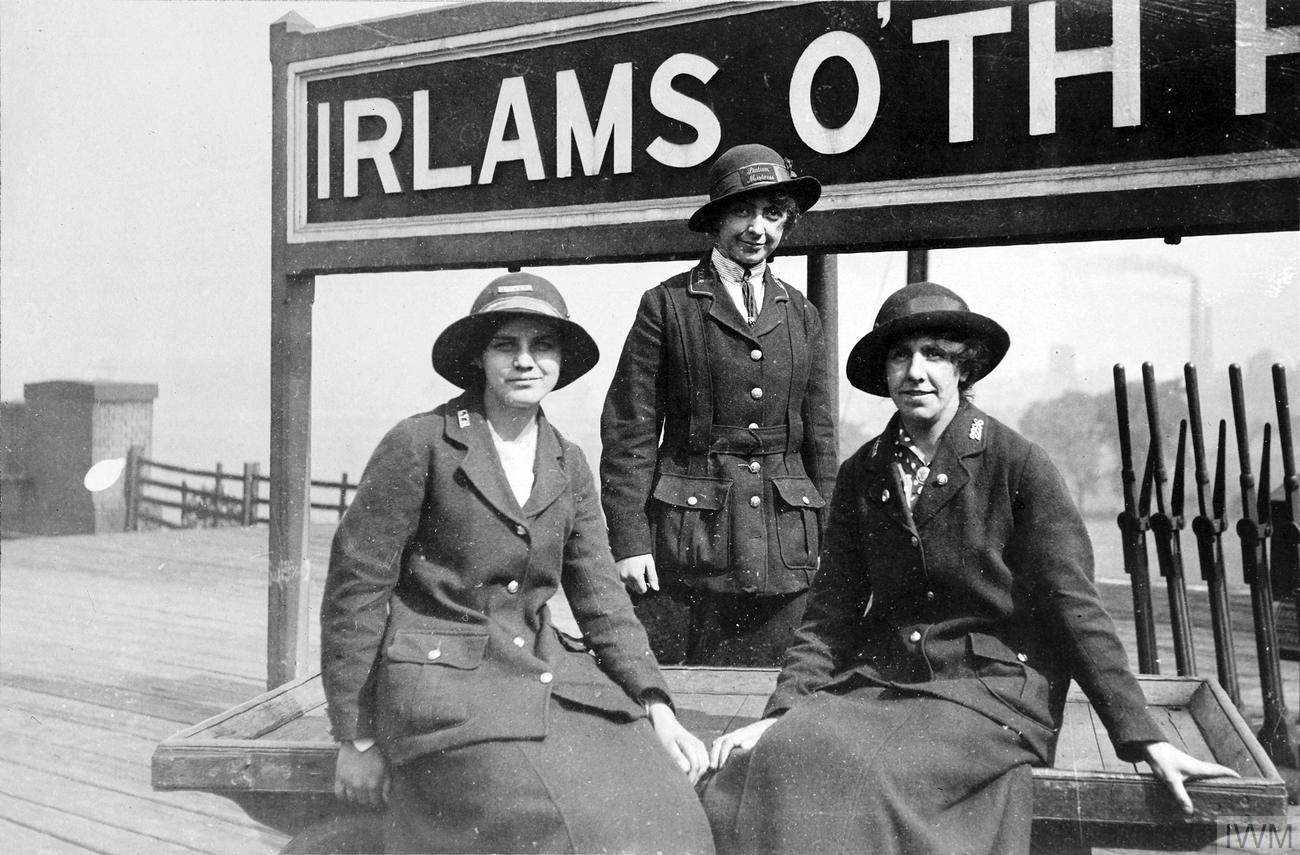
Railway workers at the station during WWI.

The suburb no longer has its own railway station; the nearest are now at Eccles, Salford Crescent, Swinton and Clifton.

Irlams o' th' Height railway station closed on 5 March 1956, due to low passenger numbers. It was situated on the Manchester to Southport Line, via Wigan Wallgate. Stations at Pendlebury and Pendleton also closed in 1960 and 1994 respectively.

One of the main features of Irlams o' th' Height is the A6 dual carriageway running through it; Bolton Road, which was formerly the A6, lies parallel. The A6 connects Carlisle with Luton, via Manchester and Derby.

A number of public bus services pass through the area, stopping at various stops along Bolton Road. These services include:

- Service 8 – Shudehill to Bolton (via Salford Shopping Centre and Pendlebury).
- Services 36 and 37 – Piccadilly Gardens to Bolton (via Salford Shopping Centre).
- Service 38 – Manchester to Logistics North (via Walkden).
- Service 70 – Pendleton to Eccles (serving Claremont Road).
- Services 74 and 75 – Local circular routes covering Pendleton, Agecroft and Irlams o' th' Height.

== Notable people ==
Just over the boundary with Pendlebury stands the parish church of St John the Evangelist, which includes a burial ground. Among those buried there is Geoff Bent, one of eight Manchester United players who died as a result of the Munich air disaster in February 1958. Bent was born locally in 1932. Irlams o' th' Height has a large number of Manchester United fans, being home to past managers and players and pubs holding supporters' meetings.

St John's is also the resting place of the captain of Swinton Rugby League Club, Jim Valentine, an England rugby union international in the late Victorian era. He was killed by lightning at Barmouth, Wales, on Monday 25 July 1904, whilst on holiday, four days before his 38th birthday. His 48 tries in the 1888–89 season still stands as a club record.

== Churches ==
- Holy Angels CoE Church, Moorfield Road
- St. Luke's RC Church, Swinton Park Road
- Height Methodist Church, King Street

== Education ==
There are three primary schools in the district:

- St. Luke's RC Primary School, Swinton Park Road
- Summerville Primary School, Summerville Road
- Light Oaks Primary School, Lancaster Road

(St John's CofE Primary School is situated just over the boundary in Pendlebury).

Pendleton College, on Dronfield Road, lies on the site of the former Salford Technical High School; this later formed part of Salford Grammar Technical School, which closed in 1973.

Buile Hill Academy is next door on Eccles Old Road (A576), close to Seedley.

== Local amenities ==
=== Public houses ===
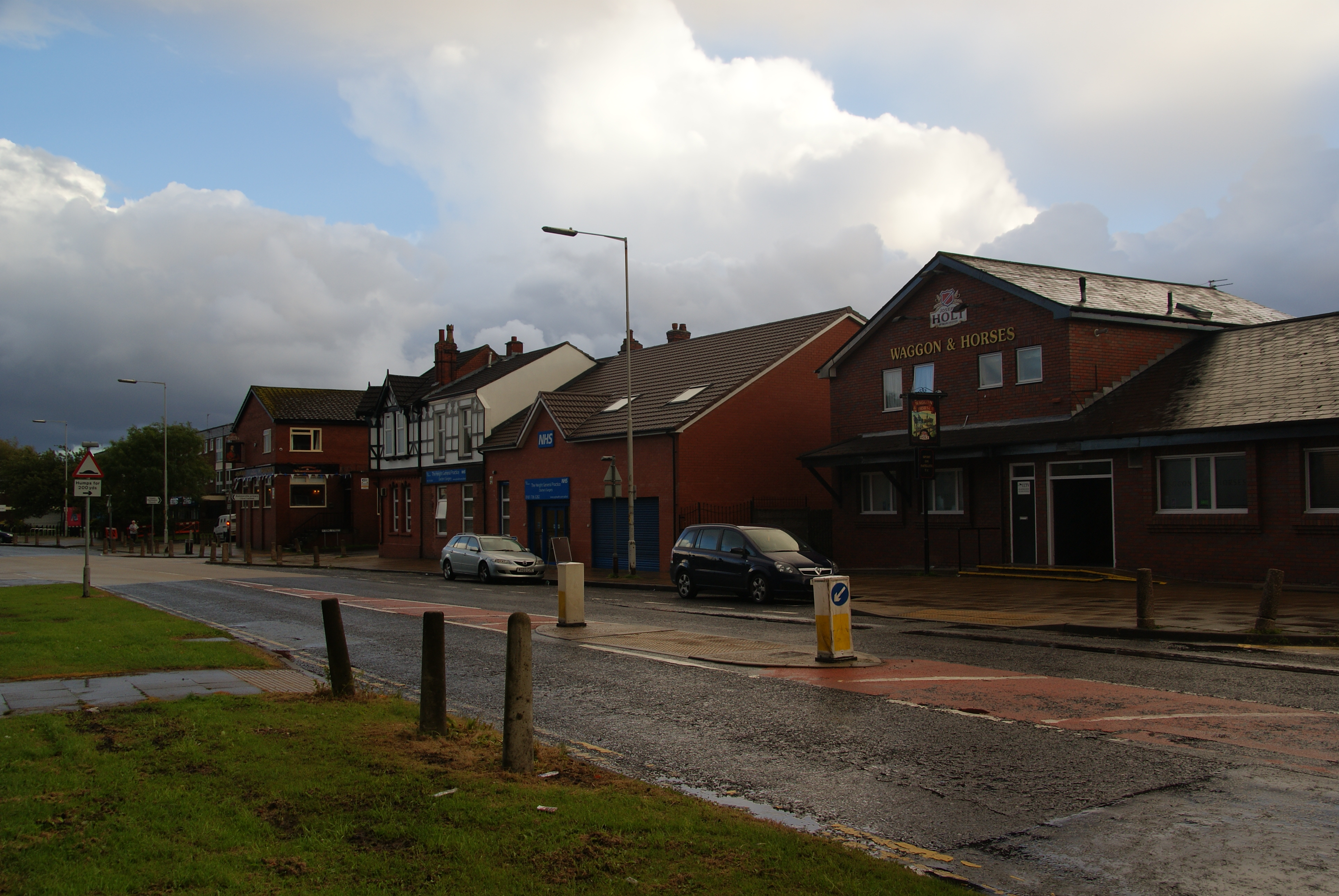
The Waggon and Horses (right) and The Wellington (left) public houses on Bolton Road, separated by a GP surgery.

There are three public houses currently on the Height; all are operated by Joseph Holt's Brewery:

- Red Lion, Bolton Road
- The Wellington, Bolton Road
- Waggon and Horses, Bolton Road

The Dog and Partridge (Bolton Road) was closed and was converted into the Height General Practice.

=== Parks ===
- Lightoaks Park, Claremont Road
- Oakwood Park, Swinton Park Road

=== Library ===
Height Library is located on King Street; it is open daily except Sundays and Mondays.
