= Pendlebury railway station =

Former railway station in England

Pendlebury
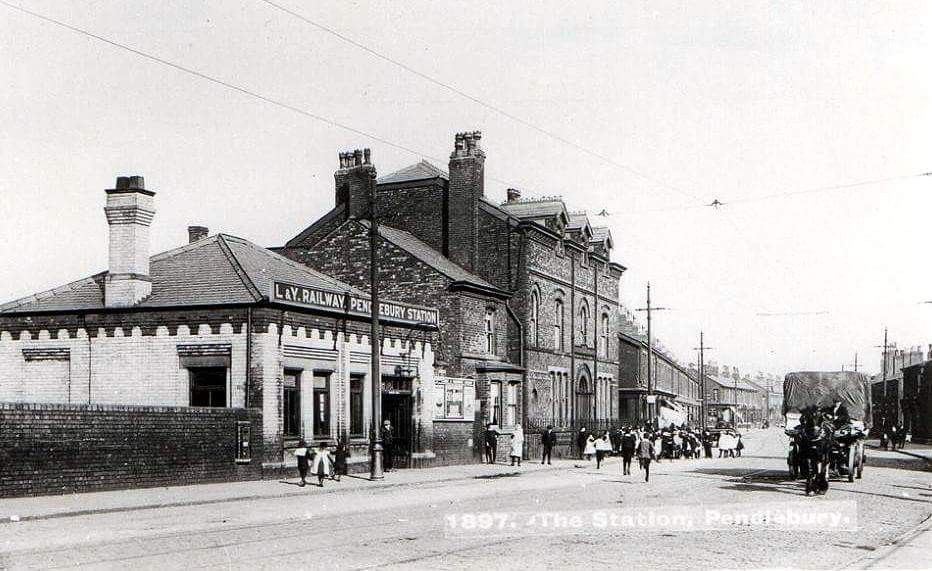
- Pendlebury railway station in 1897

General information
- Location: Pendlebury, City of Salford; England
- Coordinates: 53.511984°N 2.320476°W
- Platforms: 2

Other information
- Status: Disused

History
- Pre-grouping: Lancashire and Yorkshire Railway
- Post-grouping: London, Midland and Scottish Railway

Key dates
- 13 June 1887: Opened
- 3 October 1960: Closed
Location

Pendlebury railway station was a station serving the town of Pendlebury in the City of Salford, Greater Manchester, England. It was closed in 1960 by British Railways.

== History ==
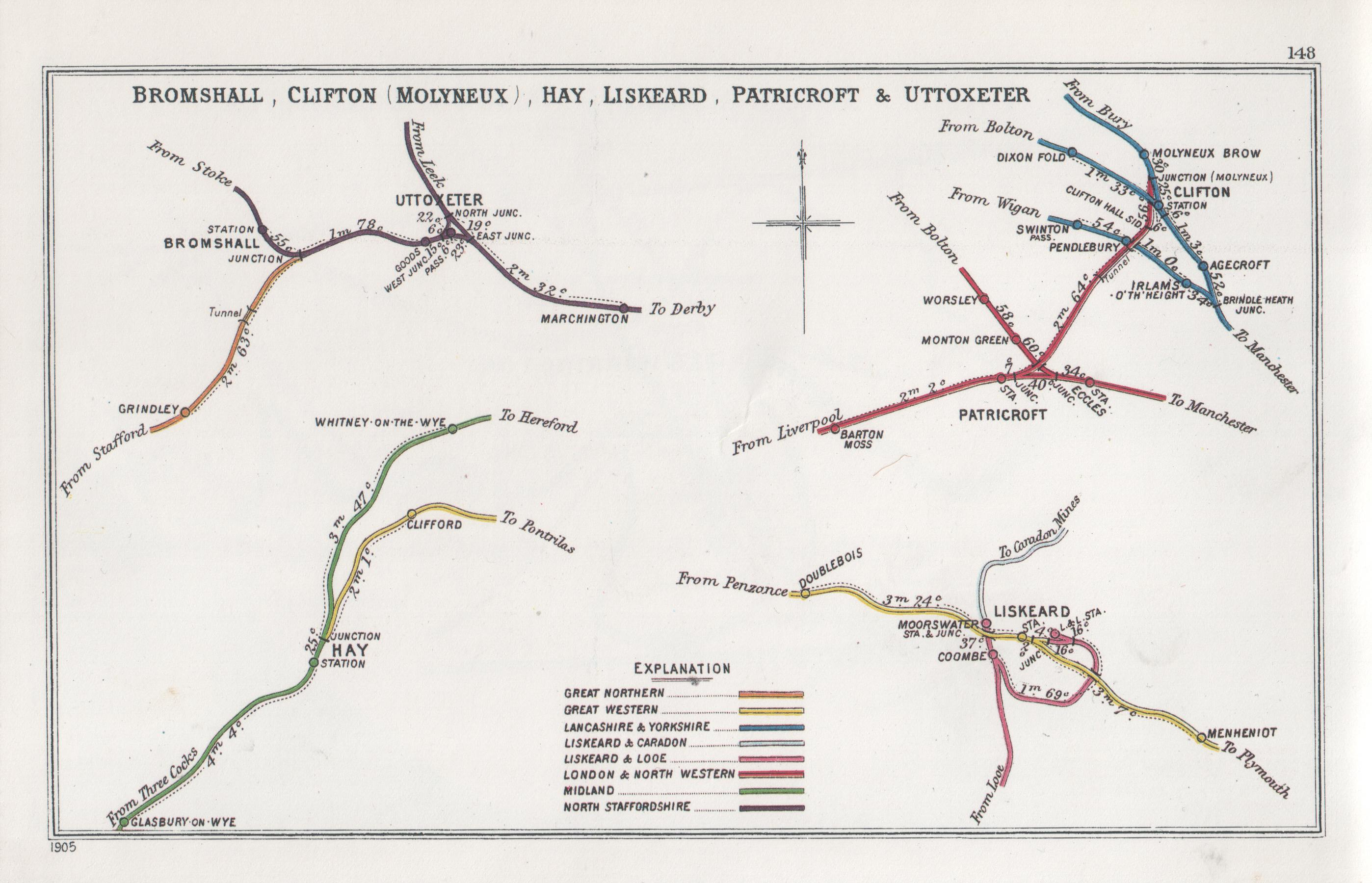
A 1905 Railway Clearing House Junction Diagram showing (upper right) railways in the vicinity of Pendlebury

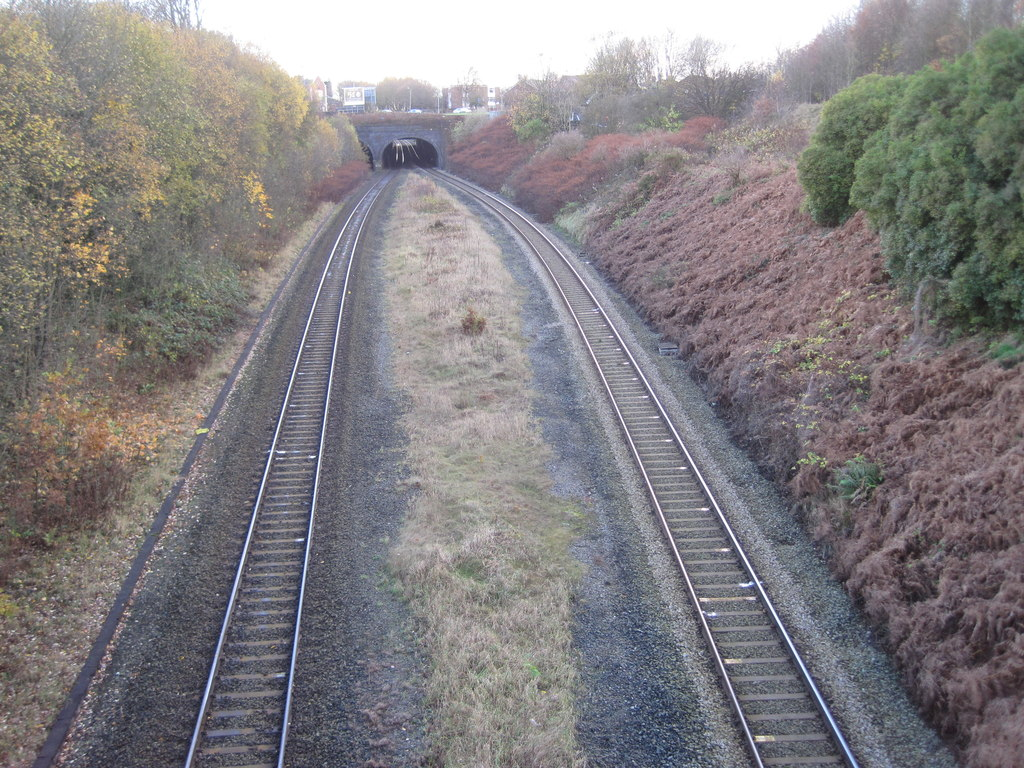
The site of the former Pendlebury railway station (pictured in 2012)

The station started life as part of the Lancashire and Yorkshire Railway's Pendleton and Hindley line that grew into (and still exists today as) the Manchester Victoria to Wigan Wallgate line. Heading from Manchester towards Wigan, the preceding station was at Irlams o' th' Height (closed in 1956), and the following station was at Swinton (still open). Pendlebury station was closed in 1960. The existing lines still widen where the island platform existed (removed in 1978). By 1922, ownership had passed from the Lancashire and Yorkshire Railway, to the London, Midland and Scottish Railway, and upon nationalisation in 1948 it became property of British Railways.

It was located on Bolton Road (A666), opposite St. Augustine's Church and the former (appropriately named) Station Hotel pub which is nowadays the Trattoria Italian restaurant. The railway station was about 760 yards east of the present-day Swinton railway station. The station was located just before the entrance to a tunnel underneath Bolton Road. From the site of the station the tunnel goes as far as Swinton Hall Road where it comes out and into a cutting on its way towards Swinton. A 1909 Ordnance Survey map shows no buildings on top of the tunnel's location, suggesting that it was not stable to be built upon at this time. In the Black Harry Tunnel collapse of 1953, part of the tunnel collapsed. Two houses fell into the resultant large void in Temple Drive, Swinton. Five people in the houses were killed.

The Swinton and Pendlebury Journal of 7 October 1960 reported that the last train to call at Pendlebury railway station was the 23:21 from Manchester Victoria to Wigan on the previous Saturday (1 October 1960) - there were 6 people aboard one of whom was a 37-year-old shopkeeper Mr Jackson, proprietor of 419 Chorley Road, Swinton. Mr Jackson reportedly bought the last ticket ever issued at Pendlebury station from the porter Mr D. White - a single to Swinton. Mr Jackson also reportedly travelled to Irlams o' th' Height on 3 March 1956 to purchase the last ticket issued there. A pub, the Station Hotel, was located on the opposite side of the road. The building still exists but has been refurbished into the Trattoria Italian restaurant. Some of the yellow brickwork of the station is still visible on Bolton Road.

== Station layout ==
The layout was four tracks wide, with an island platform serving two of the tracks being connected to Bolton Road via a footbridge. Several sets of points lay at the eastern end of the station. The Clifton Hall Tunnel (sometimes called the Black Harry Tunnel), part of the London and North Western Railway's Clifton Branch, ran underneath the eastern end of the station. There is a sign at the eastern end of the old platforms indicating to railway workers where the line of the old tunnel is.

== Cultural links ==
The artist L.S. Lowry lived at 117 Station Road (B5231), Pendlebury, about a mile from the station. Lowry recalled an inspirational moment at the station which transformed his view of the industrial landscape around him:

One day I missed a train from Pendlebury – [a place] I had ignored for seven years – and as I left the station I saw the Acme Spinning Company's mill… The huge black framework of rows of yellow-lit windows standing up against the sad, damp charged afternoon sky. The mill was turning out… I watched this scene — which I'd looked at many times without seeing — with rapture…

This experience led Lowry to incorporate elements of local textile mills and factory chimneys into many of his works, and elements of the Acme Mill can be seen in two of his iconic paintings: Coming from the Mill (1930) and The Mill, Pendlebury (1941).

In 1953, Lowry painted The Railway Platform, an oil on canvas depicting a scene of railway passengers standing on the platform at Pendlebury station. The painting was auctioned in 2015 for £1.6 million.

Lowry was filmed at Pendlebury station in documentary films made in the late 1950s, including a 1957 BBC documentary produced by John Read.

Preceding station	Historical railways	Following station
Swinton (Manchester); Line and station open	Lancashire and Yorkshire Railway; Manchester-Liverpool Main Line	Irlams o' th' Height; Line open, station closed
