= Agecroft Bridge railway station =

Former station on the Manchester, Bolton and Bury Railway

Agecroft Bridge

General information
- Location: Pendlebury, Salford; England
- Coordinates: 53.511°N 2.300°W
- Grid reference: SD802016

Other information
- Status: Disused

History
- Original company: Manchester, Bolton and Bury Railway
- Pre-grouping: Lancashire and Yorkshire Railway

Key dates
- 29 May 1838: Opened as Agecroft Bridge
- 1838: Renamed Agecroft; regular services ceased
- October 1857: Renamed Agecroft Bridge; regular services resumed
- January 1861: Station closed
Location

Agecroft Bridge railway station was on the Manchester, Bolton and Bury Railway. It served the town of Pendlebury in Greater Manchester (then Lancashire) in England. It also served the former Manchester Racecourse and Agecroft area of the town.

== History ==
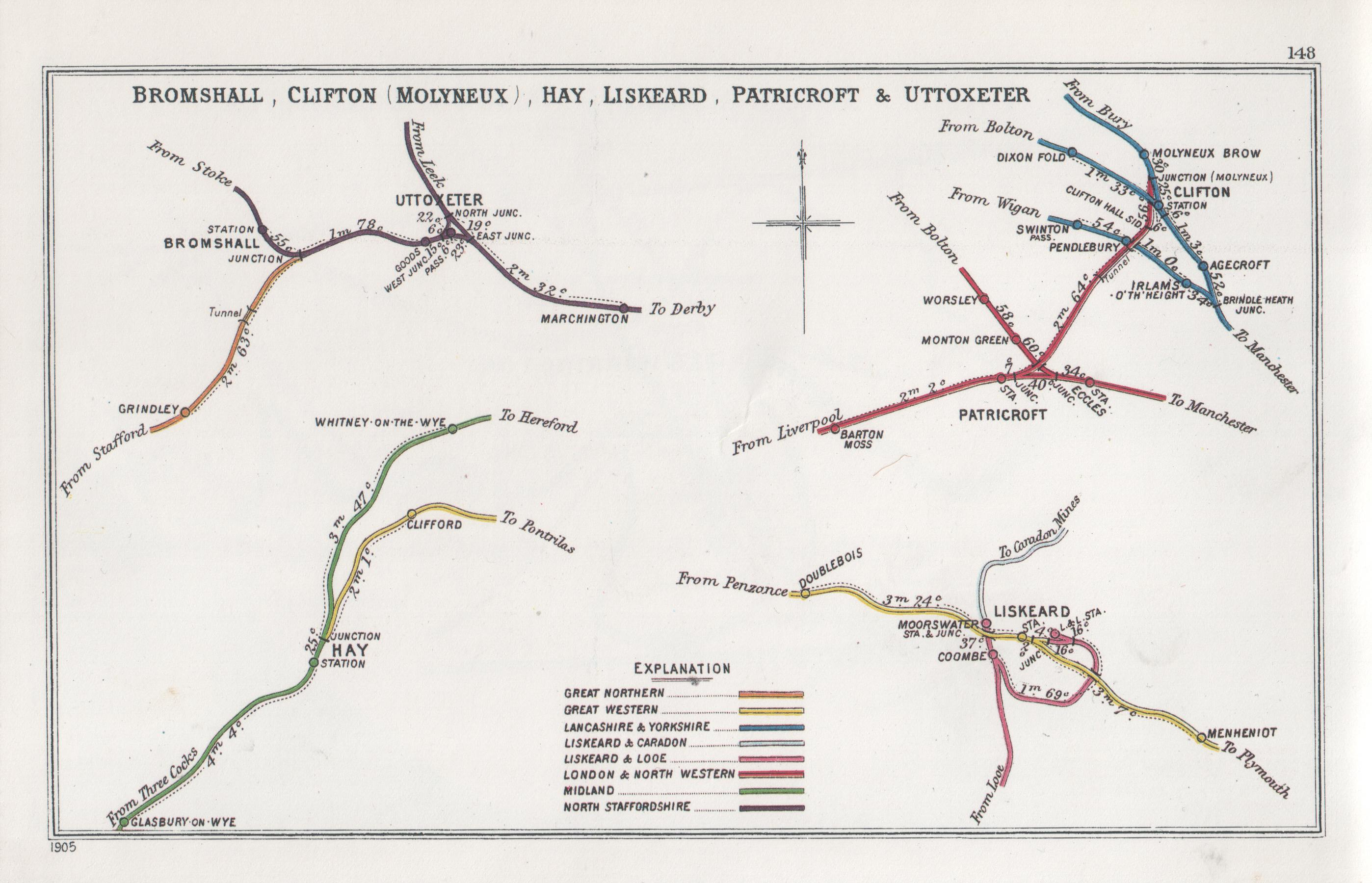
A 1905 Railway Clearing House Junction Diagram showing (upper right) railways in the vicinity of Agecroft Bridge (shown here as Agecroft)

The Manchester, Bolton and Bury Railway opened to the public on 29 May 1838, and Agecroft Bridge was one of two intermediate stations between Salford and Bolton, the other being Ringley. Later that year, regular passenger services ceased, but the station remained open for meetings at Manchester Racecourse; it was renamed Agecroft at this time. Regular services resumed in October 1857, as did the original name. The station closed permanently in January 1861.

Preceding station	Disused railways	Following station
Clifton Junction; Line and station open	Lancashire and Yorkshire Railway; Manchester and Bolton Railway	Pendleton; Line and station closed
Clifton Junction; Line and station open	Lancashire and Yorkshire Railway; Manchester and Bolton Railway	Pendleton Bridge; Line open, station closed
