= Agecroft =

Suburban area in Greater Manchester, England

Coordinates: 53.5105494°N 2.3055943°W

- Location within Greater Manchester
- OS grid reference: SD807070
- Metropolitan borough: Salford
- Metropolitan county: Greater Manchester
- Region: North West
- Country: England
- Sovereign state: United Kingdom
- Post town: MANCHESTER
- Postcode district: M27
- Dialling code: 0161
- Police: Greater Manchester
- Fire: Greater Manchester
- Ambulance: North West
- UK Parliament: Salford

Agecroft is a suburban area of Pendlebury, within the City of Salford, Greater Manchester, England. It lies within the Irwell Valley, on the west bank of the River Irwell and along the course of the Manchester, Bolton & Bury Canal. It comprises a section of Pendlebury's high ground bisected by the A6044 (Agecroft Road), its main thoroughfare; Kersal and Salford are across the river to the east. Agecroft Cemetery and HM Prison Forest Bank are in the area.

Historically a part of Lancashire, Agecroft emerged as a manor of Pendlebury.

With local government reforms in the 19th century, Agecroft became a constituent district of the Municipal Borough of Swinton and Pendlebury. Agecroft Bridge railway station was on the Manchester, Bolton and Bury Railway between 1838 and 1861; Agecroft Colliery opened as a commercial coal mine in 1844; and Agecroft Power Station was a coal-fired power station between 1925 and 1993.

== See also ==
- Agecroft Hall, a Tudor country house and park exported and rebuilt on the James River in Richmond, Virginia, US from Pendlebury
- Agecroft Rowing Club, based at Salford Quays, Salford, England, the largest non-academic rowing club in Greater Manchester
