= Clifton Hall Tunnel =

Railway tunnel in Greater Manchester, England

Coordinates: 53.508291°N 2.324754°W

Clifton Hall Tunnel, also called (locally) the Black Harry Tunnel, was a railway tunnel passing beneath much of Swinton and Pendlebury, in Greater Manchester, England. It was located on the Patricroft and Clifton branch of the London and North Western Railway line, linking Patricroft with Molyneux Junction.

Originally opened in 1850, the Clifton Hall Tunnel was heavily used by freight trains to and from Clifton Hall Colliery and other neighboring collieries. Construction had been complicated by the unstable ground, which had already been subject to mining. Throughout its operational life, it was subject to routine inspections and several rounds of remedial work aimed at stabilising sections of the tunnel roof, principally using steel ribbing. The neighbouring land around and above the tunnel was also subject to urbanisation, leading to housing being built directly above it.

The tunnel acquired a level of public infamy when it suffered a partial collapse on 28 April 1953, which resulted in the deaths of five occupants of houses in Temple Drive, Swinton, located directly above one of the construction shafts that had been infilled and forgotten about. No danger was posed to rail traffic as a temporary closure had already been enacted earlier that month following the discovery of debris in the tunnel. The tunnel was subsequently stabilised and largely infilled; further measures were taken during 2007, the 2010s and in 2025 to reinforce the closed tunnel and infill any remaining voids.

== History ==
=== Construction ===
The origins of the Clifton Hall Tunnel came out of a desire to develop a link between Clifton Hall Colliery and others in the vicinity. Railway industry periodical Rail Engineer noted that the tunnel was of an orthodox nature, with no inherently unique factors at play. While detailed drawings and other records relating to it were produced at the time of construction, these were largely destroyed during the 1940s and 1950s.

While there were no ventilation shafts in finished structure, a total of eight temporary construction shafts were driven and subsequently in-filled. Upon completion, the tunnel had a length of 1,298 yards, a width of 24 feet and 9 inches at its widest point, and a height of 22 feet and 3 inches between the top of the arched roof and the invert at its base. It was lined with brick throughout, principally using blue lias mortar; furthermore, a central drain was laid over the invert. It accommodated a pair of tracks throughout. The completed tunnel was inspected by Captain G. Wynne on 29 October 1849 ahead of entered service.

=== Operational use ===
During 1850, both the tunnel and the line were opened in to traffic. Once operational, the line provided a strategically important link to Radcliffe via the Clifton Viaduct.

During 1901, a length of 272 yards of the tunnel was strengthened via the addition of steel ribs made from reused old rails, spaced at intervals of five feet; similar ribs were installed along another section of the tunnel in 1926; these measures were taken due to concerns of potential subsidence due to coal workings. It was primarily used by freight traffic, although a small number of passenger trains were also operated along the route prior to the Second World War. During the conflict, traffic through the tunnel was temporarily halted.

Following the Second World War, the tunnel was never again used by passenger trains. During October 1947, it was reopened for a limited number of freight services. The structure was patched several times across its first century of use, resulting in irregular brickwork and construction joints throughout, hindering inspection. The land around the tunnel was developed considerably during its operational years; originally being agricultural purposes, it was urbanised and incorporated in the town of Swinton.

The northern portal is situated close to Clifton Junction, where the line ran under the Manchester-Preston Line, the station providing an interchange. After passing over the Clifton Viaduct and through the station, the line entered the tunnel, which took a straight route under the Manchester-Southport line just to the east of Pendlebury railway station. The tunnel continued very close to St Augustine's Church, Pendlebury, under Temple Drive and the extreme south east corner of Victoria Park until it reached its southern portal in a cutting just beyond the then Swinton cricket ground (Barton Road) between Dorchester Road and Overdale.

=== Collapse ===
On 13 April 1953, 15 days prior to the main incident, several elements of brickwork fell from the roof of the tunnel at the site of an undocumented construction shaft. Immediate steps taken included the enactment of a stoppage on all rail traffic through the tunnel and daily inspections of the affected area to observe any further degradation. While preparations for emergency strengthening of the tunnel via the addition of ribbing were underway, such measures had not been implemented by the date of a more substantial collapse.

On 28 April 1953, the Clifton Hall Tunnel partially collapsed. The precise point of the collapse was directly beneath an old brick-lined construction shaft, the contents of which fell into the space below. The surrounding soil, which was a loose mixture of sand and clay, poured into the void and formed a large cavity underneath the foundations of two houses on Temple Drive. The houses, (numbers 22 and 24) suddenly collapsed into the ground killing five occupants; the end wall of another house fell outwards, though the occupants of this property were rescued.

An official inquiry into the incident was conducted. A report compiled in 1954 concluded that timber shoring intended for temporary use during construction may have been left in place and had gradually degraded in the damp conditions; resulting in the tunnel's arch ring having to carry the full weight (roughly 200 tons) of wet sand in the filled-in construction shaft. It also ruled out mining activity as having played any attributable role in the collapse. Furthermore, that repeated recommendations by assistant chief works inspector H. Bradley for the tunnel's strengthening had been postponed, partially due to questions over the line's potential singling or closure, as well as restrictive funding available for such works.

=== Aftermath ===
The collapsed tunnel was determined to be in such a condition, particularly in regards to its brickwork, that extensive, and costly, remedial works would have been necessary to render it usable to rail traffic once again. Thus, decision makers quickly came to favour its permanent closure. Despite this, emergency reinforcement measures were carried out. Several years following the collapse, it was decided to fill in the tunnel using spoil and other waste materials produced by one of the nearby collieries. As a result of this infilling, the structure's portals are both buried and cannot be seen, however the route of the railway can still be made out by cuttings and embankments, especially when viewed on an aerial map.

During the 2010s, civil engineering company M & J Drilling were contracted to stabilise the Clifton Hall Tunnel by grouting compromised sections. To support this activity, a comprehensive 3D subsurface laser scan survey was performed by Geoterra to ascertain the specifics and condition of the tunnel, which was accessed via a series of 100mm vertical shafts which were bored from the surface. Following the infilling of voids, further remedial work was undertaken.

In 2025, more than 70 years after the tragedy, further precautionary works were undertaken by contractor AmcoGiffen to ensure the tunnel site remains safe. Drill holes were made to allow 3D laser scans of the remaining voids. These were in-filled with approximately 2,200 tonnes of material pumped into the cavities.
