= Irlams o' th' Height railway station =

Former railway station in England

Irlams o' th' Height
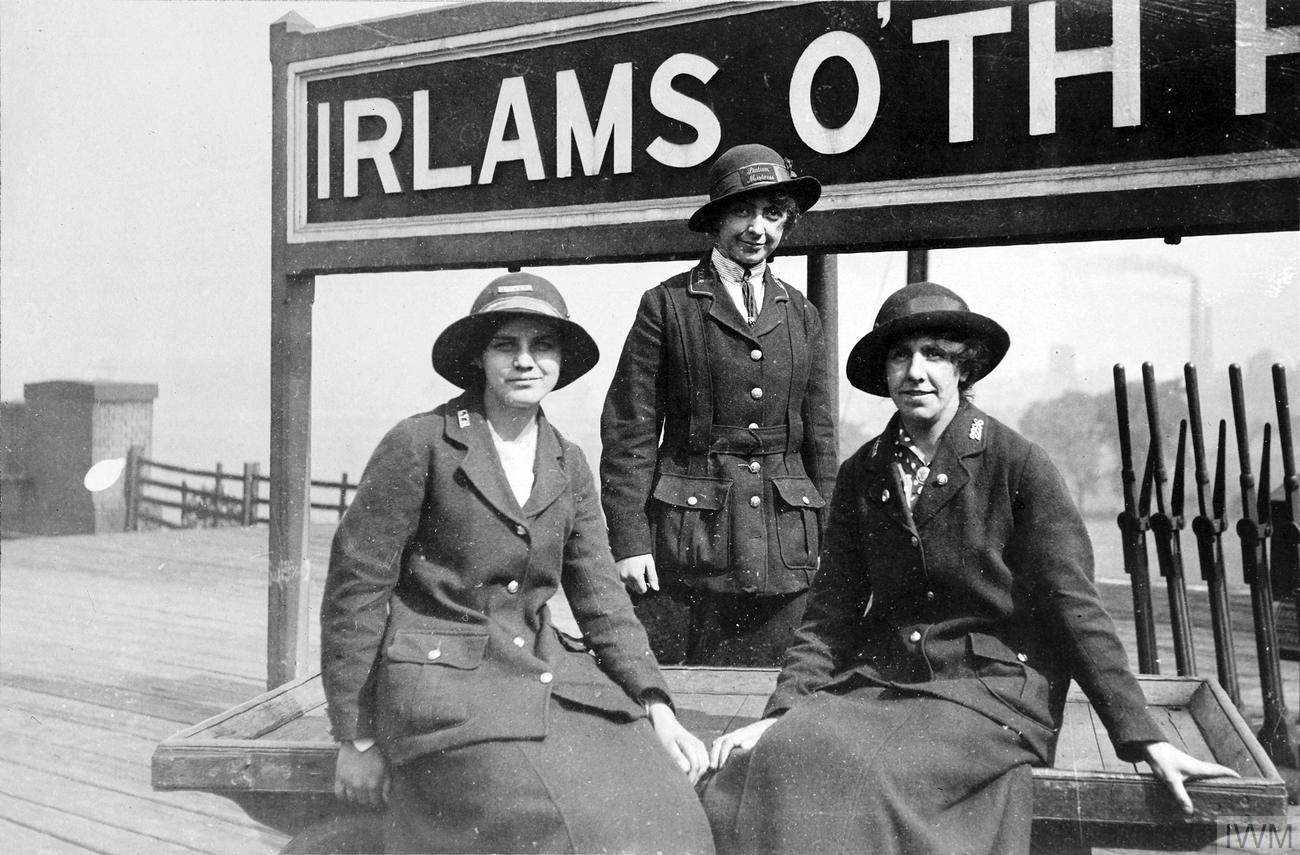
- Station Mistress and two porters at Irlams o' th' Height railway station, 1917

General information
- Location: Irlams o' th' Height, City of Salford; England
- Coordinates: 53.504°N 2.303°W
- Platforms: 2

Other information
- Status: Disused

History
- Original company: Lancashire and Yorkshire Railway
- Pre-grouping: Lancashire and Yorkshire Railway
- Post-grouping: London, Midland and Scottish Railway

Key dates
- 1 July 1901: Opened
- 5 March 1956: Closed
Location

Irlams o' th' Height railway station was located on the Atherton Line between Manchester Victoria and Wigan Wallgate. The railway station was opened by the Lancashire and Yorkshire Railway on 1 July 1901, some 14 years after the Atherton Line had opened in 1888. The station closed on 5 March 1956. The preceding station was Pendleton, the following station was Pendlebury, also both since demolished.

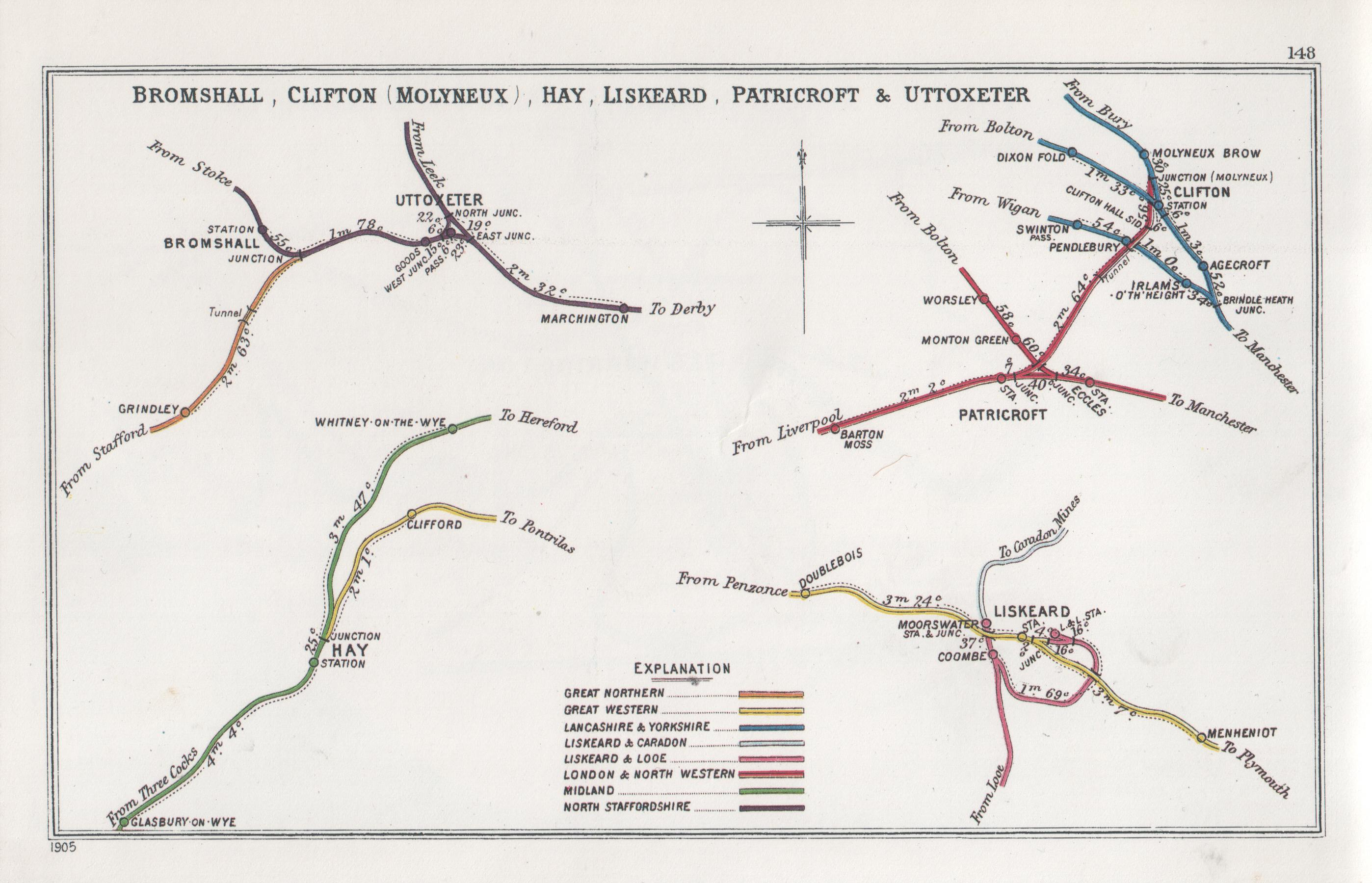
A 1905 Railway Clearing House Junction Diagram showing (upper right) railways in the vicinity of Irlams o' th' Height

The station was located at the bottom of Bank Lane (just over the boundary in Pendlebury), however this was to prove to be the station's downfall, as it was located too far away from the main population centre of Irlams o' th' Height. Although isolated from the population centre, the station was located close to various factories, as well as the extensive Agecroft Locomotive Shed (demolished in 1968).

The station's construction differed from all the others along the line, its being constructed of planks of wood (both platform and buildings) rather than the usual yellow brick which is the standard along the line.

The station was noteworthy because the station was staffed entirely by women during the First World War.

Preceding station	Disused railways	Following station
Pendlebury	L&YR; Manchester to Southport Line	Pendleton
