= Pendleton Bridge railway station =

Former railway station in England

Pendleton Bridge

General information
- Location: Pendleton, Salford; England
- Coordinates: 53.4937°N 2.2829°W
- Grid reference: SJ813997
- Platforms: 2

Other information
- Status: Disused

History
- Original company: Manchester and Bolton Railway
- Pre-grouping: Lancashire and Yorkshire Railway
- Post-grouping: London, Midland and Scottish Railway

Key dates
- September 1843: Opened as Pendleton Bridge
- ?: Renamed Pendleton
- 5 December 1966: Closed
Location

Pendleton Bridge railway station was a railway station in Pendleton, Salford built on the Manchester and Bolton Railway, between Salford and Clifton Junction. The station was accessed from Station Street, just west of Broughton Road (A576). It was unusual in having a canal, the Manchester, Bolton & Bury Canal, running alongside the station behind the up (southbound) platform.

This station has been known by at least two names: originally opened as Pendleton Bridge in September 1843, it has also been known as Pendleton Old, and by the time of its closure on 5 December 1966, was known simply as Pendleton. The other station in Pendleton, near the church, was known as Pendleton Broad Street until Pendleton Bridge closed.

The station no longer exists.

Preceding station	Historical railways	Following station
Agecroft Bridge; Line open, station closed	Lancashire and Yorkshire Railway; Manchester and Bolton Railway	Windsor Bridge, Pendleton; Line open, station closed
