= Coming from the Mill =

1930 painting by Laurence Stephen Lowry

- Artist: Laurence Stephen Lowry
- Year: 1930
- Medium: oil on canvas
- Movement: Naïve art
- Subject: Human figures in front of a composite landscape of textile mills in Pendlebury
- Dimensions: 42 cm × 52 cm (17 in × 20 in)
- Location: The Lowry, Salford
- Accession: 1941-8

Coming from the Mill is an oil-on-canvas painting created in 1930 by British painter Laurence Stephen Lowry.

== Artist ==
Laurence Stephen Lowry (1887–1976) often painted his surroundings in Pendlebury, Lancashire in the United Kingdom, where he lived and worked for more than 40 years. His fame lies in images from the industrial districts in the northwest of England from the mid-1900s. He developed a painting style of cityscapes with people, often described as "matchstick men". He also painted mysterious unpopulated landscapes and discordant portraits.

He is sometimes referred to as naïvist and often got to hear, to his annoyance, that he was a self-taught amateur "Sunday painter".

== Description ==
Coming from the Mill shows workers going home from a factory after the end of their shift. The human figures are painted in Lowry's characteristic style of "matchstick figures", filing out through the factory gates in large numbers. In the foreground, a horse-drawn carriage and a handcart are visible on the street in front of a row of terraced houses, and large cotton mill buildings and factory chimneys loom in the background, above a distant church steeple.

== History ==
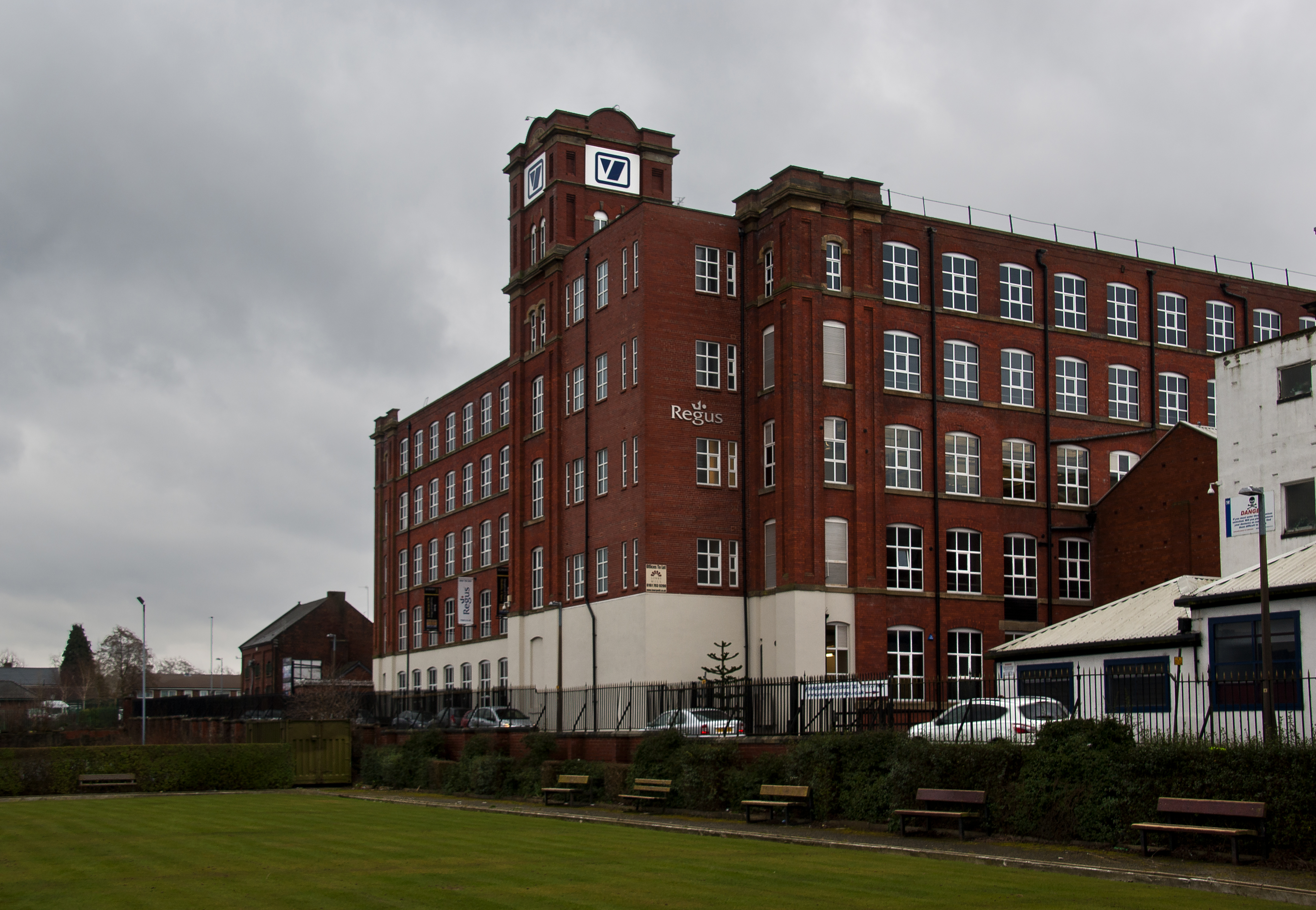
Elements of the Acme cotton mill in Pendlebury (demolished 1984) are evident in the painting

External videos
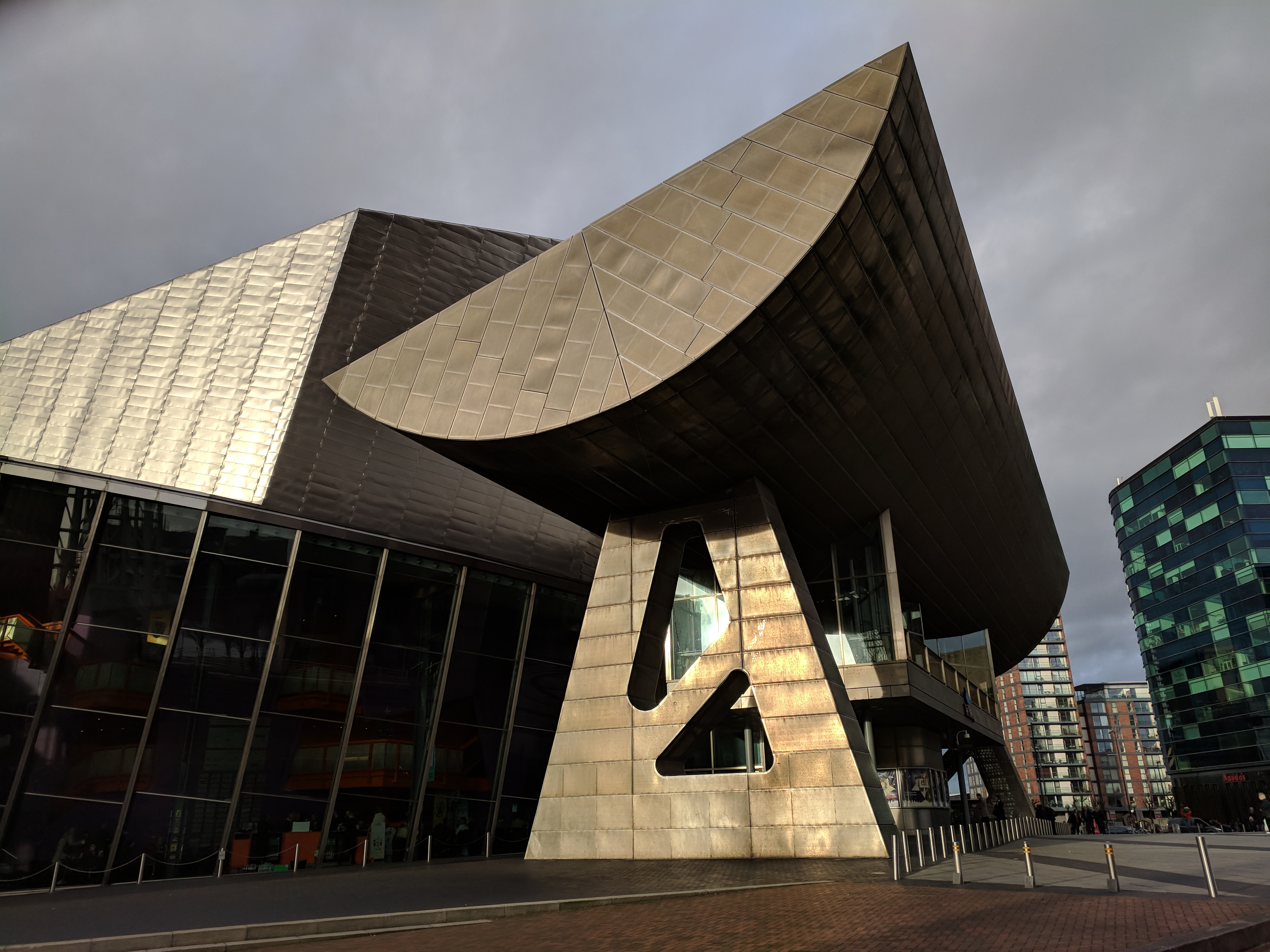
- The Lowry video about Coming from the Mill

Coming from the Mill does not depict a real factory, but rather a composite scene consisting of individual buildings with real details from Lowry's imagination. Lowry based many of his paintings on the industrial landscape of Pendlebury, Salford, where he lived for part of his early life. Lowry recalled an inspirational moment at Pendlebury railway station: "One day I missed a train from Pendlebury – [a place] I had ignored for seven years – and as I left the station I saw the Acme Spinning Company's mill… The huge black framework of rows of yellow-lit windows standing up against the sad, damp charged afternoon sky. The mill was turning out… I watched this scene – which I'd looked at many times without seeing – with rapture…" This experience led Lowry to incorporate elements of local textile mills and factory chimneys into many of his works, and elements of the Acme Mill can be seen in Coming from the Mill.

Lowry created an early pastel and pencil sketch of Coming from the Mill around 1917–18. Although recognisably the same scene, differences with his 1930 painting are evident; his refinements to the composition include the addition of a church steeple and the removal of a brewery tower in the background. This 1917 drawing is noted as one of Lowry's earliest mill scenes. Lowry re-used this composition in a 1928 painting, Coming Home from the Mill, which is now in the collection of the Manchester Art Gallery.

The 1930 version of Coming from the Mill, painted some 13 years later, is evidence of a change in Lowry's use of light. Writing in the Manchester Guardian, his former tutor at the Salford School of Art, Bernard D. Taylor, criticised Lowry's paintings for being too dark. Taylor's criticism led Lowry to make greater use of light backgrounds such as that used in his 1930 reworking of Coming from the Mill.

The 1930 Coming from the Mill is noted for Lowry's subtle use of colour, with mixes of yellow ochre and vermilion blended to incorporate hues of peach, dusky reds and rose pinks. The dark colours used to depict the human figures contrast sharply with the off-white background, and the large, dark blocks of the mill buildings looming in the background have been likened to the wings of a theatre stage, framing the scene. Raking light analysis also reveals Lowry's technique of using a knife to cut into the paint surface to create a sense of luminescence and to increases the contrast between individual elements and the background. The horse-drawn vehicles in the foreground of both versions of Coming from the Mill show the influence of his tutor at the Manchester School of Art, Pierre Adolphe Valette.

=== Provenance ===
Coming from the Mill was bought from the artist by Salford Museum and Art Gallery in 1941. In a letter to the gallery Lowry wrote, "It gives me great pleasure that Salford have bought this picture for I have always thought it was my most characteristic mill scene." With the opening of The Lowry at Salford Quays, Coming from the Mill – along with the gallery's entire collection of Lowry works – was transferred to the new art centre.
