= List of mills in Salford =

This is a list of the cotton and other textile mills in the City of Salford, Greater Manchester, England.

== The mills ==
Name	Architect	Location	Built	Demolished	Served (Years)
Acme Mill		Swinton Hall Road, Pendlebury SD78501653°30′40″N 2°19′34″W	1905	1984	79
	Notes: First Lancashire mill driven solely by electricity 1905-Acme Spinning Co; 1919-Amalgamated Cotton Mills Trust; 1930- Subject of L. S. Lowry's painting Coming from the Mill; 1943-"The Mill, Pendlebury" 1959-Acme Spinning Co ceased production.				
Agecroft Works		Langley Road, Pendlebury SD807012 53°30′25″N 2°17′31″W			
Albert Mill		Pendleton SD808003 53°29′56″N 2°17′28″W			
	Notes: Armitage and Co, 810 looms				
Albion Mill		Swinton Hall Road, Pendlebury SD785016 53°30′40″N 2°19′34″W			
Bank Mill		Lissadel Street, Pendleton SJ815997 53°29′38″N 2°16′48″W			
	Notes: 1891-John Johnson and Sons, 304 looms				
Bedingate Mill		Leigh Street, Salford SJ76298453°28′55″N 2°21′36″W			
Bridge Mill		Holland Street, Pendleton SD810001 53°29′49″N 2°17′17″W			
	Notes: 1891-Thomas Livesey, 612 looms				
Bridgewater Mill		Atkin Street, Walkden SD739029 53°31′19″N 2°23′42″W	1879		146
	Notes: 1891-John Booth and Co, 112 looms				
Bridgewater Mill		Newtown, Pendlebury			
	Notes: 1891-Ermen and Co, 41,000 spindles				
Bridgewater Mill		Legh Street, Eccles 53°28′54″N 2°21′35″W			
	Notes:				
Clegg's Lane Mill		SD720043 53°32′06″N 2°25′26″W			
Clough Works		SJ830994 53°29′28″N 2°15′29″W			
Deans Mill		Moorside, Swinton SD771015 53°30′36″N 2°20′49″W			
	Notes: 1891-Simpson and Godlee, 440 looms				
Eccles Spinning and Manufacturing Co	Potts, Son and Hennings	Canalside, Winton SJ 762 990 53°29′13″N 2°21′40″W		1906	
	Notes: Built 1906; Great Universal Stores; 2013- Demolished; Engine: 1500hp vertical triple expansion engine by George Saxon & Co				
Egerton Mill		Ordsall Lane, Salford			
	Notes: 1891-Richard Howarth and Co				
Egerton Works		SJ 762 985 53°28′59″N 2°21′36″W			
	Notes: 1891-William Crippin, 275 looms				
Glazebury Mill		SJ 764 982 53°28′48″N 2°21′25″W			
Granville Mill		Bolton Road, Walkden SD 735 036 53°31′41″N 2°24′04″W	1861		164
	Notes: Whittaker; 1879-John Faulkner; 1891- John Faulkner, 4000 spindles 1985-Closed				
Grecian Mill		SD 736 046 53°32′13″N 2°24′00″W			
Hazelhurst Mills		Hazelhurst Road, Worsley			
Hope Mill aka Lane's Mill		Sandwich Street, Walkden SD 739 028 53°31′16″N 2°23′42″W	1879		146
	Notes: Edwin Lane; 1891-E. Lane and Sons, 60 looms				
Hope Mill		SD 779 018 53°30′43″N 2°20′06″W			
Irwell Bleach Works		Douglas Green, Pendleton SD 815 004 53°30′00″N 2°16′48″W			
Islington Mill,		James Street, Salford SJ 826 984 53°28′55″N 2°15′50″W			
King Street Mill		SJ 835 989 53°29′13″N 2°15′00″W			
Kingston Mills		Cobden Street, Pendleton 53°29′42″N 2°17′13″W			
	Notes: 1891-Turner Wright and Son (together with Trafford Mill), 72,000 spindles				
Lakefield Mills		SD 720 043 53°32′06″N 2°25′26″W			
Lakefield Mills		SD 736 045 53°32′10″N 2°24′00″W			
Linnyshaw Mill		Manchester Road, Linnyshaw, Walkden SD 747 031 53°31′26″N 2°22′59″W	1874	in use	
	Notes: 1891- E. Bothwell, 300 looms 2016- Multiple use				
London Place Works		SD807 012 53°30′25″N 2°17′31″W			
Monton Mill		SJ 736 994 53°29′28″N 2°23′56″W	1906	Demolished	
	Notes: 1906-Monton Mill Co; 1930-Lancashire Cotton Corporation; 1964-Courtaulds c.1966-Ward and Goldstone				
Moorside Road Mill		Moorside, Swinton SD769 022 53°30′58″N 2°21′00″W			
	Notes: 1891-Holdsworth and Gibb, Limited, 26,000 throstle spindles; 322 looms				
Moss House Works		SJ823 992 53°29′20″N 2°16′05″W			
Moss Side Mills		Little Moss Lane, Pendlebury SD778 028 53°31′16″N 2°20′10″W			
Mossley Mill		Pendleton SJ 814 996 53°29′35″N 2°16′55″W			
	Notes: 1891-Sewell and Hulton, 600 looms				
Nassau Mills		Cawdor Street, Patricroft SJ 765 983 53°28′52″N 2°21′22″W			
	Notes: 1891-Ermen and Roby				
Newtown Mill		Lees Street, Newtown, Pendlebury SD778 024 53°31′05″N 2°20′10″W	1883	in use	
	Notes: 1891-John Knowles and Sons, 70,000 spindles c.1928-Featured in L S Lowry painting "Newton Mill and Bowling Club"; 1930-Lancashire Cotton Corporation; 1964-Dorma Group (Coats Viyella); 2016-Vanguard Holdings, office accommodation (renamed Lowry Mill)				
Overbridge Mills		SJ834 995 53°29′31″N 2°15′07″W			
Park Mill		Brackley Street, Walkden SD 734 036 53°31′41″N 2°24′11″W	1865		160
	Notes: 1865-Farnworth Cotton Spinning and Manufacturing Co; 1891-42,900 spindles 1932-Boiler explosion. Closed; 1935-Burtons the Tailors				
Parkhouse Works		Langley Road South, Pendleton SD807 008 53°30′14″N 2°17′31″W			
Pendleton New Mills		Broughton Road, Pendleton SJ813 998 53°29′42″N 2°16′59″W			
	Notes: 1891-Sir Elkanah Armitage and Sons, Limited,(together with Victoria Mill, Patricroft), 80,000 spindles, 2000 looms				
Primrose Mill		Campbell Street, Walkden SD 735 034 53°31′37″N 2°24′04″W	1869		156
	Notes: 1869-Andrew Rothwell; 1874-Dacca Twist Co (John Ryland); 1888-Rothwell Bros; 1891-W. A. Rothwell, 180 looms				
Riverside Works		SD810 007 53°30′11″N 2°17′17″W			
Salford Twist Mill		SJ834 985 53°28′59″N 2°15′07″W	1799–1801		
	Notes: Philips and Lee				
Salford works		SJ 832 992 53°29′20″N 2°15′18″W			
Springfield Mills		SJ 834 995 53°29′31″N 2°15′07″W			
Togo Mill		Patricroft SJ 765 600 53°28′40″N 2°21′12″W	1907	Demolished	
	Notes: 1907-Togo Spinning Co; 1920-Barton Bridge Mills c.1933-Lancashire Cotton Corporation; 1937-Co-op bakery Later used as a mail order warehouse				
Trafford Mill		Orchard Street, Pendleton SJ 811 999 53°29′42″N 2°17′10″W			
	Notes: 1891-Turner Wright and Son (together with Kingston Mills), 72,000 spindles				
Victoria Lane Mill		SD 767 016 53°30′40″N 2°21′11″W			
Victoria Mills		SJ 834 995 53°29′31″N 2°15′07″W			
Victoria Mills		St Luke's Road, Salford SJ 798 986 53°29′02″N 2°18′22″W			
Victoria Mills		Patricroft SJ 764 982 53°28′48″N 2°21′25″W			
	Notes: 1891-Sir Elkanah Armitage and Sons, Limited,(together with Pendleton Mill), 80,000 spindles, 2000 looms				
Walkden Mill		Bolton Road, Walkden	1862	1966	104
	Notes: 1891- H. and C. Cooke, 212 looms; William Walker, 104 looms and T. Wallwork and Son, 64 looms 1907-New Mill built with 86,000 spindles 1925-Combined Egyptian Mills Ltd; 1959-Closed; 2016-Site of Tesco Supermarket				
Walker's Silk Mill		SJ 825 983 53°28′52″N 2°15′54″W			
Wardley Mill		Manchester Road, Walkden SD 749 031 53°31′26″N 2°22′48″W	1878		147
	Notes: 1891-Burgess Ledward, 550 looms				
Waverley Mills		Cottenham Lane, Salford SJ 833 994 53°29′28″N 2°15′11″W			
	Notes: 1891-Joseph Phythian				
Willow Bank Works		Pendleton SD 810 007 53°30′11″N 2°17′17″W			
	Notes: 1891- Henry Entwisle and Sons, 200 looms				
Sources: * Williams & Farnie 1992, p. 196 * Graces Guide for 1891

== Bibliography ==
- Ashmore, Owen (1982). The industrial archaeology of North-west England. Manchester University Press. ISBN 0-7190-0820-4.
- Williams, Mike; Farnie (1992). Cotton Mills in Greater Manchester. Carnegie Publishing. ISBN 0-948789-89-1.
