= Pendlebury =

Town in Greater Manchester, England

Coordinates: 53.5075°N 2.3154°W

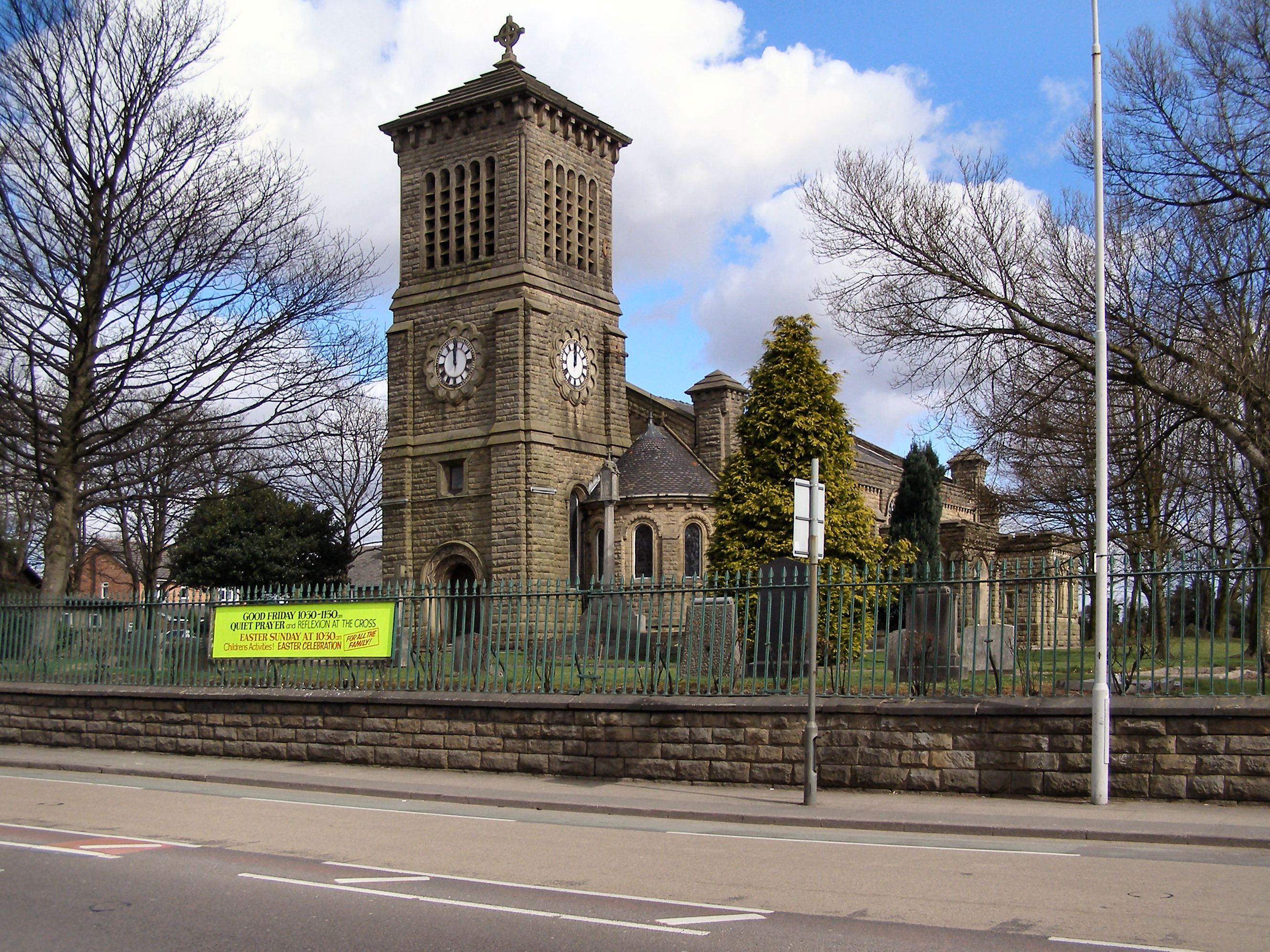
- St John's Church, Pendlebury

- Location within Greater Manchester
- Population: 13,069 (2011)
- OS grid reference: SD790012
  - London: 167 mi (269 km) SE
- Metropolitan borough: Salford
- Metropolitan county: Greater Manchester
- Region: North West
- Country: England
- Sovereign state: United Kingdom
- Post town: MANCHESTER
- Postcode district: M27
- Dialling code: 0161
- Police: Greater Manchester
- Fire: Greater Manchester
- Ambulance: North West
- UK Parliament: Salford

Pendlebury is a town in the City of Salford, Greater Manchester, England. The population at the 2011 Census was 13,069. It lies 4 miles (6 km) north-west of Manchester, 3 miles (5 km) north-west of Salford and 6 miles (10 km) south-east of Bolton.

Historically in Lancashire, Pendlebury, together with the neighbouring settlements of Swinton and Clifton, formed the municipal borough of Swinton and Pendlebury. Pendlebury saw extensive coal extraction from several collieries until the closure of Agecroft Colliery in the 1990s.

== History ==
=== Early history ===
Pendlebury is formed from the Celtic pen meaning hill and burh a settlement. The township was variously recorded as Penelbiri, Pennilbure, Pennebire and Pennesbyry in the 13th century, Penilburi in 1300, Penulbury in 1332; Penhulbury in 1358, Pendulbury in 1561 and Pendlebury after 1567.

In 1199 King John confirmed a gift of a carucate of land called Peneberi to Ellis son of Robert. He had made the grant when he was Count of Mortain (1189–99) and confirmed it when he became king in a deed signed at Le Mans in France. Ellis was described as Master Sergeant of Salford and a benefactor of Cockersand Abbey.

In 1201 Pendlebury was linked to the manor of Shoresworth to the south (described as "one oxgang of land") before Shoreworth became part of Pendleton. The manors of Pendlebury and Shoresworth were held of the king in thegnage by a rent of 12 shillings in 1212. Ellis died in or about 1216, and his son Adam succeeded to his manor and serjeanty. In 1274 Ellis, son of Roger came to a violent death, and Amabel, his widow claimed dower in various lands against Roger de Pendlebury. A short time afterwards, Amabel having received her dower, she and Roger de Pendlebury had to defend a suit brought by Adam de Pendlebury, who satisfied the jury of his title to the manor. Ellis had a brother, William and daughters Maud, Lettice and Beatrice. Maud married Adam son of Alexander de Pilkington of Pilkington, and had a daughter Cecily. The manor was sold before 1300 to Adam de Prestwich. The new lord of Pendlebury married Alice de Woolley daughter of Richard son of Henry de Pontefract, the eventual heir was his daughter Alice, wife of Jordan de Tetlow. Her heir was her daughter, Joan, who married Richard de Langley, and the manor descended with the Langleys until the end of the 16th century. Robert Langley died 19 September 1561, leaving four daughters as co-heirs. On the division of the estates, Agecroft, and lands in Pendlebury, became the portion of Anne, who married William Dauntesey, from Wiltshire. The manor of Pendlebury was claimed by the Daunteseys for some time, but was afterwards held with Prestwich, descending in the Coke family until about 1780, when it was sold to Peter Drinkwater of Irwell House, Prestwich.

=== Agecroft Hall ===
Agecroft Hall, the Tudor home of the Lord of the manor of Pendlebury, stood on rising ground on the west side of the River Irwell, where it flows southwards towards Salford and Manchester between the high ground of Kersal and Prestwich to the east and north, and Irlams o' th' Height and Pendlebury on the west. Building probably began towards the end of the reign of Henry VII. In 1666, of the thirty-five hearths liable for tax in Pendlebury, Agecroft Hall the only large house had eleven hearths.

At the end of the 19th century, industrialisation swept through the Irwell Valley. Collieries were sunk around Agecroft Hall, railway tracks cut across the manor and a dirty lake formed on the edge of the estate. The house fell into disrepair and was sold at auction in 1925 to Mr and Mrs Thomas C Williams. The structure was dismantled, crated, shipped across the Atlantic, and painstakingly reassembled in Windsor Farms, Richmond, Virginia, United States. Agecroft Hall is re-created as a tourist attraction on the banks of the James River, in a setting chosen to be reminiscent of its original site at Agecroft near the River Irwell.

The Langley name is remembered locally by having several streets, Langley Road, Langley Mill and Langley housing estate in Middleton named after the family. Agecroft Hall Estate is a recently built housing estate on Agecroft Road (A6044), named after the hall.

=== Industrial development ===
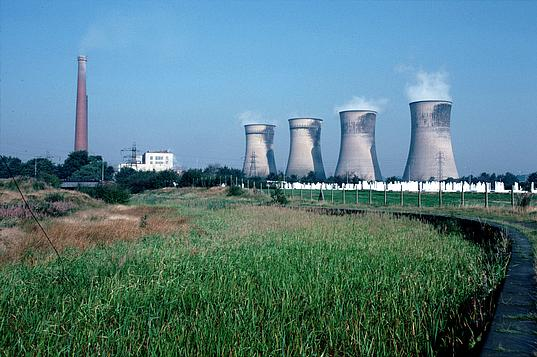
Agecroft Power Station in 1985 (since demolished)

Pendlebury saw extensive coal extraction until the closure of Agecroft Colliery in the 1990s. Wheatsheaf Colliery was on Bolton Road between Carrington Street and City Walk on what is now the Wheatsheaf Industrial Estate and Newtown Colliery (on the Clifton/Newtown, Pendlebury boundary, bounded by Manchester Road/Bolton Road (A666), Billy Lane, Rake Lane and the pit lodge ('the Dam'), which later became known as "Queensmere"). Agecroft Colliery reopened in 1960 following an investment of £9,000,000 and seven years of establishment works. Agecroft stood on the site of Lumn's Colliery which had an unusual arrangement of winding gear concealed in three huge towers – the tallest of which was 174 feet (53 m) high and which was abandoned in 1932. After 1947 Agecroft Colliery sent much of its coal to the CEGB's Agecroft Power Station, via a conveyor belt system that crossed a bridge over Agecroft Road. Mining finished in 1990, and the Agecroft Colliery site is now home to the Agecroft Commerce Park.

The Kearsley, Clifton, Pendlebury and Pendleton Miners' Association was established in 1888 and became the Pendlebury Branch of the National Union of Mineworkers in 1959. With the decline of the industry, the once popular Pendlebury Miners' Club (at the top of Temple Drive, Swinton) was demolished in the 1990s.

== Governance ==
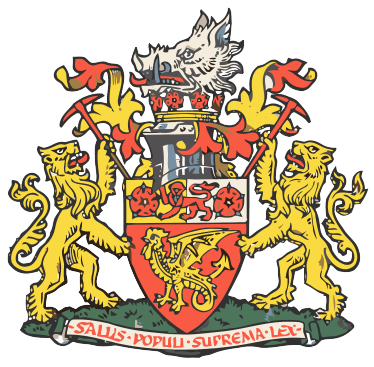
The coat of arms of the former Swinton and Pendlebury Municipal Borough Council. Swinton and Pendlebury was incorporated as a municipal borough in 1934.

Pendlebury was formerly a township in the parish of Eccles, in 1866 Pendlebury became a separate civil parish, 1 April 1933 the parish was abolished to form Swinton and Pendlebury. In 1931 the parish had a population of 9335.

Pendlebury was joined with Swinton in 1875 to form a local board of health area and was later governed by the Swinton and Pendlebury Urban District Council. Incorporation of Clifton into the Municipal Borough of Swinton and Pendlebury was a result of the abolition of the predecessor, Barton-upon-Irwell Urban District.

Swinton and Pendlebury was a municipal borough of the administrative county of Lancashire, which contained Pendlebury, Swinton and Clifton. It received a Charter of Incorporation from the 18th Earl of Derby on 29 September 1934 at a ceremony in Victoria Park, Swinton when council meetings were held in Victoria House in the park. The new borough council required larger premises and launched a competition to design a new town hall. The winners were architects Sir Percy Thomas and Ernest Prestwich. The site of Swinton Industrial Schools on Chorley Road in Swinton was purchased for £12,500 and the foundation stone of the new town hall laid on 17 October 1936. It opened on 17 September 1938 and since 1 April 1974 has been the administrative headquarters of the enlarged Salford City Council.

The Borough of Swinton and Pendlebury was amalgamated into the City of Salford in 1974 as a result of local government reforms.

In terms of parliamentary representation, the town was until 2010 part of the Eccles constituency. Since then it has been part of the Salford and Eccles constituency.

== Geography ==
Pendlebury is situated on a ridge overlooking the lower Irwell Valley, almost midway between Manchester and Bolton and is neighboured by Irlams o' th' Height, Pendleton and Clifton. Much of the boundary between Pendlebury and Clifton is defined by Slack Brook which was culverted many years ago after the area was used for landfill. Slack Brook eventually empties into the Irwell a short distance upstream from Agecroft Road Bridge (A6044). The surface of the land slopes generally upwards from southwest (Swinton) to northeast (Irwell Valley), from about 120 feet (40 m) to nearly 300 feet (90 m) above the ordnance datum. However, the topography of the land around Lumn's Lane has changed due to the dumping of mining waste from the former collieries and the area has been used as a landfill site by the Greater Manchester Waste Disposal Authority since 1982, taking ten percent of Greater Manchester's waste each year.

The town has a mix of industrial and residential areas despite the closure of its mines and most of its cotton mills.

== Economy ==
In the 19th century the manufacture and printing of cottons were the principal industries of the town, although most of these industries have disappeared. The only mill left is the Newtown Mill on Lees Street. It was acquired by Vanguard Holdings Ltd in January 2008 and converted into a business centre.

The Greater Manchester Fire and Rescue Service (Fire Brigade) has its headquarters on Bolton Road, between the junctions with Agecroft Road and Hospital Road.

Acme Mill was situated south of the Manchester-Wigan railway line on the eastern side Swinton Hall Road. It was demolished in the 1980s to make way for a small housing estate. Swinton Hall Road, between its junction with Bolton Road and the Swinton parish boundary, was originally called Bury Lane, and should not be confused with the original name of Station Road (B5231) – Burying Lane – which is the main road link between Swinton (A6) and Pendlebury (A666). The remaining section of Swinton Hall Road, between the Swinton parish boundary (near junction with Temple Drive) and Station Road, was known as Jane Lane.

The site of the demolished Agecroft Power Station is occupied by Forest Bank Prison. Development of the site of the former Agecroft Colliery into an industrial park has provided some employment in the town.

== Transport ==
=== Roads ===
Pendlebury is the starting point of the A666 Bolton Road, which runs through the district from its junction with the A6/A580 at the Pendlebury/Irlams o' th' Height boundary. It was the main route between Manchester and Bolton before the opening of the M61 motorway.

=== Waterways ===
The Manchester, Bolton and Bury Canal opened in 1809 and, during the 19th and early 20th centuries, provided the main means of transporting the coal from the collieries; many of these set up tramway links to the canal. Coal was taken to Bolton, Bury, Radcliffe and Salford, and across the River Irwell to Manchester. In 1905, over half a million tons of coal a year was carried. Lengths of the canal subsided due to mining subsidence; maps from 1881 to 1882 show areas of coal under the canal were bought by the canal company to safeguard it from subsidence.

The canal became disused after 1924 and closed in 1961, though coal was still carried for a short distance to Bury until 1968. A canal restoration society was founded in 1987 and persuaded Bury, Bolton and Salford councils to protect the line of the canal from development; restoration was announced by British Waterways in 2002.

=== Railway ===
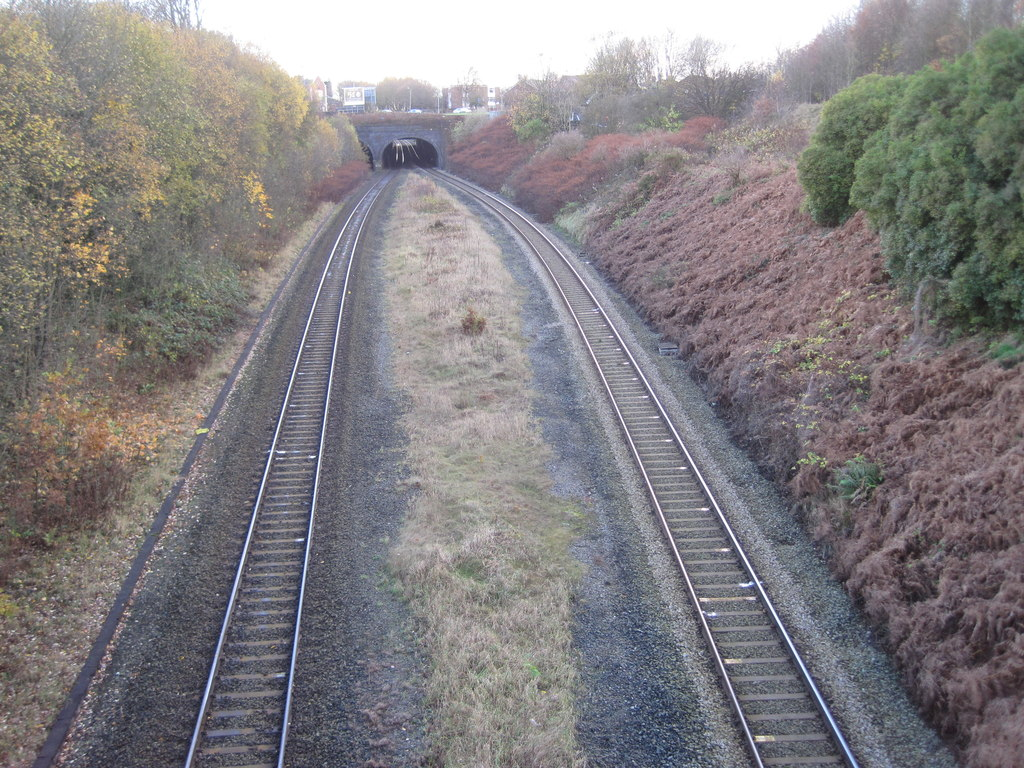
The site of the former station in 2012

The nearest railway station is Swinton, which is actually located on the Pendlebury side of the boundary. It is sited on the Manchester to Southport Line between Wigan and Manchester Victoria. Northern Trains operates regular services to Manchester, Wigan North Western, Wigan Wallgate, Blackburn and Leeds.

Pendlebury railway station was also sited on this line for over 80 years, until its closure on Saturday 1 October 1960 by British Railways due to low usage. Irlams o' th' Height railway station, in the eastern extremity of the borough, was closed for similar reasons four years earlier.

Pendlebury was on a line between Patricroft, on the Manchester to Liverpool line, and Clifton Junction, until the Black Harry Tunnel collapse of 1953; this caused five deaths when two houses from Temple Drive in Swinton collapsed into the void. The line never reopened and much of its length is now a recreational footpath.

== Landmarks ==
The 45-acre (18 ha) Northern or Agecroft Cemetery opened on 2 July 1903 by the County Borough of Salford (outside its boundaries) on the flood plain between Langley Road and the River Irwell by the border with Kersal. A crematorium was opened in the nonconformist burial chapel in 1957. A fund has been launched, supported by the council and external partners, to restore the unused central burial chapel which has fallen into a state of disrepair.

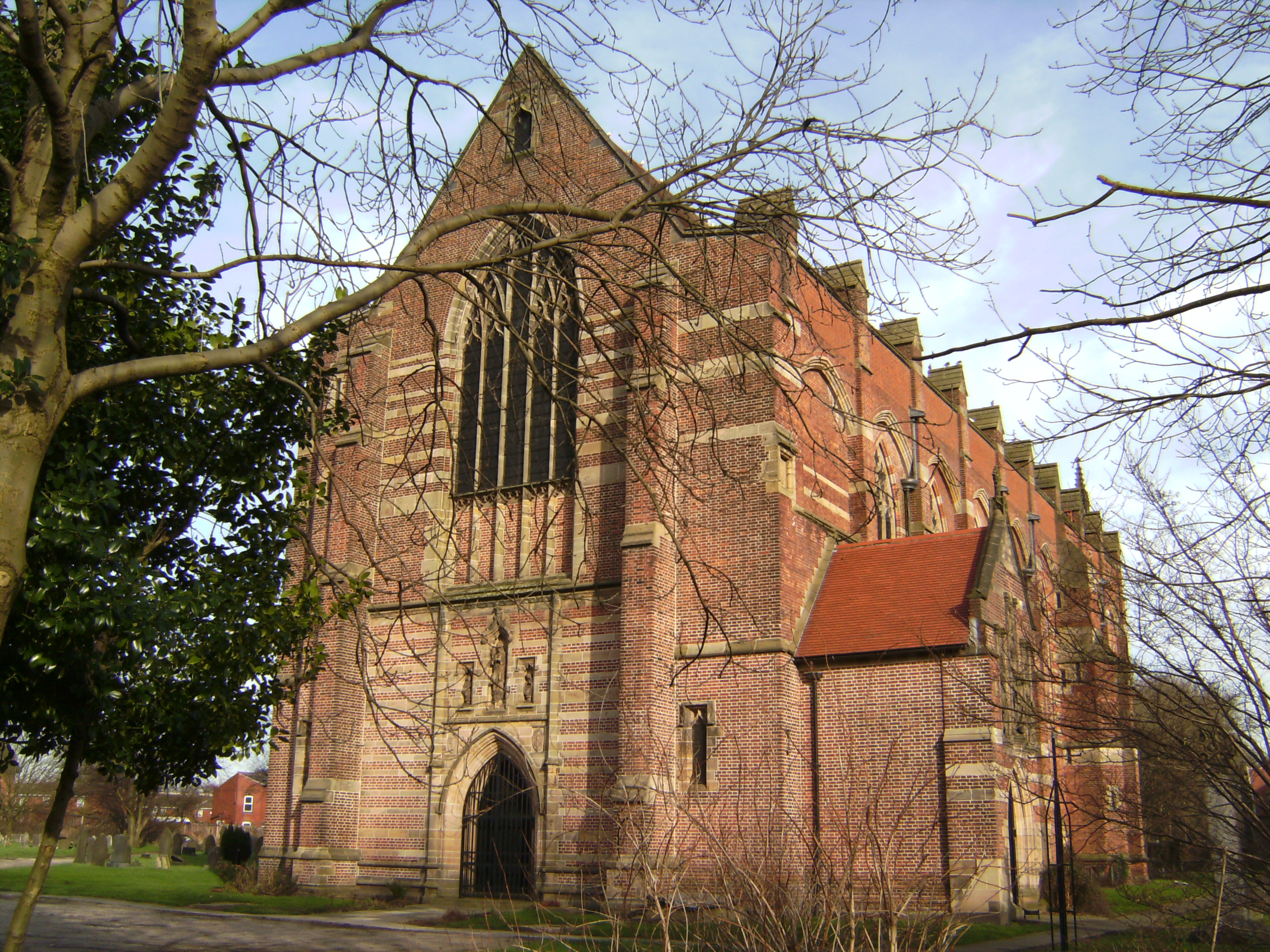
St. Augustine's Church, Pendlebury

The architectural highlight of the town is the Grade I listed Gothic style High Anglican St Augustine's Church, designed by the 19th century architect George Frederick Bodley between 1871 and 1874. It is one of six Grade I listed buildings in the City of Salford. The church became known as the miners' cathedral because of its lofty appearance and because many local men were colliers. The churchyard contains a memorial to 178 men and boys who died in a disaster at Clifton Hall Colliery on 18 June 1885. 64 victims are buried at St Augustine's. In May 2006, the church became the focal point of a campaign by English Heritage to save 19 places of worship in Greater Manchester from falling into dilapidation.

The Royal Manchester Children's Hospital built in 1873 closed in 2009 and its functions moved to a site alongside Manchester Royal Infirmary, in Manchester.

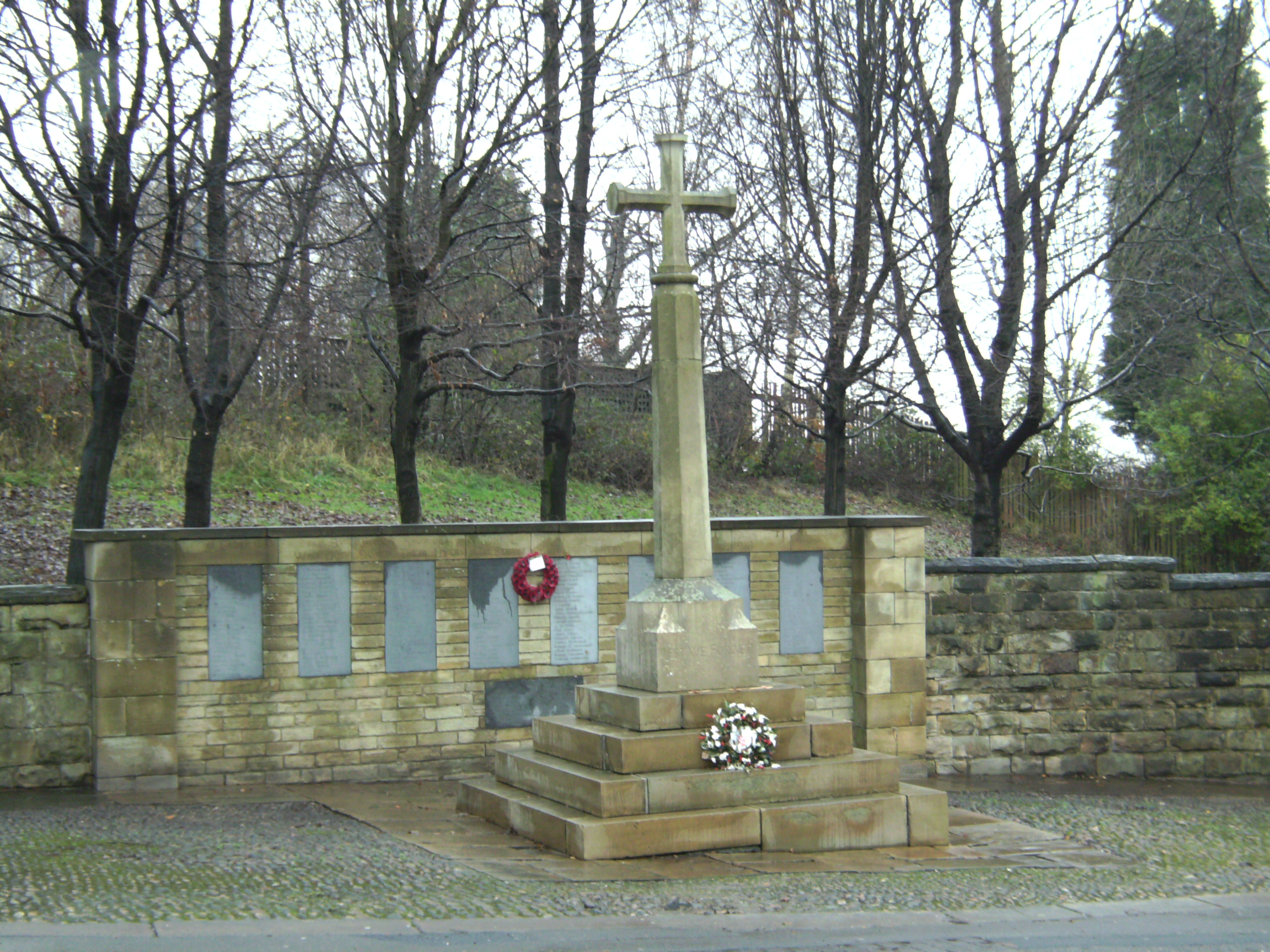
Pendlebury War Memorial

At the junction of Bolton Road and Agecroft Road stands a stone cross with the inscription "Lest We Forget". Behind it is a stone wall on which is written:

"This cross was erected by Andrew Knowles and Sons to the memory of the brave men from their collieries who laid down their lives for their country A.D. 1914–1918"

Below the inscription are eight slate plaques inscribed with the names of 24 men who worked for Andrew Knowles and Sons.

== Sport ==
The former home of Swinton RLFC, Station Road, which held numerous internationals and major rugby league matches before its closure in 1992, was located in Pendlebury. Swinton announced its intention to return to a site adjacent to Agecroft Road, Pendlebury, currently known as Agecroft Farm in August 2006. Langworthy ARLFC has been based in Pendlebury, at Rabbit Hills playing fields on Bolton Road, for over 20 years, whilst local rivals Folly Lane ARLFC operate on the Blue Ribbon field off Pendlebury Road.

St. John the Evangelist churchyard is the burial place of Geoff Bent, one of the Busby Babes from Manchester United F.C., who perished in the Munich air disaster on 6 February 1958. St John's is also the burial place of Jim Valentine, captain of Swinton Rugby Club, an England rugby union international in the late Victorian era. His 48 tries for The Lions in the 1888–89 season still stands as a club record.

Pendlebury Coyotes won the amateur World Championship in inline hockey at under-21 level in 2006 and were runners-up in the World Championship at senior level.

== Schools ==
=== Primary ===
- Mossfield Primary School, Newtown
- St Augustine's CE Primary School
- St John's CE Primary School

=== Secondary ===
- Co-op Academy Swinton

== Churches ==
- St. Augustine's C of E, Bolton Road, Pendlebury
- St Mark's RC, Station Road, Pendlebury
- Christ Church – Assemblies of God (formerly C of E), Bolton Road, Pendlebury
- Kings Church Salford, Bolton Road, Pendlebury
- St John the Evangelist C of E, Bolton Road, Pendlebury
- Salvation Army, Station Road, Pendlebury

== Notable people ==
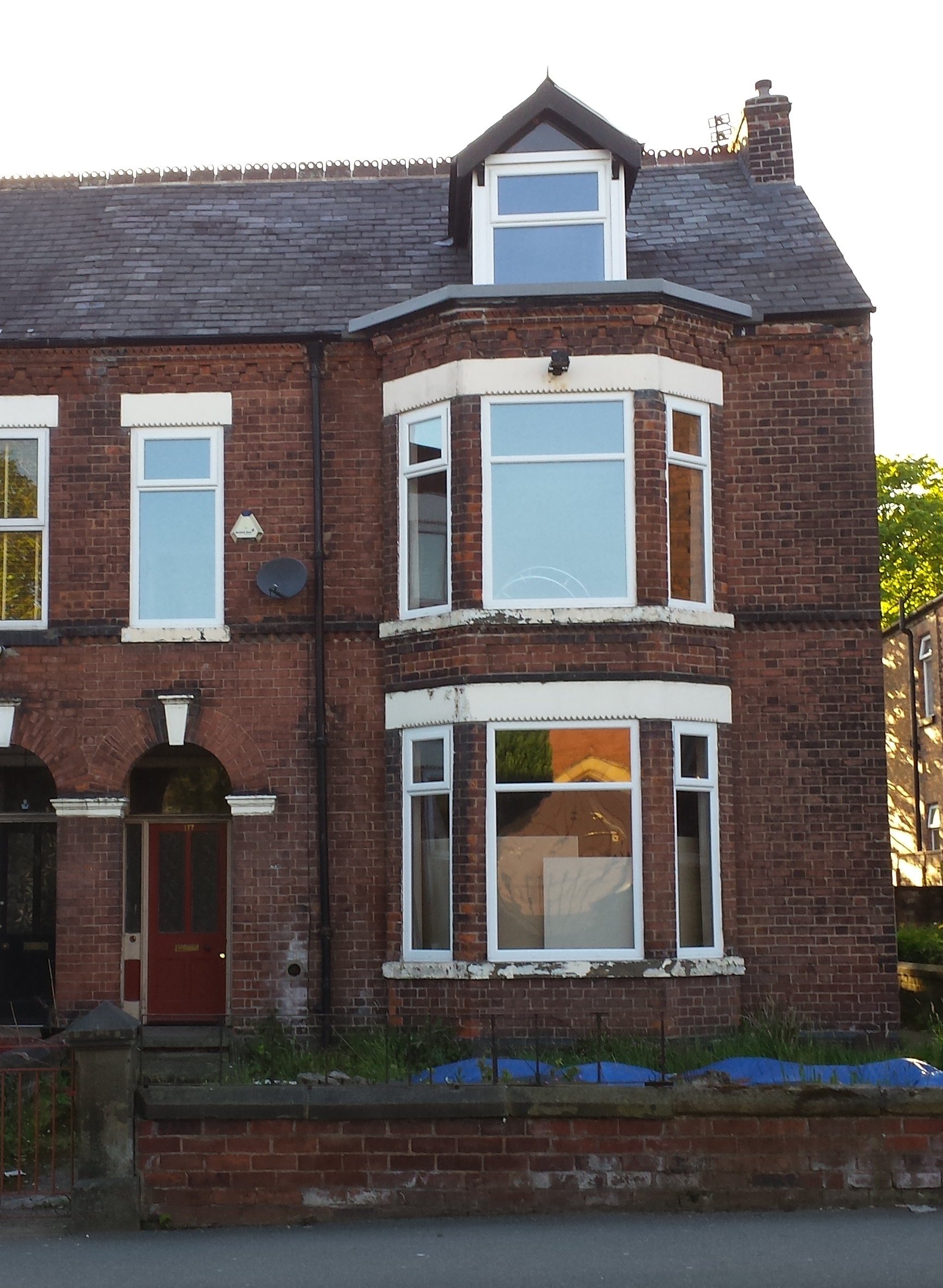
The former home of artist L. S. Lowry at 117 Station Road, Pendlebury

Pendlebury was home to the painter L. S. Lowry (1887–1976), who lived at 117 Station Road from 1909 to 1948, after his parents moved from Victoria Park in Manchester when he was 22. Here Lowry produced many of his famous works, drawing inspiration from the industrial scenes about him. It has been reported that, having missed a train from Pendlebury railway station, Lowry encountered the changing of shifts at Acme Mill and marvelled at the spectacle – this being the moment he decided that industrial scenes were fitting for further work. Aspects of the locality appear in many of Lowry's paintings; elements of the Acme Mill can be seen in Coming from the Mill (1930); his picture Pendlebury Scene shows an aspect of the Acme Mill from George Street, both now demolished; and in 1953, Lowry painted The Railway Platform, a scene of railway passengers standing on the platform at Pendlebury railway station.

and

- James Aspinall Turner (1797–1867), entomologist and Whig politician, lived in Pendlebury Hall.
- Lilias Armstrong (1882–1937), a phonetician working at University College, London
- Tom Price (1902–1973), trade unionist and politician, MP for Westhoughton 1951 to 1973
- Tony Warren (1936–2016), scriptwriter, raised at Wilton Avenue. He created the award-winning soap opera Coronation Street.
- Sir Ben Kingsley (born 1943), actor, grew up in Pendlebury and was educated at the Manchester Grammar School. Kingsley lived adjacent to Lowry's former home on Station Road.

=== Sport ===
- Walter Bumby (1860–1936), rugby union footballer who played 333 games for Swinton Lions
- Fred Butters (1904–1988), rugby league footballer who played 351 games for Swinton Lions
- Jack Kenny (1907–1994), rugby league footballer who played 117 games for Leigh Leopards
- Frank Griffin (1928–2007), footballer who played 240 games for West Bromwich Albion
- Ryan Giggs (born 1973), footballer with Manchester United; grew up in Beverley Road, after a family move from South Wales when his father Danny Wilson switched rugby codes. In 2009 Giggs was granted the freedom of Salford.

== See also ==
- Listed buildings in Swinton and Pendlebury
