= Pendleton railway station =

Former railway station in England

Pendleton
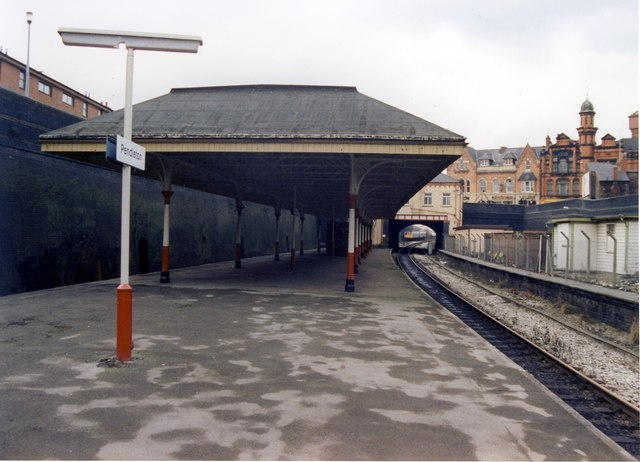
- Pendleton railway station in 1989

General information
- Location: Pendleton, Salford; England
- Coordinates: 53.4922°N 2.2841°W
- Grid reference: SJ813995
- Platforms: 2

Other information
- Status: Disused

History
- Original company: Lancashire and Yorkshire Railway
- Pre-grouping: Lancashire and Yorkshire Railway
- Post-grouping: London, Midland and Scottish Railway

Key dates
- 1 June 1889: Opened as Pendleton Broad Street
- ?: Renamed Pendleton
- 1994: Temporarily Closed
- 1998: Formally closed
Location

Pendleton (Broad Street) railway station was a railway station serving Pendleton, a district of Salford. It was on Broughton Road (A576) just behind St. Thomas' Church. It was about 100 yards further up Broughton Road from Pendleton Bridge railway station and nearer Pendleton Church and Broad Street (A6). This station was known as Pendleton Broad Street due to its closeness to the A6 Broad Street some 100 yards away. It was on the Manchester Victoria to Wigan Wallgate line with a spur to the Manchester Victoria to Bolton line so trains to Bolton used it after the closure of Pendleton Bridge in 1966, and "Broad Street" was then dropped from its name.

== History ==
The line from Windsor Bridge Junction (Salford) and Crow Nest Junction (Hindley), which shortened the route between Manchester and Liverpool, was authorised in 1883, and in 1885 a connection was authorised from the new line at Brindle Heath to the Bolton line at Agecroft.

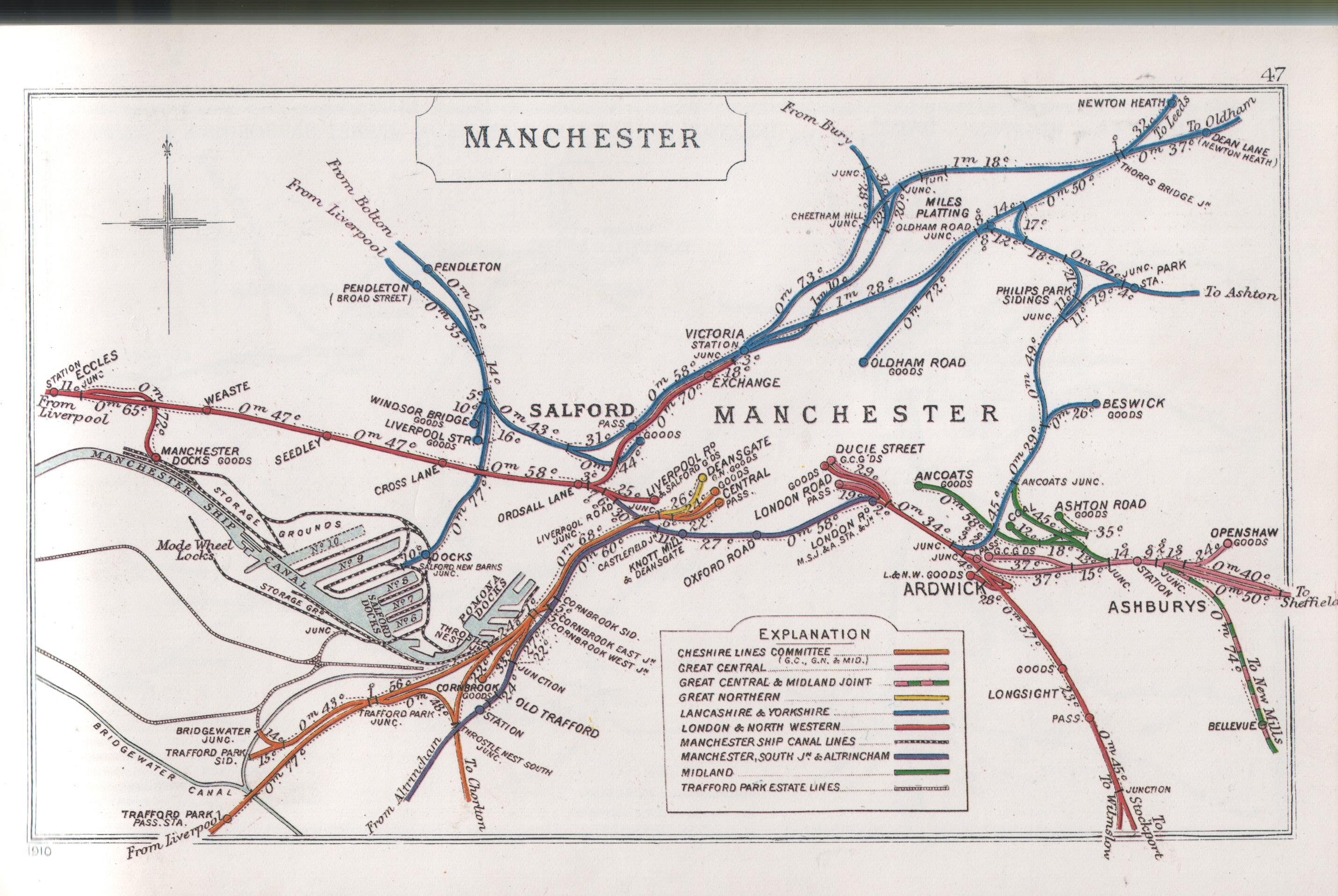
A 1910 Railway Clearing House Junction Diagram showing railways in the vicinity of Pendleton (upper left; shown here as PENDLETON (BROAD STREET))

The new lines opened in stages to goods traffic during 1887–88, and to passengers on 1 June 1889; on that day the station initially named Pendleton Broad Street was also opened. It had four platforms, as it served both the Bolton line (via the Brindle Heath Junction–Agecroft Junction connection) and the new Wigan line.

Until the 1980s Pendleton was one of the more important stations on the Bolton-Manchester line, one of only two stations with a Sunday service. The nearby Salford Crescent railway station, which opened in 1987, however, took much of the passenger traffic away from Pendleton station, sending it into terminal decline. In 1988 services to Bolton were withdrawn (with the closure of the Brindle Heath to Agecroft Junction chord) leaving Pendleton served by Atherton line trains only.

An arson attack in July 1994 led to the station being closed "temporarily" by GMPTE, though by this time it was only being served by four trains each day. Final closure came in 1998 after it was deemed that repairing the damage caused by the vandalism would not represent good value for money: "The Franchising Director advertised the closure and, in assessing the impact of the closure the RUCC for North Western England concluded (on 6 May 1998) that no hardship would result from closure as no trains had called at Pendleton for four years." Closure came despite a campaign for it to be re-opened by Salford Council in 1996.

Close to the station was Agecroft locomotive shed and sidings. The platform-level buildings have all been demolished, but the remnants of both island platforms are still visible from passing trains.

Preceding station	Historical railways	Following station
Agecroft Bridge; Line and station closed	Lancashire and Yorkshire Railway	Salford Crescent; Line and station open
Irlams o' th' Height; Line open, station closed	Lancashire and Yorkshire Railway	Salford Crescent; Line and station open
