= St Augustine's Church, Pendlebury =

St Augustine's Church
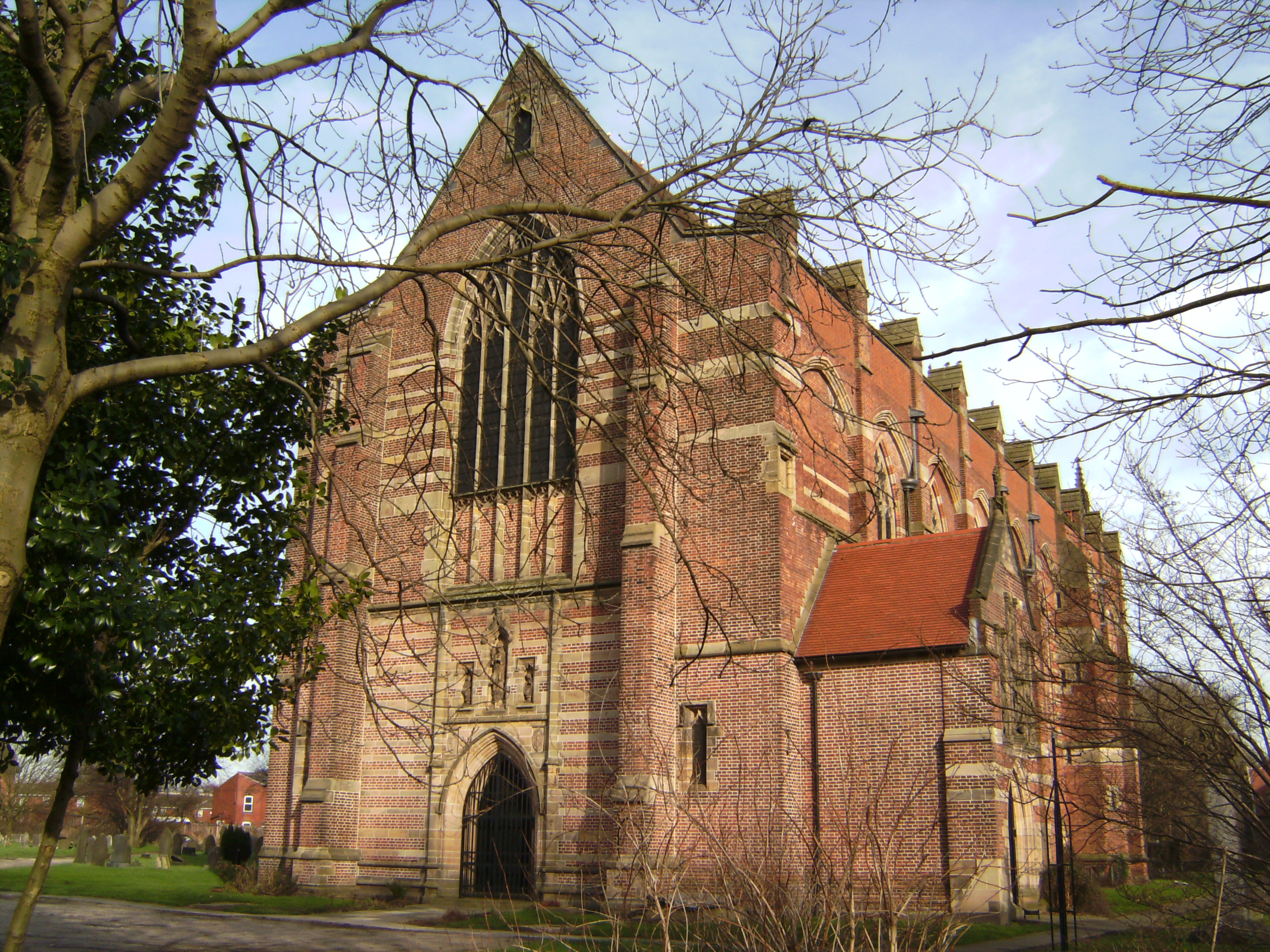
- St Augustine's Church
- St Augustine's Church
- 53.5107°N 2.3224°W
- OS grid reference: SD 78719 01606
- Location: Pendlebury, Greater Manchester
- Country: England
- Denomination: Anglican
- Churchmanship: Anglo-Catholic

History
- Dedication: St Augustine
- Consecrated: 26 May 1874

Architecture
- Functional status: Active
- Heritage designation: Grade I
- Architect: George Frederick Bodley
- Architectural type: Church
- Style: Gothic Revival
- Groundbreaking: 1871
- Completed: 1874

Specifications
- Length: 159 feet (48 m)
- Height: 80 feet (24 m)
- Materials: Red brick

Administration
- Province: York
- Diocese: Manchester
- Archdeaconry: Salford
- Deanery: Salford and Leigh
- Parish: Swinton and Pendlebury

Clergy
- Priest: Rev. Al Thompson

St. Augustine's Church is an active Anglican church in Pendlebury, Greater Manchester, England. Dedicated to St Augustine, it is part of the benefice of Swinton and Pendlebury along with St Peter's Church in Swinton and All Saints' Church in Wardley. The church is in the Eccles deanery, the archdeaconry of Salford and the diocese of Manchester. The church was granted Grade II* listed status in 1966 but has since been upgraded to Grade I.

Called the "Miners' Cathedral", due to its almost cathedralesque stature, in the heart of a one time coal-mining community, it was also sometimes locally called "Gussie's".

The church is situated on Bolton Road and has a connected primary school.

== History ==
Manchester banker, Edward Stanley Heywood of Heywood's Bank commissioned G. F. Bodley to design the church in March 1870. Its foundation stone was laid in the following September and it was consecrated in May 1874. Heywood paid for its construction, decoration and furnishings. The church was constructed to the design of Bodley and Thomas Garner between 1871 and 1874. The cost, £33,000 (£3,230,000 in 2025) was largely borne by Heywood.

The church is placed at the back of a large site off Bolton Road, which sets it apart from the usual preference by Bodley for his churches to sit on the street line. This was presumably to avoid the church being rendered visually insignificant by the neighbouring textile mills. One of the most notable was the Albion Mill at the north-west corner of the site.. Also 500 yards (460 m) to the north was the Whitesheaf Colliery (also known as Pendlebury Colliery) with 50 feet (15 m) high headgear and a 174 feet (53 m) chimney.

The church is built on a site close to extensive mine workings. It was built on a concrete raft which has prevented any noticeable problems with subsidence. Bodley designed a bell tower for the south-east side, higher than the main roof and connected to the church with a bridge at first floor level, but it was never built, presumably due to concerns over potential subsidence which could have given rise to differential settlement.

The church was consecrated by Rt. Revd. James Fraser, Bishop of Manchester on 26 May 1874.

== Architecture ==
=== Exterior ===
The church is built of red brick and has clay tile roof and Storeton stone dressings. It was inspired by the Gothic cathedrals in Albi and Toulouse in France. Its nave and chancel occupy ten bays under a continuous roof.

The church has a door at the west end, a porch on the south side and vestry on the north. The bays are separated by shallow weathered buttresses that terminate in triangular gablets above the coped parapet which has pierced quatrefoils above the chancel.

The nave and chancel are differentiated by their windows. The nave has three-light windows below blank arches while the chancel has four-light windows with reticulated tracery. The east window between angled buttresses topped by crocketted pinnacles has seven lights decorated with flowing reticulated tracery. The west window has five lights.

=== Interior ===
The nave looking east

High altar, church interior

The church has large internal buttresses that are pierced by passage aisles and which support high-level arches. The barrel roof is richly painted above chancel.

An elaborately carved rood screen separates the nave from the chancel and the sanctuary is raised. The reredos is decorated with painted figures which was executed by Burlison and Grylls.

The chancel floor is paved with stone and marble, and there is till work in the eastern part of it. The walls are painted with decorative work which gives an effect of colour to the interior. The east end has paintings of angels in carved stonework surrounding the east window.

The organ case, rood screen and sedilia were designed by Bodley.

The ornate font on a carved stone is raised from the ground by several steps, and above it is a carved wooden hood suspended from the walls.

High up on the internal buttresses in the nave are eight carved and gilded frames containing paintings by Frederick Richard Leach depicting saints. The four on the north wall are saints Paul, Peter, Gregory and Augustine while those on the south wall are the Venerable Bede and saints Ambrose, Jerome and Augustine of Hippo.

== Stained glass ==
The west window

The stained glass windows were designed by Burlison and Grylls on the basis of paintings of early Italians and north European artists. In a letter to the patron in 1878, Bodley explained:

We kept them broad in colour, each window having a leading colour. As all get done, the effect of this will be good I think. It is about the first time it has been tried in modern times - most new windows having so many colours in them. I think the less variety of colour is more artistic.

The east window of seven lights has the subject of the crucifixion in the centre, with St Mary and St John, and is surrounded by other figures of saints, St Augustine of Canterbury who gives his title to the church is in the centre of the lower tier of figures.

The west window consists of the “Jesse” subject, kings and prophets of the Old Testament, the Virgin and Jesus in the upper part.

A small window at the end of the south aisle has a figure of St Augustine and a picture of the entry into Canterbury.

== Organ ==
The organ

The church contains a 2 manual and pedal pipe organ which is now unplayable and an electronic organ is currently in use. The organ was originally constructed by Brindley & Foster of Sheffield. The organ case mounted on the wall of the north side of the church adjacent to the chancel screen was designed by Bodley.

== Clergy ==
- Doctor Alfred Dewes 1874-1911 (b. Coventry 1825; d. Pendlebury 1911), was vicar from the consecration of the church in 1874 until his death in 1911. He worked unceasingly throughout the smallpox and cholera outbreaks, helping the poor and afflicted. Both vicar and church were the focal point for the mourning following the Clifton Hall Colliery explosion on 18 June 1885, in which 178 men and boys were killed.
- John Bernhard Steinien Barratt 1911-1921 (formerly rector of St Chrysostom’s Church, Manchester, afterwards rector of St Botolph’s Church, Brampton)
- T.H. Minett 1921-1923
- Leigh L. Orton 1923-1927
- Edwin Thomas Kerby 1928-1960
- Ralph Olsen 1961-1963
- R.S. Percival 1963-1968
- Frank E. Brown from 1968
- Susan Timmins until 2015 (afterwards vicar of All Saints’ Church, Appley Bridge and Christ Church, Parbold)
- Al Thompson

== Churchyard ==
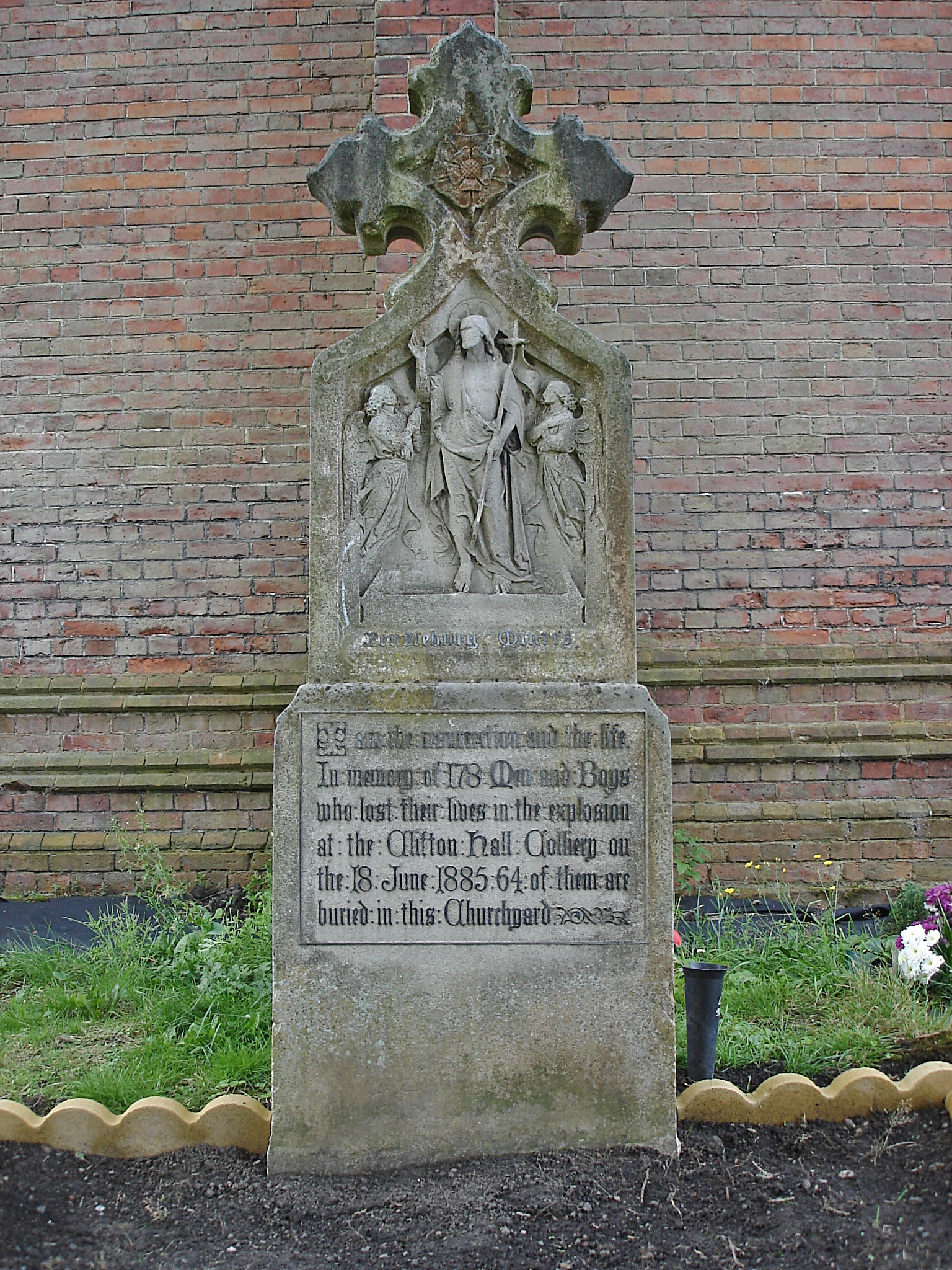
Clifton Hall Colliery disaster memorial.

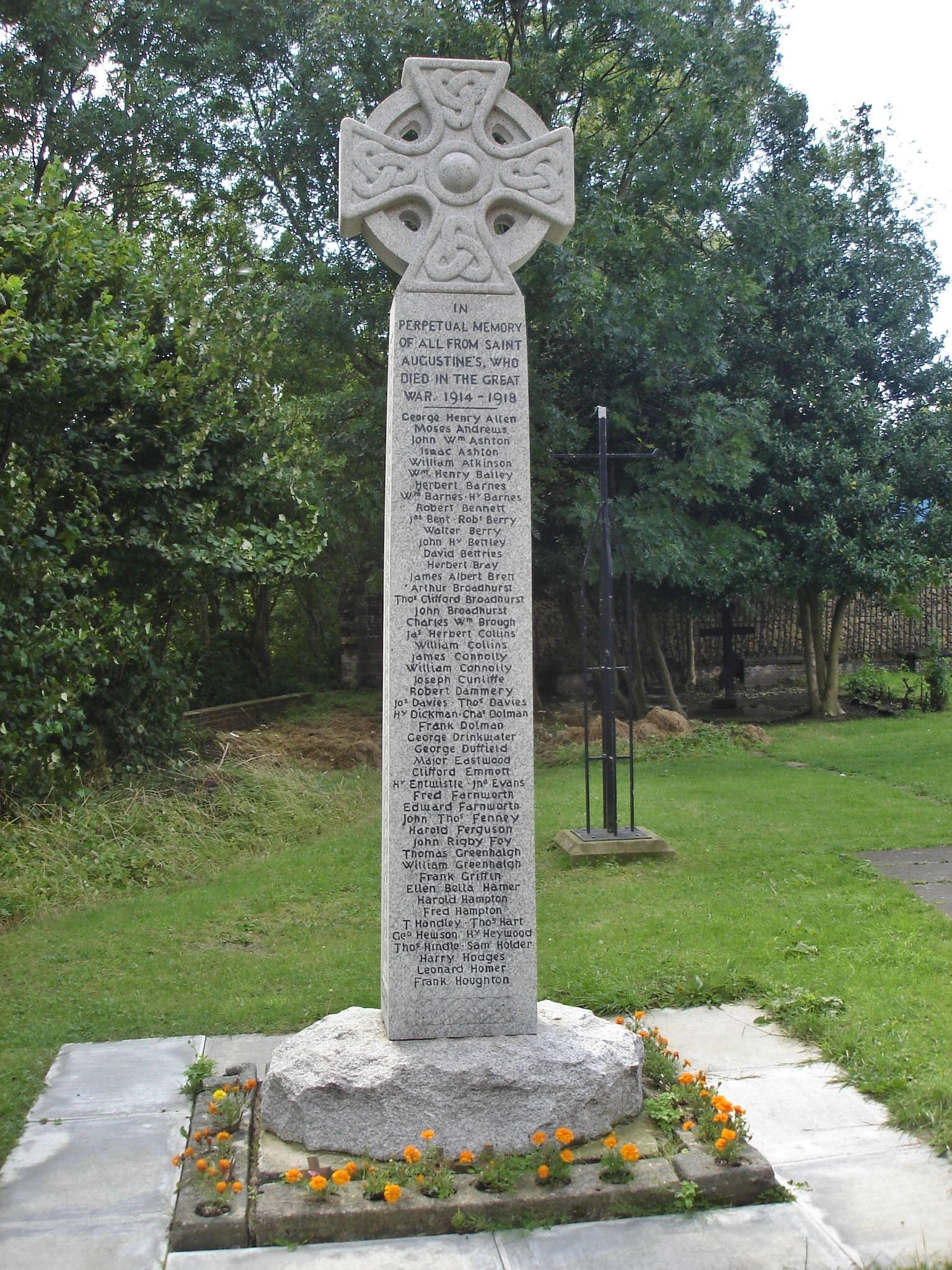
War memorial on the south side of the churchyard

Below the east window is a memorial to 64 victims of the Clifton Hall Colliery disaster who were buried in the churchyard. The churchyard also contains war graves of twelve service personnel of the Great War and four of the Second World War.

== Reception ==
Nikolaus Pevsner writing in the Buildings of England described the church as one of the greatest and most moving of all Victorian churches, with an interior of "breathtaking majesty and purity".

The church was the subject of drawings and paintings by artist L.S. Lowry who lived at 117 Station Road, Pendlebury, between 1909 and 1948.

== Current condition ==
In recent years, several church restoration projects have been completed, including re-pointing southeast side and the addition of toilets and a kitchen. The church is in need of at least £1 million for refurbishments to the interior roof and to repair the pointing on the exterior of the church, and is a priority project for English Heritage, who quote it as being "exceptionally important".

== See also ==
- Grade I listed churches in Greater Manchester
- Listed buildings in Swinton and Pendlebury
