= Greater Manchester bus route 52 =

Bus route in Manchester, England

52
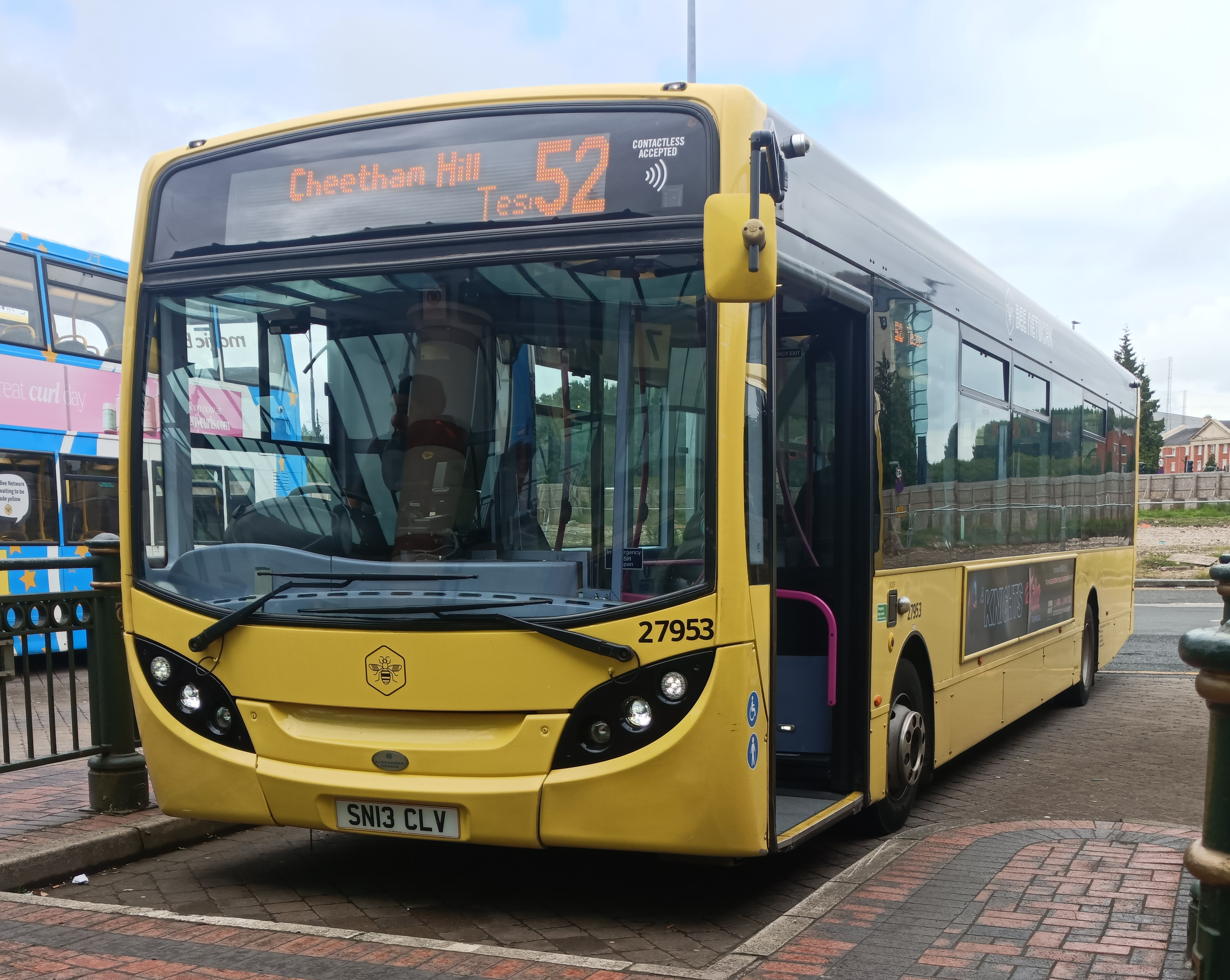
- Stagecoach Manchester Bee Network branded Enviro 300 at The Trafford Centre in June 2025

Overview
- Operator: Stagecoach Manchester
- Garage: Queens Road
- Vehicle: Alexander Dennis Enviro300; Volvo B8RLE MCV Evora
- Predecessors: First Manchester; Go North West

Route
- Start: Trafford Centre
- Via: Eccles Interchange; Seedley; Pendleton; Charlestown; Salford Shopping Centre; Cheetham Hill; Crumpsall; Moston; Newton Heath
- End: Failsworth Tesco

Service
- Level: Daily
- Frequency: 10-60 mins

Greater Manchester bus route 52 is a Bee Network contracted bus route in Greater Manchester, England. Running between Trafford Centre and Failsworth, it is operated by Stagecoach Manchester.

== History ==
Greater Manchester's bus route 52 was launched on 25 October 1986 by GM Buses. Before 31 May 1988, route 52 operated as a circular service connecting areas such as Old Trafford, Pendleton, Cheetham Hill, Miles Platting, Ashburys, Belle Vue, Longsight, Hulme, Stretford Road, and Chorlton. This extensive loop around Manchester was eventually withdrawn after two years, allowing the altering and splitting of both routes 52 and 53, offering a more direct service. The route passed to GM Buses North with the splitting of GM Buses into two companies in 1992, eventually rebranded as First Manchester following its purchase by the FirstGroup.

In 2019, the route was taken over by Go North West from First Manchester. Under Go North West, the route, alongside route 53, became known as the 'Manchester Orbits', receiving a fleet of twelve Alexander Dennis Enviro200s in a bright orange route-branded livery. This branding initiative aimed to highlight the routes' role in connecting various suburbs without necessitating travel into the city centre.

On 24 March 2024, route 52 was acquired by Stagecoach Manchester through the transfer of Queens Road garage from Go North West to Stagecoach as part of Tranche 2 of the Bee Network. A fleet of new MCV Evora bodied Volvo B8RLEs were allocated by Stagecoach on this route to operate alongside Alexander Dennis Enviro300s acquired from First Manchester.

== Service pattern ==
The 52 has numerous service patterns which generally operate every 30-60 minutes. Which serving overlapping areas of patterns up to every 10 minutes.
