= Greater Manchester bus route 53 =

Bus route in Manchester, England

53
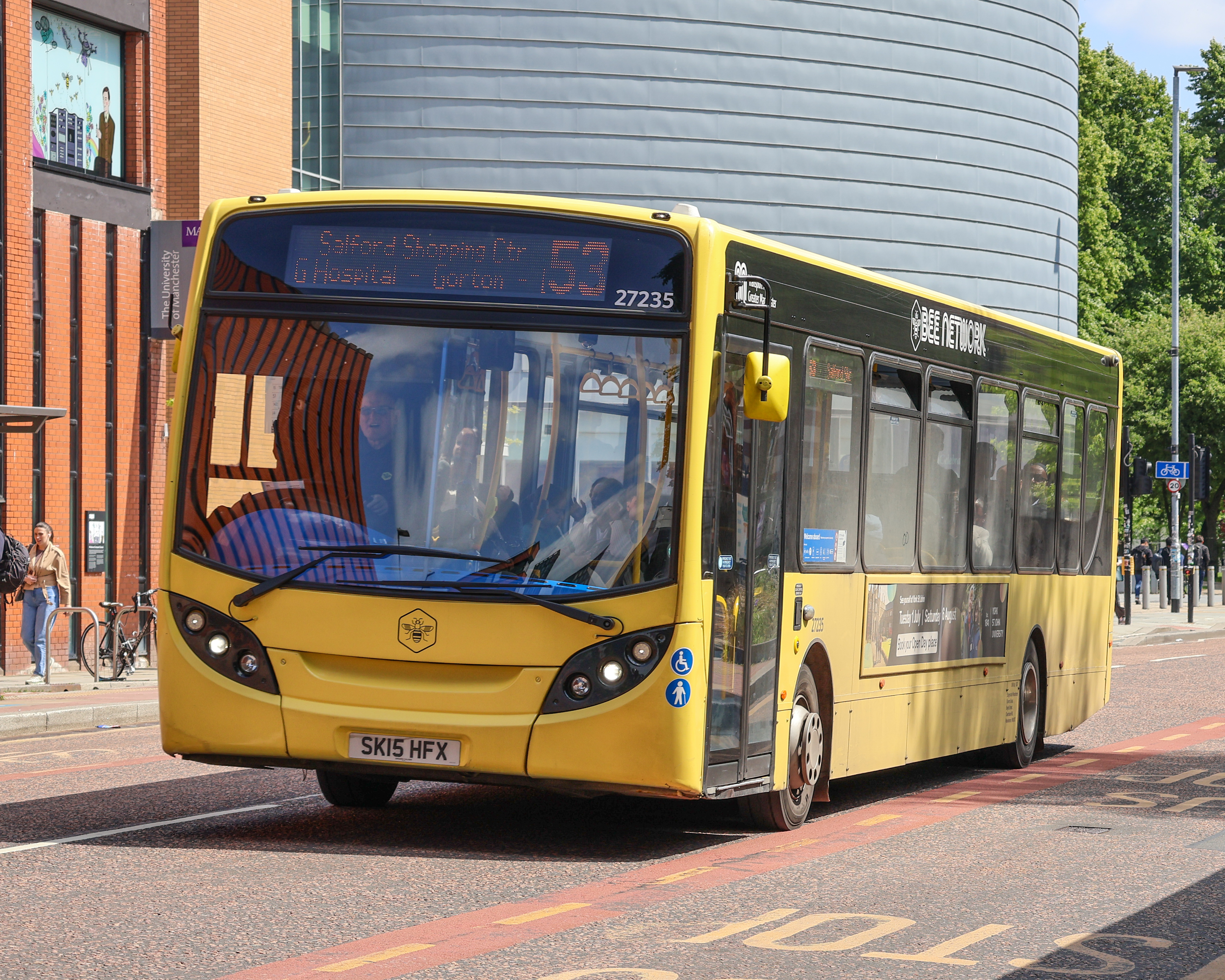
- Stagecoach Manchester Bee Network branded Alexander Dennis Enviro300 at the University of Manchester in June 2025

Overview
- Operator: Stagecoach Manchester
- Garage: Queens Road
- Vehicle: Alexander Dennis Enviro300; Volvo B8RLE MCV Evora
- Predecessors: First Manchester; Go North West

Route
- Start: Salford Shopping Centre
- Via: MediaCityUK; Trafford Bar; Old Trafford; Hulme; Chorlton upon Medlock; Rusholme; Longsight; Belle Vue; Gorton; Velopark; Harpurhey; Higher Crumpsall
- End: Cheetham Hill Tesco

Service
- Frequency: 30-60 mins
- Operates: Daily

Greater Manchester bus route 53 is a bus route runs between Salford Shopping Centre and Cheetham Hill. It is operated by Stagecoach Manchester on contract from Transport for Greater Manchester.

== History ==
The 53 was introduced by Manchester Corporation Tramways in the 1920s. Originally, it was a tram route serving Gorton, Belle Vue Zoo along Hyde Road. It was converted to a bus service as buses became more practical and affordable in the 1930s and 1940s. At the 1940s-1950s, the 53 became well established as a key orbital service around Manchester. It got a route similar to the tram route that was taken over, connecting suburbs like Higher Openshaw, Trafford Park industrial estate, and Old Trafford that were vital to the city's economy, which helped residents avoid having to travel into the city centre when moving between areas. In the 1970s, Manchester's public transport system underwent changes with the creation of the SELNEC Passenger Transport Executive (South East Lancashire North East Cheshire), which took over the bus services in the region, including route 53. In 1974, The Greater Manchester County Council formed Greater Manchester Transport (GMPTE) to unify the region’s bus services, which included route 53. The route remained popular as it connected vital suburban areas such as Salford, Cheetham Hill, and Old Trafford.

In 1986, the deregulation of bus services in the UK had a significant impact on Greater Manchester's bus network, including route 53. Bus companies were now able to operate more freely, which led to competition on some routes. However, route 53 survived deregulation largely intact due to its established demand and importance. The route were taken over by GM Buses North (now First Manchester) that time.

In 2019, the route was taken over by Go North West from First Manchester. Under Go North West, the route, alongside route 52, became known as the 'Manchester Orbits', receiving a fleet of twelve Alexander Dennis Enviro200s in a bright orange route-branded livery.

On 24 March 2024, route 53 was acquired by Stagecoach Manchester through the transfer of Queens Road garage from Go North West to Stagecoach as part of Tranche 2 of the Bee Network. Under Stagecoach, the route was allocated a fleet of Alexander Dennis Enviro300s acquired from First Manchester.

== Route ==
The 53 serves the following primary locations:

- Salford Shopping Centre
- MediaCityUK
- Trafford Bar
- Old Trafford
- Hulme
- Chorlton upon Medlock
- Rusholme
- Longsight
- Belle Vue
- Gorton
- Velopark
- Harpurhey
- Higher Crumpsall
- Cheetham Hill
