= Andrew Knowles and Sons =

Andrew Knowles and Sons was a coal mining company that operated on the Manchester Coalfield in and around Clifton near Pendlebury, in the historic county of Lancashire, England.

Robert Knowles who died 1780, started pits in Eagley Bank and Sharples, north of Bolton. The pits were inherited by his descendants, Andrew (1735–1810), Robert (1756–1819) and Andrew (1783–1847), his great grandson. The family had an interest in this area until 1870.

Andrew Knowles was born in 1783 into a family whose mining interests began in Elizabethan times and whose descendants dominated the industry at the end of the Victorian era. Before 1810 Knowles operated in Bolton, Darcy Lever and Great Lever and subsequently bought leases in the Irwell Valley near Clifton. In the late 1830s Knowles took his four sons into partnership. Andrew Knowles died in 1847 and a son, John, died in 1852 leaving Robert, Thomas and James Knowles to continue the business. Little Bolton Colliery on Slater Lane near the River Tonge in Bolton was owned by the company between 1853 and 1863. The third generation joined the firm after a disagreement in 1872 and Andrew Knowles and Sons Limited was formed in 1883. The firm grew to be the largest on the Manchester Coalfield by the end of the 19th century when it had almost 4,000 employees.

The company sank the first Agecroft Colliery which operated until 1928. The output of Knowles' collieries was initially for local use and was moved by road transport. Some collieries were close to the Manchester, Bolton and Bury Canal on which the company operated a fleet of boats and by 1850 some pits had access to the Lancashire and Yorkshire Railway's Manchester to Bolton line. Clifton Moss Colliery employed up to 300 men before 1891 when it closed.

In 1896 the company owned Clifton Hall Colliery in Lumns Lane, Clifton, Foggs Colliery in Darcy Lever, Wheatsheaf Colliery in Pendlebury and Pendleton Colliery in Pendleton, Salford. By then Rivin Colliery in Little Lever and Allens Green and Green Lane in Radcliffe had been abandoned. In 1929 the company became part of Manchester Collieries.

In 1866 all workers who had joined the forerunner of the Miners' Federation of Great Britain were locked out of the Knowles pits and the company defeated attempts to unionise the workforce. The company's intransigence towards unions continued up to 1891 when a strike left miners little better off but the firm was forced to negotiate with a union it had up to then refused to recognise.

== See also ==
- List of mining disasters in Lancashire
