= Clifton Hall Colliery =

Coal mine in North-East England

Clifton Hall colliery
- Clifton Hall Colliery shown within Greater Manchester
- Location: Clifton, Lancashire, England; 53.516393°N 2.313177°W
- Products: Coal
- Type: Deep mine
- Greatest depth: 595 yards (544 m) (shaft bottom)
- Opened: Prior to 1820
- Closed: 1929
- Company: Andrew Knowles and Sons
1885 disaster
- Date: June 18, 1885
- Time: 09:20
- Cause: Ignition of firedamp by a candle
- Deaths: 177
- Inquiries: Morely, 1885
- Inquest: 30 June 1885 – 9 July 1885
- Coroner: Mr Frederick Price
- Awards: Albert Medal for Thomas Worrall, George Hindley and George Higson

Clifton Hall Colliery was one of two coal mines in Clifton (the other was Wet Earth Colliery), and was notorious for an explosion in 1885 which killed around 178 men and boys.

The colliery, owned by Andrew Knowles and Sons, was located in the Irwell Valley, just off Lumns Lane and had extensive railway sidings on the London and North Western Railway's Clifton Branch. It was connected to the Manchester, Bolton and Bury Canal by a ¼-mile long tramway.

== History ==
It is thought that the colliery was operating by 1820 and its tramway is shown on a parliamentary plan from 1830 and on an 1845 map.

According to some reports in 1869 the miners complained about the safety conditions underground, but Andrew Knowles and Sons refused to concede and a strike began. After some weeks miners were brought in from the Black Country to break the strike. The incoming miners (known as "Bilston scabs") were given the houses formerly occupied by the striking miners. However other researchers have cast doubt in the details. Cutler (2018) cites newspaper reports from 1866 indicating discontent with the management due to the banning of a trades union. The Wigan Observer (quoted by Cutler) reported the ejection of locked out miners in 1866 and their replacement by "200 men from Cornwall and 300 from Staffordshire" brought by the company along with "about twice as many" who came "at their own expense". By the time of the 1885 disaster (below), all the men killed had a local address and were identified by people who also had a local address (where one was given). For many years afterwards the area became known as Little Bilston.

Ventilation by furnace was replaced in 1886. Production of coal ended 9 November 1929, but a shaft was retained for ventilation at Wheatsheaf Colliery in Pendlebury.

== Description ==
The colliery had two shafts only 10 yards (9.1 m) apart. The downcast (Note: Downcast — a shaft where air is drawn down into a colliery.) shaft was used for access and coal extraction. The upcast (Note: Upcast — a shaft where air is drawn or pushed upwards out of the colliery.) shaft was provided with ropes and pulleys for use if the downcast was blocked. The shafts passed through four shallower "mines" (Note: In this part of Lancashire a coal seam is referred to as a mine and the coal mine is a colliery or pit.) that were not worked in 1885 before reaching the Dow, Five-Quarters and Trencherbone mines. The shafts terminated at the Cannel mine which at the time of the explosion was not being worked. The Trencherbone seam is about 6 feet (1.8 m) high. Above it is around 6 feet of "white metal" a rock forming a fair roof, and above that some low grade coal which was not worked. Above this poor coal is "good solid rock" 20 yards (18 m) thick known as the Trencherbone rock. All the strata in the colliery sloped down from the north to the south at about 1 in 3 1/2. A horizontal tunnel ran from where the downcast shaft met the Trencherbone mine southward until it intersected the Five-Quarters and finally Dow mines.

The mine was worked by driving headings east and west to the limit of the colliery and then the coal was extracted on a retreating wall basis. The coal north of the shafts had already been worked out (apart from a pillar to support the shafts and workings). South of the shafts the coal had largely been worked out back to the supporting pillar for about 2/3 of the distance, that to the south was being actively worked at the time of the explosion. Headings were labelled numbers 1 and 2 east and west in the worked section, number 3 east and west and number 4 west in the southern extremity. The large areas to the east and the west of the central roads formed a large area known as the goaf. (Note: Also called the gob.) This space (up to 1,200 yards (1,100 m) across) was in part supported by pack walls and partially filled with waste. It was allowed to gradually subside, crushing the pack walls down. To prevent subsidence beneath Agecroft Hall, a pillar of coal about 200 yards (180 m) square had been left some 600 yards (550 m) beyond the limit of the 1885 workings. In the goaf the roof broke away from the Trencherbone rock resulting in voids forming above the low grade coal.

The tunnel to the five-quarters mine and on to the Agecroft Colliery was not in regular use. Although driven with 5 feet (1.5 m) height the pressure from above had closed it to as little as 3 feet (0.91 m) in places. Furthermore, water had collected in it for a distance of 200 yards (180 m) and reduced the air space to as little as 2 feet 6 inches (0.76 m).

Ventilation was provided by a furnace near the upcast shaft on the Trencherbone seam. All air from the Trencherbone mine passed over this furnace, reliance being placed on mixing for reducing the possibility of an explosion. In the official report Morley expressed doubts over this practice and in his "General Remarks" at the end of the report explicitly recommended its replacement by a dumb-drift furnace (Note: Placing the furnace in a separate tunnel supplied with fresh air from the downcast shaft. The hot exhaust gasses pass into the upcast and draw air around the mine by induced draught due to the stack effect.) or by fan-driven ventilation.

Fresh air from the downcast shaft travelled along the main passages and was drawn off by several "splits". One such ran along number 2 east, across number 2 east faces, then across number 1 faces before rejoining the main return air passage leading to the furnace.

=== Lights ===
Trencherbone was worked with candles. Prior to the day shift the firemen (Note: Men charged with testing for gas and if necessary exploding it in a controlled manner.) tested and marked up those areas free of gas. The men were then allowed to proceed to their various workplaces, but only using safety lamps. The firemen made another round and if all was well would light the men's candles after which naked lights were permitted. Once candles had been lit men were allowed to smoke. Officially no pipe or tobacco were meant to be present when naked lights were prohibited (rule 33), but in practice the men had them in their pockets, along with matches, prior to the second visit.

Safety lamps were provided by the company, but had to be paid for by the men. The men also had to pay for candles and lamp oil. Three types of lamp were in use: "Davy", "Clanny" and "Bainbridge". The certified manager (Jonathan Hall) only had experience of the Davy and Clanny but admitted that he was aware of safer and brighter lamps. The inquiry examined an expert witness (Mr John Higson, mining engineer, member of the Institute of Civil Engineers and a fellow of the Geological Society) who stated that the Davy was "by no means a safe lamp". He explained that in an explosive atmosphere the Davy would ignite it in a current of 6 feet per second (1.8 m/s) whereas the Mueseler was safe up to 50 feet per second (15 m/s) and the Marsant 30 feet per second (9.1 m/s). Higson also categorically stated that "I do not think it is safe to work it [Trencherbone] with naked lights".

== Disaster ==
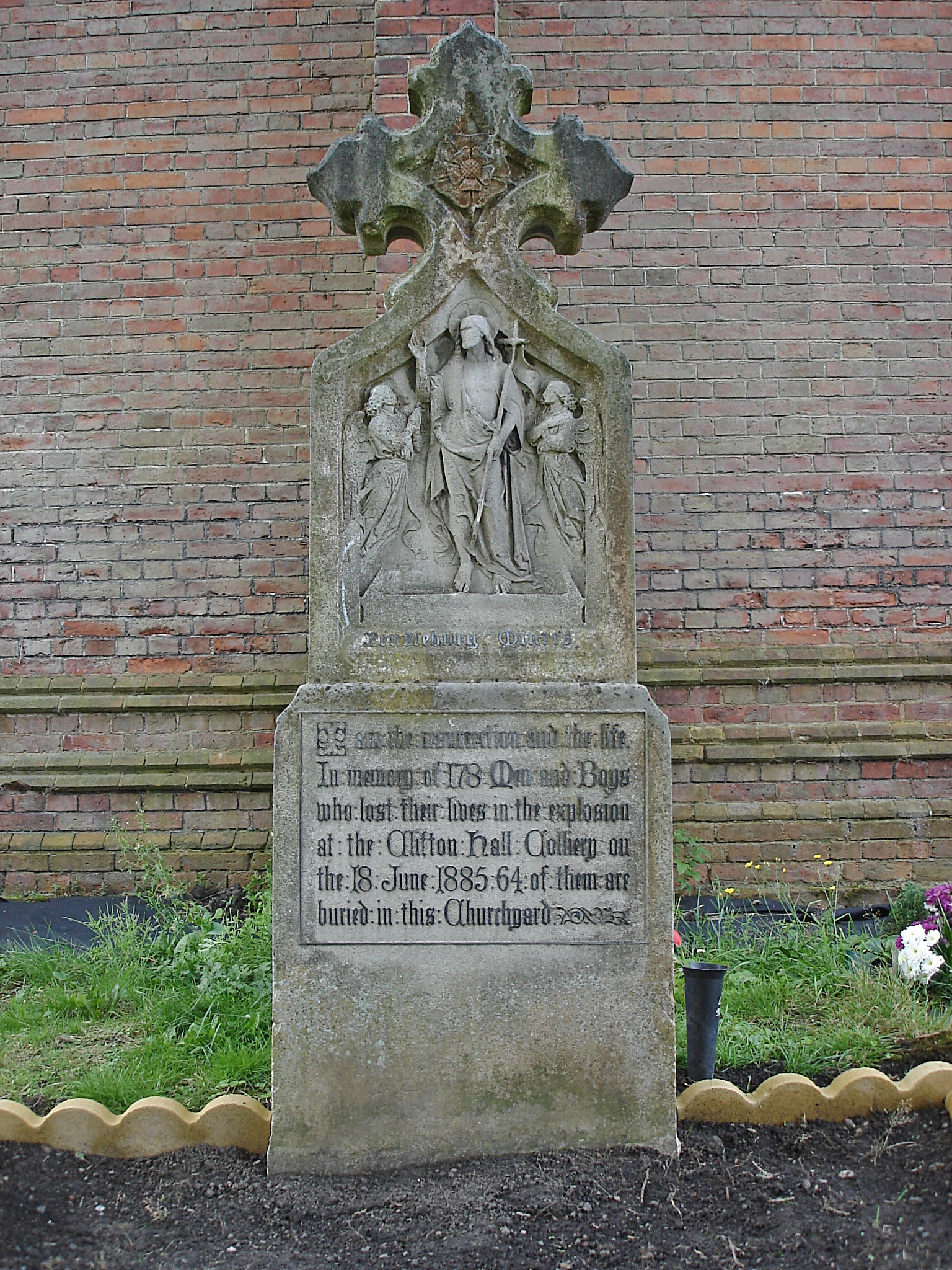
Clifton Hall disaster memorial, St Augustine's churchyard, beneath the East window

An explosion of the mine occurred at 09:20 on Thursday 18 June 1885. Higson's report (read into the record of the inquiry by the coroner) explains that the explosion must have originated at the extremity of number 2 East level. The explosion was compounded by gas being sucked out of the large goaf beyond the eastern workings. The mine was acknowledged to be dusty by Hall and the roadways had to be watered to control this. Coal dust was implicated in the blast: "the props being coated thickly in some instances with coked or burnt coal dust". The white metal above the goaf was weak and in the large unsupported span (600 yards (550 m) by 400 yards (370 m)) formed a bridge which fell away from the stronger Trencherbone rock. Within this space, firedamp was accumulating, undetected by the firemen's checks. At the time of the explosion a crack in the overburden opened up and the gas escaped to where men were working at the end of number 2 East. A naked candle ignited the gas. This initial blast would have been insufficient to explain the devastation. Higson's report supposes that the initial blast sucked more gas into the explosion and propagated it throughout the mine. Other contemporary and later research implicated coal dust as the culprit. Sir William Galloway (an Inspector of Mines and later Professor of Mining at the University College of Wales) was of the opinion that "the explosions are chiefly or very largely promoted by coal dust".

The explosion travelled throughout the Trencerbone mine with the exception of number 3 East, where ten men survived. All the other men in the mine were killed either by the explosion or by the afterdamp. The ten men in number 3 East were initially trapped by the after-damp, but after 13 hours were able to escape and reach the pit bottom. 122 of the men who were working in the Dow and Five-quarters mines were able to escape along the tunnel connecting Clifton's Dow mine to Agecroft Colliery's Trencherbone mine. (Note: Due to a geological fault Agecroft's Trencerbone seam was roughly level with Clifton's Dow seam, not 112 yards (102 m) below.) Nine men were found dead in the tunnel from their injuries or from the after-damp.

Morley reports that 177 men and boys died:

Location	Number	Cause
Salford Hospital	2	Shock to the system caused by burns
Home	7	Shock to the system caused by burns
Home	1	Inhaling carbonic acid gas (Note: "Carbonic acid gas" is today understood to be carbon dioxide. Afterdamp is largely carbon monoxide and that may be what is intended here.)
Tunnel	9	Suffocation by inhaling carbonic acid gas
Trencherbone mine	158	Effects of burns Effects of injuries Inhaling carbonic acid gas

However the memorial records 178 as having died, a statement repeated by modern commentators who record 159 as dying in the mine. The official report includes the minutes of proceedings and the title thereof mentions 178 men and boys as being killed, however the contents only list 177 names. On the plan of the mine showing where men were found, there are only 157 shown.

=== Rescue attempts ===
The ten men who were working in number 3 East were aware of the explosion when a "rush of wind" put out their candles and most of the lamps. One of the miners, Samuel Travis, gave evidence to the Coroner's inquest as to what happened thereafter. Travis, his brother and another man walked the 700 yards (640 m) to the "engine brow" (central roadway of the mine) and found there a "lot of foul air" and so returned to the far end. After repeated attempts, the men finally found breathable air by 16:30, some seven hours after the explosion. Six of the men started to walk out, four "required assistance" and were left behind, the walkers reached the pit bottom at 10:30. The other four men were later brought to the surface by a team led by John Crook, the manager of the connected Agecroft Colliery.

Crook was the certified manager of the adjacent, and connected, Agecroft colliery. At 09:20 he was in the colliery yard and heard the sound of the explosion. He saw black smoke rising "as if a large balloon was ascending". He sent a man down the pit to find the under-looker and instruct him to go to the communicating tunnel and render what assistance he could. Crook then set off "hurriedly" to Clifton Hall. Crook arrived at Clifton Hall at about 10:00 and discovered that the cages in the shaft were stuck fast. After a brief discussion with Simon Horrocks (the agent for Andrew Knowles and Sons) set off back by horse and cart to his own colliery. At Agecroft colliery Crook met the men ascending from the Dow and Five-Quarters mines. He asked for volunteers, and led a team of about 18 men down the Agecroft, along the "travelling way" (tunnel) into Clifton Hall Colliery. Crook felt the afterdamp and wedged the doors between the two collieries open to improve ventilation. The party moved forward but Crook sent all but one back to assist the Clifton Hall men escaping. Crook reached the pit bottom and met Thomas Worrall (underlooker in the Dow mine) and together put out the furnace to reduce the chance of a second explosion.

The winding mechanism had been fixed and the first party down included Horrocks, Hall and two other men from nearby collieries, Mr Barker of Pendleton and Mr Wall of Clifton Moss, along with some other miners. The senior staff (along with Cook) led exploration parties into the various headings, which were hampered by the afterdamp. The men eventually came up at 05:00 Friday morning. Further searches occurred on Friday night and Saturday night.

Worrall, 16-year-old George Hindley (blacksmith) and George Higson (fireman) were part of the team who descended into the mine immediately after the explosion. They received the Albert Medal in recognition of their heroism. Worrall received a first-class medal and the Salford Humane Society Gold Hundred Medal.

=== Inquest and report ===
As is normal in England the coroner's inquest into the deaths was opened for evidence of identity and to permit the funerals to take place, and then adjourned before the main proceedings. The adjourned inquest opened on Tuesday, 30 June 1885 and took evidence that day, Wednesday 1 July, Thursday 2 July, Wednesday 8 July and Thursday 9 July. Following the coroner's summing up the jury retired at 12:30 and returned with their verdicts at 15:30 on the second Thursday. Six verdicts were returned, the first three being the causes of death mentioned above. The third verdict went on to blame the gas being ignited by a candle and that "such emission of gas was sudden and unexpected, and that in the opinion of this Jury no person is either criminally or censurably to blame" and in consequence the verdict was death by accident. The jury had been asked to rule on the use of naked lights and in their fourth verdict declined to express any opinion, but did recommend an inquiry by "skilful and experienced persons be appointed for the purpose by the Government". During the inquest reference had been made to an anonymous letter sent to the Inspector of Mines. In the fifth verdict the jury found that he had been justified in withholding the contents from the mine owners. The sixth and final verdict was to recommend the appointment of additional Inspectors of Mines in order to increase the frequency of inspection. A juryman then asked that the thanks of the court be given to the explorers, specifically Worrall, Crook and a man named Issac Johnson. Hall was also praised for his actions and courage. It was hoped that some official recognition would be forthcoming.

Questions about the inquest were raised in the House of Commons on 21 July, but the Secretary of State for the Home Department declined to comment further until the official government report was in.

Present at the inquest was Arnold Morley MP on behalf of the Home Office. Morley wrote his report to Parliament by 31 July. Morley also summarised his findings under six headings, but admitted that only the first dealt with the causes of the explosion. His key findings were: the compulsory use of safety lamps in place of candles, the provision by the owners of the best type of safety lamps, banning smoking in the pit, greater care in the selection of underviewer and firemen, replacing direct furnace ventilation with dumb-drift ventilation of fans, and the "taking of the ventilation on more frequent occasions with measurements of each of the main splits". The fifth point expressed his concern that potentially explosive gases were drawn directly through the furnace. Using an induced draught or fans meant that there should be nothing to ignite escaping gases. The last point referred to measuring ("taking") the quantity of air both at the main downcast shaft and also at those points where the air current split to go to different districts. Morley drew attention to the question the coroner put and the jury's finding of "no person is either criminally or censurably to blame". Morley pointed out that this did not mean that there had been no management faults, merely that they did not meet the higher levels of culpability.

== See also ==
- List of mining disasters in Lancashire
- Glossary of coal mining terminology

== Footnotes ==
=== Bibliography ===
- Albert Medal Recipients, 1 November 2018
- Anon (October 1885), "Popular Miscellany", Popular Science Monthly, vol. 27, p. 858. Coal-Dust and Mine-Explosions.
- Cutler, Peter (26 February 2018), "The Clifton Hall Colliery Explosion 1885, Messers. Andrew Knowles and Sons and the Staffordshire Miners Connection", in Smith, Richard (ed.), Memoirs 2018, British Mining, Nelson, Lancashire: The Northern Mine Research Society, pp. 16–23, ISSN 0308-2199
- Durham Mining Museum (27 December 2012), Andrew Knowles & Sons Ltd
- Flynn, Tony (19 July 2017), Karl (ed.), "From the archives:the Clifton Colliery disaster", Salford Voice, archived from the original on 19 November 2018
- Hansard (21 July 1885), House of Commons Debates, HMSO, cc 1393–1395
- Morley, Arnold, MP (31 July 1885), Report by Arnold Morley, Esq, M.P., upon the circumstances attending a fatal explosion which occurred on the 18th of June, 1885, in the Trencherbone mine of the Clifton Hall Colliery, 19th Century House of Commons Sessional Papers, 1884-85, Vol.XIV, p.813, HMSO
- Northern Mine Research Society (2016), Clifton Hall Colliery (1838-1929)
- Preece, Geoff (1985), Coalmining in Salford, A Photographic Record, City of Salford Cultural Services, ISBN 0-901952-12-5
- Salford Trades Union Council (7 August 2015), Clifton Hall Colliery Disaster, archived from the original on 19 November 2018
- Townley, C. H. A.; Appleton, C. A.; Smith, F. D.; Peden, J. A. (1995), The Industrial railways of Bolton, Bury and the Manchester Coalfield, Part Two, The Manchester Coalfield, Runpast, ISBN 1-870754-32-8
- Workman, John (16 November 2017), "Black Country miners who broke a strike at a Lancashire colliery", Birmingham Mail
