= Haydock Collieries =

Coal operations in Lancashire, England

Coordinates: 53°27′45″N 2°39′0.9″W

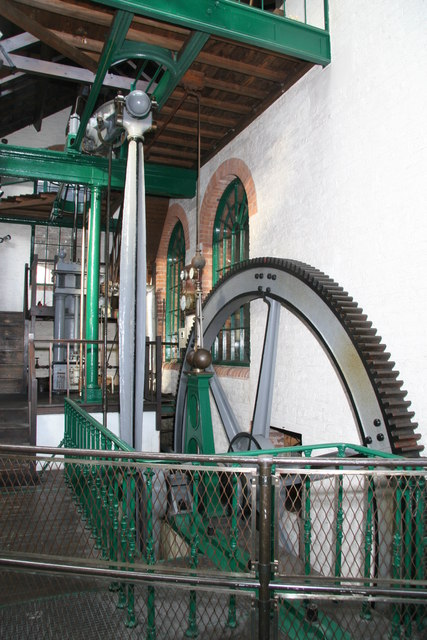
Haydock Colliery beam engine, preserved at the Museum of Science and Industry (Manchester)

Haydock Collieries were collieries situated in and around Haydock on the Lancashire Coalfield, England. The company which operated the collieries was Richard Evans & Co Ltd.

== Background ==
The shallow coal measures in the area had been worked from at least the 18th century when the major landowners were the Leghs of Lyme. Around 1830, the collieries were run by Thomas Legh and William Turner and had a horse-drawn tramway connection to the Sankey Canal. Richard Evans (1778–1864), a printer from Paternoster Row in London, bought a share in Edge Green Colliery in Golborne in 1830. An explosion in May 1831 killed up to twelve workers and the following May another explosion killed another six. In 1831 the collieries were connected to the growing railway network by a branch line to the Warrington and Newton Railway at Newton Junction. Evans bought Legh's share off Turner and Legh's business, which then took the title Turner & Evans. When Turner died, in 1847, Evans acquired his share and the firm took the title Richard Evans & Sons. The company remained in Evans' family ownership until 1889 when it became a public limited company which it remained until the formation of the National Coal Board in 1947.

The collieries had access to considerable coal reserves but the workings were subject to flooding. Ram Pit, sunk in 1901, never went into production because of flooding. Some collieries were connected underground to rationalise winding operations and facilitate ventilation. In 1890 eight collieries were working.

Four of the company's collieries survived to become part of the National Coal Board (NCB) in 1947. They were Golborne, Lyme Pits, Wood Pit and Old Boston employing a total of 3,195 underground and 557 surface workers. The NCB's St.Helens Area Central Workshops were at Haydock until 1963.

== Evans family ==
Richard Evans (1778–1864) married Mary, daughter of Thomas Smith of Portsmouth, on 11 June 1810. They had eight children, Richard (1811–1887), Anne (1812–1883, mother of Charles Pilkington), Mary (1814-1895), Joseph (1817–1889), Ruth (1819–1896), Josiah (1820–1873, father-in-law to Frederick Gardiner), Henry (1823–1878) and Emma (1825-1905). Joseph and Josiah followed their father into the business.

== Collieries ==
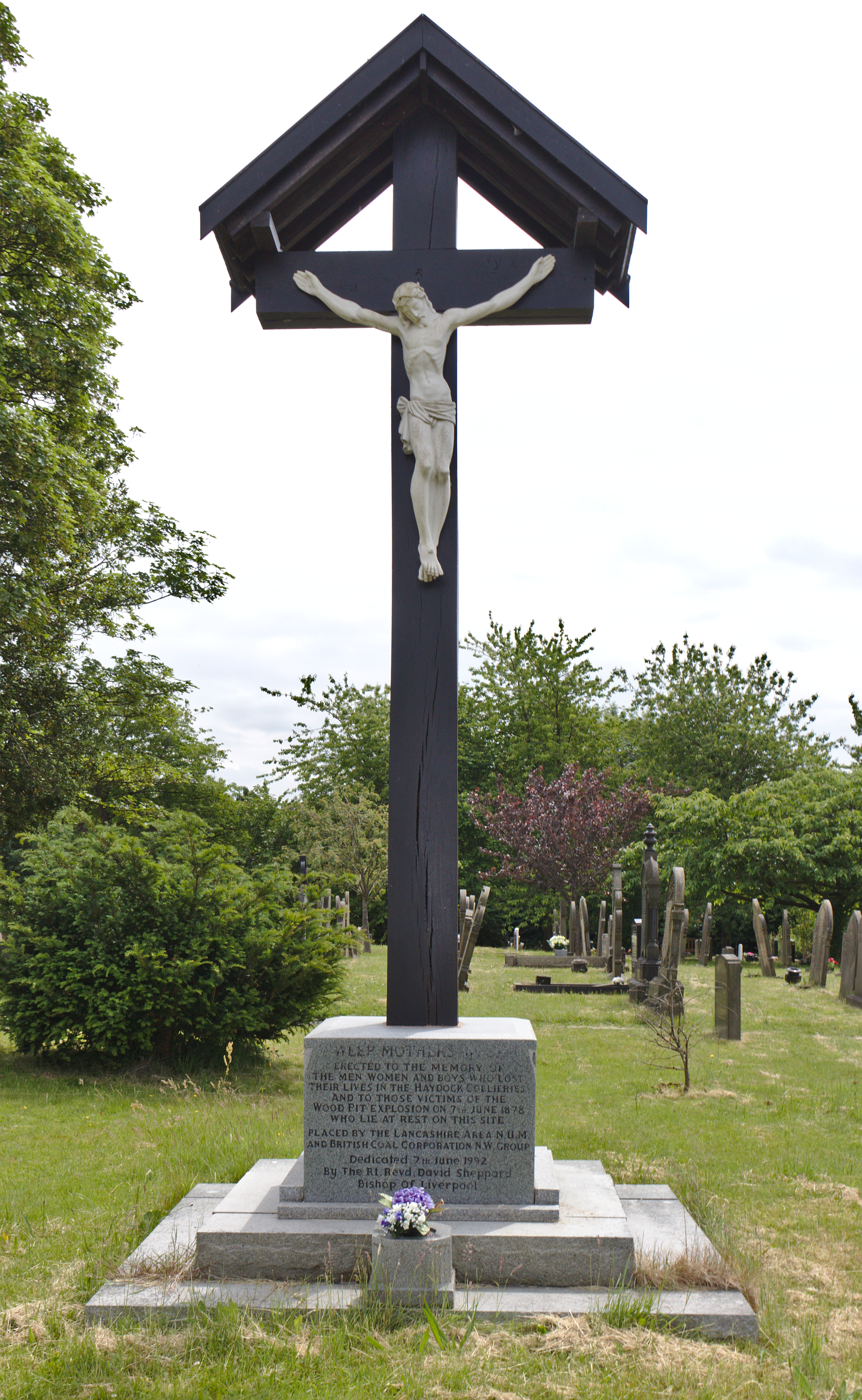
Haydock Mining Disasters Memorial at Saint James' Parish Church, Haydock

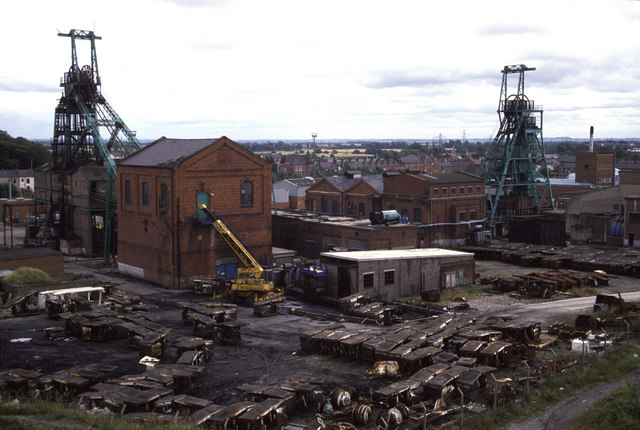
Golborne Colliery

The company owned several collieries in and around Haydock. Among them were:

Bryn Bryn Pit opened around 1870 and lasted until 1919.

Downall Green Downall Green commenced winding in 1860 and lasted for 25 years.

Edge Green Pit opened before 1830 and finished winding coal in 1920.

Engine Engine Pit began winding in 1853 and finished in 1854.

Golborne Colliery Golborne Colliery was started by Edward Johnson in 1878 and bought by Evans and Company in 1880. It was still working 100 years later. In 1975 nearly 1000 men worked at the pit taking coal from the Crombouke, Lower Florida and Ince Six Feet mines.

Haydock Colliery After the colliery closed, its workshops became the NCB Workshops. Its single-cylinder beam engine, used to drive the machinery until 1954, has been preserved.

King Pit King Pit opened in 1891. It was connected underground to the Princess, Queen and Legh Pits.

Legh The Legh Pit opened in 1855 and closed in 1911.

Lyme Pit Shaft sinking started at Lyme Pit in 1876 but was abandoned because the ingress of water could not be overcome by the technology of the time. Work recommenced in 1912 but was interrupted by the onset of the First World War. Work resumed in 1919 and the first coal was produced in 1922. The colliery had three shafts. The downcast shaft, No 1 was 395 yards (361 m) deep and wound coal from the Florida seam. The upcast shaft No 2, wound coal from the Potato Delf and Wigan Four Foot seams and No 3 shaft was used for pumping. The Lyme Pit disaster occurred in February 1930 killing 13 men. In 1964 419 miners and 187 surface workers were employed. The pit closed in March that year.

New Boston Colliery The colliery was sunk in 1854 and lasted until 1910.

New Whint New Whint began winding coal in 1853 and finished a year later.

Newton Colliery Newton Colliery was operational in 1896 and was nationalized in 1947.

North Florida Pit was sunk in 1861 and wound coal until 1870.

Old Boston The Old Boston Pit began winding coal in 1868 and closed in 1952. On 29 June 1900, eight workers were killed when pockets of gas were encountered while shaft sinking. The deepest of its three shafts reached 476 yards. The pit closed after an underground fire in 1952. From 1953 until 1989 the pit-head buildings were used as the Area Training Centre for miners.

Old Fold Old Fold commenced winding coal in 1850 and closed in 1864.

Old Whint Old Whint began winding coal in 1853 and closed the same year.

Parr Colliery Nos 1 and 2 shafts were sunk in 1871 and wound coal until 1926. Nos 3 and 4 shafts were sunk in 1893 and finished winding coal in 1931. No 3 shaft was possibly the Havannah Pit which opened in 1863 and closed in 1889.

Pewfall Pit Pewfall Pit opened in 1860 and closed in 1911.

Princess Pit Princess Pit began winding in 1892 and was worked until 1920. It was linked underground to the King, Queen and Legh Pits.

Queen Pit Queen Pit opened before 1849 and closed in 1920. On 26 December 1868 an explosion killed 26 workers. It was linked underground to the King, Princess and Legh Pits.

Ram Pit, sunk in 1901, never went into production because of flooding.

Wood Pit Wood Pit was sunk in 1866 An explosion on 7 June 1878, the Wood Pit disaster, killed 189 men and boys. It closed in 1971.

== Haydock Foundry ==
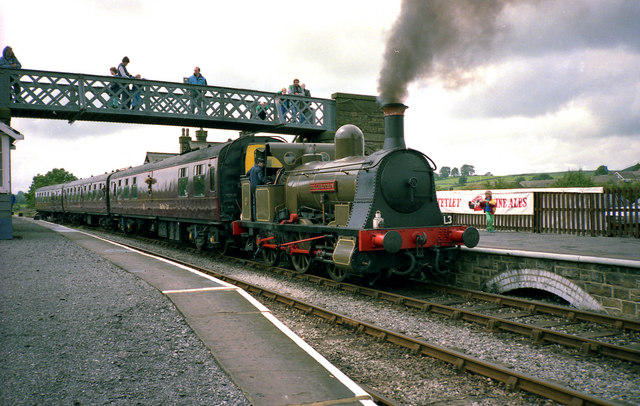
Bellerophon in preservation at Embsay

Haydock Foundry produced six 0-6-0 well tank steam locomotives, designed by Josiah Evans, for the collieries. They had outside Gooch valve gear and piston valves, a very early use of piston valves. They were named Amazon (built 1868), Hercules (1869), Makerfield (1874), Bellerophon (1874), Parr (1886) and Golborne (1887). Bellerophon is preserved at the Foxfield Railway. The locomotives were broadly similar but had some detail differences. The first two had valves driven by rocking levers. The last four had direct drive to the valves. Working pressure was initially 120 psi (830 kPa) but was later raised to 140 psi (970 kPa) and then 160 psi (1,100 kPa). There is some uncertainty about when the higher pressures were applied. Josiah Evans died in 1873 and Smallwood attributes the design changes to his assistant, James Forrest.

1 Preservation

2 Scrapped in 1954

2 Scrapped in 1955

== Colliery railways ==
The collieries were served by railways which linked to the Liverpool and Manchester Railway and the Warrington and Newton Railway. Excepting Edge Green and Golborne Collieries, all Evans' pits were connected by the company's private railway network.

The earliest locomotives for use on the colliery system were obtained from the Vulcan Foundry and Jones and Potts. Little is known about them other than they were mostly tender locomotives of 0-4-0, 0-4-2 or 2-4-0 wheel arrangement. By 1864, 25 locomotives had been purchased. Later locomotives are listed in the following table.

Name	Wheels	Builder	Date	Source	Notes
Ashton	2-2-2	?	?	ex-Hoylake Railway	
Tempest	0-6-0	Vulcan Foundry	?	?	
Fire King	0-6-0	Vulcan Foundry	?	?	
Newton (1st)	0-6-0ST	Sharp Stewart	?	?	
Winsford	?	?	?	?	
Black Diamond	?	?	?	?	
Ant	0-4-0WT	James Cross, St Helens	b.1862	new	
Bee	0-4-0WT	James Cross, St Helens	b.1862	new	
Magnet	0-6-0ST	Fox Walker	b.1864	second hand	
Amazon	0-6-0WT	Haydock Foundry	b.1868	new	
Hercules	0-6-0WT	Haydock Foundry	b.1869	new	
Makerfield	0-6-0WT	Haydock Foundry	b.1874	new	
Bellerophon	0-6-0WT	Haydock Foundry	b.1874	new	Preserved at the Foxfield Railway
Parr	0-6-0WT	Haydock Foundry	b.1886	new	
Golborne	0-6-0WT	Haydock Foundry	b.1887	new	
Garswood	0-4-0ST	Manning Wardle	b.1900	new	
Newton (2nd)	0-6-0ST	Manning Wardle	b.1900	new	
Earlestown	0-6-0ST	Manning Wardle	b.1900	new	
Haydock	0-6-0T	Robert Stephenson	b.1879	new	Preserved at the Penrhyn Castle Railway Museum
1600	0-6-0T	Longhedge Works	a.1940	ex-Southern Railway; LCDR T class	

Notes

- Dates: a. = date acquired, b. = date built

Media related to Bellerophon at Wikimedia Commons

== See also ==
- List of mining disasters in Lancashire
- Glossary of coal mining terminology
