= Margaret Hewitt (sociologist) =

British sociologist and churchwoman (1928–1991)

- Born: 25 October 1928; Pendleton, Salford, Lancashire, England
- Died: 7 June 1991 (aged 62); Exeter, Devon, England

Academic background
- Education: Bedford College, London; London School of Economics
- Thesis: The effect of married women's employment in the cotton textile districts on the organisation and structure of the home in Lancashire, 1840-1880 (1953)

Academic work
- Discipline: Sociologist
- Sub-discipline: Women's studies; childhood studies
- Institutions: University of Exeter

Margaret Hewitt (25 October 1928 – 7 June 1991) was a British sociologist and academic, who was an active laywoman in the Church of England. She lectured in sociology at the University College of the South West and then the University of Exeter, rising to become Reader in Social Institutions in 1970. She was an elected member of the Church Assembly from 1961 to 1970 and then of the General Synod of the Church of England from 1970 until her death. A traditionalist, she was active in opposing the ordination of women and in promoting the use of the Book of Common Prayer.

== Early life and education ==
Hewitt was born on 25 October 1928 in Pendleton, Salford, Lancashire, England. She was the daughter of Jessie Hewitt (née Jones) and Robert Henry Hewitt. She was educated at Pendleton Girls' High School, an all-girls state school. She studied sociology at Bedford College, London, an all-women's college of the University of London. She graduated in 1950 with a first class honours Bachelor of Arts (BA) degree. Having been awarded a University of London Postgraduate Studentship, she undertook further study at the London School of Economics, and completed her Doctor of Philosophy (PhD) degree in 1953. Her doctoral thesis was titled "The effect of married women's employment in the cotton textile districts on the organisation and structure of the home in Lancashire, 1840-1880".

== Academic career ==
In 1952, Hewitt was appointed an assistant lecturer in sociology at the University College of the South West. She was promoted to lecturer in 1954. In 1955, the college received a royal charter and became the University of Exeter. She was promoted to senior lecturer in 1965 and appointed Reader in Social Institutions in 1970. She was made head of the Department of Sociology in 1990. She was also a member of the council and senate of the University of Exeter.

Hewitt's research interests were broadly women, the family, and children. She was not a feminist but was active in women's studies. She edited her doctoral thesis into her first publication, Wives and Mothers in Victorian Industry (1958). Alongside Ivy Pinchbeck, she wrote the two-volumed Children in English Society (1969, 1973), which was a study of the changing social attitudes towards children from the Elizabethan era to the Children Act 1948.

== Church of England ==
Hewitt was a devout Anglican Christian, and belonged to the Prayer Book Catholic wing of the Church of England. In 1961, she was elected to the House of Laity of the Church Assembly, and became a leading member of the "Catholic Group". In 1970, the Church Assembly was replaced with the General Synod of the Church of England, and she continued to be an elected member until her death. She served as a member of the Standing Committee of the General Synod from 1976. From 1977 to 1987, she served as a member of the Crown Appointments Commission which appoints diocesan bishops in the Church of England.

Hewitt was a vocal opponent of the ordination of women: she believed that the Church of England could not independently decide to ordain women and that such a matter could only be decided by an ecumenical council. She also argued that as a priest acted In persona Christi, this role could not be filled by a woman because Jesus was a man. In 1986, she was one of the founders of "Women Against the Ordination of Women", an organisation that would grow to be larger in membership than their opposite number, the "Movement for the Ordination of Women", by 1991. She continued to act as national co-ordinator for Women Against the Ordination of Women until her death.

Hewitt was a member of the Prayer Book Society, an organisation that promoted the Book of Common Prayer for services in every parish in England.

In addition to her synodal roles, she was on the governing bodies of two Anglican theological colleges: the evangelical Trinity College, Bristol (1980 to 1985), and the central Salisbury and Wells Theological College (from 1985).

== Personal life ==
Hewitt never married nor had any children.

Hewitt had cancer, and had continued working until she was admitted to hospital a week before her death. She died on 7 June 1991 in Exeter, Devon, England, aged 62.

== Selected works ==
- Hewitt, Margaret (1959). Wives & Mothers in Victorian Industry. London: Rockliff.
- Pinchbeck, Ivy; Hewitt, Margaret (1969). Children in English Society Volume I: From Tudor Times to the Eighteenth Century. London: Routledge & Kegan Paul. ISBN 978-1487581282.
- Pinchbeck, Ivy; Hewitt, Margaret (1973). Children in English Society Volume II: From the eighteenth century to the Children Act 1948. London: Routledge & Kegan Paul. ISBN 978-0710075802.
