= Agecroft Colliery =

Coal mine in Lancashire, England

Coordinates: 53.502591°N 2.293407°W

Agecroft Colliery was a coal mine on the Manchester Coalfield that opened in 1844 in the Agecroft district of Pendlebury, Lancashire, England. It exploited the coal seams of the Middle Coal Measures of the Lancashire Coalfield. The colliery had two spells of use; the first between 1844 and 1932, when the most accessible coal seams were exploited, and a second lease of life after extensive development in the late 1950s to access the deepest seams.

== First colliery (1844–1932) ==
Andrew Knowles acquired the lease of coal under the Agecroft estate in 1823 and his colliery is shown on a 1830 plan alongside the Manchester, Bolton and Bury Canal not far from old workings near Park House Bridge. Two shafts were sunk by Andrew Knowles and Sons in 1844. The colliery's screens and surface buildings were modernised in the early 1890s and No 3 and No 4 shafts were sunk to 700 yards to the Trencherbone mine starting in 1894 and continuing into 1900. They allowed working in an area to the south of the Pendleton Fault. The fault to the north, with a displacement of 695 metres to the northeast, formed a natural boundary to the colliery. The colliery was located close (less than a mile) from Clifton Hall Colliery (Lumns Lane, Clifton). A tunnel linked the two collieries which allowed 122 men and boys to escape from the upper seams following the 1885 Clifton Hall Colliery disaster. The colliery had access to the Manchester and Bolton Railway line and the Manchester, Bolton and Bury Canal. In 1896 Agecroft Nos 1 & 2 pits employed 371 underground and 111 surface workers while Agecroft Nos 3 & 4 employed 15 underground and 39 on the surface. In 1923 Nos 1 and 2 pits employed 272 workers and Nos 3 and 4 a total of 371. Floor upheaval on 4 November 1926 resulted in the deaths of six miners.

Andrew Knowles and Sons was merged into Manchester Collieries in 1929 and Nos 1 and 2 pits closed the following year. Nos 3 and 4 pits closed in July 1932 but the shafts were retained for pumping to drain nearby collieries.

== Second colliery (1960–1991) ==
In the late 1940s and early 1950s, the National Coal Board (NCB), aware that coal reserves in its collieries were becoming exhausted, looked at re-opening Agecroft. The NCB carried out deep-hole boring in July 1951. In total seven boreholes were drilled; the deepest to 3,790 feet (1,155 metres). In early 1953 it was deduced that there was an estimated 80 million tonnes of workable coal in seams varying from 2 ft 2½ in to 7 ft 0 in (68 cm to 213 cm) in thickness.

Agecroft Colliery was redeveloped by the NCB in the 1950s reusing No 3 and No 4 shafts and sinking a new shaft. It cost £9 million to realign and restructure the pit. The colliery was situated between Agecroft Road (A6044), Dell Avenue and the Manchester to Bolton railway line. The old Nos 3 and 4 shafts were reused and a new No 5 shaft was sunk (2,000 feet in depth, 24 feet in diameter) for coal winding using a Koepe-type winding tower. A tunnelling programme commenced in August 1957 and 11,000 yards of tunnel were driven to allow for the development of the initial output. New surface buildings were built and the colliery was substantially complete by 1960. The first coal winding began in August 1960.

=== Disaster of 1958 ===
In 1958, while construction workers were sinking shafts, an underground explosion killed one man and injured twelve, trapping them at the bottom of the 1,900-foot (580 m) shaft. The accident was attributed to a misunderstanding in signalling, when men at the top mistakenly believed that the men at the bottom had left the pit and commenced demolition sending tonnes of rock and debris down the shaft.

=== Final years of operation ===
The colliery became known as one where most of the workforce did not observe the miners' strike in 1984–85, which led to some violence in May and a subsequent visit by Chris Butcher (nicknamed "Silver Birch") to support the working miners.

The colliery closed in March 1991 and demolition began later that year.

== Agecroft Power Station ==
The colliery's main customer was the Central Electricity Generating Board’s Agecroft Power Station close to the River Irwell. Coal was transported directly to the power station via an enclosed conveyor belt on a bridge over Agecroft Road (A6044). Some coal was moved by merry-go-round coal hopper trains shuttling between coal mines and the power station. Its closure was announced in November 1992 and demolition on the site commenced in 1993 culminating in the destruction of its four cooling towers in May 1994.

== Redevelopment ==
In the late 1990s, a business enterprise park opened on the colliery site. Much of the land remains unused. An international rail freight terminal was planned next to the Manchester to Bolton railway line but, though a spur line was built, the development did not materialise. A housing development has been built on Agecroft Road on the Thermalite factory site and a prison, HMP Forest Bank and Youth Offenders' Institute, built close to the power station site. The land has been landscaped, and footpaths constructed to encourage recreational use.

Swinton RLFC plans to build a 6,000-seat stadium on land immediately east of the Manchester, Bolton and Bury Canal between Agecroft Road and the prison.

== See also ==
- List of mining disasters in Lancashire
- Glossary of coal mining terminology
