= Bryn Hall Colliery =

Former coal mine in Ashton-in-Makerfield, England

Coordinates: 53.5068°N 2.6324°W

Bryn Hall Colliery was a coal mine on the Lancashire Coalfield in Bryn, Ashton-in-Makerfield, Greater Manchester then in the historic county of Lancashire, England. The colliery was first worked 1859 to 1864 by Smith & Sons before ownerships transferred in 1866 by Crippin and Smethurst who left the partnership a year later. It was owned by Crippin and Sons in 1868, W and B J Crippen in 1871 and in 1873 William Crippin, the owner was sinking new pits. The owners between 1875 and 1886 were W and E F Crippen followed by E F Crippen and H H Crippen up to 1892.

In 1908 the colliery had five shafts and employed 400 workers underground and 150 above ground. The colliery was managed by Peter Gorton, and his undermanagers were T Pownall, John Grundy and P Bullough.

The colliery was closed in 1945. Today the colliery site is a privately owned and consists of agricultural land, housing and a water ski lake, to the north east of the Three Sisters Recreation Area.

== Disasters ==
On 19 August 1870 an explosion ripped through the colliery, killing 20 workers. On 2 June 1873 there were more explosions in which six shotfirers were killed.

== In popular culture ==
George Orwell visited the colliery in 1936 when he was gathering material for his book The Road to Wigan Pier.

== See also ==
- List of mining disasters in Lancashire
- Glossary of coal mining terminology
