= Wood Pit disaster =

1878 English mining accident

Coordinates: 53°27′45″N 2°39′0.9″W

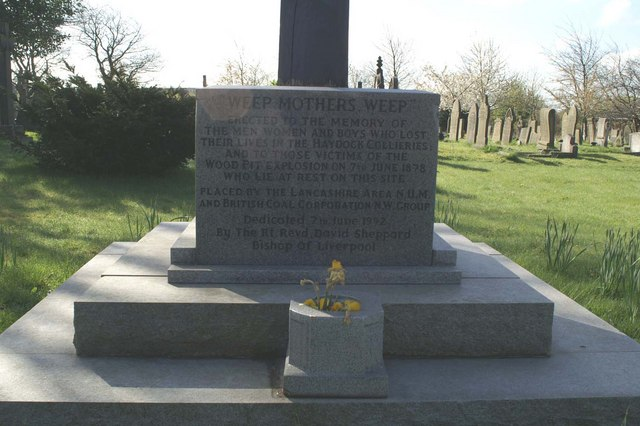
Haydock Mining Disasters Memorial at Saint James' Parish Church, Haydock

The Wood Pit disaster was a mining accident on 7 June 1878, when an underground gas explosion occurred at the Wood Pit, in Haydock, then in the historic county of Lancashire, in North West England. The official death toll was 189 although contemporary reports at first stated that over 200 had been killed.

== Background ==
The Wood Pit was one of at least 20 collieries in the area operated by the mining company Haydock Collieries. It consisted of the Ravenhead mine and the Florida mine which were linked by a tunnel. (Note: In this part of Lancashire a coal seam is referred to as a mine and the coal mine as a colliery or pit.) The pit had been sunk in 1866. There had been at least two previous major explosions in the area, claiming 26 lives in April 1869 and 58 in December of the same year. The pit had a chronic problem with firedamp and as a precaution, explosives were never used, with miners relying on picks to manually extract the coal. In addition, workers were equipped with specially designed safety lamps to prevent accidental ignition of gas.

Most of the mine workers were from Haydock although some came from the neighbouring towns of Ashton-in-Makerfield, Earlestown and Newton-le-Willows. Many of the "drawers", who carried the coal from the mine, were sub-contracted, meaning that their names did not appear on the company's list of employees.

== Explosion ==
On the morning of Friday 7 June approximately 250 men were working in the pit, 18 in the Ravenhead mine and the rest in the Florida mine. The explosion occurred at 11 am in the Florida mine and was accompanied by a collapse of the coal face. The workers in the Ravenhead mine were successfully evacuated but in the Florida mine there were no initial reports of survivors. Large crowds gathered at the pit head as rescue workers searched the mine and recovered the bodies. The bodies that were brought to the surface were reported to be "shockingly mutilated" by the force of the explosion.

On 8 June the Chief Inspector of Mines Joseph Dickinson reported to the Home Secretary (R. A. Cross) that he had joined the "explorers" in the mine but that attempts to recover the bodies or locate survivors were being hampered by the continued presence of gas and the failure of the ventilation apparatus.

The best explanation of the presence of gas appeared to be that it had escaped from a notoriously dangerous coal seam deeper down the mine known as the "fiery 9ft", but the reason for the ignition was never found.

== Aftermath ==
On Sunday 9 June (Whit Sunday) the local Anglican priest Henry Sherlock, having spent the previous day visiting the bereaved families, was visibly distressed as he preached at St James the Great Church, using as his text John 14:18 ("I will not leave you comfortless. I will come to you.")

By 10 June it was tentatively reported that there had been 182 deaths with 16 seriously injured survivors. Many families suffered multiple bereavements: the Boon family lost eight members including Nathan Boon and his four sons.

A fund-raising campaign organised by Lord Derby raised £25,000 for the widows and orphans.

== Memorials ==
Thirty of the men and boys who died at Wood Pit were interred in the graveyard of St James the Great Anglican Church, Haydock where a memorial was subsequently erected. A second memorial was erected closer to the site of the disaster in 2009.

== See also ==
List of mining disasters in Lancashire
