= Pendleton Colliery =

Coordinates: 53.506°N 2.293°W

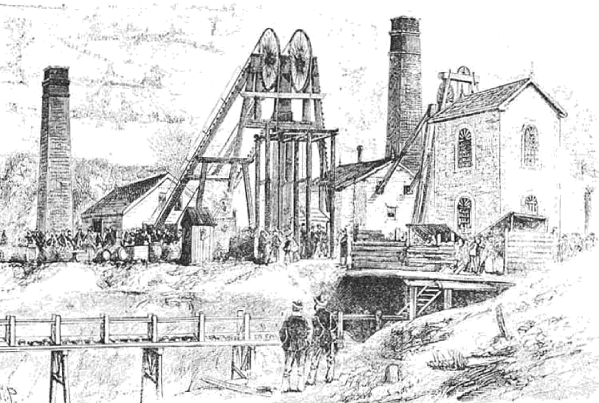

Pendleton Colliery was a coal mine operating on the Manchester Coalfield after the late 1820s on Whit Lane in Pendleton, Salford, then in the historic county of Lancashire, England.

== John Fitzgerald era ==
John Purcell Fitzgerald, Member of Parliament and estate owner, started to sink shafts to the Three Foot and Worsley Four Foot mines at Whit Lane, Pendleton on his estate in the late 1820s. The shafts were on the west side of the Manchester, Bolton and Bury Canal. George Stephenson's brother, Robert (1788–1837), supervised operations as manager and engineer until his death in 1837. In 1832 he was able to report to Fitzgerald that the four foot seam had been reached.

The original shaft was sunk to a depth of around 650 feet and in the first six months of 1832 the colliery produced nearly 27,000 tons of coal. The shaft was closed after flooding in 1834. In 1835, Fitzgerald formed the Pendleton Colliery Company, with George Stephenson as a director, and leased nearby land from the Duchy of Lancaster for new mining works. In 1836, the colliery supplied at least 215,000 tons of coal to Manchester by road, 24 per cent of the city's total demand. Robert Stephenson supervised the sinking of two eight-feet diameter shafts to deeper, drier seams below the Worsley Four Foot in 1836–37 and a steam engine of around 40 horsepower was installed. The new shaft was on the east bank of the canal where a short branch terminated in the pit yard. In 1840 the shaft reached coal at a depth of 1,392 feet. The new workings undertaken by the company were expected to generate profits of £14,000 per annum but the colliery suffered from problems relating to water ingress throughout its existence.

By 1840 the coal faces of the Albert and Crombourke mines were 1,400 feet below the surface. More flooding in 1843 caused the pit to close when it employed nearly 1,000 people and produced 1,000 tons of coal per day. The lower sections of the new shafts, which were around 1,590 feet deep, were lined with cast iron tubbing in an attempt to restrain water ingress. A design flaw was being rectified at the time of the flooding, which newspapers attributed to the closure of two nearby collieries that had shut down due to flooding and the absence of their pumping mechanisms had increased the volume of water present. Newspapers reported that Fitzgerald's losses as a result of the ingress — which was initially termed a "destruction" by the Morning Post — were at least £50,000. By the end of 1843 a beam engine with a 75-inch stroke had been installed to clear the water. The colliery was still closed in June 1846, by which time more than 157 million gallons of water had been pumped out and the coal lay 100 yards below the water level. Mining operations recommenced in January 1847 and were marked with a celebratory procession through the streets of Manchester and Salford but the disaster had ruined some of the company's directors and in 1848 Fitzgerald filed for bankruptcy. His son noted in 1843 that

My father, after spending £100,000 on a colliery, besides losses by everlasting rogues, runaway agents, etc., has just been drowned out of it ... So end the hopes of eighteen years; and he is near seventy, left without his only hobby! ... [H]e is come to the end of his purse. (Note: The bankruptcy hearing for Fitzgerald concluded that the Pendleton Colliery Company partnership had amassed losses of over £140,000.)

Jack Nadin says that the colliery was closed in 1848 but D. R. Fisher says Fitzgerald continued mining somewhere and there are numerous newspaper advertisements after 1848 that list the address of Fitzgerald's agent, Hugh Higson, as being that of the colliery. Under the provisions of bankruptcy, the lease was offered for sale in 1852, which was the year that Fitzgerald died. The lease covered approximately 280 acres of land, the associated mineral rights and plant and machinery. At that time, the seams being worked were the Albert mine, the Binn mine, the New Six Foot and the Seven Foot.

== Andrew Knowles and Sons ==
Andrew Knowles and Sons bought the underlease in 1852. The company developed the colliery by sinking new shafts on the east side of the canal in 1857 to access the Rams mine at 1,545 feet and the shafts on the west side of the canal were abandoned. As the coal was worked from coal seams that dipped at 1-in-3, Pendleton became the deepest coal mine in the country when the workings reached 3,600 feet where the temperature at the coal face reached 100 degrees Fahrenheit.

Andrew Knowles and Sons relined the upcast shaft in 1872 reducing its diameter to 7 feet 2 inches, giving Pendleton the record for the narrowest shaft. In 1891 the company decided to modernise the colliery by sinking two 16 feet-diameter shafts but water from old workings broke through causing flooding and subsidence and the shafts were abandoned. A screening plant and wagon loading facility were built on the canal's west bank alongside the Manchester and Bolton Railway line linked to the pit by a bridge built in 1894. A small engine shed and sidings were built to connect with the railway by January 1895. A saddletank locomotive supplied by Manning Wardle in 1901 was named Knowles.

In 1896 Pendleton Nos. 1 & 2 pits employed 441 underground and 126 surface workers and in 1933 employed 272 underground and 117 on the surface.

Ground upheaval in the Rams mine caused five deaths in 1925.

The colliery became part of Manchester Collieries in 1929 by which time the Albert and Crombouke mines were exhausted. The new owners fitted new headgear to No. 1 shaft in 1931. The colliery closed in 1939 when coal in the Rams mine was exhausted. The colliery site was subsequently used by the Manchester Oxide Company to process spent iron oxide.

== See also ==
- List of mining disasters in Lancashire
