= Ivy Pinchbeck =

British economic and social historian

Ivy Pinchbeck (9 April 1898 – 10 May 1982) was a British economic and social historian, specialising in the history of women. Her book of 1930, Women Workers and the Industrial Revolution, 1750 – 1850 was a pioneering effort in women's history, and highly influential in the next half-century. She concluded that women overall gained more than they lost from the Industrial Revolution, as compared to the dangers and unsanitary and harsh working conditions of the previous era.

== Life ==
Pinchbeck studied at University of Nottingham, graduating B.A. in 1920; at London School of Economics, M.A., 1927 and Ph.D., 1930. She taught in the Department of Sociology, Social Studies and Economics at Bedford College, University of London from 1929 to 1961.

In her acclaimed work, Women workers and the industrial revolution, 1750–1850, based on her Ph.D. thesis, Pinchbeck argued that in the long run, the Industrial Revolution increased women's employment opportunities, was beneficial to women's social and economic position and therefore was a liberating factor. This conclusion was in contrast to the earlier view of Alice Clark, who believed that industrial capitalism was responsible for the exclusion of women from paid employment, and thus played a crucial role in modern women's oppression.

Pinchbeck's two-volume Children in English Society, co-authored with Margaret Hewitt, a former student, described the conditions of poor and orphaned children, from the sixteenth to the twentieth centuries, and discussed how legislative and voluntary responses to them had changed over the period.

== Bibliography ==
- I. Pinchbeck, Women workers and the industrial revolution, 1750-1850 (1930)
- I. Pinchbeck, ‘Social Attitudes to the Problem of Illegitimacy’ in British Journal of Sociology, 5 (Dec,1954), pp. 309–323
- I. Pinchbeck, ‘State and the Child in Sixteenth-Century England’ in British Journal of Sociology, 7 (Dec,56), pp. 273–285 and 8 (Mar,57), pp. 59–74
- I. Pinchbeck with M. Hewitt, Children in English Society. 2 vols ( 1969)
