= List of mining disasters in Lancashire =

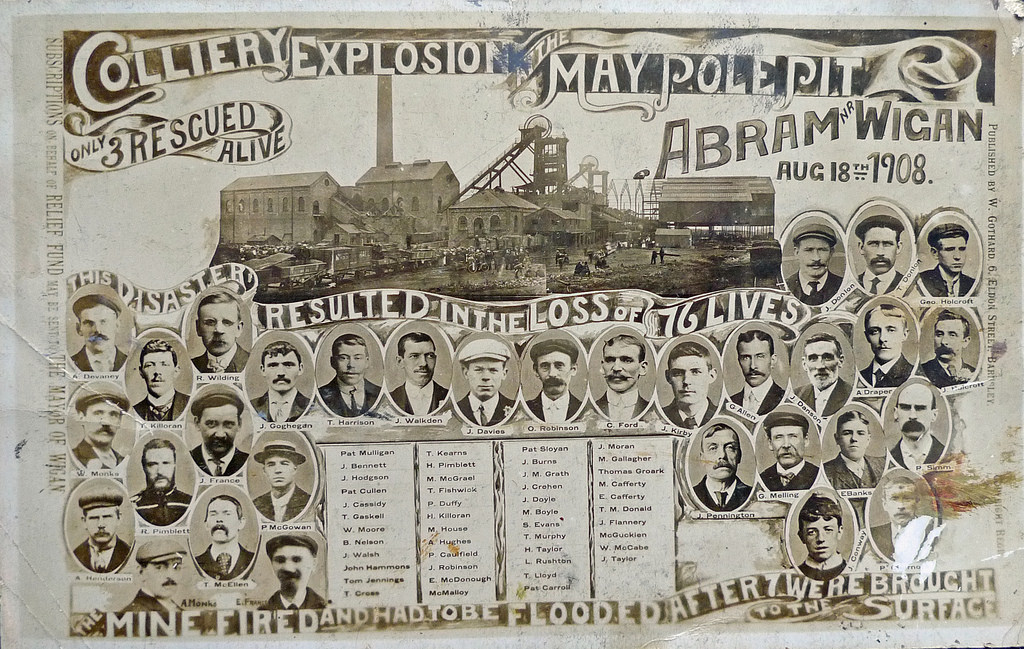
Fundraising postcard issued after the Maypole Colliery disaster in which 76 men were killed in 1908

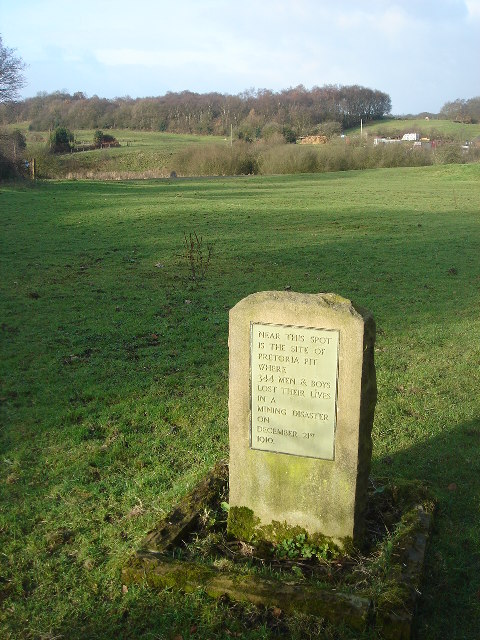
Monument to the Pretoria Pit disaster in which 344 men died in 1910

This is a list of mining accidents in the historic county of Lancashire at which five or more people were killed. Mining deaths have occurred wherever coal has been mined across the Lancashire Coalfield. The earliest deaths were recorded in parish registers. Ffrancis Taylior was buried at the Collegiate Church in Manchester after a fall in the "coale pitte" in 1622 and in 1661 or 1662, Thomas Hilton was "slain" at Bradford coal pit as was Thos Greene in 1664. Coal pit related deaths appear in the registers of Wigan Parish Church from the 1670s. In 1779 three "Poor Coaliers" were reported as being injured when the roof collapsed in a coal pit at Alkrington so that "their lives were dispared of..."

When the coal industry developed rapidly in the 19th century, labour and life were cheap. Men, women and children perished in explosions, roof falls, floods and haulage accidents. The Lancashire Coalfield, the seventh largest producer of coal in the 1870s, often had the highest accident figures. William Pickard, the miners' agent, championed the formation of the Lancashire and Cheshire Miners' Permanent Relief Society in 1872 after a spate of disasters that caused great distress and hardship, leaving widows and families destitute.

Most fatalities were caused by firedamp, some caused by the miners who took the tops off the safety lamps that were designed to protect them because of the poor light they gave out. Some mineowners turned a blind eye to the use of candles in even the gassiest coal seams.

To regulate working conditions, the government passed Acts of Parliament: the 1842 Act prohibited the employment of females and boys under 10 years old and appointed a single inspector, but inspections were few and breaches were common. Acts passed in subsequent years led to the appointment of more inspectors and increased their powers to regulate how mines were operated and the working conditions and welfare of the miners.

After disasters the first rescuers were colliery managers and volunteer colleagues who descended into the pits to look for signs of life, rescue the injured, seal off underground fires and recover bodies while working in dangerous conditions sometimes at great cost to themselves. Apart from safety lamps to detect gases, they had no special equipment. They were the predecessors of the mines rescue teams. Mines rescue stations were recommended in a Royal Commission in 1886 but were not compulsory until after the Coal Mines Act 1911 (1 & 2 Geo. 5. c. 50) was passed. In 1906 a committee of the Lancashire and Cheshire Coal Owners Association decided to provide a mines rescue station at Howe Bridge. Its trained rescuers were present at the Maypole and Pretoria Pit disasters. They also trained teams of men in pits throughout the coalfield. Boothstown Mines Rescue Station opened in November 1933 close to the East Lancashire Road. It replaced stations at Howe Bridge, Denton, St Helens and Burnley.

== 1830s ==
Date	Colliery	Location	Notes	Deaths
24 April 1830	Pemberton Colliery	Pemberton	An explosion killed nine workers.	9
May 1831	Haydock Collieries	Haydock	An explosion at one of the coal pits in Haydock killed up to twelve workers.	12
May 1832	Haydock Collieries	Haydock	An explosion killed up to six workers.	6
10 July 1835	Ladyshore Colliery	Little Lever, Bolton	Ten men and seven boys were drowned after water from the River Croal inundated the pit workings. The colliery was situated on both sides of the Manchester, Bolton and Bury Canal near where the Croal meets the River Irwell.	17

== 1840s ==
Date	Colliery	Location	Notes	Deaths
24 November 1846	Coppull Collieries	Coppull	Burgh Colliery was one of numerous pits and shafts that were collectively known as Coppull Collieries. Four years after the Mines and Collieries Act 1842 had passed into law, three of the nine victims of an explosion were girls. A collier lit a candle in the workings before the fireman had inspected them causing accumulated gas to explode.	9
June 1847	Kirkless Hall Colliery	Aspull near Wigan	Thirteen men and boys were killed after a shot was fired causing an explosion of firedamp.	13

== 1850s ==
Date	Colliery	Location	Notes	Deaths
11 February 1850	Gibfield Colliery	Atherton	The workers descended the pit belonging to Fletchers and discovered the presence of gas which they tried to disperse with their jackets. The gas fired at the flame of a lighted candle causing an explosion which killed five men and burned several others.	5
16 March 1850	Haydock Collieries Rock Pit	Haydock	Thirteen men were killed in an explosion at Haydock Collieries' Rock Pit. Candles were in use in the pit even though the men had run away from a fire the day before.	13
12 April 1850,	Town House Colliery	Great Marsden near Burnley	The pit was worked by Spenser Wilson and Company. Six men were working in the pit when one man went to check for gas with a safety lamp but before he signalled it was safe, another man removed the top from his lamp causing an explosion that killed them all.	6
9 October 1850	Bent Grange Colliery	Oldham	Butterworth's pit was in the centre of Oldham. An explosion killed 16 or 17 workers. The pit had a single shaft. About twenty five colliers were at work in the Riley mine (seam) when a roof fall broke the wire gauze of a Davy lamp causing an explosion.	16 or 17
8 November 1850	Haydock Collieries No.13 Pit	Haydock	About twenty men and boys and four ponies were working in Turner and Evans' No. 13 pit when an explosion killed ten, injured several others and killed all the ponies. The men worked with candles and the pit was not routinely inspected for gas before work started.	20
17 March 1851	Heys Colliery	Ashton-under-Lyne	The pit was the property of John Kenworthy and Brothers. According to the inspector's report by Mr Dickinson, an explosion of firedamp killed one man and injured eight more, five of them subsequently died from their injuries.	6
22 December 1851	Ince Hall Colliery Deep Pit	Ince-in-Makerfield	Shortly after a hundred men and boys descended into the 1,242 feet Deep Pit, an explosion caused by inflammable gas coming into contact with a candle killed 13 workers, the oldest was 65 years of age and the youngest were four boys aged 15.	13
18 February 1852	Roscoe and Lords Colliery	Rochdale	In very bad weather, water burst into the main level of the colliery. The pit was 54 yards deep and the main drift 260 yards long. Some men near the shaft bottom managed to get into the cage and were drawn to the surface. Eight men were drowned in the rising water but two men and two boys in the upper workings ran until they reached the top of the drift but before the water reached them it subsided and they escaped.	8
24 April 1852	Norley Hall Colliery	Pemberton	The pit's shafts were 480 feet deep. An explosion in the Engine Pit on a Friday night when most of the colliers had left the pit, claimed twelve lives, mostly boys aged 15 and under who worked as drawers. After the explosion all the workers were supplied with safety lamps.	12
20 May 1852	Coppull Hall Colliery	Coppull	The colliery was the property of John Hargreaves. It had two shafts but the small furnace for ventilation at the bottom of the upcast shaft was seldom used. A shaft sunk after the previous explosion to increase ventilation was 210 yards deep and 360 yards from the Coppull shaft. The colliery worked the fiery Arley mine. The colliers and drawers had to provide their own safety lamps and some risked using candles. An explosion on killed 36 men and boys, the oldest aged 41 and the youngest a boy of 9 whose father also died.	36
24 March 1853	Ince Hall Colliery	Ince-in-Makerfield	The Ince Hall Coal and Cannel Company's colliery worked the Arley mine at a depth of 414 yards It was one of a cluster of eight pits about one mile east of Wigan near the Leeds and Liverpool Canal. Although it was a fiery seam, the coal was worked with naked lights and on 24 March 1853 an explosion killed fifty men and boys.	50
1 July 1853	Bent Grange Colliery	Oldham	The colliery was owned by Thomas Butterworth who, after the explosion in October 1850, had been told by the inspector that the ventilation of the mine was defective. A second shaft was sunk but another explosion killed 20 men and boys, 13 were suffocated by afterdamp and seven were burnt to death.	20
18 February 1854	Ince Hall Colliery	Ince-in-Makerfield	Another explosion occurred in Ince Hall Colliery's Arley mine in 1854. An explosion of firedamp in the same pit had occurred in the previous year and the recommendations of Her Majesty’s Inspector, Joseph Dickinson had been followed. Ventilation had been improved but the Arley mine was notoriously "fiery" and explosions had occurred in other pits where it was mined. The explosion cost 89 lives, 37 of the victims were burnt and the rest died from suffocation by the afterdamp.	89
11 November 1854	Bellfield Colliery	Rochdale	The colliery was owned by John Knowles and Company. Three men and four boys were killed by falling down the shaft in the cage when a link in the coupling chain at the end of the shaft rope broke.	7
2 February 1858	Bardsley Colliery Diamond Pit	Bardsley	An explosion of firedamp ignited by shot firing at Bardsley Colliery's Diamond Pit between Oldham and Ashton-under-Lyne killed 53 men and boys.	53
13 December 1858	Yew Tree Colliery	Tyldesley	An explosion of firedamp killed 25 men and boys. It was the worst mining disaster to occur in the town.	25
6 January 1859	Agecroft Colliery	Pendlebury	The colliery in the Irwell Valley belonged to Andrew Knowles and Sons. Twenty men were waiting to be raised to the surface at about 9.30 in the morning. Four boys aged from 12 to 16 years and three men, the oldest 60 and the youngest aged 20, were in the cage when it overwound at speed and was pulled into the headgear. The safety catch failed and the cage plunged down the shaft killing all on board.	7

== 1860s ==
Date	Colliery	Location	Notes	Deaths
1 November 1861	Shevington Colliery Albert Pit	Shevington	The colliery's Prince Albert Pit was one of numerous small pits around Shevington and Appley Bridge to the west of Wigan. Its shaft was sunk to 260 yards and candles were permitted in the workings. An explosion of firedamp killed 13 men and boys. All the victims were overcome by afterdamp. The explosion was caused by gas coming into contact with an open flame.	13
5 January 1865	Douglas Bank Colliery	Wigan	The colliery was situated near Pagefield Lock on the Leeds and Liverpool Canal in Wigan. Shaft sinking began in 1863 and by 1865 a depth of 500 yards had been reached. Eight men were being lowered to the workings in a hoppet (a large bucket) when it stopped in the shaft for no apparent reason. A second hoppet was attached to the winding gear and men were lowered into the shaft to investigate. Explosives used in sinking had caused the shaft walling at the pit bottom to collapse burying the first hoppet and the men. Working parties removed load after load of bricks and rubble and three men were rescued but five who had been thrown out were killed.	8
12 September 1865	California Pit	Aspull	The pit belonged to Kirkless Hall Coal and Iron, a company that owned several pits, coke works and ironworks near the Leeds and Liverpool Canal in Aspull. At the end of the shift, 277 men and boys working the Arley mine at 315 yards below the surface, began ascending the shaft. The two-decker cage raised the workers in groups of eight. After many colliers had been raised, and the cage once again rose in the shaft, the steel winding rope slipped off the drum causing it to snap and plunged the cage down the shaft. Workers waiting at the pit bottom had just enough time to rush back before the cage plunged into the sump followed by the steel rods that guided the cage in the shaft. Eight bodies were recovered but the reason for the 3 3/4-inch rope snapping was never determined.	8
13 May 1866	Garswood Colliery	Garswood, Ashton-In-Makerfield	Thirteen men and boys died in an explosion at Garswood Colliery on 13 May 1866.	13
30 May 1867	Mesne Lea Colliery	Worsley	The old pit was sunk in 1824 off Walkden Road. An explosion killed seven men in May 1867. The pit was considered to be safe as little methane had been encountered and the men used candles. The explosion resulted when gas was ignited by an open flame.	7
26 November 1868	Hindley Green Colliery Springs Pit	Hindley Green	The colliery employed nearly 300 men and boys. An explosion in the colliery's Springs Pit occurred in the Arley mine at 8.40am. Rescue teams were organised and some men and boys were raised from the workings, some suffering from the effect of afterdamp. The rescue party found 62 men and boys had been suffocated by afterdamp and some were badly burned by flames from the ventilation furnace.	62
21 December 1868	Norley Colliery	Pemberton	An explosion in the No. 2 and No. 3 Pits at Norley Colliery in Pemberton occurred just as four men and a pony had descended into the pit. Seven men and the pony were killed when gas exploded.	7
30 December 1868	Haydock Collieries Queen Pit	Haydock	An explosion of gas after a roof fall in the Queen Pit killed 26 men.	26
21 July 1869	Haydock Collieries Queen Pit	Haydock	Another explosion in the Queen Pit killed 59 men. It probably occurred after gas released by roof falls was ignited by shot firing.	59
7 January 1869	Rainford Collieries	Rainford	The colliery, started around 1848, had eight shafts. At the time of the accident, No. 7 shaft was the upcast and No. 8 the downcast. The ventilation furnace set fire to coal at the upcast shaft and spread to the down brow. Water pipes were lowered into the downcast shaft. The fire caused an explosion of gas. Nine men died.	9
16 November 1869	Low Hall Colliery	Platt Bridge near Wigan	The colliery was operated by the Moss Hall Coal Company, it had eight shafts. An explosion of gas in the Six Feet seam caused by shotfiring killed 27 men and boys and started an underground fire. The fire was extinguished after the pit was flooded with water taken from the aqueduct that supplied Liverpool with water from the Rivington Reservoirs.	27

== 1870s ==
Date	Colliery	Location	Notes	Deaths
4 February 1870	Pendleton Colliery	Pendleton, Salford	An explosion caused when powder was blown out of a shot firing hole resulted in the death of six men.	6
19 August 1870	Bryn Hall Colliery	Bryn, Ashton-in-Makerfield	The colliery was sunk in about 1856 by Smith and Sons. It was owned by W & B J Crippen at the time of the disaster. The explosion was heard for miles around and damaged both the shafts. A hoppet (large bucket) was set up to raise about 100 miners working in another part of the mine before search parties could begin the task of exploring for survivors and victims. Fifteen survivors found suffering from afterdamp were raised to the surface and twenty men died.	20
6 September 1871	Ince Moss Colliery	Ince in Makerfield	An explosion occurred in Pearson and Knowles' Moss Pits where men were working in the Nine Foot and Cannel mines. Two sinkers were descending the upcast shaft in a hoppet (large bucket) when an explosion damaged the headgear and discharged large volumes of smoke. After fixing the winding gear the hoppet was drawn uop and found to be empty. It was lowered again and returned with five colliers from the Cannel mine who said the explosion was in the Nine Foot. An exploring party including the miners' agent William Pickard descended into the downcast shaft where several colliers were found alive and returned them to the surface. The coal had caught fire and buckets were sent for to extinguish it but two more explosions occurred and the explorers had to return to the surface. It was decided that anyone left underground must be dead and the shaft was sealed. Altogether 69 men died.	69
15 November 1871	Hindley Green Colliery Springs Pit	Hindley Green	Six men and eleven ponies were killed in an explosion in the Arley mine at Springs Pit after shot firing ignited gas.	6
28 March 1872	Lovers Lane Colliery	Atherton	An explosion at Fletcher's Lovers' Lane Colliery killed 27 men and boys. It was caused when gas accumulated by inadequate ventilation was ignited by the discharge of a shot of gunpowder.	27
3 June 1873	Bryn Hall Colliery	Bryn, Ashton-in-Makerfield	An explosion killed six men and severely damaged the pit.	6
21 November 1873	Mesnes Colliery Barebones Pit	Pemberton	An explosion after shot firing at the Mesnes pit killed five of the 73 men and boys who were working in the pit. About 20 were badly burned.	5
18 July 1874	Ince Hall Colliery Saw Mill Pit	Ince-in-Makerfield	The men died after an explosion of firedamp occurred after shotfiring had taken place without proper checks being made.	15
3 December 1875	Alexandra Colliery	Whelley	The Wigan Coal and Iron Company had opened the colliery about six months before an incident in the shaft led to the collision of two cages in which seven men were thrown to their deaths.	7
23 January 1877	Stonehill Colliery	Farnworth	A fire in the colliery's Cannel mine around 1,200 yards from the pit bottom filled the workings with smoke and fumes. Most men escaped but of 40 trapped by the fire 18 were asphyxiated. The fire was extinguished two days later. At the time of the disaster naked flames were used in the colliery as it was not considered to be a "gassy" pit.	18
7 February 1877	Foggs Colliery	Darcy Lever	Foggs Pit employed 50 men and boys.the workers rushed to the pit bottom after smoke filled the workings. Ten men were missing. Exploring parties were sent down but the pit was on fire and had to be blocked up. A second explosion sent flames from the shaft blowing the cage into the headgear.	10
6 March 1877	Great Boys Colliery	Tyldesley	An explosion attributed to blown out shot killed six men at the pit which was owned by Thomas Fletcher of Little Lever.	6
12 March 1877	Unity Brook Colliery	Kearsley	The colliery worked two seams, the Trencherbone mine at about 300 yards and the Cannel mine at about 360 yards. The two shafts had winding engines and the downcast was the winding shaft for both seams. Open lights were used to work both seams and safety lamps were only used for examinations. The explosion took place in the lower Cannel mine after a roof fall. Just before the explosion, the cage had just reached the pit bank when the blast blew it into fragments, some of which fell down the shaft.	43
11 October 1877	Pemberton Colliery	Pemberton	An explosion caused by a blown out shot took place at Pemberton Colliery's King Pit which was owned by Jonathan Blundell and Sons. The explosion in the Wigan Nine Foot mine killed 36 men and boys including Mr Watkin, the colliery manager. After the accident, blasting was carried out during the night.	36
17 February 1878	Whiston Colliery	Whiston	An underground explosion killed seven men.	7
7 June 1878	Haydock Collieries Wood Pit	Haydock	The Wood Pit disaster. An underground explosion in the Florida mine killed 189 men and boys.	189
22 October 1879	Alexandra Colliery	St Helens	Seven men were killed in an overwinding incident.	7

== 1880s ==
Date	Colliery	Location	Notes	Deaths
19 December 1881	Abram Colliery	Abram	An underground explosion killed 48 men.	48
2 October 1883	Nelson Pit	Shakerley	A chain snapped while six men and boys were descending the shaft at Shakerley Collieries Nelson Pit. All were killed.	6
7 November 1883	Moorfield Colliery	Accrington	An underground explosion killed 68 men and boys.	68
18 June 1885	Clifton Hall Colliery	Clifton, near Pendlebury	An explosion in the Trencherbone mine at Andrew Knowles' colliery killed 178 men and boys. A monument was erected in St Augustine's churchyard, Pendlebury where 64 victims were buried. The explosion was caused by firedamp igniting on contact with a candle.	178
13 August 1886	Bedford Colliery	Bedford, Leigh	The Bedford Colliery disaster occurred on Friday when an explosion of firedamp caused the death of 38 miners at Speakman's Bedford No.2 Pit.	38
6 April 1888	Douglas Bank Colliery	Wigan	Five men were killed in a shaft sinking accident.	5

== 1890s ==
Date	Colliery	Location	Notes	Deaths
14 December 1892	Bamfurlong Colliery	Ashton in Makerfield	An underground fire caused the deaths of 16 workers.	16
20 February 1896	Westleigh Colliery	Westleigh, Leigh	The cage containing eight men was wound the wrong way causing it to detach.	8

== 1900s ==
Date	Colliery	Location	Notes	Deaths
29 June 1900	Haydock Collieries Old Boston Pit	Haydock	An outburst of gas while shaft sinking caused eight deaths.	8
2 April 1902	Garswood Hall Colliery	Ashton-in-Makerfield	An underground explosion killed 14 men.	14
20 January 1905	Bold Colliery	St Helens	A winding accident caused five deaths.	5
16 July 1905	Haydock Collieries New Boston Pit	Haydock	Five men were killed in a roof fall.	5
4 October 1907	Foggs Colliery	Darcy Lever, Bolton	Ten men were killed in a cage collision.	10
18 August 1908	Maypole Colliery	Abram	The Maypole Colliery disaster was the result of an underground explosion. The death toll was 76.	76

== 1910s ==
Date	Colliery	Location	Notes	Deaths
21 December 1910	Hulton Bank Colliery	Over Hulton, Westhoughton	The Pretoria Pit disaster occurred when an underground explosion at the Hulton Colliery Company's No. 3 or Pretoria Pit. It killed 344 men.	344
11 December 1917	Cronton Colliery	Widnes	An explosion killed eight men.	8

== 1920s ==
Date	Colliery	Location	Notes	Deaths
4 November 1925	Pendleton Colliery	Pendleton, Salford	An upheaval in the floor in workings 2,000 feet down and 2 1/2 miles from shaft, an emission of gas and explosion killed six men.	6

== 1930s ==
Date	Colliery	Location	Notes	Deaths
26 February 1930	Haydock Collieries Lyme Pit	Haydock	An underground explosion killed five men.	5
10 October 1932	Bickershaw Colliery	Leigh	The cage carrying 20 men descended but was detached from the rope and 19 men were drowned in the sump at the bottom of the shaft.	19
7 June 1939	Astley Green Colliery	Astley	Five men including the colliery manager died while fighting a "gob" fire in the Crombouke mine after an explosion.	4

== 1950s ==
Date	Colliery	Location	Notes	Deaths
6 March 1957	Chanters Colliery	Hindsford, Atherton	An underground explosion killed eight men.	8
10 October 1959	Bickershaw Colliery	Leigh	Five men died including two members of Boothstown mines rescue team.	5

== 1960s ==
Date	Colliery	Location	Notes	Deaths
22 March 1962	Hapton Valley Colliery	Burnley	An explosion 750 feet below ground killed 19 men.	19

== 1970s ==
Date	Colliery	Location	Notes	Deaths
19 March 1979	Golborne Colliery	Golborne	An explosion, caused by the ignition of a build up of methane, at Golborne Colliery killed 10 men and seriously injured one other. A fireball shot along a tunnel which was 1,800 feet underground.	10

== See also ==
- Glossary of coal mining terminology
