= Pendlebury Colliery =

Coordinates: 53.514°N 2.325°W

Pendlebury Colliery, usually called Wheatsheaf Colliery after the adjacent public house, was a coal mine operating on the Manchester Coalfield after 1846 in Pendlebury near Manchester, then in the historic county of Lancashire, England.

The colliery, sunk in 1846, was owned by Andrew Knowles and Sons and had two ten foot diameter shafts 24 yards apart.> The colliery originally had pitch pine timber headgear and a winding engine supplied by John Musgrave & Sons of Bolton that operated until 1944. The colliery was ventilated by furnace until the 20th century when ventilation fans were installed. Wrought iron boilers to raise steam for powering pumps, air compressors and haulage were originally sited near the bottom of No.2 shaft, the upcast shaft. The shaft bottom was reached at 1,775 feet. The colliery accessed several coal seams including the Rams, Crumbouke and Doe mines. In 1896 the colliery employed 640 men underground and 165 surface workers while in 1923 there were 563 underground and 172 surface workers.

The colliery became part of Manchester Collieries in 1929 and the National Coal Board in 1947. The colliery was connected by tunnel to Newtown Colliery in 1957 but closed in June 1961.

The colliery was situated on the north-east side of Bolton Road (A666), Pendlebury between Carrington Street and City Walk on what is now the Wheatsheaf Industrial Estate.
