= Pendleton, Greater Manchester =

District of Salford, England

Coordinates: 53.4919°N 2.2819°W

Pendleton
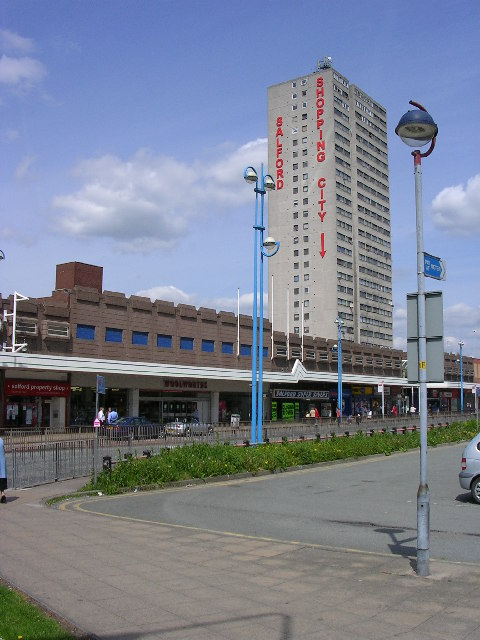
- Salford Shopping Centre, Pendleton

- Location within Greater Manchester
- OS grid reference: SJ812991
- Metropolitan borough: Salford
- Metropolitan county: Greater Manchester
- Region: North West
- Country: England
- Sovereign state: United Kingdom
- Post town: SALFORD
- Postcode district: M6
- Dialling code: 0161
- Police: Greater Manchester
- Fire: Greater Manchester
- Ambulance: North West
- UK Parliament: Salford

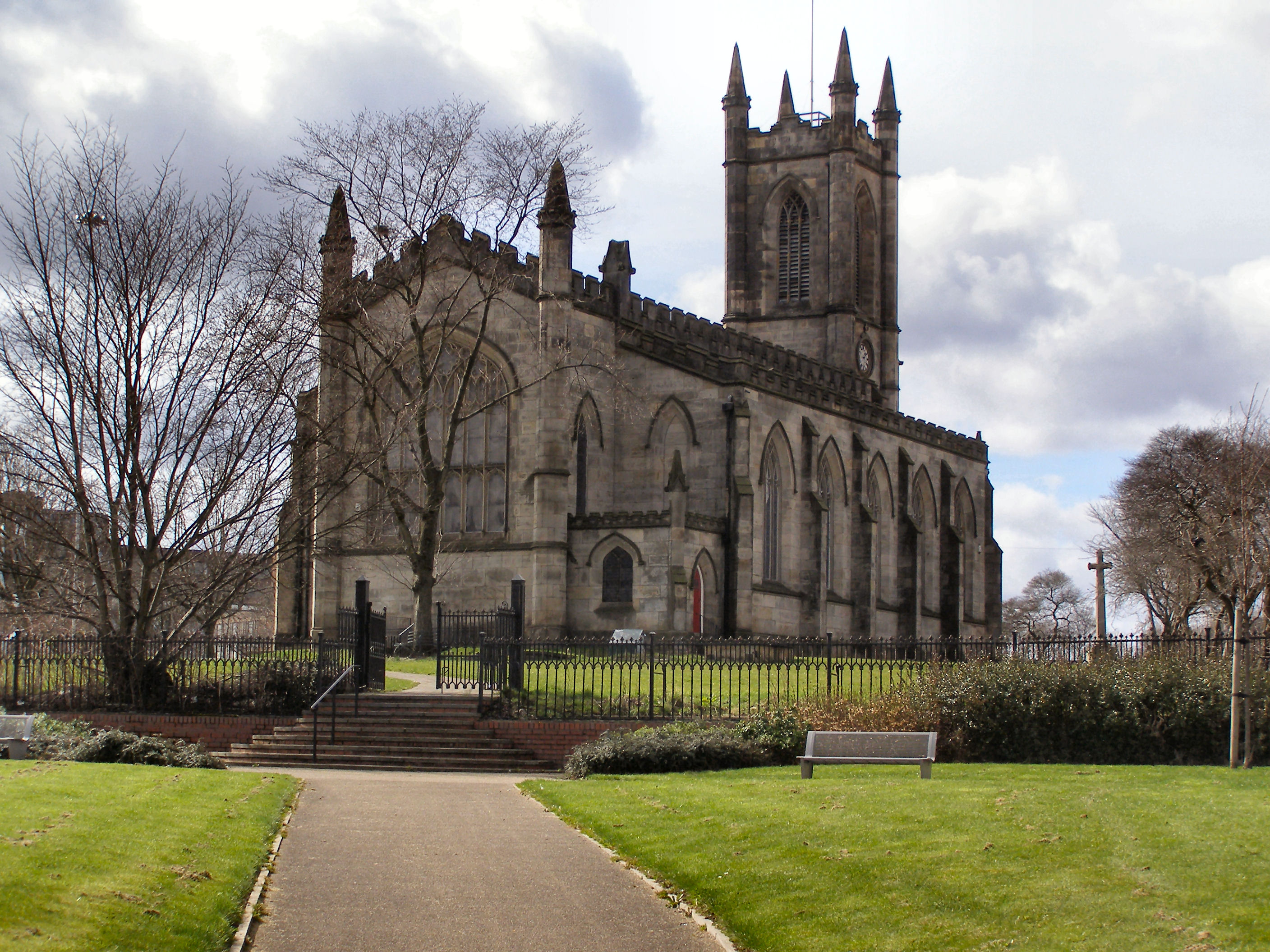
St Thomas Church, Pendleton

Pendleton is an inner-city district of Salford, Greater Manchester, England. The A6 dual carriageway skirts the east of the district. Historically in Lancashire, Pendleton experienced rapid urbanisation during the Industrial Revolution.

== History ==
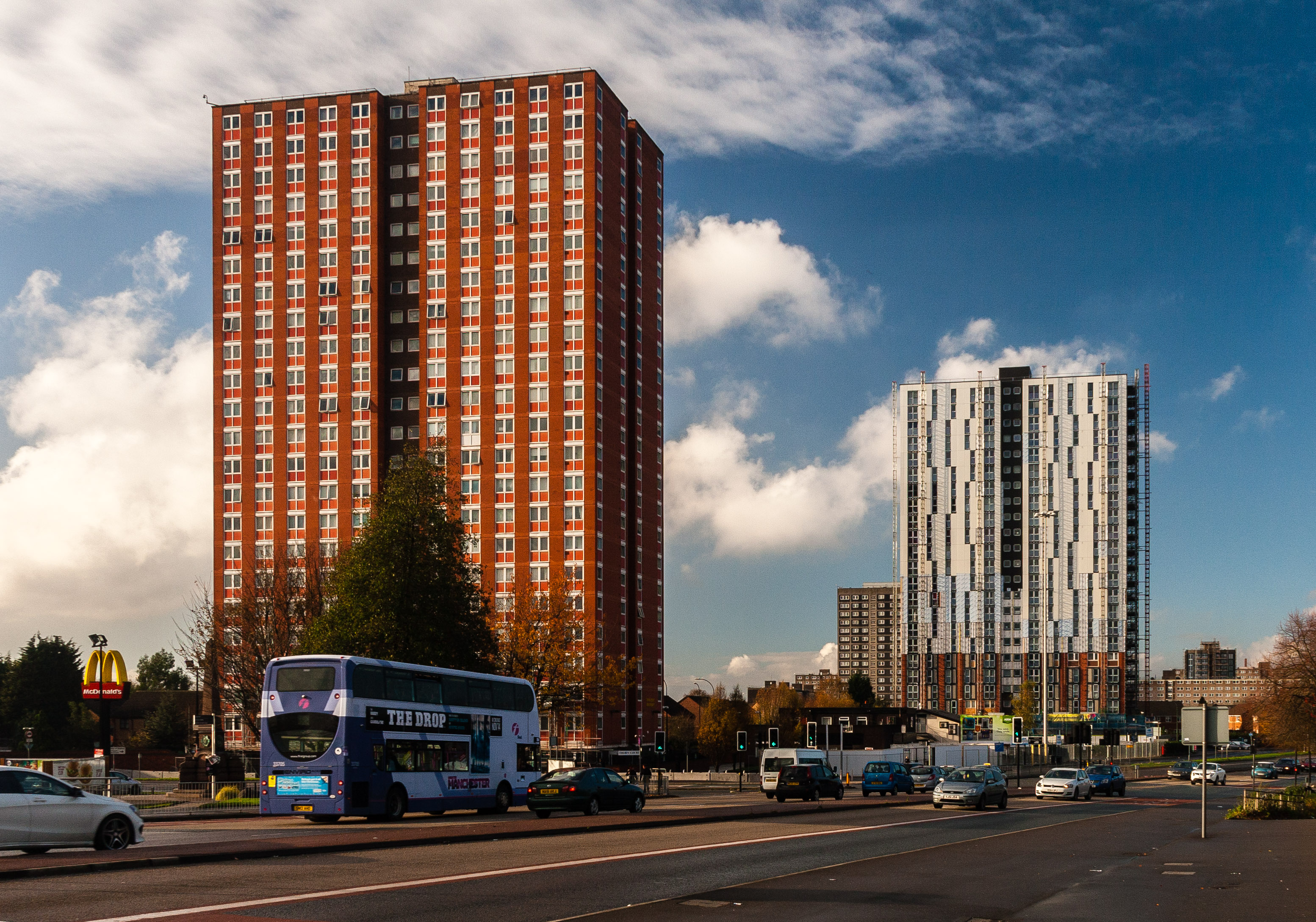
High rise flats in Pendleton

The township has been variously recorded as Penelton in 1199, Pennelton in 1212, Penilton in 1236, Penhulton in 1331, Penulton in 1356 and Pendleton from about 1600.

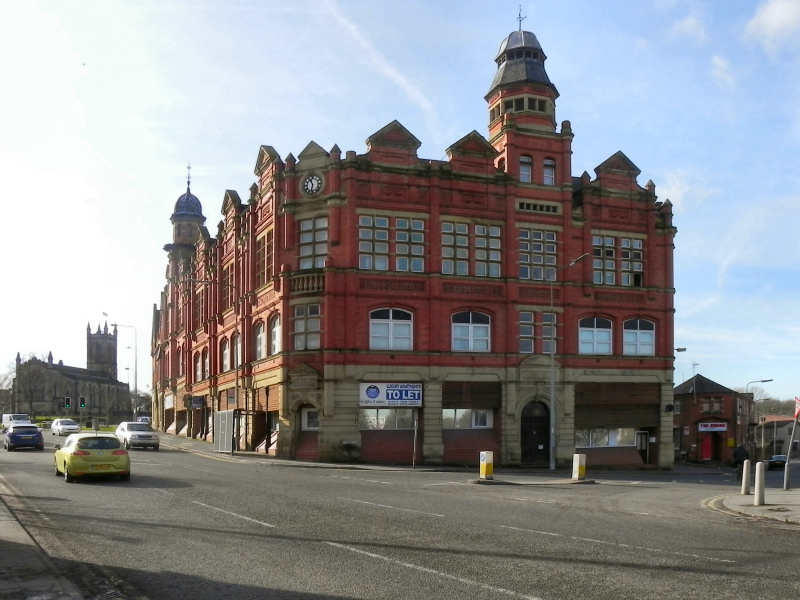
Pendleton Cooperative Building

In the Middle Ages the manor was held by the Hultons of Hulton Park.

Until 1780, Pendleton was rural, a group of cottages around a village green with a maypole. The Industrial Revolution brought about rapid expansion in the population and large cotton mills and premises for dyeing, printing, and bleaching were built providing employment. Pendleton Colliery was developed from the early 19th century.

Violence and looting occurred in Pendleton during the 2011 riots. In 2012, Salford City Council announced a £430million regeneration scheme for the area.

== Governance ==
Pendleton emerged as a township and chapelry in the ecclesiastical parish of Eccles in the hundred of Salford in the historic county of Lancashire. After 1837 Pendleton was part of the Salford Poor Law Union which took responsibility for the administration of the Poor Law and provided a workhouse.

In 1844 the neighbouring township of Salford was incorporated as a borough. However owing to opposition from Pendleton rate payers who felt that their interests would be over-ruled by Salford, it was not until 1853 that Pendleton and neighbouring Broughton who had also refused to merge with Salford became incorporated into an enlarged Borough of Salford. This was owing to increasing concerns to improve the sanitary conditions of the two townships which would have otherwise resulted in the creation of Local Boards of Health. In 1866 Pendleton became a separate civil parish. Pendleton together with Broughton became part of the County Borough of Salford from its inception in 1889, thus for the purposes of local government being independent from the jurisdictions of the newly formed Lancashire County Council. On 1 April 1919 the parish was abolished and merged with Salford. In 1911 the parish had a population of 78,783. In 1974 became part of the much enlarged metropolitan borough of the City of Salford, in the metropolitan county of Greater Manchester.

Pendleton is mostly covered by the electoral ward of Langworthy. It is represented in Westminster by Rebecca Long-Bailey, Member of Parliament (MP) for Salford.

The ward is represented on Salford City Council by three Labour councillors: John Warmisham, Michele Barnes, and Wilson Nkurunziza.

== Geography ==
Pendleton is 2 miles north west of Manchester city centre and separated by the River Irwell and at the junction of roads to Liverpool, Preston, Bolton and Manchester. The Manchester, Bolton & Bury Canal passes the area. Pendleton is on the Manchester Coalfield, part of Lancashire Coalfield. In the early days of coal mining seams lying on or close to the surface were exploited, but as time went by deeper shafts were sunk to exploit deeper coal seams, so that by the beginning of the 20th century Pendleton Colliery had the deepest shafts in Great Britain, at 3,474 feet (1,059 m).

The area gives its name to the geological feature known as the Pendleton Fault, one of four large faults running under the Manchester area. The faults are geologically active, and cause earthquake tremors that have been recorded for centuries, most recently in August 2007, when Manchester experienced six minor earthquakes.

Clarendon Park is within the bounds of Pendleton. The largest public park is Buile Hill Park which lies on high ground adjacent to Eccles Old Road.

== Transport ==
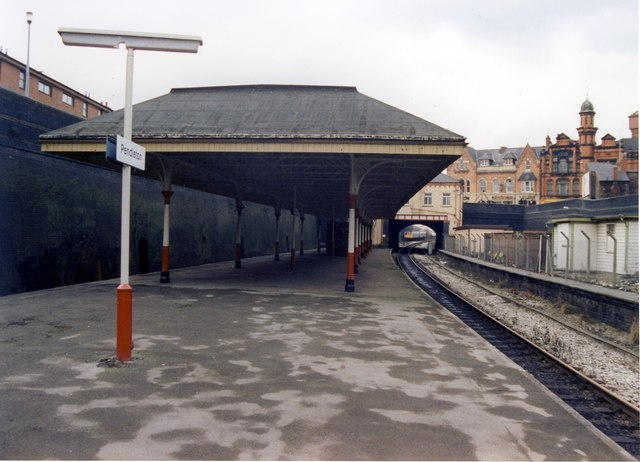
Pendleton old railway station

Pendleton railway station closed in 1998 after it was damaged in an arson attack. Salford Crescent railway station links the district and with the stations in Manchester at (Piccadilly, Oxford Road and Victoria).

== Parish church ==
St Thomas Church, a Commissioners' Church, is the parish church. It replaced the original chapel. It was built in 1829–1831 to the design of Francis Goodwin and Richard Lane in a Perpendicular Gothic Revival style with a west tower and three galleries.

== Notable people ==
The 19th century industrialist and Liberal politician Sir Elkanah Armitage lived at Hope Hall from 1853 until his death in 1876. The cartographer, printer and publisher George Bradshaw was born in 1801 and James Agate (1877–1947) the theatre critic was also born here.

Tommy White (1908–1967), an Everton and England footballer, was born in Pendleton, as was the sociologist and anti-women's ordination activist Margaret Hewitt (1928–1991). Pat Kirkwood (1921–2007), who became one a stars of musical theatre, was born in Pendleton. The actors Albert Finney (1936–2019), born in the Charlestown area and baptised at St George's Church, Charlestown, and Christopher Eccleston (born 1964) was brought up in Langworthy.

Peter Hook of the bands Joy Division and New Order grew up in the area. He once said "All my friends moved to Ellor Street, which was all high-rise 70's flats and a new shopping precinct all built out of concrete. It was rotten, horrible; like a concrete wasteland. And that was when it opened."

== See also ==
- Listed buildings in Salford, Greater Manchester
- List of mining disasters in Lancashire
