= Salford Shopping Centre =

Shopping centre in Salford, Greater Manchester, England

Coordinates: 53.4891°N 2.2873°W

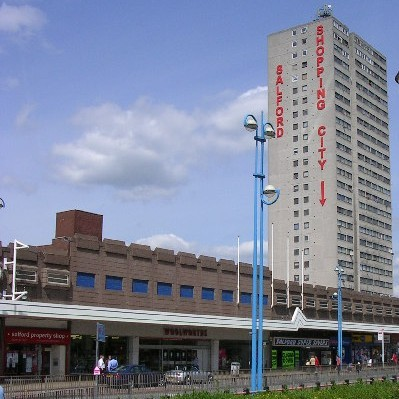
- Salford Shopping Centre looking over Hankinson Way, 2005
- Location: Pendleton, Salford, Greater Manchester, England
- Opened: 1972; 54 years ago
- Previous names: Salford Shopping City
- Owner: Salford Estates (under Praxis Holdings)
- Num. of stores: 81
- Num. of anchor tenants: 2
- Public transit: Bus: multiple stops and providers Routes: 8, 10, 34, 34A, 35, 36, 37, 38, 50, 52, 53 67, 67A, 70, 74, 75, 79, 95, 100
- Website: www.salfordshoppingcentre.com

Salford Shopping Centre (locally known as Salford Precinct and formerly named Salford Shopping City) is a shopping centre located in Salford, Greater Manchester, England. Built in 1972 in the Pendleton district of Salford, the shopping centre has been the subject of numerous redevelopment projects undertaken by Salford City Council. The centre has 81 indoor shopping units and an indoor market complex which sells a wide range of goods.

== History ==
=== Slum clearances ===
The site of Salford Shopping Centre was previously a residential area. In 1952, Salford City Council published a 20-year development plan for Salford which noted, as well as poor housing conditions, the lack of a central focal point in the city. It laid out plans for intensified slum clearances for redevelopment, in line with national post-WWII trends. Demolitions began soon after. The plan for Salford was approved in 1957, with the site of the current shopping centre falling into its largest clearance area, the Broad Street Ellor Street Comprehensive Development Area.

=== Plans for site ===
In 1961, with clearances already in progress, Salford City Council began working with Sir Robert Matthew on the Ellor Street redevelopment plan, chaired by councillor Albert Jones. The planning proposal was published in 1962. Urban designer and plan co-author Percy Johnson-Marshall stated that his task was to construct a new city centre after the clearances.

The proposal for the 89-acre (36 ha) site within the development area consisted of four main elements: high-density housing, a shopping centre, a civic and administration centre, and education and health and social care facilities. The civic centre was to directly adjoin the shopping centre and comprise a town hall, art gallery, museum, central library, swimming pool and dance hall.

The shopping centre was to replace 120 shops to be demolished under the development plan, as well as a further 147 shops that would be lost to A6 road improvements. The site was to house roads and 2,000 parking spaces at ground level, with shops and amenities above, incorporating the slope of the land and allowing access via pedestrian walkways from the new housing blocks. It would incorporate 260 shops, a market, a hotel, and offices. The project was to cost £5.25 million.

The plan proposed the demolition of 6,000 terraced houses over a 300-acre (120 ha) site in the Hanky Park (Hankinson Street) and Ellor Street areas of Pendleton.

=== Construction ===
Construction took place from 1962 to 1970. Due to a lack of funds and a political scandal which saw chairman Albert Jones jailed for eight months in 1965, construction was halted.

The finished site had only 95 shop units compared to the proposed 260, the hotel and two storey car park were never built. On 21 May 1970 the new Salford Market officially opened. From 1971 onwards shops inside the precinct began to open, the first of these being Tesco.

=== After opening ===
In 1991, the building was refurbished at a cost of £4 million, this included the installation of roofs across various walkways, making large swathes of the centre undercover. The shopping centre which at the time was known as "Salford Precinct" was renamed "Salford Shopping City."

On 9 August 1994, the Manchester Evening News reported that Salford City Council was planning on selling off Salford Shopping City to raise money for local regeneration, these plans split the ruling Labour Party council, with one councillor telling the press that it would be like "selling off the family silver."

In 2000, Salford Shopping City was eventually sold to a private company for £10 million in an effort to cut the council's deficit. It was then later sold in March 2010 to Praxis Holdings for £40 million. The company stated that it wanted to invest in the precinct and link it to the new superstore.

== 2011 Salford riots ==
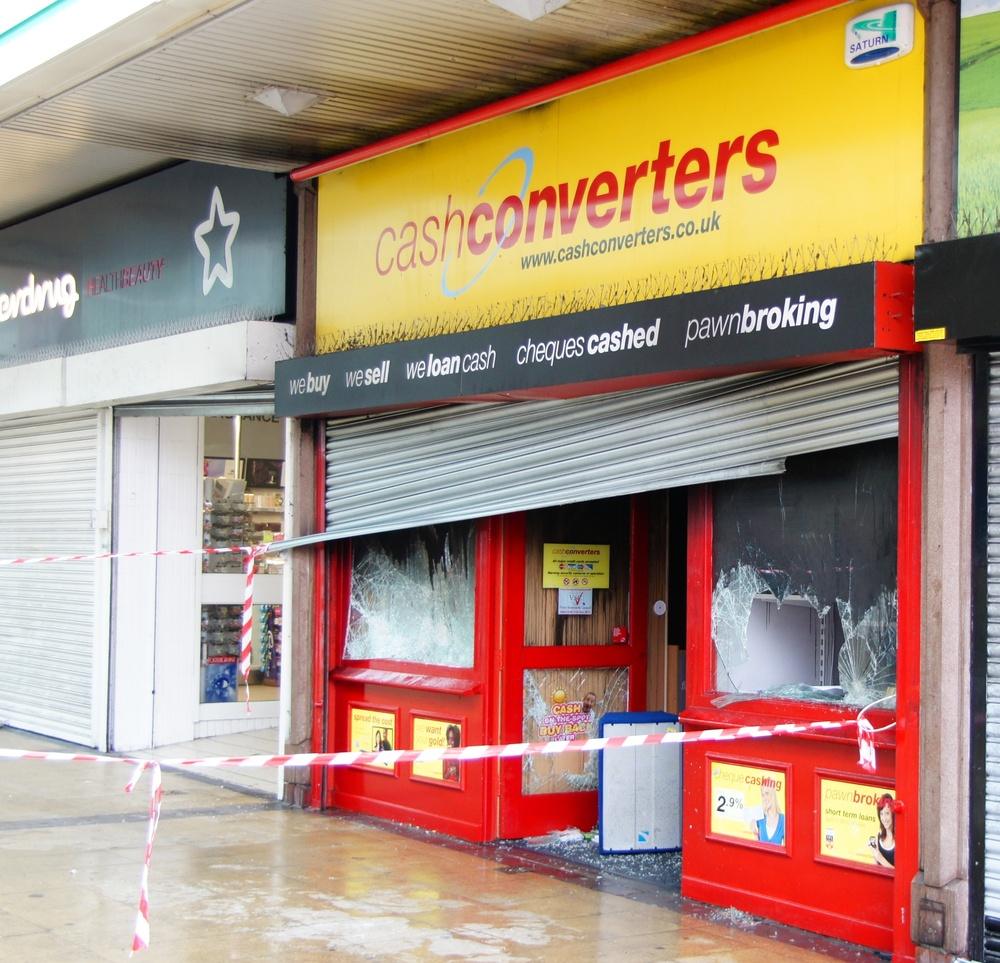
Damage to Cash Converters after the Salford riots, 10 August 2011.

On 9 August 2011, a minority of people from Salford and its surrounding Manchester areas attacked several retail outlets at Salford Shopping City, as part of the larger scale riots experienced in England that summer.

Although shops on the inside of the centre remained largely untouched, outlets on Hankinson Way and Pendleton Way were heavily damaged, one of the worst affected was Timpsons and Cash Converters, these outlets were both looted and set ablaze by rioters. Images of rioters breaking into several outlets on Hankinson Way including the Money Shop and Bargain Booze were broadcast on both local and national news programmes that day.

Several reasons have been put forward for the events that took place at Salford Shopping City that day, they include poor relations with the local authority and poor living conditions in the surrounding areas, including Clarendon, which at the time of the incident had the highest child poverty rates in Salford at 75%. However, Prime Minister David Cameron dismissed these claims, stating that the rioters were merely "opportunistic thugs" in a statement to the House of Commons.

== Tesco controversy ==
In October 2010, Salford City Council gave the go ahead for a new £45 million Tesco superstore to be built on Pendleton Way opposite the site of Salford Shopping City. The plan involved the demolition of St James's R.C. primary school which had stood on the site since the early 1900s, the demolition of Emmanuel Church which was to be later rebuilt on Langworthy Road and the permanent closure of Pendleton Way.

The proposal was met with fierce opposition from both Salford Estates (owners of Salford Shopping City) who had purchased the site for £40 million in March 2010 and local residents. Gareth Edmunds of Salford Estates claimed that "traders can't compete with a Tesco of that size" and it would "destroy Salford Shopping City." On 21 October 2010, Salford Estates launched judicial review proceedings against Salford City Council over the sale of the land to Tesco and presented them with a petition with over 8,000 signatures from local traders and residents rejecting the proposal.

Despite this construction commenced in early 2012, the store was designed by Smith Smalley Architects and constructed by Patton Construction. The store opened on 15 November 2012. Tesco claimed the 24-hour store would create over 600 new jobs with at least half of them going to locally unemployed people.

== Future development ==
Salford Estates have promised to continue to develop the site. In late 2012, the original market which had stood since 1970 was removed and replaced with three units. One of the units is a 15,900 sq ft (1,480 m^{2}) supermarket, occupied by Aldi and opened in January 2014, which created over 80 jobs. Two further 5,000 sq ft (460 m^{2}) non-food units have not yet been pre-let.

In November 2013, a 2,661 sq ft (247.2 m^{2}) KFC opened, creating 40 new jobs.

Development was planned to continue through 2014 and beyond, including over 90,000 sq ft (8,400 m^{2}) of additional retail space split into two extensions of 13 double height shop units. As of 2021, this work has not commenced, with no plans to begin works.

In 2020, the bus stops and Hankinson Way were redeveloped as part of the Salford Bolton Network Improvements package.
