= Listed buildings in Swinton and Pendlebury =

Swinton and Pendlebury is a town (and former borough) in the City of Salford Metropolitan Borough, Greater Manchester, England. It contains 23 listed buildings that are recorded in the National Heritage List for England. Of these, one is listed at Grade I, the highest of the three grades, one is at Grade II*, the middle grade, and the others are at Grade II, the lowest grade. The listed buildings include houses, churches and items in churchyards, a public house, aqueducts, a railway viaduct, cemetery buildings, a bandstand and war memorials.

== Key ==
Grade	Criteria
I	Buildings of exceptional interest, sometimes considered to be internationally important
II*	Particularly important buildings of more than special interest
II	Buildings of national importance and special interest

== Buildings ==
Name and location	Photograph	Date	Notes	Grade
Sindsley House; 53.50304°N 2.36005°W	—	1715	A brick house with a stone-slate roof that was altered and expanded in the early 19th century. It has two storeys and three bays with extension on both sides. There is a gabled 19th-century left wing and a gabled 19th-century porch. The windows are mullioned or mullioned and transomed, and contains casements. On the left return are 19th century canted bay windows.	II
101 Moorside Road; 53.50830°N 2.35673°W	—	Mid-18th century	A brick house with a stone-slate roof, it has two storeys, two bays, and a rear lean-to extension. Above the door is a 19th-century gabled canopy, and the windows are casements.	II
Moorfield Cottage; 53.50535°N 2.35464°W	—	Mid-18th century	A brick house with a stone-slate roof, two storeys and four bays, the left two bays recessed. The doorway has an elliptical-arched head, and the windows are casements.	II
White Horse public house 53.50308°N 2.35924°W		Mid to late 18th century	The public house, which was partly rebuilt in the 20th century, is in brick with a dentilled eaves cornice and a slate roof. It has an L-shaped plan, with four two-storey bays to the left, a three-storey gabled wing at the right with two bays on the front and two on the side, and lean-to extensions at the rear. On the front is a gabled porch and a Tudor arched doorway, and the windows are sashes. On the side the windows have cambered heads with keystones and contain sash or casement windows.	II
Wainwright's Farmhouse; 53.50283°N 2.34568°W	—	Late 18th century	A farmhouse, later a private house that was later altered and extended, it is in brick with a slate roof. The house has an irregular plan, with two and three storeys, and six bays. There is a 20th-century porch, and the windows are 20th-century replacement casements.	II
Clifton Aqueduct; 53.52736°N 2.31683°W		1796	The aqueduct carried the Manchester, Bolton and Bury Canal (now disused) over the River Irwell. It is in stone with brick arches, and consists of three segmental arches with keystones, pilasters, and triangular cutwaters. On the east side is a brick parapet.	II
119 Station Road; 53.51705°N 2.33570°W	—	c. 1835	A brick house with a sill band, a wooden eaves cornice and a slate roof. It has two storeys, five bays, a single-storey recessed right wing and a wing at the rear. Steps lead up to a segmental-headed doorway with engaged Tuscan columns and a fanlight and the windows are sashes.	II
St John the Evangelist's Church, Pendlebury; 53.50361°N 2.30983°W		1842	The chancel was added in 1854 and the baptistry in 1882. The church is in stone with a slate roof, and is in Neo-Romanesque style. It consists of a nave, north and south porches, a chancel, and a west tower with a baptistry to the south. The tower has three stages, angled buttresses, a round-arched door, and clock faces. In the top stage are tall round-arched bell openings, and the tower is surmounted by a pyramidal roof. The baptistry is semicircular with a conical roof, the south porch is embattled, and the north porch has a coped gable. On the corners of the nave are piers with pyramidal roofs rising above the parapet.	II
Clifton Railway Viaduct; 53.52703°N 2.31465°W		1848	The viaduct was built by the Lancashire and Yorkshire Railway to carry the line over the River Irwell and the Manchester, Bolton and Bury Canal. It is in stone, with a curved plan, and has 18 segmental arches carried on tapering piers with impost bands. The viaduct has a coped parapet over a continuous band and there are piers at the ends.	II
Christ Church, Pendlebury; 53.51621°N 2.33027°W		1856–1859	The church was designed by W. R. Corson in Gothic Revival style, and the steeple was added in 1861 by G. F. Bodley. The church is in stone with a slate roof, and consists of a wide nave, a small chancel, and a northwest steeple incorporating a porch. The steeple has a four-stage tower with buttresses, and is surmounted by a saddleback roof. On the roof of the nave are dormers and vents.	II
St Peter's Church, Swinton; 53.51193°N 2.34143°W		1869	The church was designed by G. E. Street in Gothic Revival style, it is in stone, and has a roof of green, blue and grey slates in diamond patterns, and coped gables with cross finials. The church consists of a nave, north and south aisles, a chancel with side chapels and a vestry, and a west tower. The tower has three stages, an octagonal stair turret with grotesque heads, clock faces, and an embattled parapet with corner pinnacles.	II*
St Augustine's Church, Pendlebury; 53.51068°N 2.32233°W		1870–1874	The church, designed by Bodley and Garner in free Gothic style, is built in brick with stone dressings and a clay tile roof. It consists of a nave and chancel under one roof, north and south passage-aisles, a south porch, and a north vestry. The church is built on a raft of concrete to prevent subsidence, and has a projecting plinth, and buttresses that rise above the parapet and have gablets. At the east end is a seven-light window, angled buttresses with statue niches and crocketed pinnacles.	I
St Anne's Church; 53.52783°N 2.33915°W		1872–1874	The church was designed by E. M. Barry in High Victorian Gothic style, and has a cruciform plan. It is in yellow sandstone with freestone dressings, and has a red tiled roof with cockscomb ridge tiles. The church consists of a nave with a clerestory, north and south aisles, a gabled south porch, north and south transepts, a chancel with aisles and an apsidal east end, and a gabled north vestry. On the east gable of the nave is a bellcote and there are rose windows in the west wall and in the fronts of the transepts.	II
St Augustine's Gatehouse; 53.51156°N 2.32132°W	—	c. 1874	The gatehouse to St Augustine's Church and former school was designed by G. F. Bodley in free Gothic style. It is in brick with dressings and bands in ashlar stone, and has a clay tile roof with coped gables. There are two storeys, two bays, and a small rear wing. In the left bay is an archway above which is a carved coat of arms, and in the right bay and upper floor are three casement windows.	II
The Environmental Institute; 53.51116°N 2.32142°W	—	c. 1874	Originally St Augustine's School, it was designed by G. F. Bodley in free Gothic style, and later converted for use as offices. The building is in brick with dressings in stone, and has a clay tile roof with coped gables. There are eight bays, the outer bay projecting as gabled wings. The windows are mullioned and transomed with a continuous hood mould. On the roof are roof lights, and on the ridge is a cupola bellcote.	II
117 Station Road; 53.51694°N 2.33583°W	—	c. 1890	A brick house at the end of a terrace, it is on a projecting plinth, and has a band, decorative brick in the eaves, stone dressings and a slate roof. There is a double-depth plan, two storeys and an attic, and two bays. In the left bay is a recessed porch, to the right is a two-storey canted bay window, and on the roof is a gabled dormer. All the windows have been altered. The house was the home of the painter L. S. Lowry.	II
Thirlmere Aqueduct; 53.51472°N 2.29282°W		1892	The aqueduct carries two pipes with water from Thirlmere to Manchester over the River Irwell. It has three cast iron arches with gritstone piers and abutments. There is much decorative ironwork.	II
Band Stand; 53.50857°N 2.32610°W		1897	The bandstand was erected in Victoria Park to commemorate the Diamond Jubilee of Queen Victoria. It has a brick plinth, and eight cast iron columns support an octagonal canopy with a slate roof. Between the columns are wrought iron railings, and at the top of the columns are brackets with acanthus decoration. The roof has two stages, the upper stage being swept, and between the stages is a pierced vent.	II
Former Chapel, Agecroft Cemetery; 53.51008°N 2.29284°W		1903	The disused mortuary chapel is in stone with dressings in red sandstone and a clay tile roof. It is in free Gothic style with Arts and Crafts features. The chapel consists of a nave, a north porch, a south porte-cochère, and a large west tower. The tower has four stages, a square stair turret, mullioned and transomed windows with hood moulds, clock faces, and a timber top stage set back behind a parapet with gables and pierced panels. The porte-cochère has an embattled parapet.	II
Gateway, lodge and office, Agecroft Cemetery; 53.50998°N 2.29401°W		1903	The structures are in stone with clay tile roofs. The gateway has a vehicular entrance and two pedestrian entrances, all with pointed arches, blind arcading, and a carved lion and unicorn with a conical finial. To the right is a two-storey lodge with two gabled bays, the upper floor jettied with applied timber framing and pierced bargeboards. There is one mullioned and transomed window, the other windows being casements. To the left of the gateway is the single-storey four-bay office that has a bay window with a six-light mullioned and transomed window and an embattled parapet.	II
Clifton War Memorial; 53.52587°N 2.33636°W		c. 1919	The war memorial was designed by Gordon Forsyth. It is in ashlar stone, and consists of a tall tapering square plinth with a base and a capital. Lying on the plinth is a roaring lion, and on side of the plinth is an inscription.	II
Swinton War Memorial; 53.50739°N 2.35561°W	—	c. 1919	The war memorial stands in the grounds of Holy Rood Church. It is in granite, and consists of a Celtic cross on a tall square plinth on a low flagged platform. On the cross are Celtic knot pattern motifs and bosses. There are inscriptions on the plinth and the names of those lost in the two World Wars.	II
Lych gate 53.51217°N 2.34066°W		c. 1920	The lych gate was built at the entrance to the churchyard of St Peter's Church as a war memorial. It is in ashlar stone with a slate roof, and is in Gothic Revival style. The lych gate has entrances with moulded pointed arches flanked by buttresses containing statues in niches, and on both sides are five-light windows. Above the entrances are gables containing carvings, and on the inside walls are the names of those lost in the war.	II
