= Church of St Peter, Swinton =

Listed church in Greater Manchester, England

- St Peter's Church, Swinton
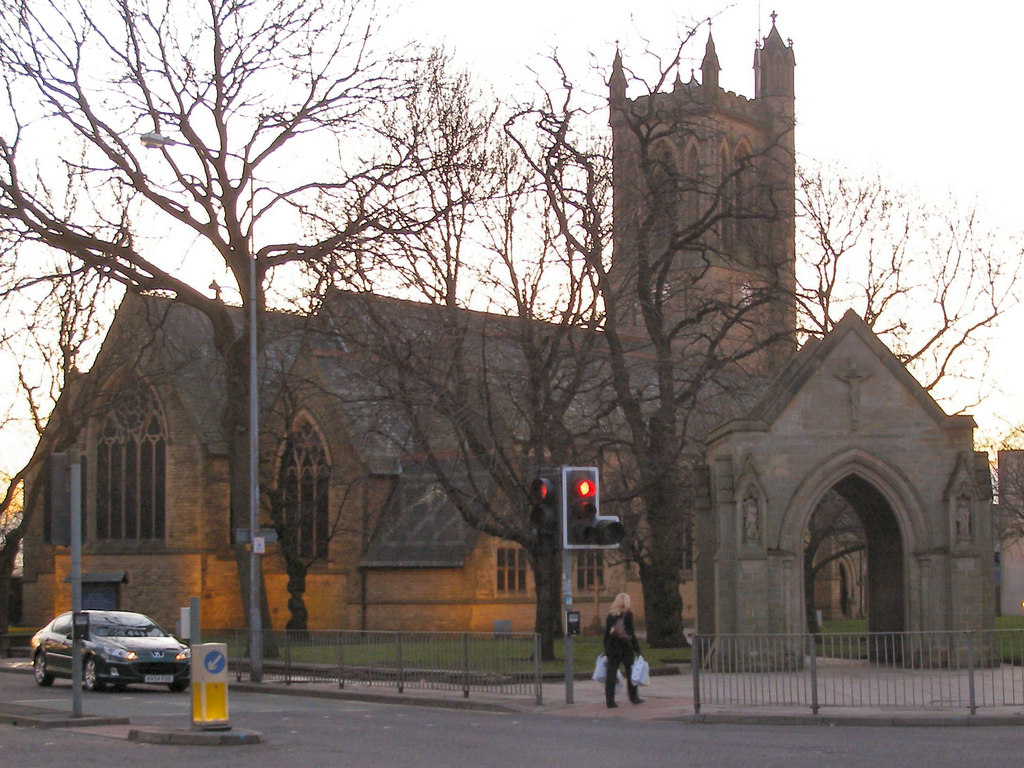
- The church in 2010

- Location in Greater Manchester
- 53.5119°N 2.3414°W
- OS grid reference: SD 77455 01745
- Address: Chorley Road, Swinton, Greater Manchester
- Country: England
- Denomination: Anglican
- Website: St Peter's

History
- Dedication: St Peter
- Consecrated: 2 October 1869; 156 years ago

Architecture
- Heritage designation: Grade II*
- Designated: 30 March 1966
- Architect: G. E. Street
- Architectural type: Church
- Style: Gothic Revival
- Years built: 1868–69

Specifications
- Materials: Rock-faced stone, slate

Administration
- Province: York
- Diocese: Manchester
- Archdeaconry: Salford
- Deanery: Salford and Leigh
- Parish: Swinton and Pendlebury

Clergy
- Priest: Rev. Dr Jeremy Sheehy

The Church of St Peter is an Anglican parish church on Chorley Road in Swinton, a town in the City of Salford, Greater Manchester, England. Serving the historic parish of Swinton and Pendlebury, it forms part of the ecclesiastical deanery of Eccles in the Diocese of Manchester. The present building was erected between 1868 and 1869 to accommodate the area's rapidly expanding industrial population and to replace an earlier chapel of ease. Designed by the architect G. E. Street in the Gothic Revival style, it is recorded in the National Heritage List for England as a Grade II* listed building.

== History ==
An earlier chapel of ease dedicated to St Peter existed in Swinton by the 18th century, serving a growing population linked to the district's developing textile and mining industries. As Swinton and neighbouring Pendlebury expanded rapidly during the 19th century, the original building proved inadequate for the needs of the parish. In response, plans were made for a new and substantially larger church on a more prominent site along Chorley Road.

The present church was commissioned in the 1860s and designed by the Victorian architect G. E. Street, one of the leading figures of the Gothic Revival. Construction began in 1868, and the building was consecrated on 2 October 1869 by James Prince Lee, the first bishop of Manchester. Work on the tower remained incomplete, however, with the top stone laid on 13 April 1870 and the scaffolding removed on 30 June 1870. Street also designed the church wall at Swinton, built in 1881.

Throughout the late 19th and early 20th centuries, the church became a focal point for civic and religious life in Swinton. Additions and alterations were made to accommodate the expanding parish, including the installation of new fittings, stained glass, and memorials commemorating local individuals and events. On 30 March 1966, the Church of St Peter was designated a Grade II* listed building.

Today, the church is well used for baptisms, marriages, funerals, and other occasional services and pastoral offices. The parish has remained in the Tractarian, high church, or Catholic tradition of the Church of England since its foundation.

== Architecture ==
The church is constructed in rock‑faced stone with a roof of slate and comprises a nave, aisles, chancel, and west tower, with side chapels and vestries.

The five‑bay nave has weathered buttresses and a plinth. Each bay incorporates a three‑light window with tracery and a continuous sill band, all positioned underneath a blind arch. The aisles have pitched roofs and there is no clerestory. The chancel, containing a five‑light east window, is flanked by gabled side chapels with three‑light windows. To the north is a double‑gabled vestry with transverse roofs. The roofs are steeply pitched and display diamond patterns in blue, green, and grey slates, and the gables are coped and finished with cross finials.

The three‑stage tower includes a corner octagonal stair turret that rises above the castellated parapet as a gableted pinnacle, and the lower stage displays grotesque heads. The west elevation contains a four‑light window beneath clock faces, while the belfry has two‑light openings flanked by blind recesses. Corner pinnacles complete the composition.

=== Interior ===
Internally, the double‑chamfered nave arcade is carried on clustered columns with naturalistic capitals carved by Thomas Earp. The nave is covered by a rafter roof, while the chancel has a barrel roof. The two‑bay chancel is divided from the side chapels by wrought‑iron screens. The reredos and chancel contain polychromatic inlaid masonry panelling, along with Minton floor tiles, a piscina, and a sedilia.

The font and pulpit are in stone with fleuron‑motif enrichment, and the font has an unusual cast-iron cover. An organ chamber, timber pews, and stalls are present. A stone at the base of the tower records the death of the architect in 1881. Stained glass windows by both Charles Eamer Kempe and Morris & Co. are also installed.

== Associated lychgate ==
A lychgate constructed around 1920 serves as the site's First World War memorial and is separately listed at Grade II. Built of ashlar masonry and roofed in slate, it is designed in the Gothic Revival style. The structure features pointed arches with moulded detailing, along with angled corner buttresses containing statues set within cusped niches. Each side is fitted with a five‑light window with cusped tracery. The front and rear gables carry a crucifix and a statue beneath a cusped canopy respectively, accompanied by inscriptions from both the Old and New Testaments. Inside, the masonry bears carved rolls of honour commemorating the fallen.

== See also ==
- Grade II* listed buildings in Greater Manchester
- Listed buildings in Swinton and Pendlebury
