= White Horse, Swinton =

Listed pub in Greater Manchester, England

White Horse
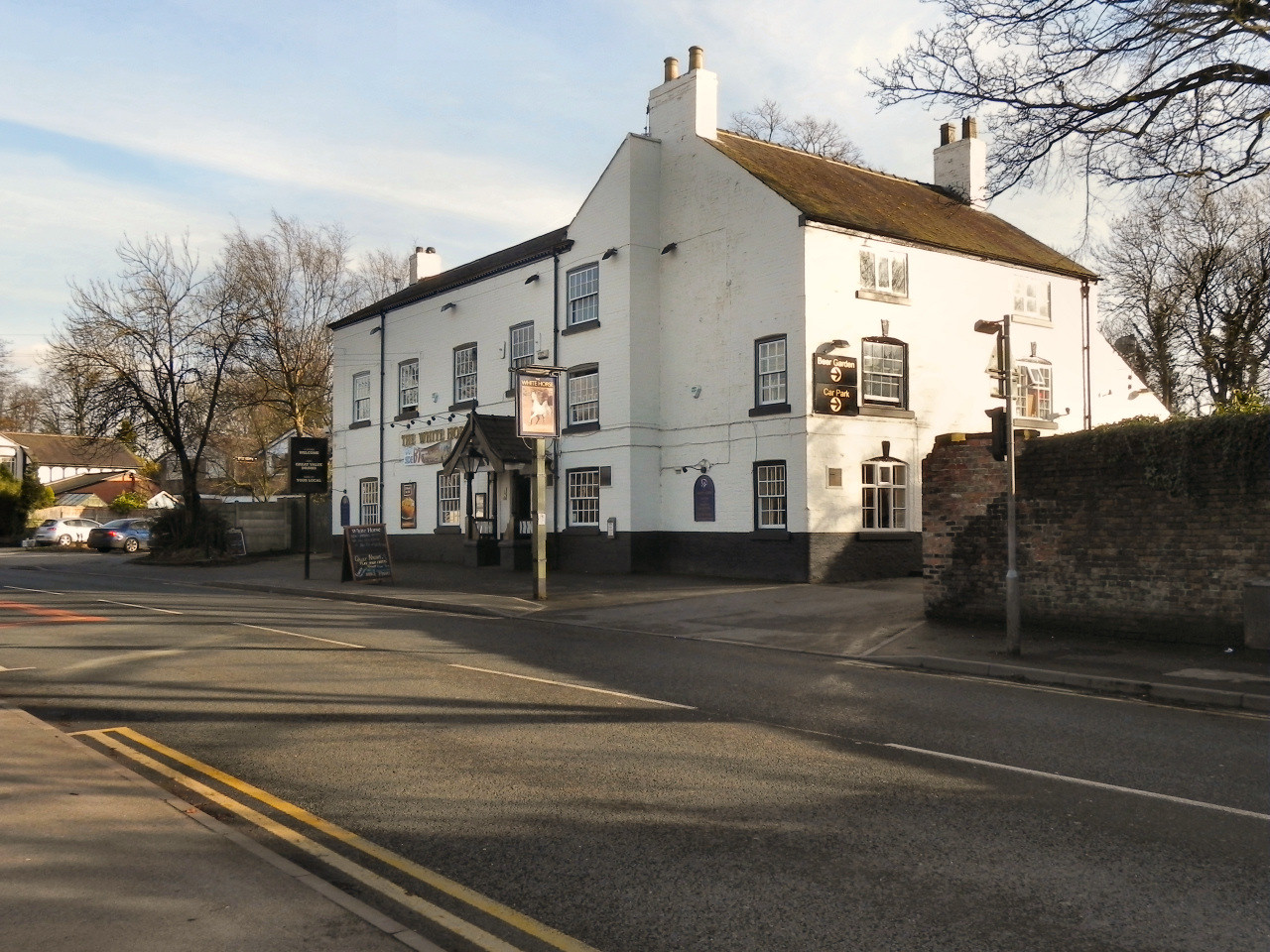
- The pub in 2011

- Location within Greater Manchester
- Former names: White Horse Hotel; White Horse Inn

General information
- Type: Public house
- Location: 384 Worsley Road, Swinton, Greater Manchester, England
- Coordinates: 53.5030°N 2.3592°W
- Year built: Mid to late 18th century
- Renovated: 20th century (partly rebuilt)
- Owner: Greene King

Design and construction
- Designations

Listed Building – Grade II
- Official name: White Horse public house
- Designated: 30 March 1966
- Reference no.: 1067480

Website
- Official website

The White Horse is a Grade II listed public house on Worsley Road in Swinton, a town in the City of Salford, England. Built in the mid to late 18th century and partly rebuilt in the 20th century, it is regarded by the Campaign for Real Ale (CAMRA) as the oldest pub in Swinton. The building was at one time a Boddington's house. As of May 2025, the freehold was owned by Greene King.

== History ==
The building was constructed in the mid to late 18th century, and was partly rebuilt in the 20th century, according to its official listing. The Campaign for Real Ale (CAMRA) regards it as Swinton's oldest public house. The 1908 Ordnance Survey map marks the building as the White Horse Inn, while the 1929 edition records it as the White Horse Inn public house.

On 30 March 1966, the White Horse was designated a Grade II listed building. CAMRA records that the building was once a Boddington's house, but provides no information on when it entered or left the brewery's estate. As of May 2025, the freehold was owned by Greene King.

== Architecture ==
The building is constructed in English garden wall bond brick with a slate roof and is arranged in an L‑shaped layout. It has six bays along one side and two along the other, with parts rising two storeys and others three. The main entrance is set within a Tudor arch and is sheltered by a 20th‑century gabled porch in the fourth bay. There are 11 flush‑fitting sash windows with either 12 or 16 panes, each set on stone sills and topped with shallow arched brick heads. A dentilled cornice runs beneath the eaves.

The first five bays appear to have been reconstructed during the 20th century. Bays five and six form the gabled end, which connects to a three‑storey wing set at right angles. This wing has two bays on its side elevation, each floor containing two windows with arched brick heads, keystones, stone sills, and either casement or sash frames. At the rear are three‑light casement windows and several lean‑to extensions. The roofline includes both ridge and gable chimney stacks. The interior has been extensively altered.

== See also ==
- Listed buildings in Swinton and Pendlebury
- Listed pubs in Greater Manchester
