= 1973 Salford City Council election =

Local election in Salford

- 10 May 1973

66 of 66 seats on Salford City Council 34 seats needed for a majority
	First party	Second party	Third party
Leader	Leslie Hough	John Hardaway	Ernest Holt
Party	Labour	Conservative	Liberal
Leader's seat	Charlestown-St. Thomas'	Eccles-Monton and Park-Patricroft	Central-Linnyshaw
Seats won	50	15	1
Popular vote	97,191	58,685	16,646
Percentage	55.5%	33.5%	9.5%
- Map of results of 1973 election
Leader of the Council before election
Labour
Leader of the Council after election
Leslie Hough
Labour

Elections to Salford City Council were held on Thursday, 10 May 1973. This was a new council created to replace Salford City Council, the municipal boroughs of Eccles and Swinton and Pendlebury, and the urban districts of Irlam and Worsley. This election would create the entire 66-member council, which would shadow its predecessor councils before taking over their functions on 1 April 1974, as specified in the Local Government Act 1972. Each 1st-placed candidate would serve a five-year term of office, expiring in 1978. Each 2nd-placed candidate would serve a three-year term of office, expiring in 1976. Each 3rd-placed candidate would serve a two-year term of office, expiring in 1975.

The Labour Party won overall control of the council.

== Election result ==
Party	Votes	Seats	
Labour Party	97,191 (55.5%)	50 (75.8%)	50 / 66
Conservative Party	58,685 (33.5%)	15 (22.7%)	15 / 66
Liberal Party	16,646 (9.5%)	1 (1.5%)	1 / 66
Communist Party	1,989 (1.1%)	0 (0.0%)	0 / 66
Independent	705 (0.4%)	0 (0.0%)	0 / 66

↓
50	1	15

== Ward results ==
=== No.1 (Eccles: Eccles-Monton and Park-Patricroft) ===
Eccles: Eccles-Monton and Park-Patricroft
Party	Candidate	Votes	%	±%
Conservative	T. Francis	2,151	52.7	
Conservative	J. Hardaway	2,035	49.8	
Conservative	W. Holmes	2,001	49.0	
Labour	N. Walcock	1,781	43.6	
Labour	C. Johnson	1,749	42.8	
Labour	R. Carter	1,707	41.8	
Communist	H. Cottam	149	3.6	
Majority		220	5.4	
Turnout		4,085	42.0	
Conservative win (new seat)				
Conservative win (new seat)				
Conservative win (new seat)				

=== No.2 (Eccles: Barton-Trafford-Irwell) ===
Eccles: Barton-Trafford-Irwell
Party	Candidate	Votes	%	±%
Labour	G. Edwards	1,800	54.6	
Labour	N. Chilton	1,604	48.7	
Labour	A. Walsh	1,580	48.0	
Liberal	A. Cooper	1,385	42.0	
Liberal	J. Woodrow	1,188	36.1	
Liberal	J. Spreet	1,092	33.2	
Communist	H. Harwood	108	3.3	
Majority		195	6.0	
Turnout		3,294	37.6	
Labour win (new seat)				
Labour win (new seat)				
Labour win (new seat)				

=== No.3 (Eccles: Westwood Park-Winton) ===
Eccles: Westwood Park-Winton
Party	Candidate	Votes	%	±%
Labour	D. Dow	2,201	67.0	
Labour	J. Burrows	2,126	64.7	
Labour	D. Lancaster	2,118	64.4	
Conservative	M. France	951	28.9	
Conservative	R. Sanderson	916	27.9	
Communist	C. Peach	131	4.0	
Majority		1,167	35.5	
Turnout		3,287	32.8	
Labour win (new seat)				
Labour win (new seat)				
Labour win (new seat)				

=== No.4 (Irlam: Cadishead) ===
Irlam: Cadishead
Party	Candidate	Votes	%	±%
Labour	J. Smith	1,347	55.5	
Labour	J. Craig	1,330	54.6	
Labour	M. McDermott	1,232	50.7	
Conservative	H. Ashton	961	39.6	
Conservative	J. Hughes	953	39.2	
Conservative	M. Fletcher	904	37.2	
Communist	P. Hardman	122	5.0	
Majority		271	11.1	
Turnout		2,429	45.7	
Labour win (new seat)				
Labour win (new seat)				
Labour win (new seat)				

=== No.5 (Irlam: Irlam) ===
Irlam: Irlam
Party	Candidate	Votes	%	±%
Labour	T. Marshall	1,673	44.4	
Labour	V. Prior	1,514	40.2	
Labour	J. Hudson	1,498	39.8	
Conservative	J. Melia	1,246	33.1	
Conservative	R. Holt	1,204	32.0	
Conservative	R. Dalziel	922	24.5	
Independent	J. Sharrock	705	18.7	
Communist	T. Robinson	143	3.8	
Majority		252	6.7	
Turnout		3,768	41.6	
Labour win (new seat)				
Labour win (new seat)				
Labour win (new seat)				

=== No.6 (Salford: Kersal) ===
Salford: Kersal
Party	Candidate	Votes	%	±%
Conservative	R. Heron	1,372	37.1	
Conservative	G. Roth	1,290	34.9	
Conservative	H. Weinberg	1,260	34.1	
Labour	M. Jackson	1,182	31.9	
Labour	J. Hodgkiss	1,097	29.6	
Labour	M. Stewart	1,039	28.1	
Liberal	M. Corwin	1,033	27.9	
Liberal	H. Kershner	961	26.0	
Liberal	A. Trainor	767	20.7	
Communist	E. Plumbley	109	2.9	
Majority		78	2.2	
Turnout		3,700	33.0	
Conservative win (new seat)				
Conservative win (new seat)				
Conservative win (new seat)				

=== No.7 (Salford: Mandley Park) ===
Salford: Mandley Park
Party	Candidate	Votes	%	±%
Labour	L. Mallinson	1,433	63.0	
Labour	L. Cooke	1,291	56.8	
Labour	T. Warrington	1,209	53.2	
Conservative	V. Smith	741	32.6	
Conservative	F. Ford	718	31.6	
Conservative	M. McAtee	690	30.3	
Communist	W. Sproston	97	4.3	
Majority		468	20.6	
Turnout		2,274	32.5	
Labour win (new seat)				
Labour win (new seat)				
Labour win (new seat)				

=== No.8 (Salford: Albert Park) ===
Salford: Albert Park
Party	Candidate	Votes	%	±%
Labour	J. Bryans	1,242	74.8	
Labour	R. Dodd	1,109	66.8	
Labour	J. Jaffe	1,023	61.6	
Conservative	J. Doyle	418	25.2	
Conservative	A. Boardman	416	25.0	
Majority		605	36.4	
Turnout		1,661	22.7	
Labour win (new seat)				
Labour win (new seat)				
Labour win (new seat)				

=== No.9 (Salford: Crescent-St. Matthias'-Trinity) ===
Salford: Crescent-St. Matthias'-Trinity
Party	Candidate	Votes	%	±%
Labour	J. Hincks	1,223	53.4	
Labour	J. Murphy	1,214	53.0	
Labour	B. Wallsworth	1,213	52.9	
Conservative	F. Fenton	655	28.6	
Conservative	J. Bradbury	565	24.7	
Conservative	R. Lomas	470	20.5	
Liberal	E. Hyde	416	18.2	
Liberal	H. Welsby	412	18.0	
Majority		558	24.3	
Turnout		2,292	25.0	
Labour win (new seat)				
Labour win (new seat)				
Labour win (new seat)				

=== No.10 (Salford: Regent-Ordsall Park) ===
Salford: Regent-Ordsall Park
Party	Candidate	Votes	%	±%
Labour	W. Jackson	uncontested		
Labour	S. Turner	uncontested		
Labour	K. Murray	uncontested		
Labour win (new seat)				
Labour win (new seat)				
Labour win (new seat)				

=== No.11 (Salford: Docks-St. Paul's) ===
Salford: Docks-St. Paul's
Party	Candidate	Votes	%	±%
Labour	G. Wilcock	1,689	51.6	
Labour	T. Loftus	1,683	51.4	
Labour	D. Robinson	1,646	50.3	
Liberal	J. Whittaker	1,083	33.1	
Liberal	A. Trevitt	840	25.7	
Liberal	J. Yates	733	22.4	
Conservative	W. Eddes	503	15.4	
Majority		563	17.2	
Turnout		3,273	30.4	
Labour win (new seat)				
Labour win (new seat)				
Labour win (new seat)				

=== No.12 (Salford: Charlestown-St. Thomas') ===
Salford: Charlestown-St. Thomas'
Party	Candidate	Votes	%	±%
Labour	J. Holt	1,200	71.6	
Labour	L. Hough	1,168	69.6	
Labour	J. Thomas	1,123	67.0	
Conservative	R. Allport	396	23.6	
Communist	J. Brogan	78	4.7	
Majority		727	43.4	
Turnout		1,677	24.7	
Labour win (new seat)				
Labour win (new seat)				
Labour win (new seat)				

=== No.13 (Salford: Seedley-Langworthy) ===
Salford: Seedley-Langworthy
Party	Candidate	Votes	%	±%
Labour	B. Grimshaw	2,109	59.3	
Labour	J. Hill	2,053	57.7	
Labour	I. Zott	1,986	55.8	
Conservative	A. Foulkes	1,274	35.8	
Conservative	D. Stafford	1,219	34.3	
Conservative	R. Stones	1,203	33.8	
Communist	J. Arnison	178	5.0	
Majority		712	20.0	
Turnout		3,558	29.8	
Labour win (new seat)				
Labour win (new seat)				
Labour win (new seat)				

=== No.14 (Salford: Weaste) ===
Salford: Weaste
Party	Candidate	Votes	%	±%
Labour	N. Openshaw	1,453	62.6	
Labour	J. Hardman	1,449	62.4	
Labour	H. Openshaw	1,438	62.0	
Conservative	M. Ford	868	37.4	
Conservative	E. Duffy	826	35.6	
Conservative	J. Stravers	781	33.6	
Majority		570	24.6	
Turnout		2,321	28.1	
Labour win (new seat)				
Labour win (new seat)				
Labour win (new seat)				

=== No.15 (Salford: Claremont) ===
Salford: Claremont
Party	Candidate	Votes	%	±%
Conservative	M. Hopkins	2,041	62.9	
Conservative	M. Cooper	1,983	61.1	
Conservative	S. Cooper	1,958	60.3	
Labour	J. Gallagher	1,202	37.0	
Labour	J. Sumbland	1,170	36.1	
Labour	J. Birmingham	1,117	34.4	
Majority		756	23.3	
Turnout		3,245	33.4	
Conservative win (new seat)				
Conservative win (new seat)				
Conservative win (new seat)				

=== No.16 (Swinton and Pendlebury: Broad Oak-Old Park) ===
Swinton and Pendlebury: Broad Oak-Old Park
Party	Candidate	Votes	%	±%
Conservative	E. Muldoon	1,684	41.4	
Conservative	G. Barnes	1,631	40.1	
Conservative	E. Bond	1,578	38.8	
Labour	I. Jones	1,320	32.4	
Labour	T. Harrison	1,293	31.8	
Labour	J. Wood	1,203	29.6	
Liberal	R. Berry	936	23.0	
Liberal	S. Collier	881	21.7	
Liberal	A. Collier	807	19.8	
Communist	A. Lewis	133	3.3	
Majority		258	6.4	
Turnout		4,069	45.5	
Conservative win (new seat)				
Conservative win (new seat)				
Conservative win (new seat)				

=== No.17 (Swinton and Pendlebury: Central-Moorside-Newtown) ===
Swinton and Pendlebury: Central-Moorside-Newtown
Party	Candidate	Votes	%	±%
Labour	J. Hill	2,456	60.1	
Labour	B. Sampson	2,442	59.8	
Labour	H. Shaw	2,364	57.9	
Conservative	D. Muldoon	1,448	35.4	
Conservative	M. Simm	1,397	34.2	
Conservative	L. Gerrard	1,307	32.0	
Communist	H. Crellin	183	4.5	
Majority		916	22.5	
Turnout		4,086	35.2	
Labour win (new seat)				
Labour win (new seat)				
Labour win (new seat)				

=== No.18 (Swinton and Pendlebury: Clifton-East) ===
Swinton and Pendlebury: Clifton-East
Party	Candidate	Votes	%	±%
Labour	F. Brockbank	2,121	65.2	
Labour	H. Singleton	2,040	62.7	
Labour	R. Porter	2,037	62.7	
Conservative	M. Horn	899	27.7	
Conservative	M. Blainey	890	27.4	
Conservative	T. Wall	860	26.5	
Communist	H. Suss	229	7.0	
Majority		1,138	35.0	
Turnout		3,251	35.9	
Labour win (new seat)				
Labour win (new seat)				
Labour win (new seat)				

=== No.19 (Worsley: Armitage-Mount Skip-St. Mary's) ===
Worsley: Armitage-Mount Skip-St. Mary's
Party	Candidate	Votes	%	±%
Labour	W. Pennington	2,204	66.5	
Labour	S. Dumbarton	2,022	61.0	
Labour	M. Shelmerdine	1,991	60.1	
Conservative	J. Howard	920	27.8	
Conservative	J. Dargie	870	26.3	
Communist	V. Booth	186	5.6	
Majority		1,071	32.3	
Turnout		3,313	30.2	
Labour win (new seat)				
Labour win (new seat)				
Labour win (new seat)				

=== No.20 (Worsley: Kenyon-Peel) ===
Worsley: Kenyon-Peel
Party	Candidate	Votes	%	±%
Labour	T. Hobbs	1,465	74.0	
Labour	S. Martin	1,448	73.1	
Labour	J. Tonkin	1,437	72.5	
Conservative	P. Howard	374	18.9	
Conservative	E. Cunliffe	371	18.7	
Communist	P. Willetts	143	7.2	
Majority		1,063	53.6	
Turnout		1,982	26.7	
Labour win (new seat)				
Labour win (new seat)				
Labour win (new seat)				

=== No.21 (Worsley: Central-Linnyshaw) ===
Worsley: Central-Linnyshaw
Party	Candidate	Votes	%	±%
Labour	S. Wood	1,588	40.0	
Labour	P. Rowson	1,575	39.7	
Liberal	E. J. Holt	1,523	38.4	
Labour	J. Anderson	1,463	36.9	
Liberal	J. Stell	1,424	35.9	
Liberal	A. Smith	1,165	29.4	
Conservative	C. Basson	857	21.6	
Conservative	L. Barcroft	833	21.0	
Conservative	J. Blythe	790	19.9	
Majority		60	1.5	
Turnout		3,967	44.0	
Labour win (new seat)				
Labour win (new seat)				
Liberal win (new seat)				

=== No.22 (Worsley: Park-Worsley) ===
Worsley: Park-Worsley
Party	Candidate	Votes	%	±%
Conservative	J. Catlow	2,069	68.9	
Conservative	J. McDonald	2,036	67.8	
Conservative	C. Schofield	1,980	65.9	
Labour	A. Longworth	932	31.0	
Labour	R. Godfrey	894	29.8	
Labour	D. Platt	875	29.1	
Majority		1,048	34.9	
Turnout		3,004	33.9	
Conservative win (new seat)				
Conservative win (new seat)				
Conservative win (new seat)				
