= Moorside High School, Swinton =

Moorside High School

Location
- Swinton, Salford; England; 53°30′29″N 2°20′49″W

Information
- Type: Academy
- Motto: Together We Believe, Achieve, Succeed.
- Established: 1934
- Local authority: Salford
- Trust: Consilium Academies
- Department for Education URN: 144199 Tables
- Ofsted: Reports
- Chair: Jonathan Sly
- Headteacher: Helen Ryles-Dean
- Gender: Coeducational
- Age: 11 to 16
- Enrolment: 1,160 pupils
- Website: www.moorsidehigh.co.uk

Moorside High School is a coeducational secondary academy located in Swinton, Salford, Greater Manchester, England. Established in 1934, the school serves students aged 11 to 16 and is part of the Consilium Academies trust.

As of April 2025, Moorside High School has an enrolment of 1,160 pupils, exceeding its capacity of 1,050. The school is situated at 57 Deans Road, Swinton, and shares its campus with Moorside Community Primary School and The Deans Youth Centre, fostering a collaborative educational environment.

In its most recent inspection in March 2022, Ofsted rated the school as "Good," noting that pupils feel safe and are happy at school, and that staff resolve any bullying issues quickly and effectively.

== History ==
Moorside High School was established in 1934 to serve the growing community of Swinton, Salford. Originally a small secondary school, it expanded in the 20th century in response to increasing demand for education in the area.

During the 1960s and 1970s, the school underwent several expansions to accommodate a rising student population. By the early 2000s, the original buildings had become outdated, prompting plans for redevelopment. Between 2011 and 2013, Moorside High School underwent a £35 million rebuild as part of the Building Schools for the Future programme, a national government initiative aimed at rebuilding secondary schools across England. The project resulted in a modern campus, with new facilities and a new entrance accessible from the East Lancashire Road (A580).

In March 2018, Moorside High School converted from a community school administered by Salford City Council to academy status. It is now part of the Consilium Academies Trust.

Today, Moorside High School shares its campus with Moorside Community Primary School and The Deans Youth Centre.

== Notable former pupils ==
- Raffey Cassidy, actress
- Ryan Giggs, footballer and manager
- Harrison Hansen, rugby league player
- Chris Johnson, television presenter
- Danielle Nicholls, television presenter and radio host
- Jorgie Porter, actress and model
