= Agecroft Cemetery =

Public cemetery in Greater Manchester, England

Coordinates: 53°30′35″N 2°17′40″W

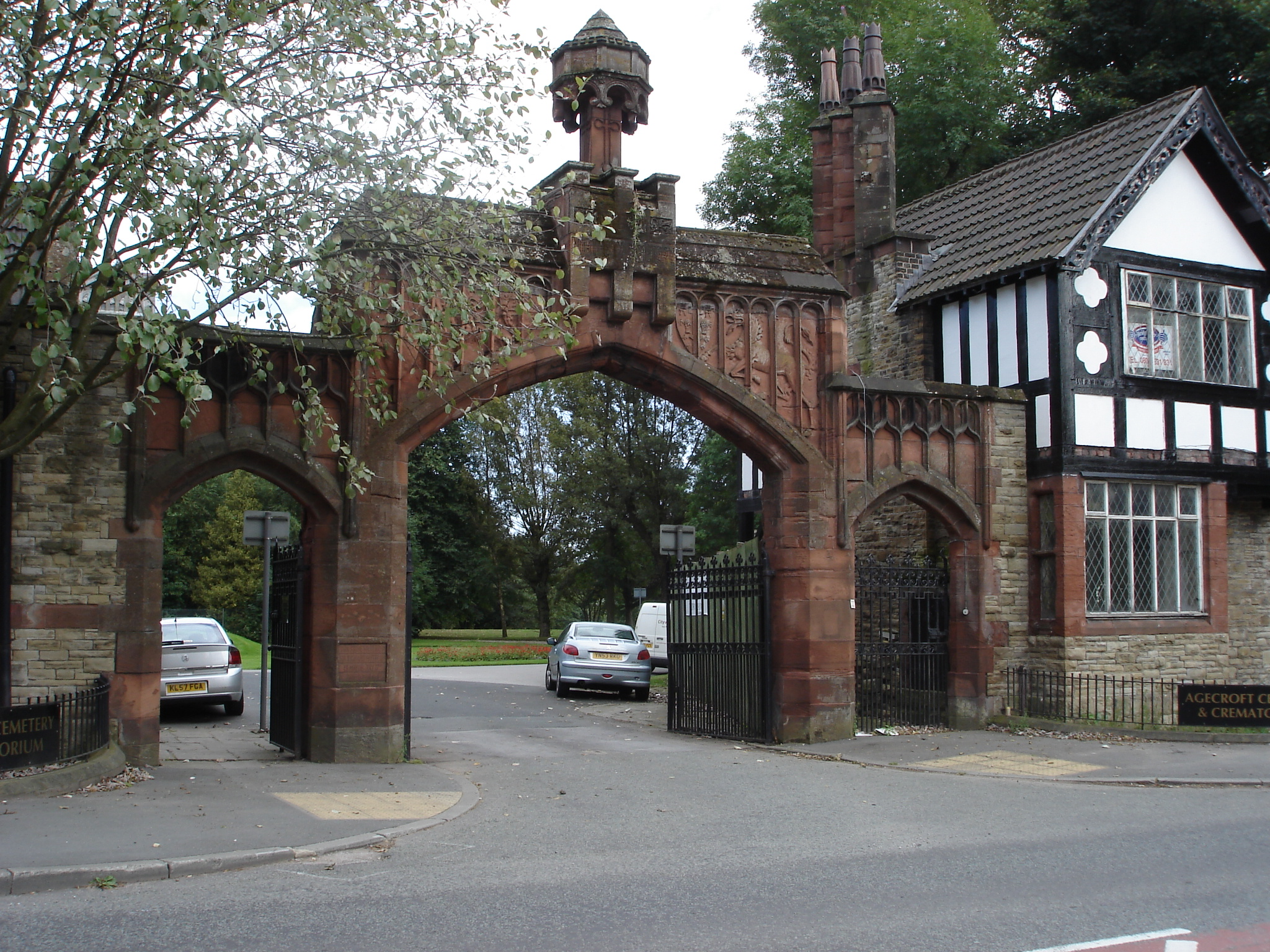
Agecroft Cemetery main entrance, Langley Road

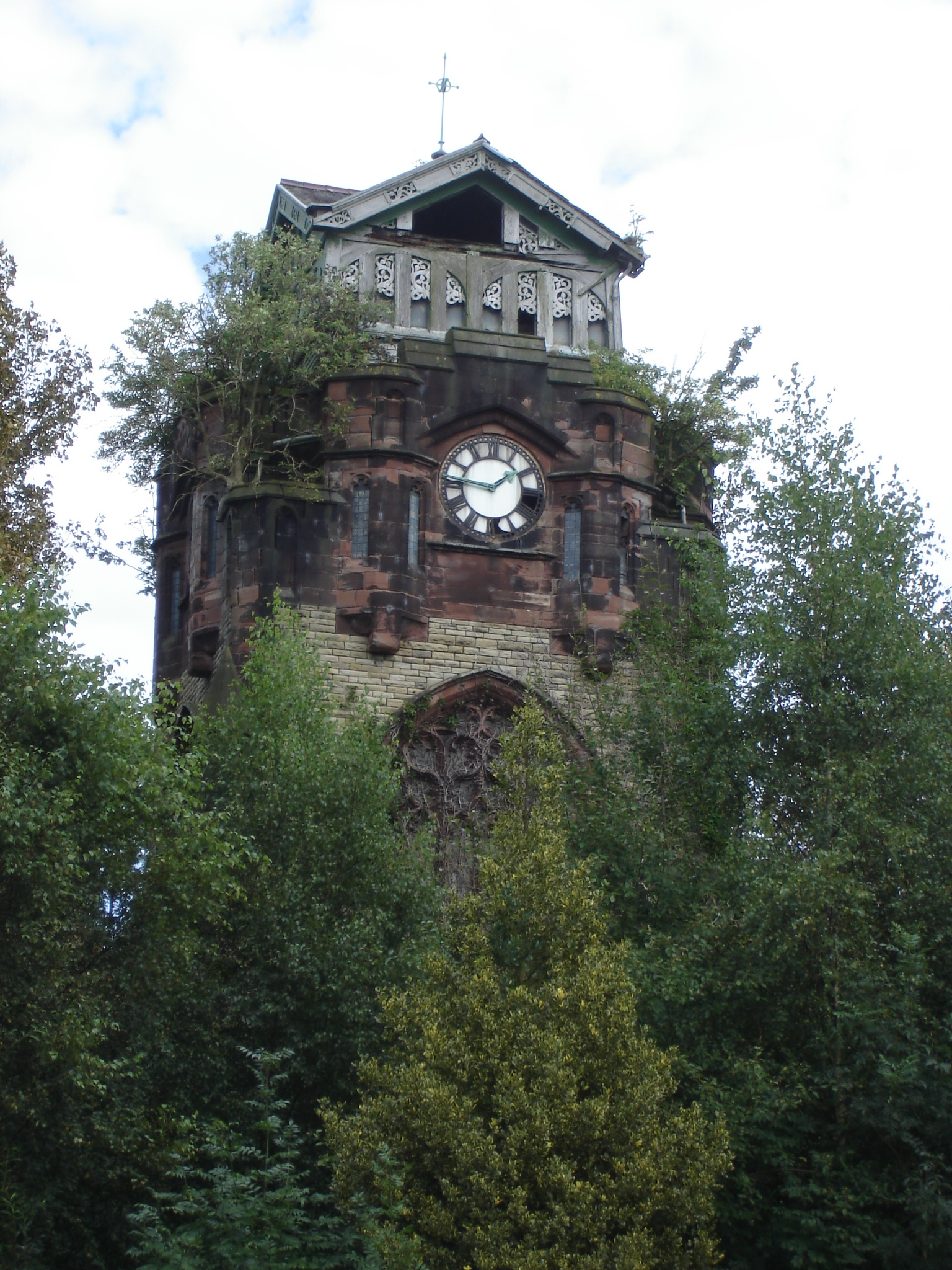
Mortuary chapel clock tower

Agecroft Cemetery and Crematorium is a public cemetery in Pendlebury, Salford, Greater Manchester.

Agecroft Cemetery was opened as Salford Northern Cemetery by Alderman Sir William Stephens of Salford County Borough Council on 2 July 1903 on 45 acres (18.2 hectares) of ground because the existing cemetery at Weaste was near to capacity. The new cemetery, which lies in the Irwell Valley alongside the river bounded by Agecroft Road (A6044) and Langley Road in Pendlebury, was initially outside the Salford county borough boundary, but has lain within the city since Pendlebury was incorporated into the City of Salford in 1974. Since the cemetery was opened more than 53,700 interments have been carried out. The original non-conformist chapel was converted to a crematorium in January 1957 which since then has handled nearly 60,000 cremation services. The crematorium chapel can hold up to 60 mourners.

In the grounds is a large disused mortuary chapel with a clock tower. It is now derelict and hidden by trees. It is listed as a heritage building at risk by the Victorian Society. At the very opposite side of the cemetery to what was the original non-conformist chapel (and now the crematorium), there stood a Roman Catholic chapel surrounded largely by Catholic graves. This was pulled down many years ago and all that remains is a grassed/shrubbery roundabout.

Near the entrance is a stone memorial to the seven-man crew of Lancaster bomber PB304 which crashed in Regatta Street, off Langley Road, Agecroft, Pendlebury very close to the then boundary between Pendleton, Salford and Pendlebury on 30 July 1944 carrying a full bomb load.

The cemetery contains the war graves of 164 Commonwealth service personnel of both of the 20th century's world wars. The majority of the graves are scattered within the cemetery but there is a group of eleven and two special memorial headstones to those whose graves could not be marked.
