= Swinton Square =

Shopping centre in Swinton, Greater Manchester, England

Coordinates: 53.51258°N 2.33838°W

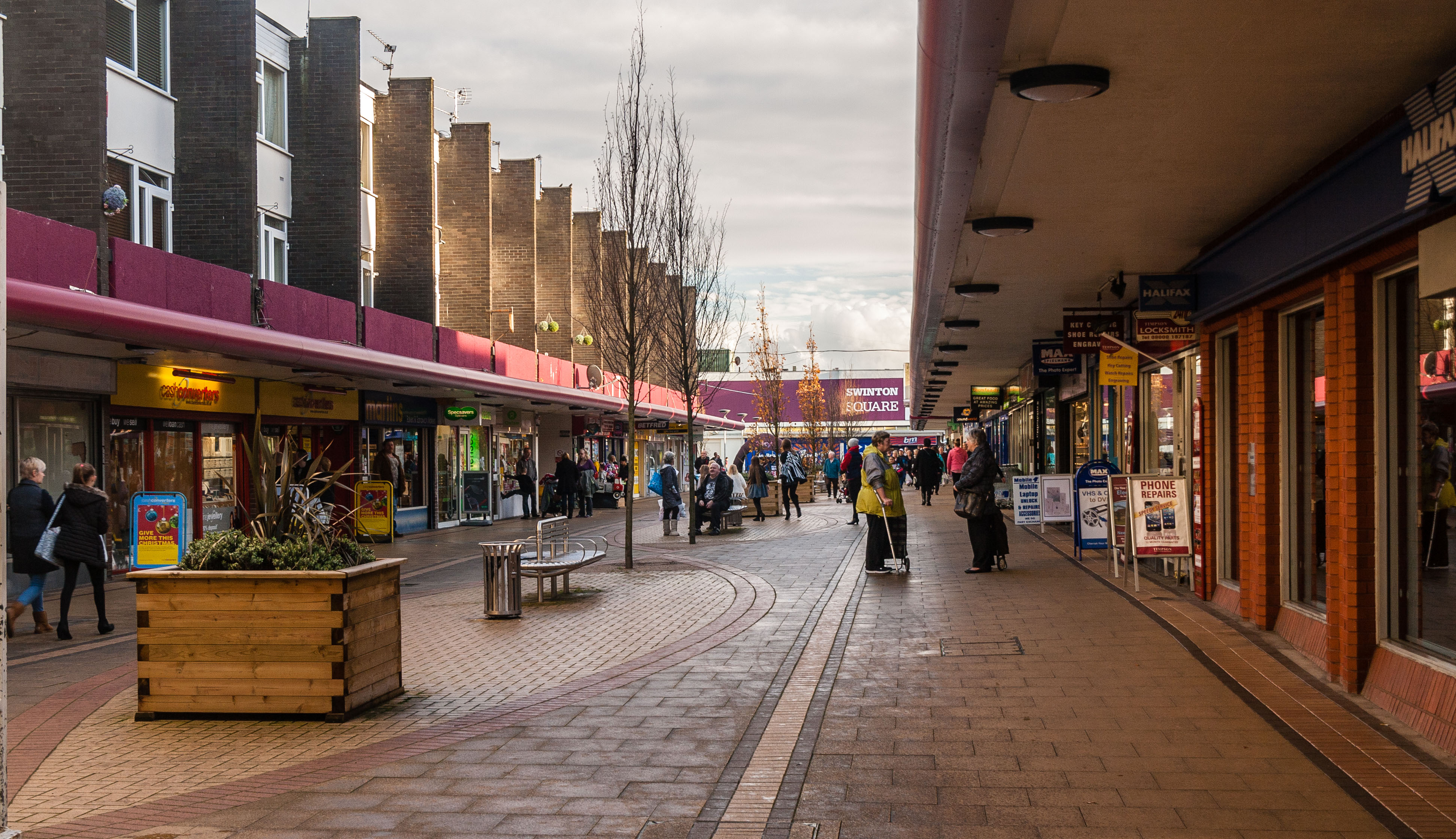
Swinton Square

Swinton Square, formerly known as Swinton Shopping Centre, is a shopping centre located between Chorley Road (A6) and Swinton Hall Road in Swinton, near Manchester, England.

The centre was built in 1966. Swinton Square houses a diverse number of shops, with many specialising in a certain area of life. It also held a small open air market until fairly recently. The complex includes the 1970s Swinton Library and the Lancastrian Hall As part of the recent redevelopment of the shopping area, a new Asda superstore opened in 2014. There is also a Morrisons superstore nearby on Swinton Hall Road, which was originally built in 1992 as a Safeway UK store, until Morrisons acquired the Safeway chain in 2004. The store was eventually rebranded to Morrisons in November 2005.

== Facilities ==
Swinton Square does not have its own parking. Instead parking is controlled by Parking Eye in the nearby Asda car park. There is a time limit of 3 hour, after which Parking Eye issue parking charges of £100, correct at June 2025, this limit applies equally to Blue Badge holders. The limit applies to all shoppers including those visiting the Asda store.

A trial of pay and display parking from 2005 to 2010 resulted in complaints from over 4,000 people who demanded its removal. Traders at Swinton Shopping Centre said that business had fallen by up to a third since the introduction of pay-and-display in 2005.

The precinct is mainly on ground floor level and easily accessible for disabled patrons via the main entrance on Station Road (B5231).

== Shops ==
Swinton Square has a variety of shops, although effected the same way as many other high street facilities now in decline, here there remains a good selection which are promoted through its own web site, swinton-shoppingcentre.co.uk the shopping area benefits from ease of access in public areas for wheelchair users.

== Market ==
Swinton Square operated a small open air market until recent times every Tuesday, Thursday, Friday and Saturday from 9.00am until 4.30pm. It was located in one of the large spaces that the precinct has. In recent years the market has had a stand-alone roof fitted over the market stalls.

== Swinton Library ==
Swinton Library is two minutes walk away on foot in Swinton Gateway building, the library has its own web site which details its operations including facilities now available at the Salford Community Leisure site. The library was formerly located next to the square.
