= Tony Morrin =

English footballer (1946–2020)

Personal information
- Full name: Anthony John Morrin
- Date of birth: 31 July 1946
- Place of birth: Swinton, England
- Date of death: 14 December 2020 (aged 74)
- Position: Midfielder

Youth career
- Bury

Senior career*
Years	Team	Apps	(Gls)
1963–1965	Bury	3	(0)
1965–1966	Burnley	0	(0)
1966	Doncaster Rovers	0	(0)
1966–1969	Stockport County	31	(2)
1969–1971	Barrow	97	(6)
1971–77	Exeter City	182	(1)
1977	Stockport County	13	(15)
1977–????	Rochdale	29	(1)
- Bangor
- * Club domestic league appearances and goals

Tony Morrin (31 July 1946 – 14 December 2020) was an English footballer who played as a midfielder.
