= Victoria Park, Swinton =

Park in Swinton, Greater Manchester, England

Victoria Park
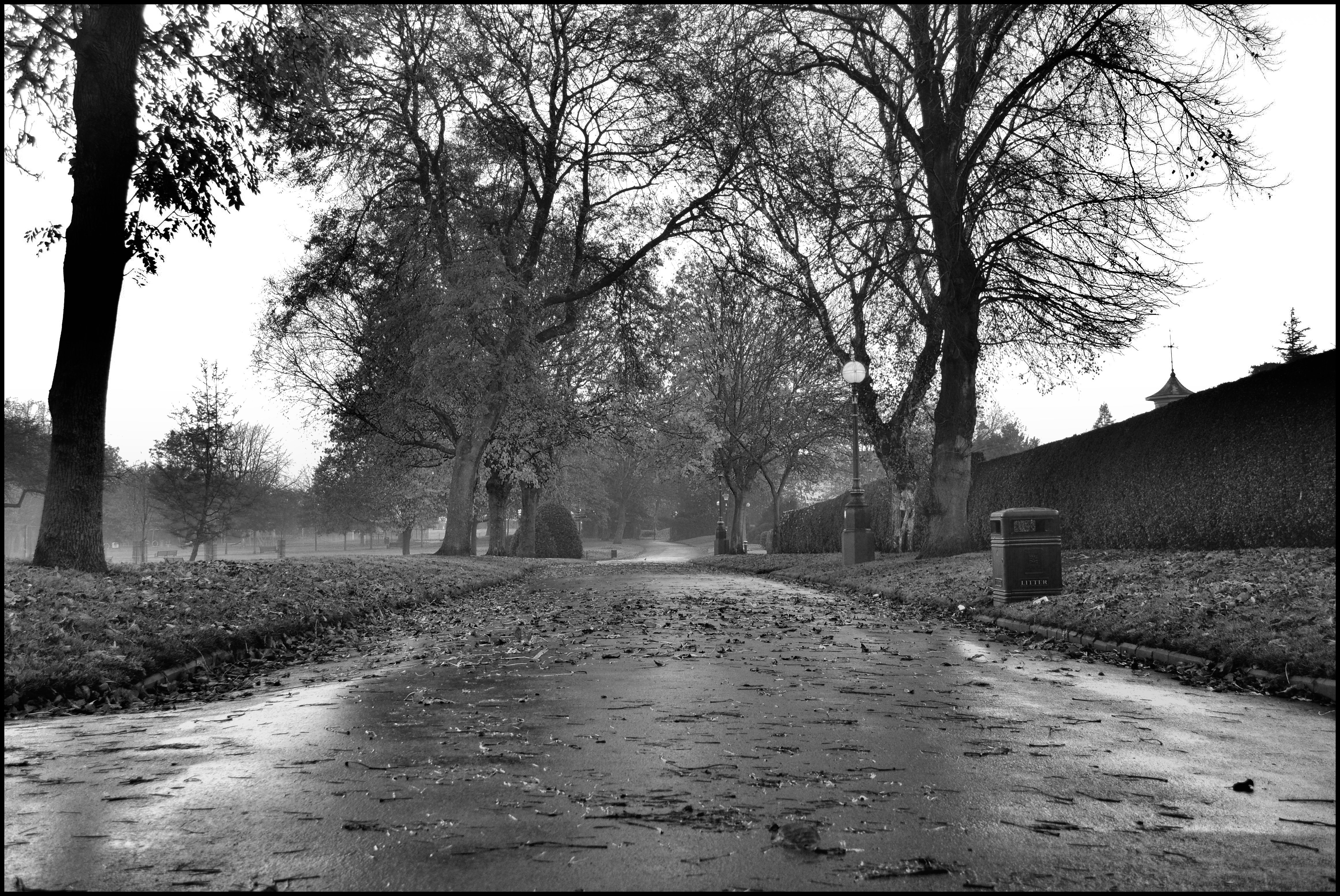
- Interactive map of Victoria Park
- Type: Municipal park
- Location: Swinton, Greater Manchester, England
- Coordinates: 53.5090°N 2.3275°W
- Created: 1897
- Operator: City of Salford

Victoria Park is a park in Swinton, Greater Manchester. Situated on Manchester Road (A6), Swinton, it opened as a public park in 1897.

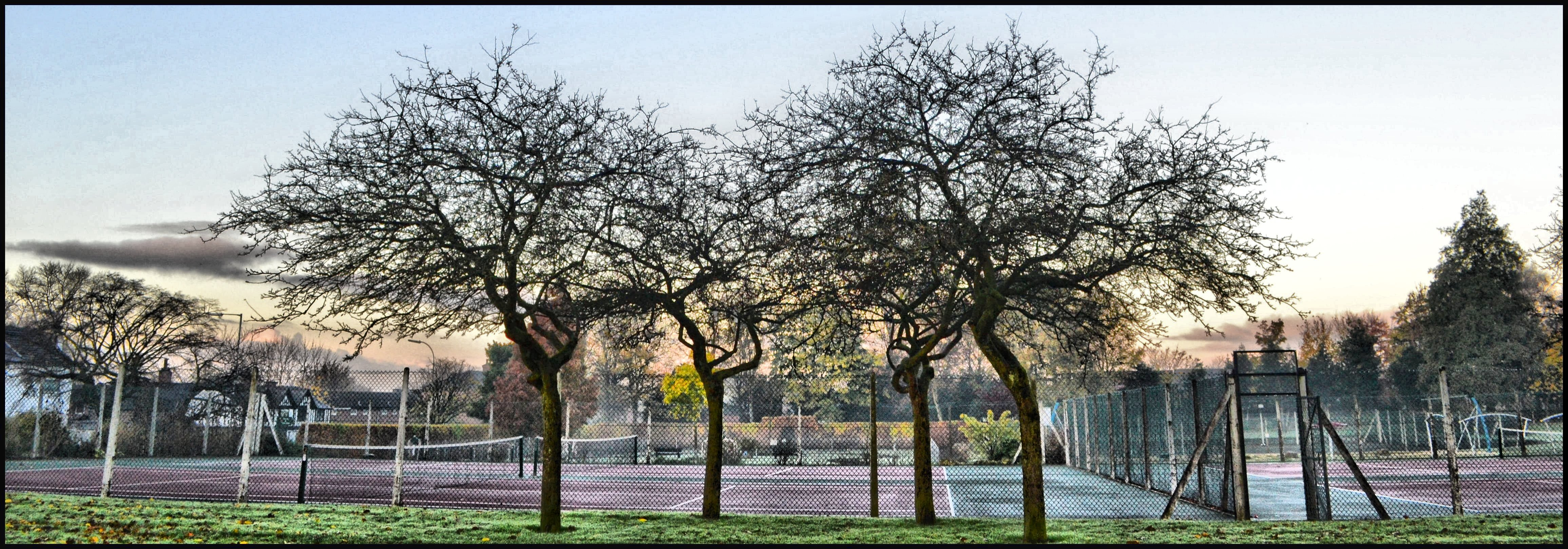
View of the tennis courts

Victoria Park is made up of the grounds of Swinton Old Hall; the hall itself being demolished in 1993. Having tennis courts and two bowling greens, Victoria Park is home to a Grade II listed Victorian bandstand built to commemorate the 60th year of the reign of Queen Victoria; the bandstand being built around 1897.

Swinton and Pendlebury received its Charter of Incorporation as a municipal borough from Edward Stanley, 18th Earl of Derby at a ceremony in Victoria Park on 29 September 1934.

Victoria Park has been awarded three Green Flag Awards. The Green Flag Scheme is a national standard for public parks and green spaces that aims to raise standards across the UK. This award puts Victoria Park alongside Brighton Pier, London Zoo, Alton Towers and the Norfolk Broads.
