= Swinton, Greater Manchester =

Town in Greater Manchester, England

Swinton
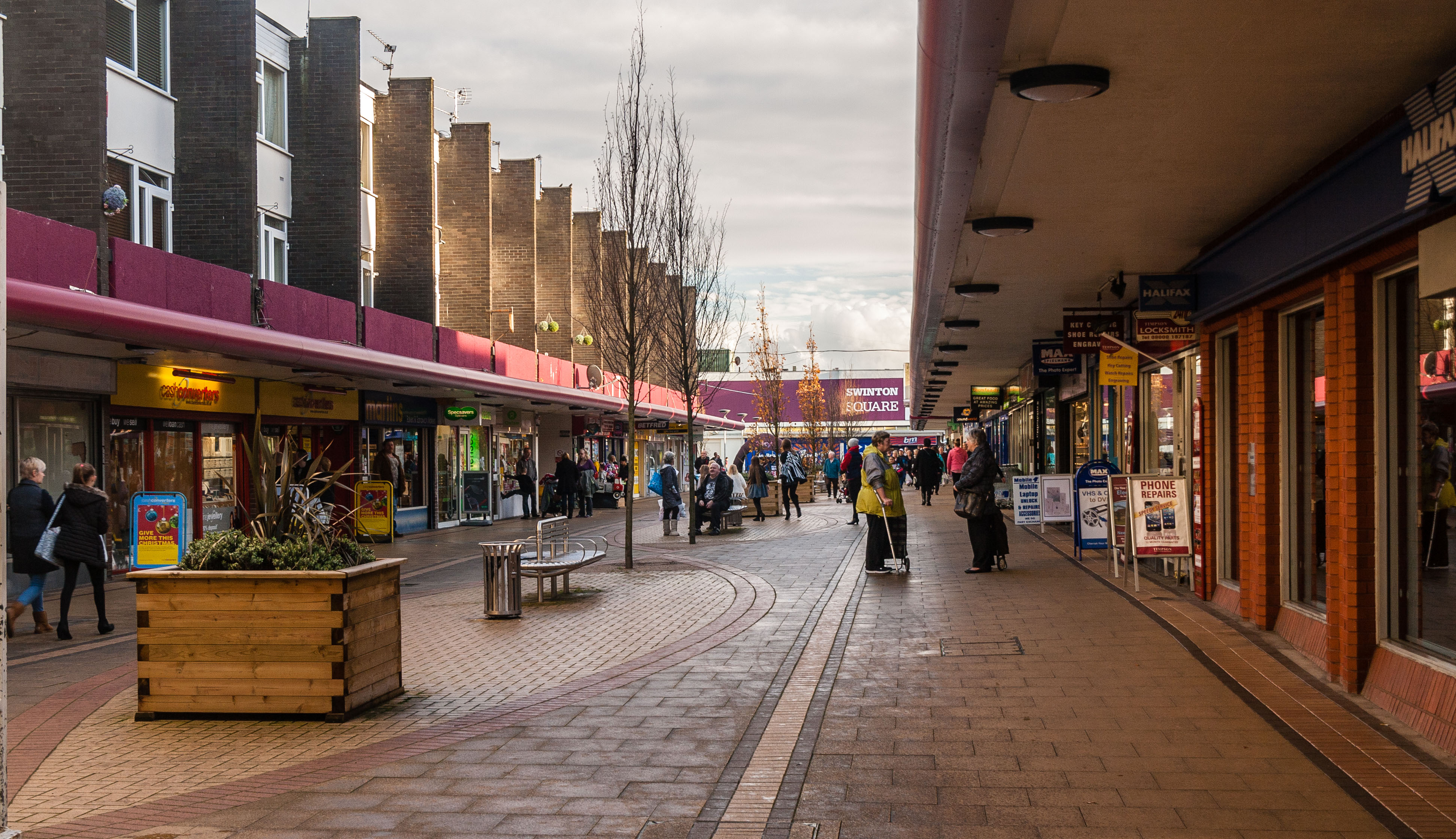
- Swinton town centre

- Location within Greater Manchester
- Population: 22,931 (2014 estimate)
- OS grid reference: SD775015
  - London: 167 mi (269 km) SE
- Metropolitan borough: City of Salford
- Metropolitan county: Greater Manchester
- Region: North West
- Country: England
- Sovereign state: United Kingdom
- Post town: MANCHESTER
- Postcode district: M27
- Dialling code: 0161
- Police: Greater Manchester
- Fire: Greater Manchester
- Ambulance: North West
- UK Parliament: Worsley and Eccles, Salford

Swinton is a town in Greater Manchester, England, southwest of the River Irwell, 4 miles (6.4 km) northwest of Manchester, adjoining Pendlebury and Clifton. In 2014, it had a population of 22,931.

Historically in Lancashire, for centuries Swinton was a hamlet in the township of Worsley, parish of Eccles and hundred of Salfordshire. The name Swinton is derived from the Old English "Swynton" meaning "swine town". In the High Middle Ages, Swinton was held by the religious orders of the Knights Hospitaller and Whalley Abbey. Farming was the main occupation, with locals supplementing their incomes by hand-loom woollen weaving in the domestic system.

Collieries opened during the Industrial Revolution and Swinton became an important industrial area with coal providing the fuel for the cotton spinning and brickmaking industries. Bricks from Swinton were used for industrial projects including the Bridgewater Canal, which passes Swinton to the south. The adoption of the factory system facilitated a process of unplanned urbanisation in the area, and by the mid-19th century Swinton was an important mill town and coal mining district at a convergence of factories, brickworks and a newly constructed road and railway network.

Following the Local Government Act 1894, Swinton was united with neighbouring Pendlebury to become an urban district of Lancashire. Swinton and Pendlebury received a charter of incorporation in 1934, giving it honorific borough status. In the same year, the United Kingdom's first purpose-built intercity highway—the major A580 road (East Lancashire Road), which terminates at Swinton and Pendlebury's southern boundary—was officially opened by King George V. Swinton and Pendlebury became part of the City of Salford in 1974. Swinton is the seat of Salford City Council and a commuter town, supported by its transport network and proximity to Manchester city centre.

== History ==
The name Swinton derives from the Old English swin, pigs and tun, an enclosure, farmstead or manor estate. An early form was Swynton.

During the Middle Ages, Swinton belonged to Whalley Abbey. Later, lands at Swinton were granted to Thurston Tyldesley, then of Wardley Hall. Documents record that certain areas belonged to the Knights Hospitaller.

In 1817 some Swinton weavers joined in the Blanketeers' demonstration and marched to London to put their grievances to the Prince Regent. In 1842 some Swinton people took part in Chartist agitations and tried to destroy a local colliery.

Sunday schools and libraries were established in Swinton at quite an early period. Swinton Industrial School was visited by Charles Dickens. The school was created by the Manchester Poor Law Union. In contrast with other institutions for the poor around that time, which were places of final resort, the Swinton Industrial School was built in response to a more enlightened attitude. The Manchester Poor Law Union saw the value of a place where children could be cared for and educated. The school opened in 1843 and survived until the 1920s. During demolition of the school buildings in the early 1930s, the foundations proved particularly difficult. Finally explosives were used, which resulted in a huge number of rats being disturbed. It was a number of weeks before council workers could remove the rats from the surrounding streets and houses. Huge nests of baby rats were carried out of the rafters of many buildings. The site was used for the present town hall.

== Governance ==
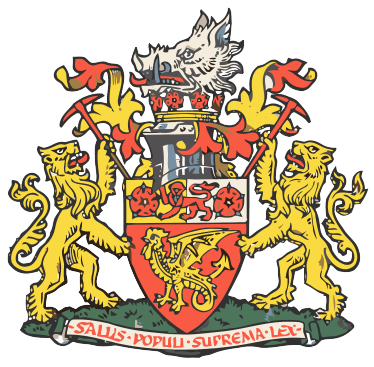
The coat of arms of the former Swinton and Pendlebury Municipal Borough Council, granted by the College of Arms 1 October 1934.

Lying within the historic county boundaries of Lancashire since the early 12th century, Swinton anciently formed part of the hundred of Salford (civil jurisdiction). Swinton's first local authority was a local board of health established in 1867. A regulatory body responsible for standards of hygiene and sanitation, it covered Swinton itself and the majority of the neighbouring township of Pendlebury. It changed its name to Swinton and Pendlebury Local Board of Health in 1869. Swinton was formerly a chapelry in the parish of Eccles, on 31 December 1894 Swinton became a separate civil parish, being formed from the part of Worsley in Swinton and Pendlebury Urban District. The area of the local board became Swinton and Pendlebury UD, an urban district of the administrative county of Lancashire. In 1907 there were exchanges of land with the neighbouring Worsley Urban District, and in 1933 most of Clifton and a part of Prestwich Urban District were added to Swinton and Pendlebury. On 1 April 1933 Swinton parish was abolished and merged with "Swinton and Pendlebury". In 1931 the parish had a population of 23,426. Swinton and Pendlebury received its Charter of Incorporation as a municipal borough from Edward Stanley, 18th Earl of Derby at a ceremony in Victoria Park on 29 September 1934. In 1955 a very small part of Worsley Urban District was added to Swinton and Pendlebury.

Under the Local Government Act 1972, the Municipal Borough of Swinton of Pendlebury was abolished, and Swinton has since 1 April 1974 formed an unparished area of the City of Salford, a metropolitan borough in the metropolitan county of Greater Manchester.

== Geography ==
Swinton lies at 53°30′44″N 2°20′28″W (53.5122°, −2.3412°), 167 miles (269 km) northwest of central London, and 4.2 miles (6.8 km) west-northwest of Manchester city centre. Topographically, Swinton occupies an area of gently sloping ground, roughly 213 feet (65 m) above sea level, and is on the south side of the River Irwell. Swinton lies in the west-central part of the Greater Manchester Urban Area, the UK's second largest conurbation. The M60 motorway passes Swinton on its northwest side.

== Landmarks ==
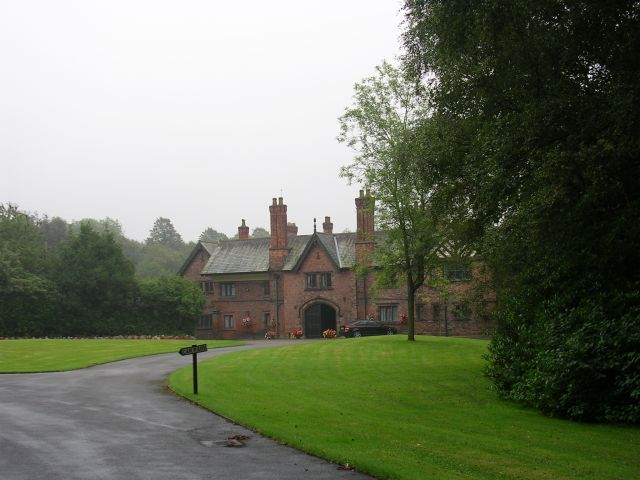
Wardley Hall

The architectural centrepiece of the town is the neoclassical Salford Civic Centre, which has a 125-foot (38 m) high clock tower. It was built as Swinton and Pendlebury Town Hall, when Swinton and Pendlebury received its Charter of Incorporation. Before its construction, council meetings were held in Victoria House in Victoria Park, but the borough council required larger premises. A competition was launched to design the new town hall; the winners were architects Percy Thomas and Ernest Prestwich with a design that closely resembled Swansea Guildhall. It later won the RIBA Gold Medal.

The site of the former Swinton Industrial School on Chorley Road was purchased for £12,500 and the foundation stone of the new town hall laid on 16 October 1936. The main builders were J. Gerrard's and Son of Swinton. The town hall opened on 17 September 1938. Extensions were built when it became the administrative headquarters of the City of Salford in 1974

Wardley Hall is an early medieval manor house and a Grade I listed building, and is the official residence of the Roman Catholic bishops of Salford.

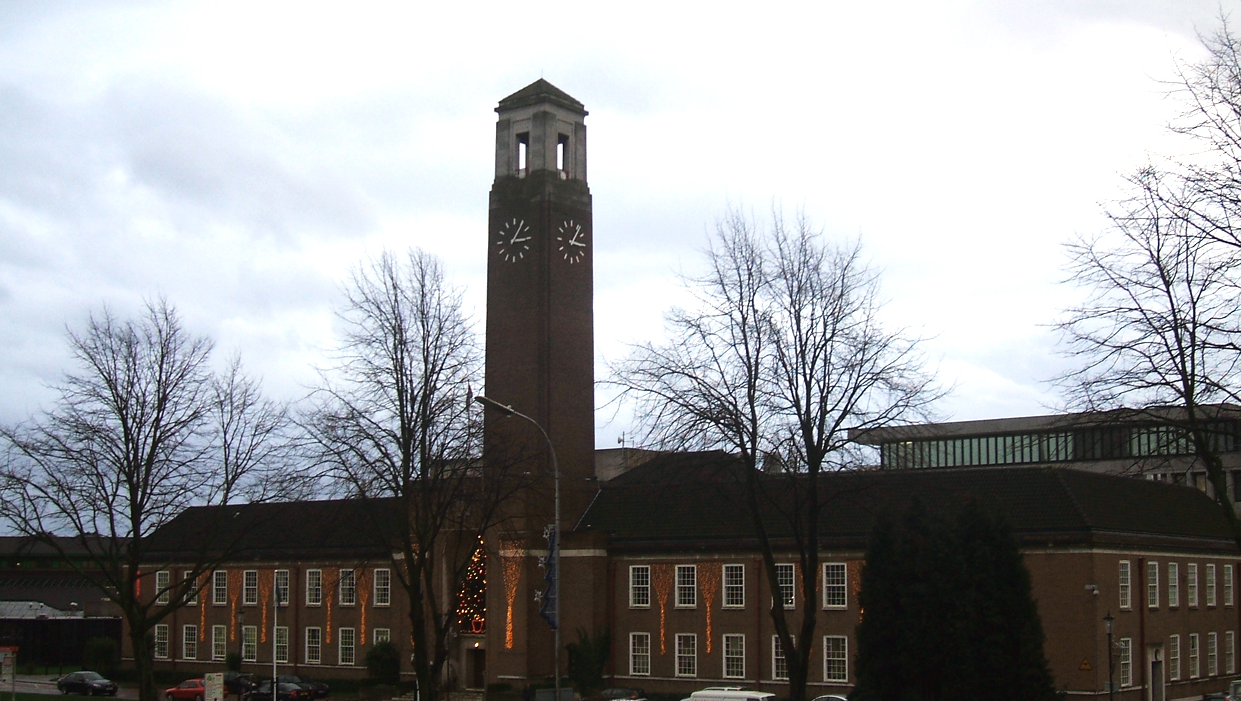
Salford Civic Centre

== Transport ==
Swinton is served by two railway stations on the Manchester–Southport line. Swinton railway station is near the town centre on Station Road (B5231), just over the boundary in Pendlebury. The other station is Moorside railway station near the top of Moorside Road, close to its junction with Chorley Road (A6). Until 1974 it was known as Moorside and Wardley railway station.

Several bus lines also run through Swinton, leading to Manchester city centre, Bolton and Trafford, among others.

== Sports ==
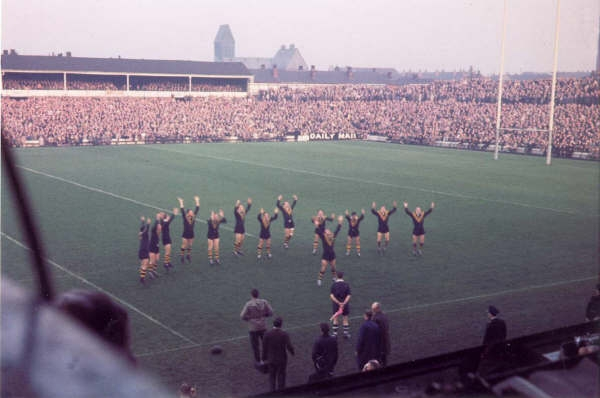
Test match between Great Britain and Australia at Station Road in November 1963

Swinton RLFC has an impressive record in rugby league considering the size of the town. The club's six Championship and three Challenge Cup wins is better than the record of their local rivals Salford RLFC. The club was based just over the local boundary in Pendlebury until 1992, when financial mismanagement necessitated a move from the Station Road ground to play at Gigg Lane in Bury. The financial failure of main creditor and de facto owner Hugh Eaves in 2002 put the future of the club in jeopardy and it spent a short time regrouping at Moor Lane in Kersal, as tenants of Salford City F.C. From 2003, the Lions played home games at Park Lane, Whitefield, home of Sedgley Park RUFC. In 2006, the club acquired land to build a 6,000 capacity stadium with training facilities and community use in Agecroft, Pendlebury. After ground-sharing with Leigh and Salford, the club moved to Heywood Road, Sale, home of Sale Rugby Union F.C. for the 2016 season onwards.

Swinton based junior association football side Deans F.C. was the starting point in the career of Ryan Giggs, who grew up in neighbouring Pendlebury and went on to become a Manchester United player, and also of Dean Holden.

== Schools ==
=== Primary ===
- Mossfield Primary School
- Broadoak Primary School
- The Deans Primary School
- Grosvenor Road Primary School
- Moorside Primary School
- St Charles' RC Primary School
- St Mary's RC Primary School
- St Peter's CE Primary School
- Wardley CE Primary School

==== St Peter's CE Primary School ====
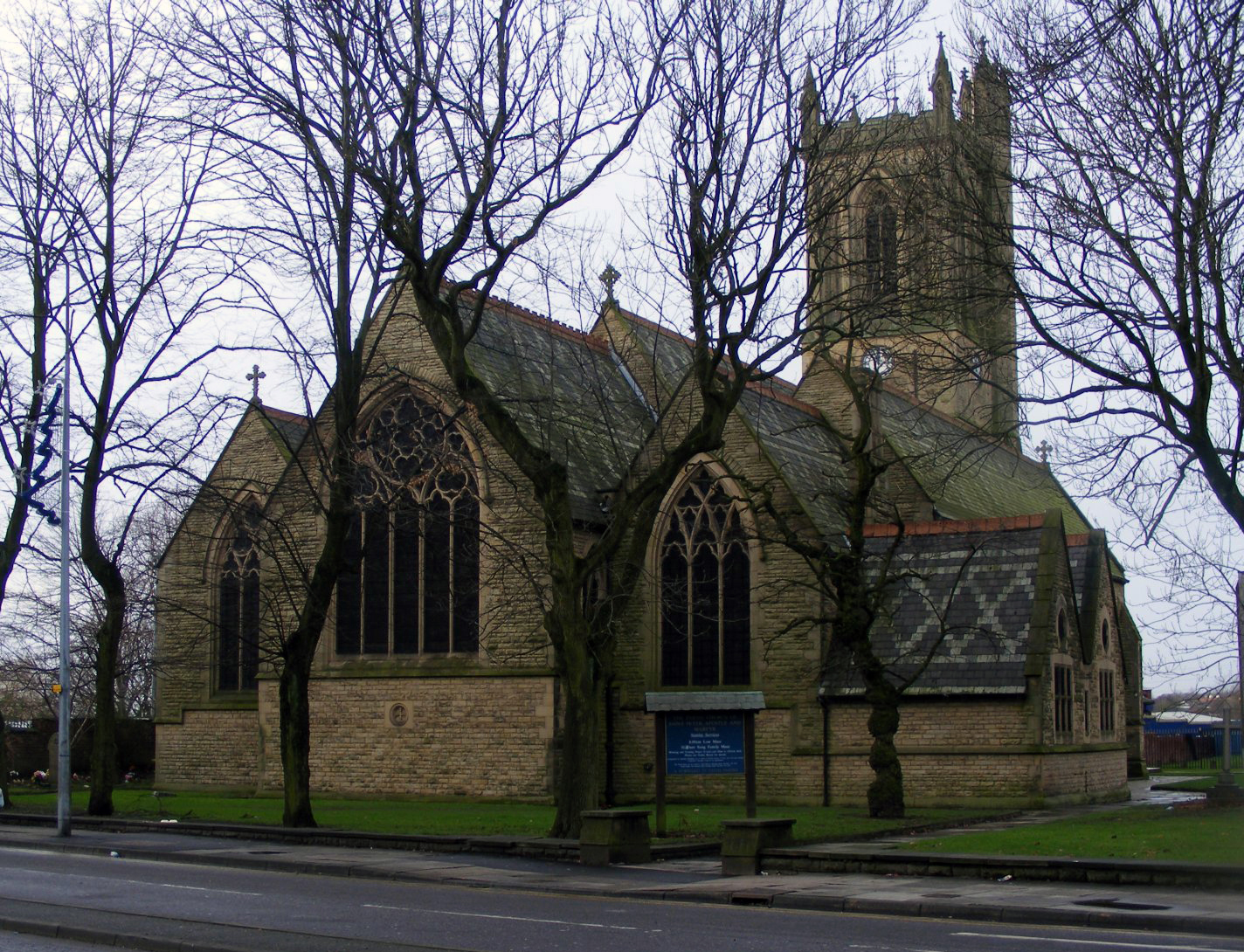
St Peter's Church, Swinton

St Peter's CE Primary School is a Church of England primary school located on Vicarage Road, Swinton; it is next to St Peter's Church and is a two-minute walk from Swinton Shopping Centre. The school is also located near Salford Civic Centre (formerly Swinton and Pendlebury Town Hall).

St Peter's School is split into two areas, Juniors and Infants. Like most primary schools in England, St. Peter's caters to children aged 3 to 11 (Years 1 to 6). In January 2011 the school placed 12th in the list of most popular primary schools in the city of Salford, with there being 30 places available with 40 parents listing the school as the first choice for their children leaving a surplus of 10 children. St Peter's is a feeder school for Moorside High School. At the time of the previous inspection children's skills on entry to the Nursery were below average but they have declined since then and are now well below average.

St. Peter's C. E. Primary School was not originally on the site that it now sits upon (the original 19th century school was where the Swinton Shopping Centre now stands). It was a much smaller school and therefore a much bigger building was needed. The current building started being constructed in 1905 and the work was finished in 1906. The school first opened its doors 1906 and has remained virtually unchanged ever since.

The school is subject to frequent outbreaks of vandalism and theft of outdoor and computer equipment. The school made the news in August 2016 when it was discovered that, James King, a teacher and head of year at the school had been stealing laptops and iPads to fund a gambling habit; in total he took the devices into different pawnbrokers to gain £1,620. He has since been banned from teaching indefinitely.

The school achieved:

- Basic Skills Quality Mark in November 2005.
- Healthy Schools Award in spring 2006 and the Artsmark Silver Award in May 2006.

School productions have included Joseph and the Amazing Technicolor Dreamcoat, performed in 2001, Alice in Wonderland, performed in 2002 and Oliver!, performed in 2003. The school staged another performance of Joseph and the Amazing Technicolor Dreamcoat in 2008 to say farewell to the then Headteacher, Mrs Walker as this was the first performance she experienced at the school.

=== Secondary ===
- Moorside High School, Deans Road, Swinton
- St Ambrose Barlow RC High School, Ash Drive, Wardley, Swinton
- Co-op Academy Swinton

== Churches ==
- St Peter's C of E, Chorley Road, Swinton
- All Saints' C of E, Charles Street, Swinton
- Holy Rood C of E, Moorside Road, Swinton
- St Charles' RC, Moorside Road, Swinton
- United Reformed, Worsley Road, Swinton
- Worsley Road Methodist, Worsley Road, Swinton
- Latter-Day Saints, Partington Lane, Swinton
- Bethesda Hall, Worsley Road, Swinton
- Manchester Road Methodist, Manchester Road, Swinton
- Jehovah's Witnesses, Swinton Hall Road, Swinton

== Notable people ==
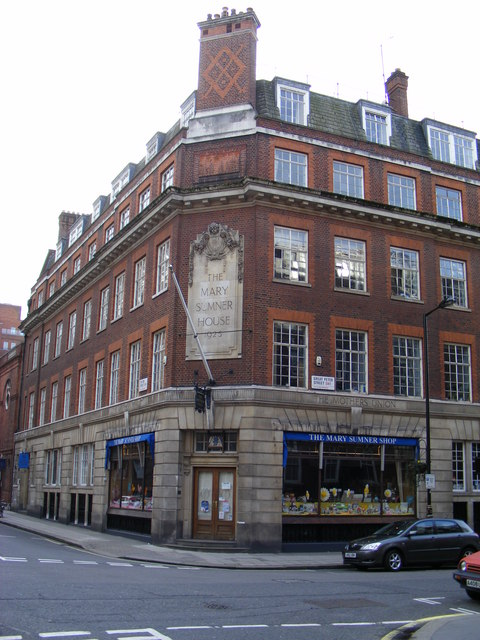
Mary Sumner House, Mothers Union HQ, London

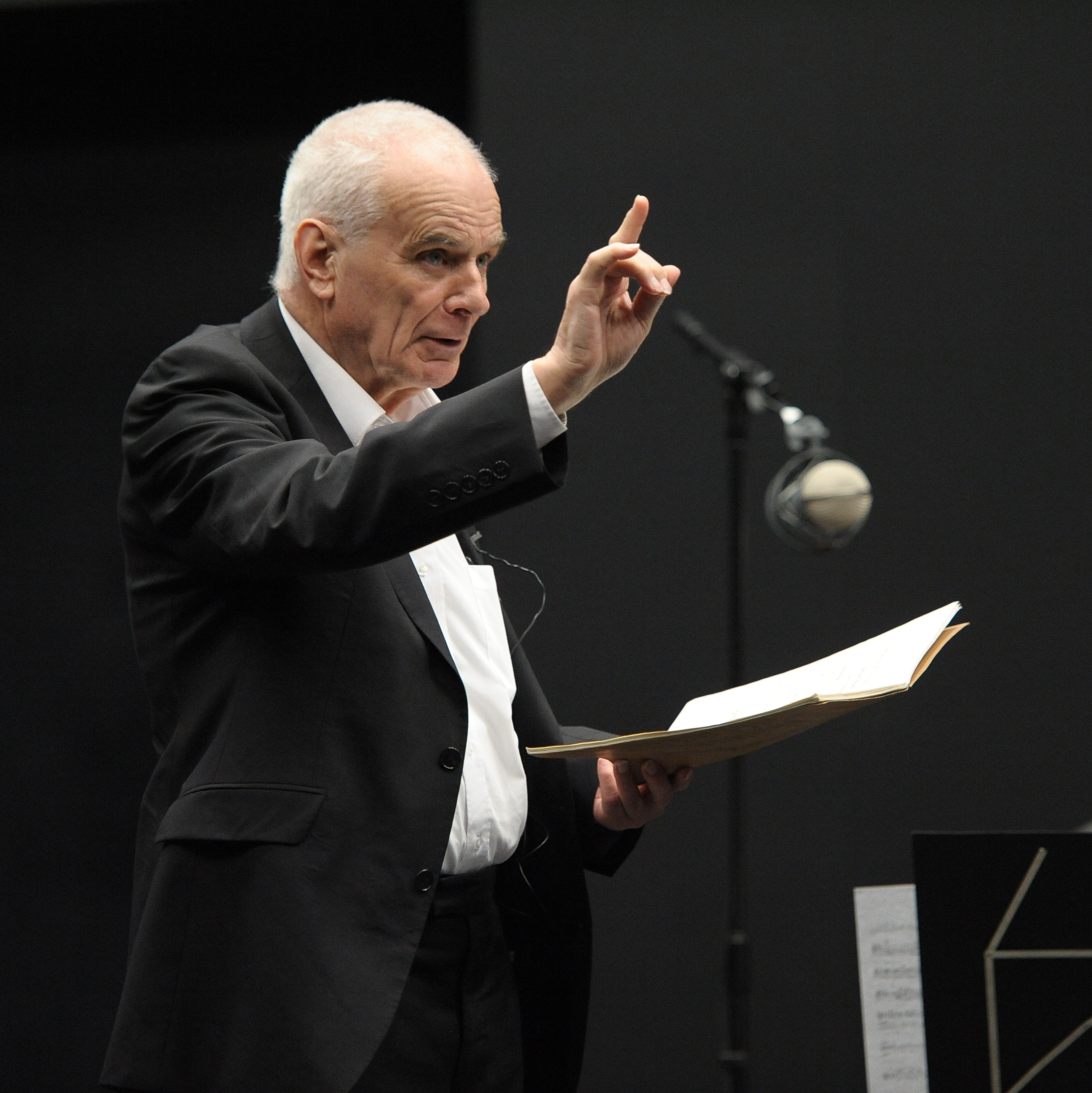
Sir Peter Maxwell Davies, 2012

- Mary Sumner (1828–1921), founder of the Mothers' Union
- Venerable Percy Bowers (1856–1922), an Anglican priest and Archdeacon of Loughborough, 1921–1922
- Gertrude Lilian Entwisle (1892–1961), an electrical engineer who broke "the barriers of prejudice to become a respected designer of electrical rotating machinery."
- Leslie Cussons (1907–1963), Chairman of Cussons Sons & Co, which manufactures Cussons Imperial Leather.
- Sir Peter Maxwell Davies (1934–2016), composer, previously Master of the Queen's Music, was brought up in Swinton after his family moved from Salford when he was four. In 1998, he wrote Swinton Jig, an orchestral work inspired by the sounds and traditional melodies heard in Swinton during his childhood.
- Tony Warren (1936–2016), TV screenwriter and actor; he created the ITV soap opera Coronation Street.
- Eric Idle (born 1943), actor, comedian, songwriter, musician, screenwriter and playwright; brought up locally.
- Roger Smalley (1943–2015), composer, pianist and conductor.
- Fiona Hall (born 1955) politician, Member of the European Parliament for North East England, 2009–2014.
- Mollie Gallagher (born 1997), actress, portrayed Nina Lucas in Coronation Street.

=== Sport ===
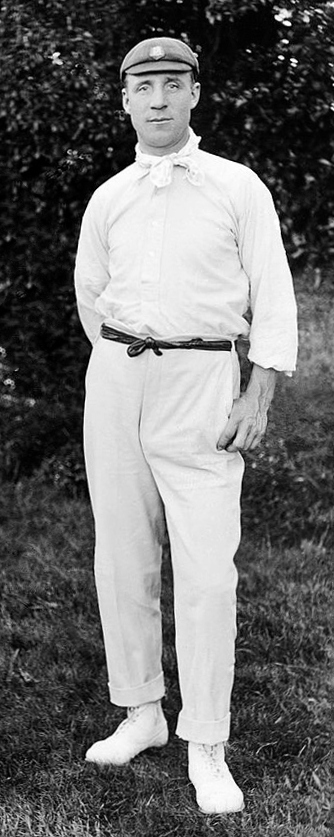
Crowther Charlesworth, 1905

- Crowther Charlesworth (1875–1953), cricketer, played 372 First-class cricket matches
- Bryn Evans (1899–1975), rugby league footballer, played 464 games for Swinton Lions
- Geoff Pullar (1935–2014), cricketer, who played 400 First-class cricket matches and 28 Test cricket matches
- Alf Meakin (born 1938), track and field athlete (mainly sprinting) and rugby league footballer
- Graham Williams (1944–1994), a rugby league footballer, played 264 games including 179 for Swinton Lions
- Derek Whitehead (1944–2025), rugby league footballer, played 422 games including 274 for Warrington Wolves
- Dave Robinson (1944–2022), rugby league footballer, played 177 games for Swinton Lions & 143 for Wigan Warriors
- Giant Haystacks (1946–1998), professional wrestler, real name Martin Austin Ruane, brought up and lived locally
- Tony Morrin (1946–2020), footballer who played over 350 games including 182 for Exeter City
- Christine Benning (born 1955), middle-distance runner, silver medallist in the 1500 m. at the 1978 Commonwealth Games
- Ian Blease (born 1965), rugby league footballer, played 252 games for Salford Red Devils
- Dean Holden (born 1979), manager and footballer, who played 369 games including 85 for Oldham Athletic
- Ashley Grimes (born 1986), footballer, played 232 games including 74 for Rochdale

== See also ==
- Listed buildings in Swinton and Pendlebury
- Victoria Park, Swinton
