= Municipal Borough of Swinton and Pendlebury =

Former local government area in the UK

Coordinates: 53°31′N 2°19′W

Swinton and Pendlebury
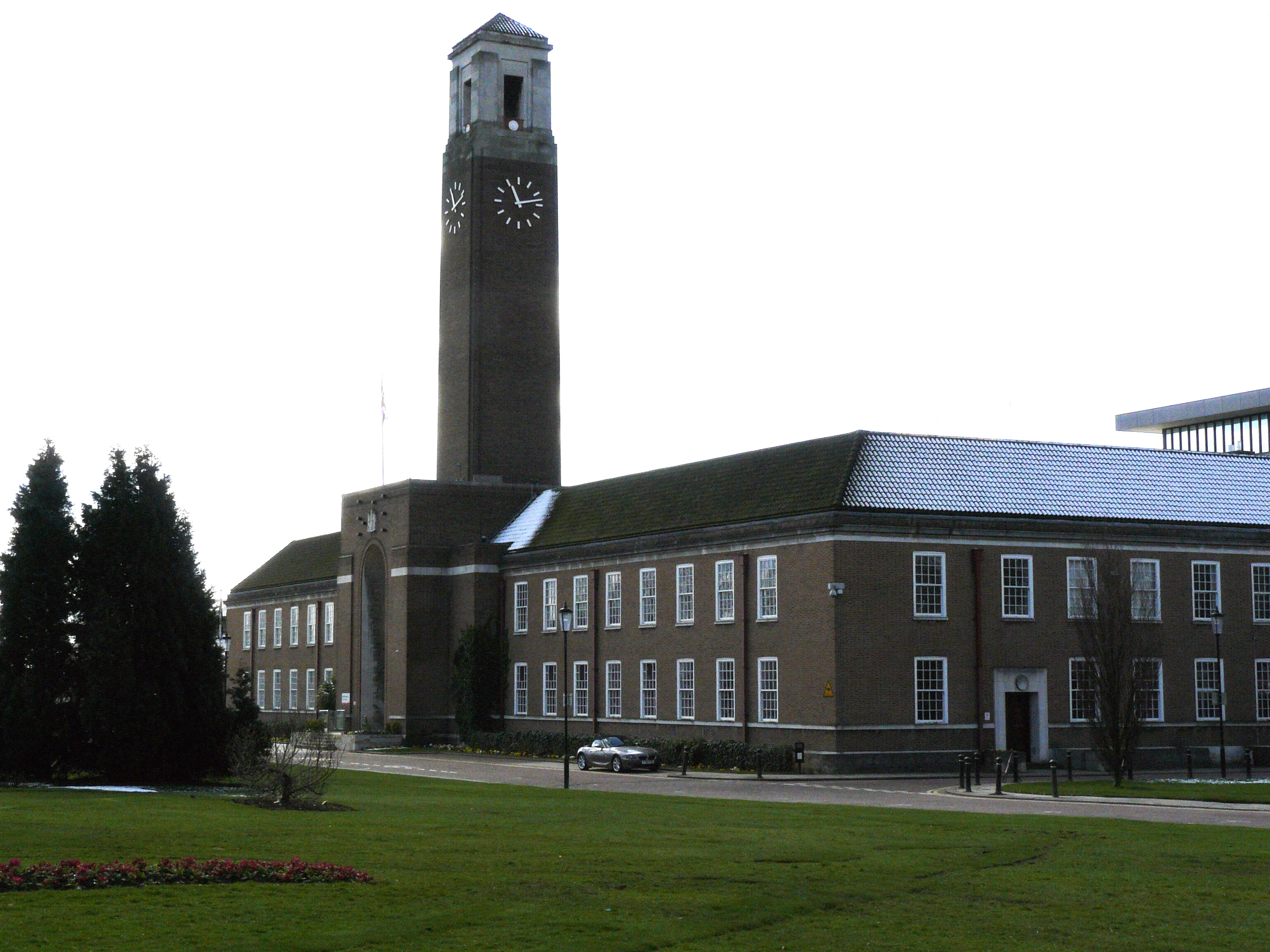
- Swinton and Pendlebury Town Hall
- Area
  - 1901: 2,284 acres (9.24 km^{2})
  - 1971: 3,362 acres (13.69 km^{2})
- Population
  - 1901: 27,005
  - 1971: 40,166
- History
  - Created: 1894
  - Abolished: 1974
  - Succeeded by: City of Salford
- Status: Urban district (1894-1934); Municipal borough and civil parish (after 1934)
  - HQ: Swinton
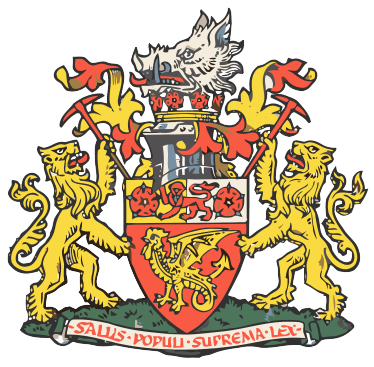

Swinton and Pendlebury was a local government district of the administrative county of Lancashire, England. It was created in 1894 as an urban district and enlarged in 1934, gaining the status of a municipal borough.

Before the new town hall was built to accommodate the new municipal borough in the 1930s, the urban district was governed from Pendlebury Town Hall on Bolton Road at the junction with Carrington Street. This building eventually became the town's main public library and was used as such until a new library was opened within the newly built Lancastrian Hall on Chorley Road, Swinton at the junction with Station Road (B5231).

== Constituent civil parishes ==
It was created as an urban district in 1894 by the Local Government Act 1894, consisting of the civil parishes of Swinton and Pendlebury. When Barton-upon-Irwell Rural District was abolished in 1933 Swinton and Pendlebury gained part of the Clifton parish (an area of 1,052 acres (4.26 km^{2})). In 1934 Swinton parish and Pendlebury parish were abolished and their former area was merged with that of the former Clifton parish to form a combined Swinton and Pendlebury parish which was coterminous with the urban district boundaries.

The municipal borough was abolished in 1974 by the Local Government Act 1972. Its former area was used to form part of the present-day City of Salford metropolitan borough in the Greater Manchester metropolitan county. Swinton and Pendlebury Town Hall is currently used by Salford City Council as the Salford Civic Centre.
