= Christopher Walton =

English businessman and writer

Christopher Walton (1809 – 11 October 1877) was an English businessman, known as a writer on theosophy.

== Life ==
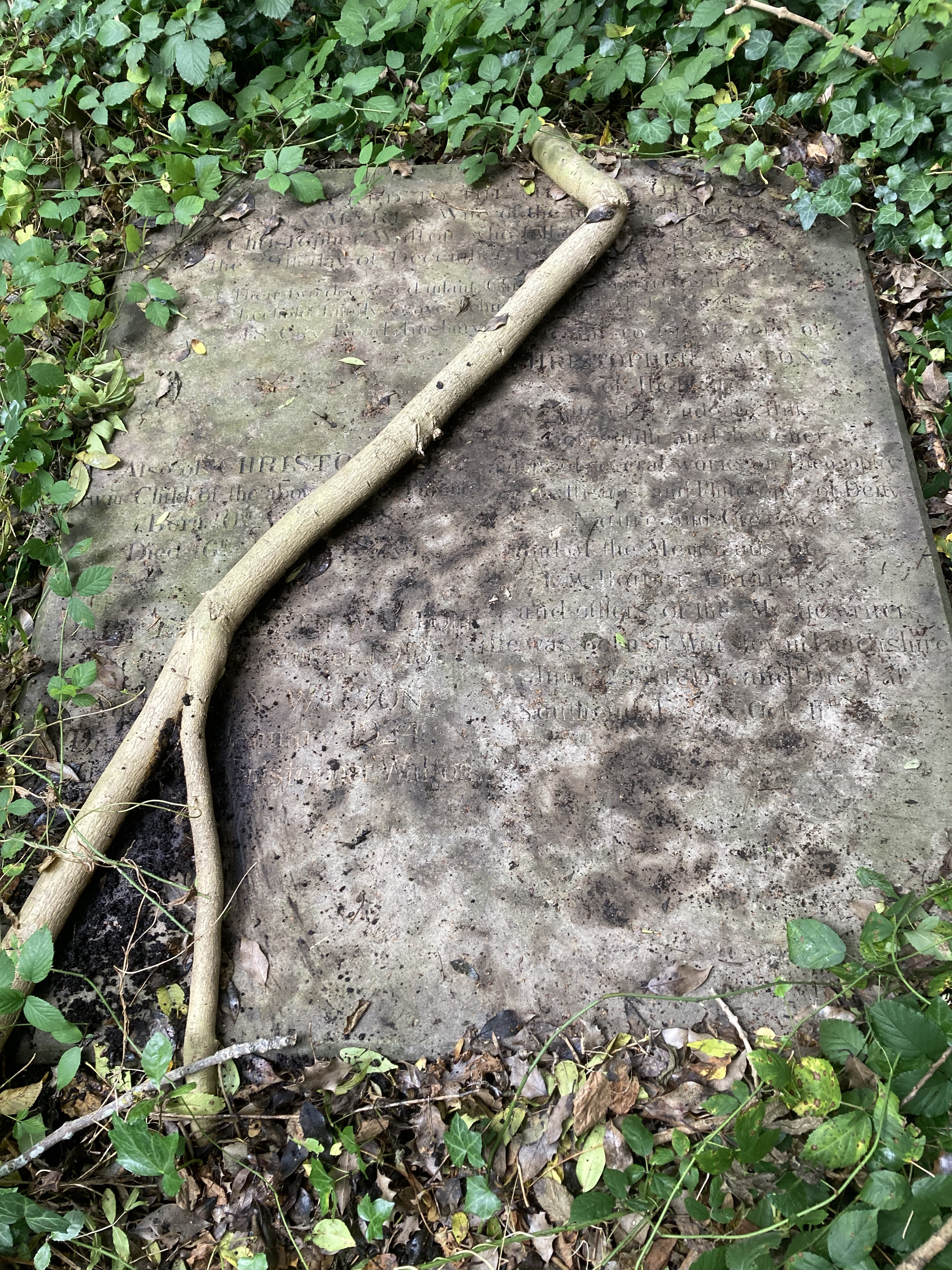
Family grave of Christopher Walton in Highgate Cemetery

The son of John and Hannah Walton, he was born at Worsley, Lancashire, in June 1809, and was educated by Jonathan Crowther. He came to London in 1830, having served his time in a Manchester warehouse. After gaining some experience abroad, he began business as a silk-mercer. Ultimately he made a fortune as a jeweller and goldsmith on Ludgate Hill, remaining in business till 1875.

Walton died on 11 October 1877 at 16 Cambridge Terrace, Southend-on-Sea, and was buried on the western side of Highgate cemetery on 15 October.

== Methodism and mysticism ==
Walton was a Wesleyan Methodist. For many years (from 1839) he was one of the secretaries to the Strangers' Friend Society; its reports 1844 and 1845 are his. Through the specimens in Wesley's Christian Library he was introduced to the writings of William Law; Law led him to Jacob Boehme, and he found a key to Boehme in the diagrams of Dionysius Andrew Freher. His interest in theosophical writings of this class was widened by acquaintance with James Pierrepont Greaves. He was attracted too by the type of devout mysticism presented in James Sigston's Life (1839) of William Bramwell.

Walton became a collector of the writings, in print or in manuscript, of mystics, keeping most of his books in what he termed his "Theosophian Library" on his premises at 8 Ludgate Hill. In 1875, he deposited nearly the whole of his collection with Dr. Williams's Library, then in Grafton Street, stipulating that it should be kept apart as the "Walton Theosophical Library", and be open to students.

== Works ==
Walton was the biographer of William Law, author of the Serious Call. About 1845 he advertised for an assistant in the task. He also began to print in November 1847 An Outline of the Qualifications … for the Biography of … Law; it was completed at Christmas 1853. The work is a disorderly collection of biographical and bibliographical information.

He printed also an Introduction to Theosophy (vol. i. 1854); it was intended to reach thirty volumes, but only part was published. Other anonymous publications on theosophy were probably written at Walton's suggestion and printed at his cost. He had prepared a vast number of theosophic diagrams of his own invention on Freher's pattern.

== Legacy ==
The Walton Theosophical Library of about 1,000 volumes became part of Dr Williams's Library.

== Family ==
Walton was twice married. By his first wife, Anna Maria Pickford (died 1863) of Bristol, he had two sons and three daughters. On the death of his son Christopher he adopted a son, to whom he gave his own name. By his second wife, who survived him, he had one daughter.
