= Listed buildings in Worsley =

Worsley is a town in the City of Salford Metropolitan Borough, Greater Manchester, England. The town, together with the areas of Walkden and Little Hulton, contains 56 listed buildings that are recorded in the National Heritage List for England. Of these, two are listed at Grade I, the highest of the three grades, and the others are at Grade II, the lowest grade.

Worsley was an ancient manor, and coal was mined there from the 14th century. In the 18th century, the 3rd Duke of Bridgewater introduced a canal system to transport the coal to Manchester, which developed into the Bridgewater Canal. The earlier listed buildings are houses and other structures in the manor. Many of the later listed buildings are associated with the coal mine and canal system, and are houses and other buildings that later developed as a result of it.

== Key ==
Grade	Criteria
I	Buildings of exceptional interest, sometimes considered to be internationally important
II	Buildings of national importance and special interest

== Buildings ==
Name and location	Photograph	Date	Notes	Grade
Wardley Hall; 53.51590°N 2.36697°W		c. 1500	A country house that has subsequently been altered, including a restoration in 1894 by Douglas and Fordham. It is basically timber framed on a stone plinth, with a stone-slate roof, and the rebuilding has been in brick with stone dressings. It has a courtyard plan, the south range having five bays, with projecting east and west wings, and a two-storey gabled bay window. The windows are mullioned or mullioned and transomed.	I
Worsley Old Hall; 53.50539°N 2.39083°W		16th or 17th century (probable)	The hall has been considerably altered and extended on a number of occasions, and later converted into a restaurant. It is in brick, mainly rendered, and timber framing, with roofs of slate and stone-slate, and has two storeys. The south range has six bays, with a 19th-century porch, and at the end is 17th-century timber framed bay on a stone plinth, with mullioned and transomed windows, a jettied upper floor, and a gable. Elsewhere there are similar windows and timber framed bays.	II
Kempnough Hall; 53.50988°N 2.38406°W	—	17th century	The house possibly contains earlier material, it was altered and rebuilt in the 19th century, and has been divided into three dwellings. The building is timber framed with a slate roof, and has an H-shaped plan, with a central range and cross-wings, and a rear wing. It has two storeys and a total of five bays. In the central range is a 19th-century porch and casement windows. The left wing is rendered. The right wing projects further and probably contains the oldest material. The upper floor is jettied but hidden behind a brick wall, and the gable is also jettied but is behind boarding. On the upper floor is a mullioned window.	II
Parrfold Farmhouse; 53.51511°N 2.40005°W	—	Late 17th or early 18th century	The house was altered and extended in 1853. It is in brick with traces of stone quoins, and has a clay tile roof with a coped gable. There are two storeys, three bays, and extensions at the rear. In the centre is a gabled porch with a Tudor arched opening. The windows have been altered, many of them 20th-century casements.	II
340, 341 and 342 Parr Fold; 53.51553°N 2.40090°W	—	1715	A row of three houses that were considerably rebuilt in the mid-19th century. They are in brick with stone quoins and have a stone-slate roof, half-hipped to the right. There are two storeys, three bays, and a cross-wing forming a T-shaped plan. The first bay has a stone plinth, a timber framed gable, a jettied upper floor, and a mullioned and transomed window. In the other bays are porches, mullioned windows with hood moulds, and gables with ornate finials. At the rear are casement windows and dormers.	II
337, 338 and 339 Parr Fold; 53.51536°N 2.40073°W	—	1722	Originally one house that was considerably rebuilt in the mid-19th century, and divided into two houses and two cottages. It is in brick with a slate roof, and consists of a two-storey house with two bays, a wing and outshut at the rear, an extension to the right, and single-storey cottages with attics to the left. The house has a central doorway with a datestone above, and casement windows. The cottages have a porch, mullioned windows with hood moulds, and gabled dormer windows.	II
St Mary the Virgin's Church, Ellenbrook; 53.51015°N 2.41394°W		1725	The church was extended to the east in the late 18th century, the chancel, porch, baptistry and south aisle were added in 1842, and the vestry in the 20th century. It is in brick with a slate roof, and consists of a nave with a gabled north porch, a chancel, and a polygonal west baptistry. On the roof is a 19th-century bellcote, the windows on the sides have segmental heads, and at the end are three lancet windows.	II
3 Worsley Road; 53.50033°N 2.38081°W		Early 18th century	A house and shop in rendered stone with stone dressings and a stone-slate roof with coped gables and finials. It has three storeys and fronts of three and two bays. There are two casement windows, and the other windows are mullioned.	II
Booth's Hall; 53.50011°N 2.41534°W	—	Early 18th century	A brick house on a projecting plinth with an eaves cornice and a stone-slate roof. There are three storeys and a symmetrical front of three bays. The central doorway has a gabled canopy, and the windows in the front are casement windows. Elsewhere there are casement, sash, and bay windows, and on the sides are three gables.	II
Hazelhurst Hall Farmhouse; 53.50755°N 2.36249°W	—	Early 18th century	Originally the cross-wing of a house that has been demolished, it is in brick, partly rendered, with a slate roof. The house has a double-depth plan, three storeys and an attic, and two bays.	II
Littlewood, Sisley and stable block 53.51079°N 2.38457°W	—	c. 1740	A house that was extended, mainly in the 19th century, first with a gabled wing to the left, and then with a parallel range at the rear. It is in brick with a slate roof and two storeys. The original part has three bays and contains replacement casement windows. The rear range is taller, and the extensions contain a mix of mullioned and transomed casement windows and sash windows. The stable block has an arched entrance.	II
10, 12 and 14 Worsley Road; 53.50032°N 2.37945°W		Mid-18th century	A row of three houses in pebbledashed brick with a slate roof. They have a double-depth plan, three storeys and one bay each. The windows are replacement casements with segmental heads.	II
Ivy Cottage; 53.50029°N 2.38015°W	—	Mid-18th century	A house in roughcast brick with a slate roof and an L-shaped plan. It has two storeys with a front facing the road of two bays. The central doorway has a canopy and the windows are sashes. Above the left bay is a coped parapet, and over the right bay is a coped gable. In the right return are casement windows and a dormer.	II
Sundial shaft 53.51566°N 2.36644°W	—	18th century	The shaft of a former sundial in the grounds of Wardley Hall is in stone. It consists of a bulbous baluster with a moulded head and base. On it is a table top, replacing the dial.	II
2 and 3 The Delph; 53.50123°N 2.38088°W		c. 1760	Originally a house incorporating a stonemason's workshop, later extended into two houses, they are in stone with quoins and a slate roof. The houses have two storeys, 20th-century porches, casement windows in square-cut surrounds, and there is a blocked elliptical-arch opening in the right return.	II
Bridge over branches of Bridgewater Canal; 53.50053°N 2.38103°W		c. 1760	The bridge carries Worsley Road over branches of the Bridgewater Canal, and has since been rebuilt and enlarged. It is in stone and brick. From the east it has a semicircular brick arch, then a blind segmental arch, and two similar arches, one blind and one open. The parapet is either is stone or brick with round-topped stone coping or with iron railings.	II
Eastern tunnel entrance to underground canal 53.50113°N 2.38101°W		c. 1760	The eastern entrance to the canal, designed by James Brindley, is a segmental arch hewn out of rock with a brick lining. The tunnel entrance is also part of a Scheduled Monument.	II
Sluice gate at east entrance to mine canal tunnel 53.50105°N 2.38095°W		c. 1760	The sluice gate was designed by James Brindley, and is at the east entrance to the canal leading from the coal mines. It enabled boats to leave the canal by producing a surge of water. It is composed of timber and cast iron, and has been much altered. The sluice gate is also part of a Scheduled Monument.	II
Sluice gate at west entrance to mine canal tunnel 53.50101°N 2.38134°W		c. 1760	The sluice gate was designed by James Brindley, and is at the west entrance to the canal leading from the coal mines. It enabled boats to leave the canal by producing a surge of water. It is composed of timber and cast iron, and has been much altered. The sluice gate is also part of a Scheduled Monument.	II
Western tunnel entrance to underground canal 53.50106°N 2.38137°W	—	c. 1760	The western entrance to the canal, designed by James Brindley, is a segmental arch hewn out of rock with a brick lining. The tunnel entrance is also part of a Scheduled Monument.	II
Dry docks 53.49849°N 2.37843°W	—	c. 1761	The dry docks were built for the Bridgewater Canal by John Gilbert and James Brindley. They have stone retaining walls, wooden sluice gates, sheds in timber and concrete, and open side walls.	II
11–19 The Crescent and garden walls 53.49936°N 2.37557°W	—	1760s	A terrace of five houses in rendered brick with a stone-slate roof. They have two storeys, two bays each, and additions at the rear. Each house has an off-centre door, some also have porches, and the windows are casements with segmental heads. The front gardens have stone walls with round-topped copings.	II
23 The Crescent and garden wall 53.49947°N 2.37507°W		1760s	A house in rendered brick with a slate roof, two storeys, two bays, and a small rear wing. The off-centre door has a gabled canopy, and the windows are replacement casements. In front is a stone garden wall.	II
Bramble Cottage and garden wall 53.49944°N 2.37520°W	—	1760s	A house in rendered brick with a slate roof, two storeys and two bays. The off-centre door has a gabled canopy, and the windows are casements, one with a segmental head. In front is a stone garden wall.	II
Hewitt family tomb 53.53143°N 2.42631°W	—	c. 1768	The tomb is in the churchyard of St Paul's Church. It is a chest tomb in stone and is decorated with Classical motifs. The inscription gives details of the members of the Hewitt family of Peel Hall buried in the grave.	II
Jetty steps outside the Packet House; 53.49982°N 2.38112°W		c. 1769 (probable)	Nine long stone steps, curving at one end, they were used for boarding boats on the Bridgewater Canal.	II
Rock House; 53.50018°N 2.38132°W		Late 18th century	A brick house with a slate roof, a double-depth plan, two storeys and a symmetrical front of three bays. The central doorway is flanked by Tuscan columns, above the door is a decorative elliptical fanlight, and the windows are sashes.	II
10–16 Barton Road; 53.49929°N 2.38093°W		c. 1800	A row of four houses in rendered brick with a stone eaves cornice and a slate roof. They have two storeys, and each house has two bays, a rear wing, a central doorway and two casement windows in each floor.	II
Boat-house; 53.49925°N 2.37990°W		Early 19th century	The boat-house is a long narrow brick building with a slate roof, and at the canal end is an elliptical arch containing double timber gates. The arch has an embattled parapet and stepped sides. The boat-house was used to house the royal barge during Queen Victoria's visit in 1851.	II
Garden Cottage; 53.49976°N 2.40053°W		1834	The cottage in the grounds of Worsley New Hall is in stone with quoins, a slate roof, and additions in brick, and is in Gothic style. It has an L-shaped plan, two storeys, three bays, and a three-storey octagonal tower with a conical swept roof at the external angle. The first bay has a coped gable with a finial. In the second bay is a gabled porch with its Tudor arched doorway converted into a window. The other windows are mullioned, many with hood moulds.	II
The Bothy; 53.50040°N 2.39880°W		Early 1840s	Designed by Edward Blore, this was a boiler house and gardener's dormitory in the grounds of Worsley New Hall. It is in Hollington sandstone and red brick, and has a slate roof, a single storey, and a T-shaped plan. To the south is a square chimney.	II
Ice house, Worsley New Hall; 53.50282°N 2.39311°W	—	1840s	The ice house is in the grounds of the former Worsley New Hall, now demolished. It is in stone with a brick interior with a segmental vaulted structure.	II
St Mark's Church, Worsley; 53.50236°N 2.38495°W		1845–46	The church was designed by George Gilbert Scott in Gothic Revival style for Francis Egerton, and the north aisle was added in 1851. It is in stone with roofs of slate and copper, and consists of a nave with clerestory, north and south aisles, a chancel with a chapel, vestry and organ chamber, and a west steeple. The steeple has a four-stage tower that has buttresses with gablets, a west door, a three-light west window, clock faces, a dog-tooth eaves band with gargoyles, and spire with flying buttresses, and gabled lucarnes with crockets and gargoyles.	I
St Paul's Church, Walkden; 53.52342°N 2.39531°W		1848	The north aisle was added in 1881–82, and the church was restored in 1904. It is in Gothic Revival style, built in stone, and it has a roof of slate and clay tile with coped gables and cross finials. The church consists of a nave with a clerestory, north and south aisles, a chancel, and a southwest tower. The tower has three stages, a south door, angle buttresses, an octagonal stair turret, clock faces, a corbel table, a coped parapet, and a small pyramidal roof. The window on the sides of the aisles are lancets, and in the clerestory they are quatrefoils.	II
The Aviary; 53.50342°N 2.37454°W		1848–49	This was built as a hunting and fishing lodge for the 1st Earl of Ellesmere, and was greatly extended in 1995. It has a ground floor in pebbledashed brick with timber framing above, and roofs of slate, clay tiles, and stone-slate. There are two storeys and fronts of three and four bays. On the corner is a tower with jettied gables and a cupola with a weathervane.	II
Worsley Court House; 53.50020°N 2.38187°W		1849	Wings were added to the sides of the court house in 1896, and it has since been used for other functions. The building is timber framed on a projecting stone plinth, and has a single storey. In the centre is a large hall which is flanked by lower projecting side wings, all of which are gabled. Between the wings is a porch with a loggia and a balustrade, and the doorway has a Tudor arched head. The windows are mullioned, some also have transoms, and the gables have decorative bargeboards and finials. On both sides are oriel windows, and on the right side is a chimney topped by a tower-like feature and a pyramidal roof.	II
Entrance gates and walls, Worsley New Hall; 53.50285°N 2.38853°W		c. 1850	The gates were designed by Edward Blore. They are in cast and wrought iron, and consist of double carriage gates flanked by pedestrian gates. They have elaborate scrollwork, and at the top is a Baroque-type head and the outline of a cartouche. The gates are flanked by ashlar piers and pierced quadrant walls.	II
Beesley Hall; 53.50995°N 2.38216°W	—	Mid-19th century	The previous hall was rebuilt and converted into three houses. It is in brick with applied timber framing, and has a roof of slate and stone-slate. There are two storeys and a symmetrical front of six bays. The second and fifth bays project forward under gables and have two storeys; the other bays have one storey and an attic. The windows are casements, there are dormer windows and one later bow window. At the rear is a central gable and two gabled dormers.	II
Ice house, Peel Hall; 53.52724°N 2.42693°W	—	Mid-19th century	The ice house is in the grounds of the former Peel Hall, now demolished. It has a brick vaulted entrance leading to a domed chamber about 4 metres (13 ft) in diameter.	II
The Packet House; 53.49991°N 2.38122°W		19th century	A group of houses with an irregular plan, two, three and four storeys, and four bays. All the windows are mullioned. The first two bays are in brick with a slate roof, and the second bay has a coped gable. The other bays are timber framed with a stone-slate roof. The third bay has a doorway with a moulded surround, and a gabled dormer. The right bay is larger consisting of a projecting four-storey cross-wing. The upper floors and the gable are all jettied, and the gable has decorative bargeboards and a finial.	II
The Old Nick; 53.49933°N 2.38133°W		1851	Originally a police house, later a private house, it is timber framed with a stone-slate roof. It has a T-shaped plan, two storeys and three bays, the third bay a gabled cross-wing. On the front is a gabled porch with decorative bargeboards and a finial, and in the second bay is a gabled dormer. The windows are mullioned or mullioned and transomed. On the right return is a two-storey porch with a jettied upper floor on scroll brackets.	II
Former Oil Store; 53.49960°N 2.38045°W		1852	The purpose of the building was to store oil and powder for use on the canal and mines. It was converted for residential use in 1986, when wings were added to the rear, and openings were created. The building is in brick with stone dressings, and has a slate roof with coped gables and finials. It has two storeys and seven bays, segmental openings on the ground floor and three-light windows above. In the right gable end is an oriel window and a datestone.	II
Drywood Hall; 53.50104°N 2.37176°W	—	1855	A country house, later part of a school, it is timber framed with a roof of slate and stone-slate. There are two storeys, six bays, and rear wings. The front is asymmetrical, and its features include a two-storey porch, gables and gabled dormers. The windows are mullioned or mullioned and the porch gable has a decorative panel including a coat of arms.	II
Ellesmere Memorial and railings, Worsley; 53.50361°N 2.40017°W		1859	The memorial commemorates Francis Egerton, 1st Earl of Ellesmere, and has since been reduced in height. It is in ashlar stone, and decorated with a band of Mintons encaustic tiles and with serpentine. In Gothic style, it consists of two stages with crocketed gables and gabled angle buttresses, on which is an octagonal column and an octagonal spire. The memorial is surrounded by iron railings with ornamental finials.	II
Ellesmere Memorial, Walkden; 53.52339°N 2.39640°W		1868	The memorial commemorates Harriet, the widow of Francis Egerton, 1st Earl of Ellesmere. It is in stone, and consists of a tabernacle with a tall, elaborately decorated pinnacle in Gothic style. There are four aches on a plinth, with crocketed gables and corner pinnacles, and within the arches is a short column. Above are niches containing statues of personifications of charities, and on the top are gablets on columns and a cross finial.	II
The Ellesmere public house 53.51852°N 2.39690°W		1860s or 1870s	The former public house is on a corner site. It is in stone on a projecting plinth and has a slate roof, two storeys, and sides of three and four bays. The windows are mullioned with sashes, and on the upper floor they have round-arched heads, colonettes and hood moulds. The doorway has a fanlight and a gable, and above it is a coat of arms. The corner is canted and on the upper floor is a polygonal oriel window. On the side are two gabled dormer windows with finials.	II
St Paul's Church, Peel; 53.53096°N 2.42600°W		1874–76	The church was designed by J. Medland and Henry Taylor in Gothic Revival style with Decorated features, and the spire was added in 1897. The church is in stone on a projecting plinth with a slate roof, and consists of a nave, north and south aisles under separate roofs, a north porch, a taller chancel, and a west steeple. The steeple has a four-stage tower with angled buttresses, a west door, a four-light west window, a parapet, and a broach spire with lucarnes set back behind it. There is a bellcote on the chancel roof, and inside the church is a hammerbeam roof.	II
St John's Church, Walkden; 53.53058°N 2.40109°W		1876	The church, designed by J. Medland and Henry Taylor in Gothic Revival style, is in stone with a slate roof. It consists of a nave, a porch and baptistry, a chancel with a polygonal apse, a north chapel, and a transeptal vestry and organ chamber, and a steeple at the crossing. The steeple consists of a square tower rising to octagonal by broaches, with a square stair turret, and a broach spire with lucarnes. The windows are lancets.	II
Fountain; 53.49903°N 2.37853°W		1905	The fountain on Worsley Green is a memorial to the 3rd Duke of Bridgewater and was erected by the 3rd Earl of Ellesmere, re-using some of the bricks from the Duke's factory formerly on the site. It contains a carved bowl on a scrolled pedestal on a platform of four steps. This is surrounded by a brick superstructure with an arched opening on each side and an entablature with a frieze, a cornice, and a pierced parapet. On one of the steps is an inscription.	II
140–145 The Green; 53.49880°N 2.37787°W		c. 1907	A row of six houses in brick with applied timber framing and a clay tile roof. They have two storeys and a symmetrical front of 13 bays. There are four gables with decorative bargeboards and finials, the outer bays projecting forward, and in the centre is a dormer window. The windows are mullioned and some also have transoms.	II
146–149 The Green; 53.49879°N 2.37721°W	—	c. 1907	A row of four rendered brick houses with clay roofs. They have two storeys with attics, and each has one gabled bay. On the ground floor of each house is a doorway, a buttress, and a square three-light bay window. The upper floor is jettied and each house contains a three-light mullioned and transomed window, and there is a small two-light window in the gable.	II
150–153 The Green; 53.49881°N 2.37672°W	—	c. 1907	A row of four stone houses with applied timber framing on the upper floor and stone-slate roofs. They have two storeys and one bay each. The outer bays project forward as gabled cross-wings, and both of the houses in the inner bays has a gabled oriel-dormer window. All the windows are mullioned. The upper parts of the gables are shingled and have decorative bargeboards and finials.	II
Footbridge; 53.49870°N 2.37948°W		c. 1907	The footbridge crosses the Bridgewater Canal linking Barton Road and The Green. It is in wrought iron with stone abutments, and consists of a single segmental arch. The bridge has a cobbled deck, and cast iron posts supporting the railings. The abutments have triangular passing places, and terminal piers and coping stones.	II
Worsley war memorial 53.50230°N 2.38520°W	—	1922	The war memorial is in the churchyard of St Mark's Church. It is in Cornish granite and consists of a cross fleury on a tapering octagonal shaft. This stands on an octagonal plinth on a base of three steps. The plinth has a moulded base and cap and carries an inscription and the names of those lost in the First World War.	II
Boothstown Lancashire Mines Rescue Station; 53.50544°N 2.41156°W		1932–33	The centre was designed by Bradshaw Gass & Hope, and is in brick with ashlar copings and a hipped tile roof. There are two storeys, and the front facing the road has seven bays, with the outer two bays on each side projecting forward and with a glazed canopy between them. The outer bays contain four-light transomed windows and have coped parapets with end finials. The central bays have garage doors, and dormers on the roof. Behind are a garage, training galleries and observation halls.	II
K6 telephone kiosk 53.50045°N 2.38057°W		1935	A K6 type telephone kiosk, designed by Giles Gilbert Scott. Constructed in cast iron with a square plan and a dome, it has three unperforated crowns in the top panels.	II
