= Worsley Old Hall =

Listed pub and restaurant in Greater Manchester, England

- The building in 2017

General information
- Location: Worsley, Greater Manchester, England
- Coordinates: 53°30′19″N 2°23′28″W
- Completed: 16th or early 17th century
- Renovated: 1855, 1891 and 1906 (extended and rebuilt); 20th century (altered)

Technical details
- Floor count: 2 + cellar

Design and construction
- Designations

Listed Building – Grade II
- Official name: Worsley Old Hall
- Designated: 29 July 1966
- Reference no.: 1288296

Website
- Official website

Worsley Old Hall is a Grade II listed building in Worsley, a village in the City of Salford, Greater Manchester, England. The present structure dates from the 16th or early 17th century and began as a timber‑framed house later rebuilt in brick and altered over several centuries. It was remodelled in the 18th century and extended in the mid‑19th and early 20th centuries. The hall is historically notable as the place where Francis Egerton, James Brindley and John Gilbert planned the Bridgewater Canal. Converted to restaurant use in the late 20th century, it now operates as a public house and dining venue.

== History ==
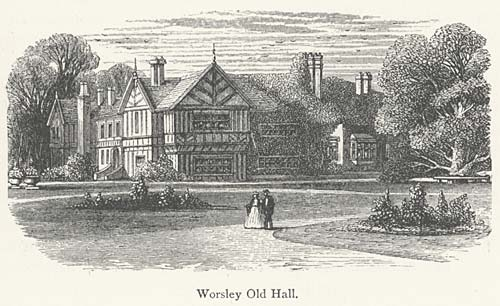
Worsley Old Hall

The present building dates from the 16th or early 17th century. It began as a timber-framed house and was later rebuilt in brick. It is thought to have consisted originally of a hall range on the south side with wings projecting northwards to the east and west. The house was remodelled in the 18th century through the addition of a range immediately north of the hall. The hall is of particular historical interest as the place where Francis Egerton, the 3rd Duke of Bridgewater, James Brindley and John Gilbert planned the Bridgewater Canal and oversaw its construction.

The building was substantially extended around 1855 when the east wing was enlarged. Further alterations followed in 1891, and in 1905 the space between the wings was infilled with a billiard room containing a table supplied by Orme and Sons. A small wing was added on the northwest side in 1906.

On 29 July 1966, Worsley Old Hall was designated a Grade II listed building. Additional internal changes were made during the 20th century, particularly in the 1990s when it was converted into a restaurant.

By 2011 the building was operating as a public house and restaurant within the Brewers Fayre chain. It was sold in August 2013 and, following refurbishment, reopened in December 2013 as a food-led real ale pub run by Brunning & Price.

== Architecture ==
=== Exterior ===
The building is mainly brick, much of it covered with render, with later additions that include some 19th‑century timber work and a mix of stone‑slate and slate roofs. The main section has six bays and two storeys, with further rooms added at the back. The rendered front includes a 19th‑century porch and a doorway in the fourth bay. Two brick chimney stacks project from the front, each with shafts set at an angle. At the upper end of the hall, the seventh bay contains a 17th‑century two‑storey gabled projection. This part is timber‑framed, with shaped corner posts, matching three‑light windows on both floors, and carved supports beneath the overhanging upper storey. The gable has a curved outline. The remaining bays have three or four‑light windows, many still with their original glazing bars.

The right‑hand side also shows early timber framing, and this continues into a 19th‑century wing at the rear, which has an upper floor that projects above a stone bay window. Additional 19th and 20th‑century extensions stand to the left and behind, one or two storeys in height. The rear is mostly rendered and has a mixture of casement and sash windows.

=== Interior ===
Inside, the hall contains beams carried on posts that rise through both floors. These beams and posts have shaped edges and form part of the original timber structure. The form of the first‑floor ceiling suggests the roof once had notable curved trusses. The first‑floor rooms include a fireplace with a shaped surround and timber overmantel, along with 17th‑century oak panelling with raised mouldings. There is also a brick‑vaulted cellar. Some older fittings are said to have been brought from Hulme Hall after it was demolished. Interior details from the 19th century also survive and add interest.

== See also ==
- Listed buildings in Worsley
- Listed pubs in Greater Manchester
- Worsley New Hall, a former mansion, demolished between 1946 and 1949
