= Ann Cutler =

- Born: 1759; Thornley-with-Wheatley; Kingdom of Great Britain
- Died: 29 December 1794 (aged 34–35); Macclesfield

Ann Cutler (1759 – 29 December 1794) was a British hand-loom weaver and Methodist evangelist.

== Life ==
Cutler was born in the Lancashire parish of Thornley-with-Wheatley in 1759. Her parents and schooling are unknown, but she became a hand loom weaver. She came to notice in 1785 when she converted from established Christianity to Methodism by William Bramwell.

Cutler was with Hester Rogers one of the first women preachers. Their devotion laid the foundation for friends Sarah Crosby and Mary Bosanquet Fletcher to later become Methodist preachers. Cutler had met the Methodist leader, John Wesley, in 1790 and it was he who had agreed to women preachers.

Martha Thompson teamed up with Ann Cutler and the two evangelists would claim converts in Lancashire who had witnessed Thompson's singing and Cutler's praying. Martha was warned to stay clear of Cutler because of her strength and enthusiasm which Martha's father feared would kill his daughter. Cutler went on to work with Bramwell and they are credited with leading revivals in Derby, Lancashire, Cheshire and Lancashire in the years following Wesley's death in 1791.

Her mentor, William Bramwell, had a respect for Cutler. She was known as "Praying Nanny" because of her frequent, loud and at times public prayers. When Bramwell got into difficulty then he would benefit from Cutler's prayer techniques. Cutler never married and was keen to ensure that there was no gossip. When she was returning late at night she would refuse a male escort in order to avoid any suspicion.

She died in Macclesfield in 1794 at the age of 35. William Bramwell published a short account of her life.
