= St Mark's Church, Worsley =

St Mark's Church
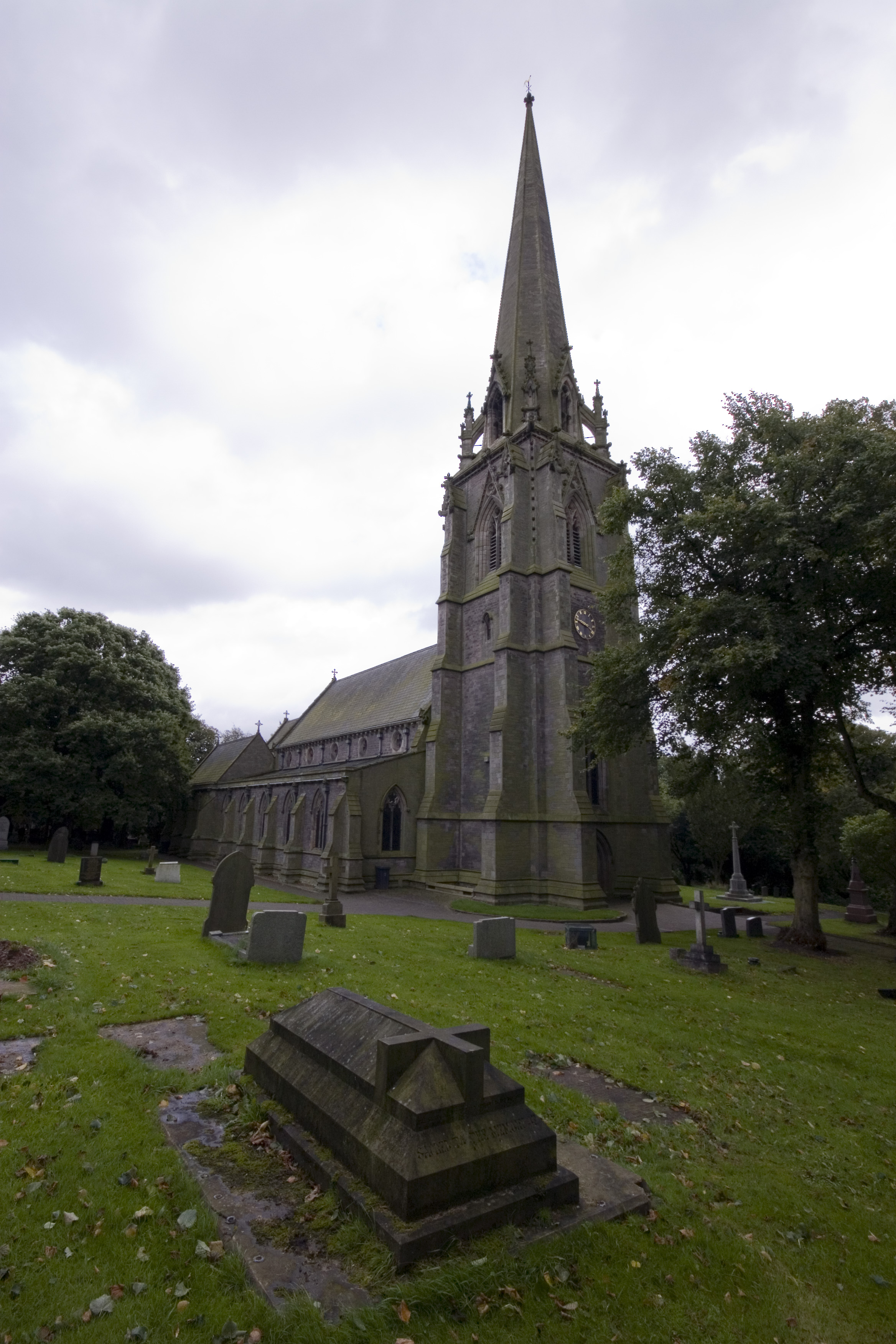
- St Mark's Church, Worsley
- St Mark's Church
- 53.502°N 2.385°W
- OS grid reference: SD 74566 00695
- Location: Worsley, Greater Manchester
- Country: England
- Denomination: Anglican
- Website: St Mark's Church

History
- Status: Parish church
- Dedication: St Mark
- Consecrated: 2 July 1846

Architecture
- Functional status: Active
- Heritage designation: Grade I
- Designated: July 1966
- Architect: George Gilbert Scott
- Architectural type: Church
- Style: Gothic Revival
- Groundbreaking: 1844

Specifications
- Materials: Sandstone

Administration
- Province: York
- Diocese: Manchester
- Archdeaconry: Salford
- Deanery: Eccles
- Parish: Worsley

Clergy
- Rector: Revd. Adam Whittle

St Mark's Church is an active Anglican parish church in Worsley, Greater Manchester, England. It is part of a team ministry along with St Mary's in Ellenbrook and St Andrew in Boothstown. The church is in the Eccles deanery, the archdeaconry of Salford and the diocese of Manchester. The church was granted Grade I Listed status in 1966.

== Background ==
The church's history is bound up with the emergence of Worsley as a cradle of the Industrial Revolution, at the hands of the Egerton family. The Earl of Ellesmere, heir of the Duke of Bridgewater who built the Bridgewater Canal, commissioned George Gilbert Scott to design the church.

The church is built on a prominent 10-acre (4 ha) site formerly known as Cross Field on Worsley Brow. Now within a conservation area, its extensive churchyard is bounded by stone walls with lych gates on the west and south, the M60 motorway to the east, and woodland on the north. The church spire is a landmark for many drivers who pass it on the motorway which bisects the parish.

The church was built between 1844 and 1846, at a cost of £20,000 (equivalent to £400,000 in 2025).. It was one of the earliest of 470 churches designed by Scott who, according to his son, regarded it as one of his most successful and purest essays in the geometrical Decorated Gothic style of the late 13th and early 14th century, with careful attention to detail.

== Architecture ==
=== Exterior ===
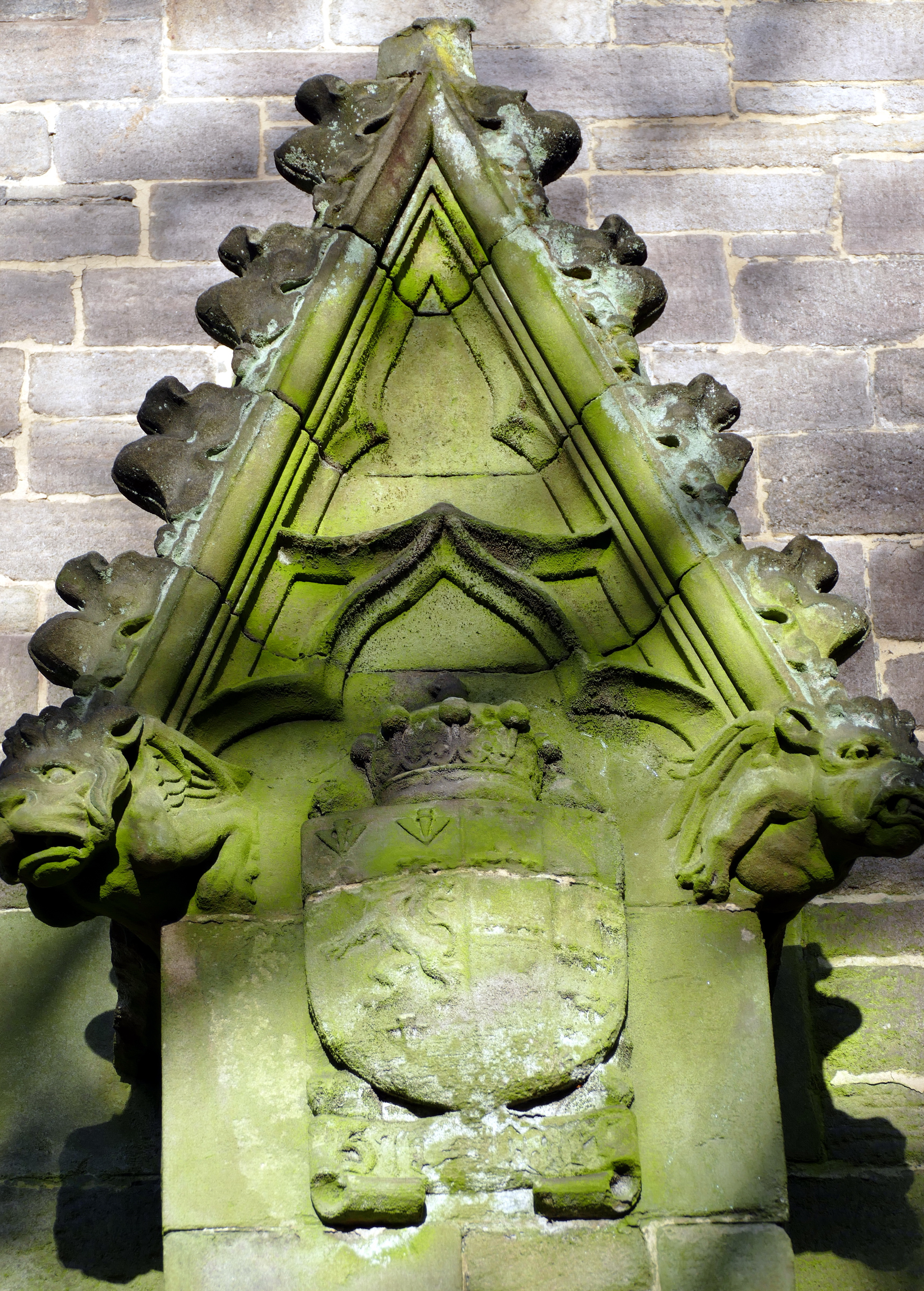
Detail of exterior

The church is constructed from hard snecked sandstone, with roofs in slate (from the Delabole quarries in Cornwall). Much of the hidden leadwork has been replaced with stainless steel. Its plan is of a nave of five bays a chancel, north and south aisles and a west tower. The base of the west tower and spire forms the west porch. The tower has richly carved corner pinnacles and flying buttresses and numerous carved gargoyles. The spire rises to 185 feet (56 m).

=== Interior ===
Inside, the nave has an oak hammer-beam roof and the chancel is flanked by the vestry and organ chamber on the north side and the Ellesmere Chapel on the south. The north aisle was added in 1852 and shortly after that the Ellesmere Chapel was altered by the addition of a family vault below and extended to the east. The chapel was re-ordered in the 1920s.

Twelve windows were acquired by Scott from France, Belgium or Italy depicting saints, two others were made by the studios of Edward Burne-Jones and the aisle windows are Powell's cast glass.

=== Fittings and furniture ===
The ring of bells was augmented to 10 in 1934.

The church clock strikes thirteen at 1 o'clock by means of a device invented by the Duke of Bridgewater to prevent his workforce returning late from their lunch hour. The mechanism was transferred from the Bridgewater estate yard at Worsley Green to the church tower in 1946.

The fittings are of the highest quality, the original oak pews, a pulpit fashioned by Scott from carved panels acquired on his travels, a richly decorated limestone font and the tomb of Francis Egerton and brasses and memorials to later members of the family in the Ellesmere Chapel. Additions were made in the 1880s including an ornate Italian marble and mosaic reredos, paving in the choir and sanctuary, carved choir stalls by R. Knill Freeman and a vestry when choral services were introduced. In 1894 a lectern designed by John Douglas was installed.

=== Churchyard ===
The churchyard contains a memorial to St. Vincent Beechey, founder of Rossall School and the war graves of 10 service personnel of World War I and 18 of World War II.

== See also ==
- Grade I listed churches in Greater Manchester
- Grade I listed buildings in Greater Manchester
- Listed buildings in Worsley
- List of new churches by George Gilbert Scott in Northern England
- List of church restorations, amendments and furniture by John Douglas

Media related to St Mark's church, Worsley at Wikimedia Commons

== Bibliography ==
- Hartwell, Clare; Hyde, Matthew (2004). The Buildings of England - Lancashire: Manchester & the South-East. Yale University Press. ISBN 978-0-300-10583-4.
- Milliken, H. T. (2007), Changing Scene, Worsley local library: Sharon Press
