= Phil Hamer =

- Born: 13 August 1990 (age 36) Salford, England
- Height: 6 ft 2 in (188 cm)
- Weight: 186 lb (84 kg; 13 st 4 lb)
- Position: Forward
- Shot: Right
- Played for: Manchester Phoenix
- Playing career: 1995–March 2024

Philip Hamer (born 13 August 1990) is a former professional ice hockey player from the Worsley village in the City of Salford.

Hamer played for the Manchester Phoenix in the Elite Ice Hockey League. Hamer was the first player to be promoted through the Phoenix youth system and make an EIHL appearance for the Phoenix.

Hamer was also an accomplished inline hockey player and he was a FIRS World Champion in 2008 at Under 19 level, whilst playing for Great Britain. He has also represented Great Britain IIHF at 7 world championships.

== Arrest ==
On 6 March 2024, Hamer was accused of 12 sexual offences. The charges relate to offences taking place between 2010 and 2023. He was remanded until his next court appearance on 5 February 2025. He was then "found guilty of 33 rape and assault charges over a 13-year period between 2010 and 2023, in which he groomed and manipulated girls in their early-to-mid teens using social media apps." He is to be jailed for 28 years.

== Career stats ==
| | | | Regular season | | | | | Playoffs | | | | |
| Season | Team | League | GP | G | A | Pts | PIM | GP | G | A | Pts | PIM |
|---|---|---|---|---|---|---|---|---|---|---|---|---|
| 2007–08 | Manchester Phoenix | EIHL | 5 | 0 | 0 | 0 | 0 | - | - | - | - | - |
| 2008–09 | Manchester Phoenix | EIHL | 3 | 0 | 0 | 0 | 0 | | | | | |
| 2009–15 | Great Britain | IIHF Inline | 42 | 31 | 34 | 65 | 30 | | | | | |
