= Bridgewater School =

Location
- Drywood Hall, Worsley Road; Manchester, Greater Manchester, M28 2WQ; England; 53.5011°N 2.3716°W

Information
- Type: Independent, Day school
- Motto: Latin: Sic Donec ("Thus until")
- Established: 1950
- Local authority: Salford
- Department for Education URN: 105992 Tables
- Headteacher: J. A. T Nairn
- Staff: 67 (full-time) 16 (part-time)
- Primary years taught: EYFS to Year 6
- Secondary years taught: Year 7 to Year 11
- Gender: Co-educational
- Age range: 3-18
- Enrolment: 457 as of September 2022
- Capacity: 540
- Language: English
- Hours in school day: 7 hours 5 mins
- Houses: Edgerton Brackley Ellesmere
- Colours: Blue and silver
- Slogan: Where Individuals Count
- Website: www.bridgewater-school.co.uk

Bridgewater School is a British Independent school, located in Worsley in Greater Manchester.

== History ==
The school was established in 1950 as a boys school, its name coming from Francis Egerton, 3rd Duke of Bridgewater who commissioned the building of the nearby Bridgewater Canal in 1760. The school moved to its current semi-rural setting soon after, in the 1960s it became fully co-educational. A sixth form building was also constructed as the school expanded, its black and white design in keeping with the aesthetic of the older main building, Drywood Hall.

== Present day ==
In the 1990s, the school added new modern buildings and later, in the mid-2000s, added modern sporting facilities, such as an all-weather pitch and state of the art indoor sports hall. This new building, which houses a modern Drama studio as well, was opened in 2006 by the Northern Ireland international footballer, David Healy.

The school is independently run, and as such, charges tuition fees.

== Head ==
The current headteacher is J A T Nairn.

== Notable alumni ==
A variety of notable alumni have their origins from Bridgewater School.

Raffey Cassidy is an Actress who has appeared in films such 'Tommorowland', 'Vox Lux', 'Kensuke's Kingdom' and 'The Brutalist'. She has been nominated for 3 London Critics Circle Film Awards. She is the sister of Grace Cassidy, who played the role of Hannah Barton (now Matty Barton) on Emmerdale.

Special Constabulary Chief Officer Mike Walmsley MBE is a Chief Officer of the Greater Manchester Police Force. He has served as a Special Officer since 2001, and is Deputy Lieutenant for the Greater Manchester region. He received his MBE for his 'commitment and dedication to the role and how he has inspired others to continue in their support of GMP.'

Rebecca Gilliland is a musical theatre performer, known for her performances in Wicked at the Apollo Theatre 'Babe' in Dirty Dancing-UK Tour, and originating the role of 'Lucille' in The Clockmakers Daughter. She also is a TikTok Content Creator with over 200k followers.
