= The Character and Death of Mrs. Hester Ann Rogers =

Methodist tract from 1794

The Character and Death of Mrs. Hester Ann Rogers is a Methodist tract from 1794, still in print in 2008. The text is a publication of the sermon given by the Reverend Thomas Coke upon the death of the Methodist writer Hester Rogers, with an appendix written by her husband James Rogers; there is a third section, a “Supplement to the Appendix—consisting of Miscellaneous Extracts from the Journals of Mrs. Hester Ann Rogers.” Coke's sermon and James Rogers' appendix both contain published passages from Hester Rogers' own book entitled A Short Account of the Experience of Mrs. H.A. Rogers, Written by Herself as well as unpublished excerpts from her journals and correspondence. The history of the “Supplement to the Appendix” is not clear.

Thomas Coke's sermon is divided into five sections:

- First, Give an Explication of the Text.
- Secondly, Consider the grand point held forth to our view, —the Certainty of Death.
- Thirdly, Lay down some consideration against the Fear of Death, for the use and comfort of believers
- Fourthly, Draw some Inferences from the foregoing heads; and,
- Lastly, Present you with an epitome of the Experience, Death, and Character of our deceased Friend

== Editions ==
The first edition was printed in 1794 by the Conference Office, London. G. Story is listed as the agent; the book was sold by George Whitfield at the New Chapel and at the “Methodist Chapels in Town and Country.” A second edition was printed in 1796 by J. Belcher in Birmingham. The third edition dates from 1815, printed at the Conference Office in London by Thomas Cordeux. There have been dozens of subsequent editions.

Although The Character and Death can be considered as a book unto itself, Vicki Tolar Collins, Associate Professor of English at Oregon State University and expert on the works of Hester Ann Rogers, considers it “the most lengthy male text accreted to The [Short] Account” (Hester Rogers' original book). Rogers' work went through more than 71 editions after her death. The first edition, published in 1793, contained only her core narrative. Subsequent editions, published after both Hester Rogers' and John Wesley’s death, add other texts to the core text, sometimes editing or abridging the core text as well. Other than Thomas Coke and James Rogers' version, other versions include unpublished journal passages, edited correspondence between Hester and John Wesley, poems written by women in her group, a printer’s advertisement, and Rogers' spiritual letter.

In modern editions, the sermon is appended to Rogers' own book.

== The author ==
The Character and Death is a wholly Methodist work; the author(s), printer, subject matter, and rhetorical context are all products of early Wesleyan Methodism. Thomas Coke, the author, was born in Wales in 1747 and died sixty-seven years later on a voyage to India where he had hoped to fund his own Methodist missions. Before Coke met John Wesley and joined the Methodists in 1777, he had been an Anglican. Coke subsequently became the first bishop of the Methodist Church and the founder of its missions. Coke visited the Americas nine times and wrote many accounts about his trips. Coke’s most memorable works include his Commentary on the Old and New Testaments, A History of the West Indies, and the Life of John Wesley; he also published several volumes of his own sermons.

The Character and Death is the only one of Coke’s books published by the Wesleyan Conference Office. His other books were either published by general printers or other Methodist printers. However, all foreign editions of The Character and Death were published by Methodist printers: for example, in 1813 an edition of the book was published in New York by the Methodist Connection in the United States. The Character and Death appears only to have been printed in small format.

== The publisher ==
Although the name of the printer which appeared on the first and last pages of the book is the “Conference Office,” the full title of the printer was the “Wesleyan Conference Office.” The Wesleyan Conference office published books on John Wesley, Methodism, missionary voyages, and hymns. OCLC/WorldCat lists nine hundred and ten entries under “Printer: Wesleyan Conference Office” but many of these entries are editions of the same book. Their first book, printed in 1745, was an edition of John Wesley's An Earnest Appeal to Men of Reason. The book billed itself as a “defense of Methodism, describing the evils of the times in society and the church.”

The Wesleyan Conference office did not print books larger than the octavo format; they were a specialized printer interested in printing small, cheap books on Methodism for sale in Methodist churches and bookstores. Despite the fact that these books were certainly brought on missions to help convert natives, the Wesleyan Conference office published exclusively in English. George Whitfield, listed as the book's agent, was a minister in the Church of England and one of the leaders of the Methodist movement. John Wesleyan considered Mrs. Hester Ann Rogers, the subject of the book, to be the ideal Methodist woman: not only did she embody Methodist morals, she also engaged in the avid promotion of Methodism at the side of her husband, a Wesleyan itinerant.

== Significance ==
=== Methodism and printing ===
The late-eighteenth century London printing scene provides some clues as to why the Wesleyan Conference Office printed this tract. London at this time was a hotbed of printing presses: in 1724 there were only seventy-five printing presses, but by 1760 this number had shot up to over two hundred. Books had to be cheap, fresh, and quick to read; people were accustomed to sensationalized political newspapers, editorial tracts, and dailies—a shorter book, rather than a lengthy tome, was more suited to the intellectual culture of the time. As a printed book, The Character and Death fits a cultural trend; as a religious book, it was revolutionary.

Theological books in the eighteenth century were heavy, expensive, and dull, and preachers remained in one parish and did not travel. John Wesley's revolutionary approach was to send his ministers on circuits to the masses, laden with books that were small, cheap and written in a popular style. Wesley supported himself through his publishing empire and bade his U.S. followers to use his press as well. Itinerant Methodists such as Rogers' husband would have carried books with them to sell, supplementing their meagre stipends. Since every minister was also a subscription agent, the fact that Minister George Whitfield was listed as the book's agent was customary of Wesley's system.

Wesley was also revolutionary in that he encouraged journal-keeping, not only by preachers but also by ordinary Methodist society members, both men and women. Wesley believed that the discipline in journal-writing was central to the “method” of individual spiritual growth in Methodism. However, the spiritual journal of Hester Ann Rogers was the only major English publication of a woman's journal. Although Rogers published A Short Account after Wesley's death, Wesley himself intended to serve as production authority over her book.

=== Early Methodism and rhetoric ===
John Wesley's Methodism helped carve a new space for women's discourse in the public religious arena; his religious innovations created “spaces, sanctions, and support for women to speak in public and write for publication.” Wesley's Methodism was based a new method of religion, new material practices, and new institutional forms. Vicki Tolar Collins makes a distinction between Wesley's Methodism and post-Wesley Methodism: “as long as John Wesley was alive to protect the women preachers and control the men who opposed them, Methodist women were allowed to speak in public; after Wesley’s death the preaching women were silenced […].” Methodism was a rhetorically based movement—converts were won through itinerant's emotional sermons and a barrage of printed narratives; Wesley enjoyed and respected women and believed that they should have a place within Methodist rhetoric. Women were encouraged to voice their opinion publicly; many women led Methodist groups; a few Methodist women interpreted the Bible themselves and preached. Women preachers did face criticism, but with the support of their leader, they became more active and visible in the 1770s and 1780s.

=== The Character and Death, contextualized ===
After Wesley died, preaching women were silenced under the new authority of a group of men. Under this new institutional strategy, Hester Ann Rogers was subsequently idealized and promoted as a nonpreaching woman and model Methodist. Hester Ann Rogers did not preach, but she did lead classes and pray publicly—two unproblematic activities. Wesley had intended Rogers' book to be an exemplary female account of “Christian perfection” or union with God in the mist of life rather than at the moment of death; Wesley considered that Hester Ann Rogers was one of the few people to have achieved this state.

Rogers' original A Short Account was focused purely on her daily dealings with God and she barely mentioned her marriage, children, or leadership of Methodist groups. The group of post-Wesley authorities, with their new agenda, accreted texts to Roger's original work which would highlight her non-preaching religiousness and expand on her maternal and wifely role. Thomas Coke's sermon, The Character and Death, plays directly into this role. In one passage, Coke notes that

her maternal care and affection shone equally bright. Though she devoted much of her time to religious duties in public and private, yet nothing seemed to be left undone which could maker her children comfortable and happy. She even prevented all their wants; and was equally, nay, if it were possible, more attentive to Mr. Roger’s children by his former wife, than to her own.

Coke also uses one of Rogers' unpublished journal entries to cite her experience with childbirth. Vicki Collins claims that Coke's descriptions of Rogers' unwavering filial loyalty and wifely devotion are factually misrepresented: Coke clearly took liberties with Rogers' life in order to conform to the new Methodist agenda. Coke also stresses the fact that Rogers did not “presume to preach,” content to spend her time on her writing: “writing, seems to be her peculiar talent; and she took great delight therein, even from her childhood. And yet, she never, on that account, or, indeed, on any other, once neglected any part of her domestic duty.”

James Rogers' appendix to Coke's sermon follows the same model: he describes her Bible study, her visits to the sick, her public prayer, and her small group leadership. He also emphasized the fact that she never “took a text” or preached. Rogers also stresses the importance of their marriage through anecdotes as well as terms of endearment such as “my dear companion,” “best helpmate,” “one of the most valuable and faithful wives,’ “best help in spiritual things,” “ever my comforter,” “the centre and constant spring of all my domestic happiness” and “faithful love.” While Hester Rogers leaves her marital life and public duties out of her own biography, these are the very subjects which her husband, James Rogers, emphasizes in his eulogy.

Explicitly, The Character and Death is a eulogy of a model Methodist woman. Implicitly, it was rife with political agenda; Coke used his sermon to reaffirm the new direction Methodism was taking in regards to women; James Rogers subsequently reassured women that by retracting from their preaching roles they would find satisfying marital intimacy, praise from their spouse, and the church's approval. The story of The Character and Death is one of an institution—Methodism—and how it used, changed, produced, and distributed Rogers' text to shape (and limit) women's roles, women's discourse, and women's lives in Methodist communities.

== Bibliography ==
- E. Dorothy Graham, ‘Rogers, Hester Ann (1756–1794)’, Oxford Dictionary of National Biography, Sept 2004 (subscription or UK public library membership required)
- Coke, Thomas. The Character and Death of Mrs. Hester Ann Rogers: Set Forth in a Sermon, Preached on the Occasion in Spitalfiels-Chapl; London, on Sunday, Oct. 26, 1794. London: Printed at the Conference Office, G. Story, sold by G. Whitfield, 1794.
- An Account of the Experience of Hester Ann Rogers, and her Funeral Sermon, Thomas Coke and Hester Ann Rogers, BiblioBazaar 2008, ISBN 978-0-554-62686-4; Bastian Books (2008), ISBN 978-0-554-62694-9
