= Hester Rogers =

British Methodist writer (1756– 1794)

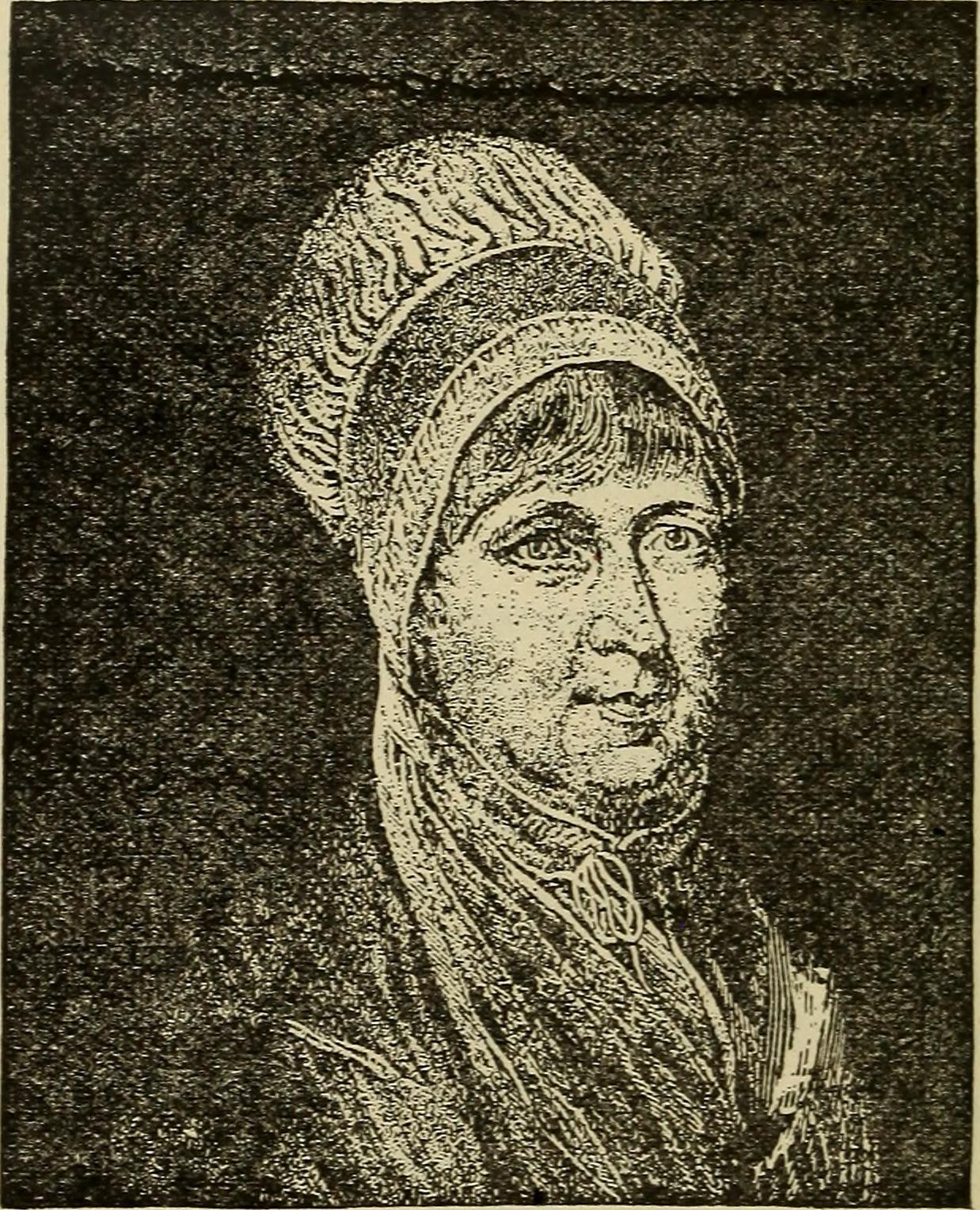
- Born: Hester Ann Roe; 31 January 1756; Macclesfield
- Died: 10 October 1794 (aged 38); Birmingham
- Known for: role model for women Methodists
- Spouse: James Rogers

Hester Rogers (31 January 1756 – 10 October 1794) was a British Methodist writer.

== Life ==
Hester Ann Roe was born in Macclesfield, England, at the end of January in 1756. She had a strict but caring upbringing. She was confirmed in 1769 by the Bishop of Chester, Edmund Keene, into the Church of England. She dated her conversion to Methodism to 11 November 1774 after hearing Samuel Bardsley preach. He was one of John Wesley's Methodist itinerant preachers. She and Ann Cutler were early Methodist evangelists.

Hester began a lifelong correspondence with the Methodist founder John Wesley after meeting him in 1776. She was a Methodist class leader and one her students was Agnes Bulmer. Hester visited the sick. Five years later, she met another Methodist preacher named James Rogers and his wife Ann. His wife died in February 1784 after childbirth and in line with Ann's wishes James married Hester in the following August. They both then went to evangelise in Ireland.

Rogers died in Birmingham in 1794. After her death, a sermon entitled "The Character and Death of Mrs. Hester Ann Rogers" was published, which presents Hester Rogers' life as a role model for female Methodists. The sermon had been given by Bishop Thomas Coke at Spitalfields and it had been published with an appendix by her husband. By 1876, it had been reworked into a Methodist tract.
