= The Ellesmere =

Listed former pub in Walkden, Greater Manchester, England

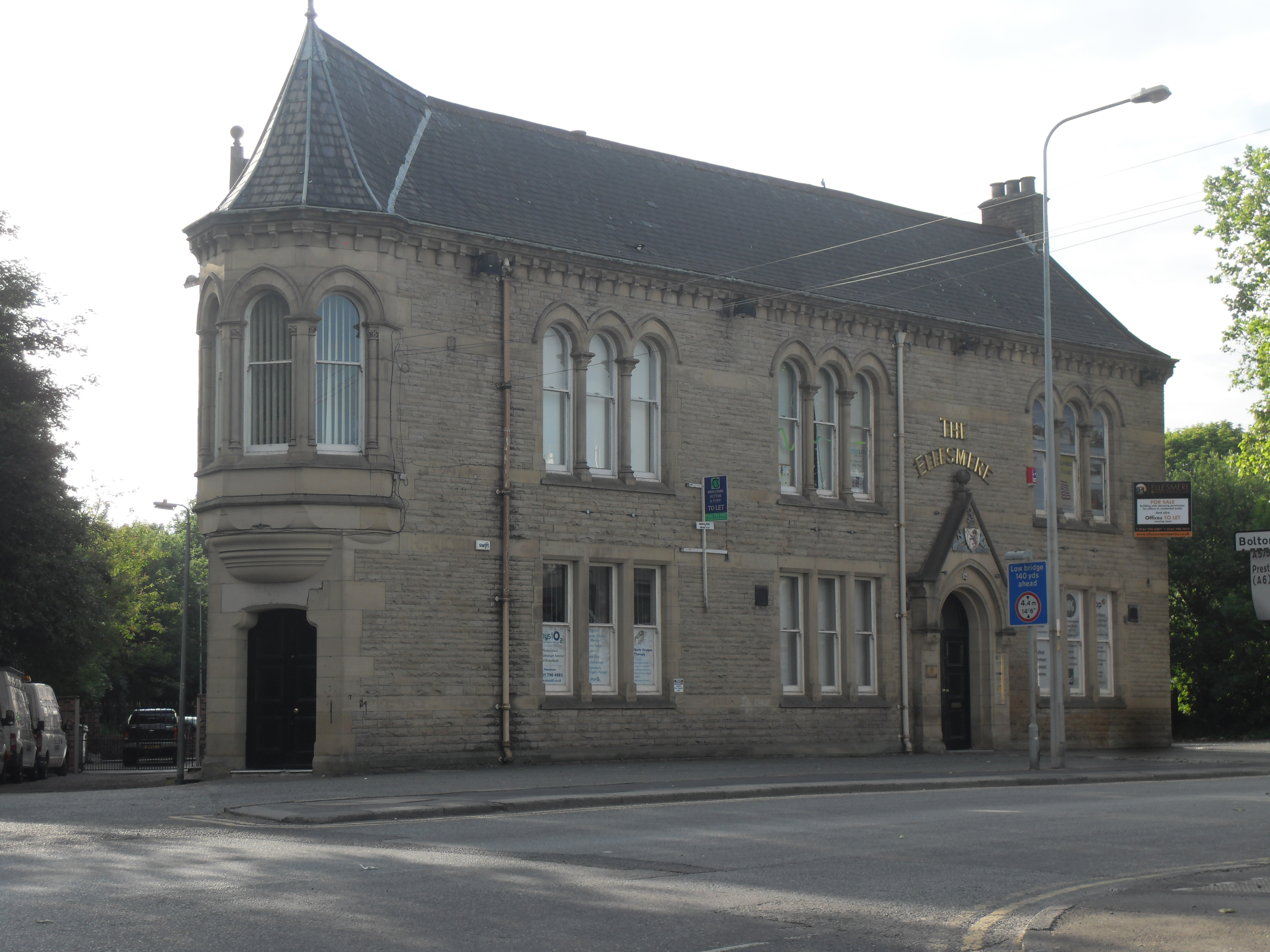
- The former pub in 2010

- Location within Greater Manchester
- Alternative names: Ellesmere Hotel

General information
- Status: Converted to offices
- Type: Public house (former)
- Architectural style: High Victorian Gothic
- Location: Walkden Road, Walkden, Greater Manchester, England
- Coordinates: 53.5185°N 2.3970°W
- Year built: 1860s or 1870s

Design and construction
- Designations

Listed Building – Grade II
- Official name: The Ellesmere public house
- Designated: 2 September 1987
- Reference no.: 1287521

The Ellesmere is a Grade II listed former public house on Walkden Road in Walkden, a town in the City of Salford, Greater Manchester, England. Built in the 1860s or 1870s in a High Victorian Gothic style, it stood beside Walkden Stocks station and was built to serve its passengers. The building appears as the Ellesmere Hotel on late 19th and early 20th‑century Ordnance Survey maps. It was later converted to offices.

== History ==
The building was constructed in the 1860s or 1870s, according to its official listing, to serve passengers at the neighbouring Walkden Stocks station, which closed in 1954. The 1893 and 1938 Ordnance Survey maps mark the building as the Ellesmere Hotel public house, and the earlier edition also shows a bowling green beside it.

On 2 September 1987, The Ellesmere was designated a Grade II listed building. The building was subsequently converted to office use, although the date of the conversion is not recorded.

== Architecture ==
The building is constructed in stone, with brickwork to the rear and a slate roof, and has two storeys arranged across three bays at the front and four along the side. It is designed in a High Victorian Gothic style, with a raised base, horizontal bands between the floors and deep eaves beneath a steep roof. The ground floor has three mullion and sash windows with stone frames, and the main entrance sits between the second and third bays, topped by a fanlight and a small gable carrying the Ellesmere coat of arms. Above, three matching first‑floor windows have arched tops and slender dividing shafts.

The left-hand corner is angled at street level and contains a doorway with a shouldered arch, above which is a polygonal oriel window marking the turn into Brindley Street. The Brindley Street side follows the same general treatment but includes a blocked opening on the ground floor and two gabled dormer windows with arched lights and decorative finials.

== See also ==
- Listed buildings in Worsley
- Listed pubs in Greater Manchester
