= Martha Thompson =

Martha Thompson (1731–1820) was an English Methodist. She was a housemaid in London, and was converted to Methodism after hearing John Wesley preach in Moorfields. Thompson was declared insane and sent to Bedlam, but Wesley later freed her and rode with her back to her hometown of Preston. There she became a founder of Methodism in the region.

Thompson paired up with Ann Cutler and the two evangelists would claim converts who had witnessed Thompson's singing and Cutler's praying.

Thompson's story was told in the 1976 musical "Ride! Ride!", written by Alan Thornhill and scored by Penelope Thwaites.
