= Listed buildings in Thornley-with-Wheatley =

Thornley-with-Wheatley is a civil parish in Ribble Valley, Lancashire, England. It contains nine listed buildings that are recorded in the National Heritage List for England. All of the listed buildings are designated at Grade II, the lowest of the three grades, which is applied to "buildings of national importance and special interest". The parish is entirely rural, and most of the listed buildings are farmhouses and farm buildings. The other listed buildings are a house, a church and presbytery, and a mounting block.

== Buildings ==
Name and location	Photograph	Date	Notes
New House Farmhouse; 53.86352°N 2.55348°W	—	17th century	A sandstone house with a slate roof, in two storeys. On the front is a porch and a doorway with a plain surround and flanked by long-and-short stones. The windows have chamfered surrounds, and some have retained their mullions. At the rear is an outshut.
Oaks Barn; 53.84730°N 2.58683°W	—	17th or early 18th century	A field barn with an integrated cow shelter, it has an internal cruck frame construction. The walls are in sandstone with quoins, and the roof is slated with a stone ridge and coped gables. There is one storey, and the cow shelter is wider, giving a T-shaped plan. The building contains entrances and ventilation slits, and inside is a cruck truss.
Thornley Hall; 53.86458°N 2.55773°W		Early 18th century	The house contains some 17th-century material. It is rendered with a slate roof and rusticated quoins. There are two storeys and the windows are sashes. On the front is a gabled porch with coping and ball finials, and a doorway that has a triangular head and an inscribed lintel.
Jenkinson's Farmhouse; 53.84091°N 2.59108°W	—	1726	A stone house with a slate roof in two storeys, with an outshut at the rear. The windows have chamfered surrounds and mullions. The doorway has a plain surround and an inscribed lintel.
White Fold Farmhouse and barn 53.84910°N 2.57733°W	—	Mid 18th century	The house and barn are in sandstone with roofs partly of slate and partly of stone-slate. The house has two storeys and two bays. The doorway has a plain surround and is flanked by long-and-short stones. The windows are modern with chamfered surrounds, and in the right gable end is a stair window. To the left is a barn that has a wide entrance with a segmental head, two windows, and three doors.
Wheatley Farmhouse and former stable 53.85359°N 2.57920°W	—	1774	The house and former farm building are in sandstone with a slate roof. The house has two storeys with an attic. The windows have plain surrounds, and those on the front no longer have mullions. On the front is a doorway that has an architrave, a pulvinated frieze and an open pediment, and above it is an inscribed plaque. On the right side is a trough carved from one piece of stone. The former farm building to the left has a doorway and two pitching holes.
Higher Birks Farmhouse; 53.84649°N 2.58436°W	—	Mid 19th century	Material from the 17th century has been incorporated in the house. It is in sandstone with a slate roof, and has two storeys with an attic, and a front of three bays. The windows on the front are sashes with architraves, and elsewhere are mullioned windows, a stair window, and modern windows. There is an open stone porch and a doorway with a chamfered surround and a triangular head.
Lee House, Church of St. William of York, and presbytery 53.85623°N 2.58663°W		Mid 19th century	A Roman Catholic church and presbytery that are rendered with sandstone dressings and slate roofs. The church has three bays that contain windows with four-centred heads and diamond glazing. The west wall is gabled and contains a doorway with a moulded surround and a four-centred head. On the gable apex is a cross finial. The presbytery to the east has two storeys and two bays. Its windows are sashes, and the doorway has a moulded surround and a cornice hood.
Mounting block 53.84656°N 2.58410°W	—	19th century (probable)	The mounting block is on the roadside by Higher Birks Farmhouse. It is in sandstone and has four steps on each side and a flagstone on the top.
