= Worsley Court House =

Building in Worsley, Greater Manchester, England

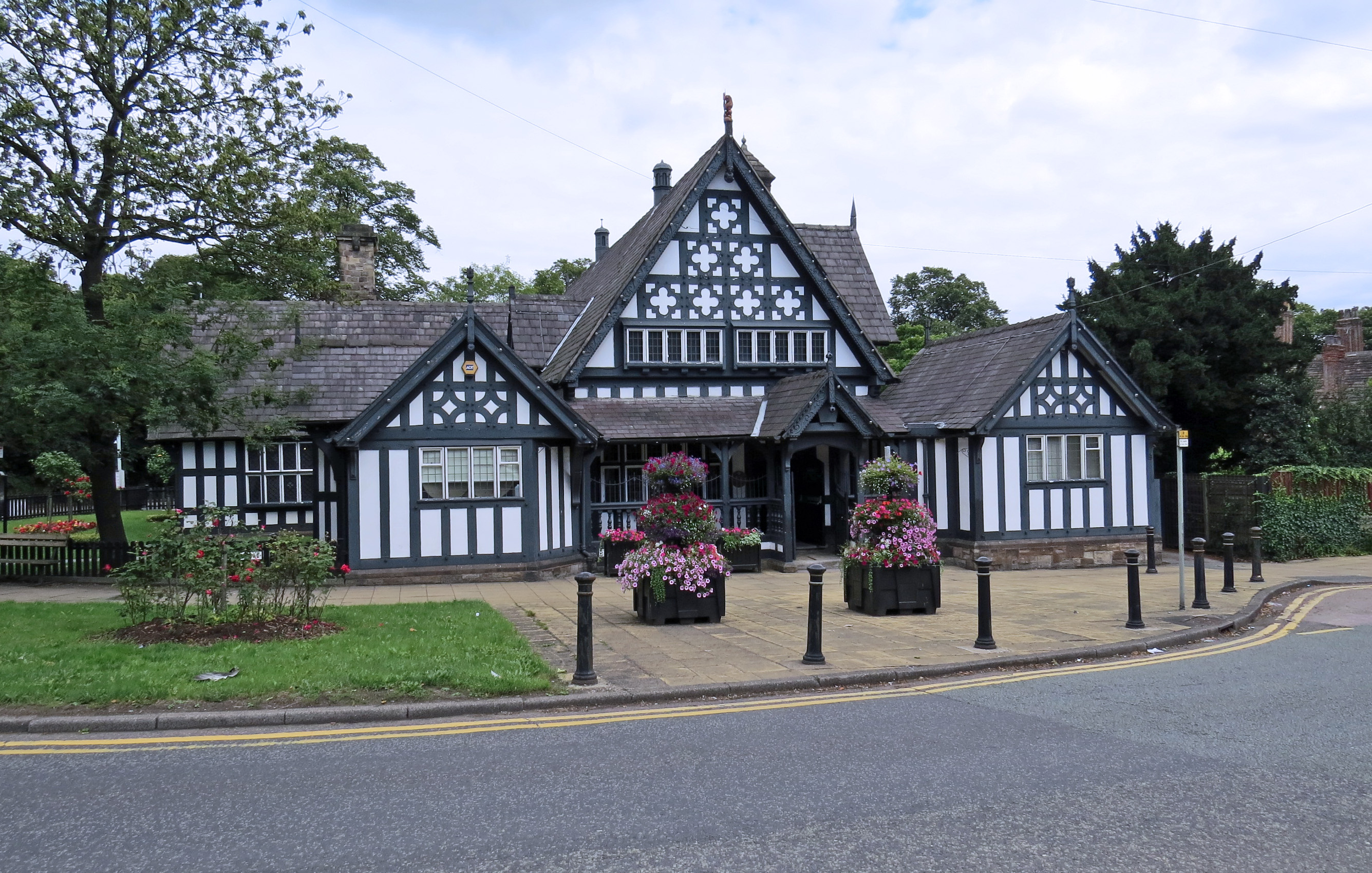
- Worsley Court House

General information
- Location: Worsley, Greater Manchester,
- Coordinates: 53.4994147°N 2.3817829°W
- Completed: 1849
- Owner: Salford City Council

Worsley Court House is a conference and weddings venue in Worsley, Greater Manchester, England. Built in 1849 for Francis Egerton, 1st Earl of Ellesmere as the local manor court, it was later used as a magistrates' court. In 1966, it was granted Grade II listed status.

== History ==
Worsley Court House was built in 1849 for Francis Egerton, 1st Earl of Ellesmere to be the court leet, the manorial court of Worsley. Before the courthouse was constructed, the site was used to house the village stocks. During the 1850s, the courthouse was also used as a night school for local tenants and estate workers.

The court leet last sat in 1888, and from then it was used as a magistrates' court. The 1st Earl of Ellesmere and his son Algernon Egerton both used the courthouse for election meetings when they were MPs. On 27 December 1873, the Worsley Troop of the Duke of Lancaster's Own Yeomanry hosted a grand ball at the courthouse. The building also served as Worsley's town hall until the Urban District of Worsley was created in 1894.

In 1923, John Egerton, 4th Earl of Ellesmere sold his Worsley estates including the courthouse. Bridgewater Estates Ltd owned the courthouse and used it for private functions. It was sold to Worsley Urban District Council in 1966 for £6500 and was granted Grade II listed status that same year. The building was extended the following year. In 1974, ownership passed to Salford City Council.

== Architecture ==
The courthouse has a slate roof and is timber framed on a projecting stone plinth, and is one of the earliest examples of the Black-and-white Revival architecture in the United Kingdom. The studded framing has square panelling in its gables. The building centres around the large hall with tall gables surrounded by lower single-storey rooms. The gables have decorative bargeboards and finials. The doorway has a Tudor arched surround and a studded door. A ground-floor loggia with a balustrade forms a porchway.

== See also ==
- Listed buildings in Worsley
