= John Gilbert (agent) =

British land agent and engineer

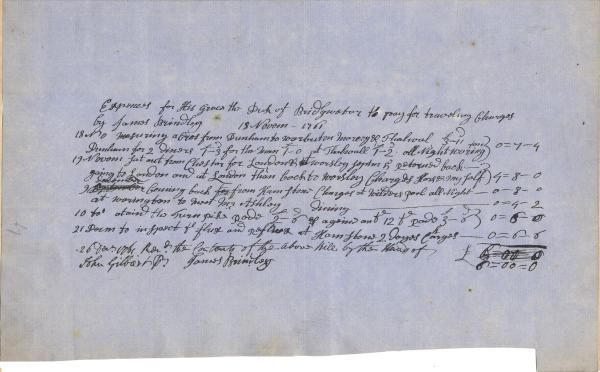
Document containing the travel expenses for James Brindley, signed by Brindley and John Gilbert

John Gilbert (1724–1795) was land agent and engineer to the third Duke of Bridgewater and is credited with the idea that led to the building of the Bridgewater Canal.

John Gilbert was born in Staffordshire. When he was aged 12–13 he was apprenticed to Matthew Boulton, a manufacturer of small metal objects and the father of Matthew Boulton, the engineer. When Gilbert was aged 19 his father died and he left his apprenticeship to superintend the family lime works. John's brother, Thomas, was working as agent to Lord Gower, brother-in-law of the Duke of Bridgewater. Thomas invited John to inspect the Duke's coal mines at Worsley, and here John suggested the idea of a canal, to drain the mines and to convey the coal. Around 1758 John was appointed as the Duke's agent and moved to live in Worsley. Here he started on the levelling and surveying work necessary for this project. Later James Brindley was appointed as engineer to the canal and the Duke, Gilbert and Brindley worked on the plans for the canal and supervised its building from Worsley Old Hall.

For the Duke, Gilbert also ran the demesne farm and set up a lead pencil factory at Worsley using plumbago from the Duke's mines in Keswick. When lime was found on the Duke's estate, Gilbert's previous experience helped to develop lime burning as an additional source of revenue. As separate undertakings, Gilbert worked on the drainage of Martin Mere and in the reclamation of the northern portion of Chat Moss. In the 1770s Gilbert worked as agent for the Duke of Devonshire working on a project to build an underground canal for his Ecton Hill mines. In the 1780s Gilbert developed the first deep salt mine at Marston Mine near the Lion Salt Works in Cheshire. At the time of his death work was proceeding to his design of an inclined plane within the Worsley mining system.

== See also ==
- Canals of the United Kingdom
- History of the British canal system
