= Jonathan Crowther (minister) =

English church minister in India (1794–1856)

Jonathan Crowther (1794–1856) was an English Wesleyan Methodist minister, who for a period supervised Wesleyan missionaries in the Madras Presidency of the British Raj.

== Life ==
He was born at St. Austell, Cornwall, on 31 July 1794; his father, Timothy Crowther, and his uncles Jonathan Crowther (1760–1824) and Richard, were Methodist preachers appointed by John Wesley. He was educated at Kingswood School, then in Gloucestershire, and began to preach aged about 20.

Having been principal teacher at Woodhouse Grove School, near Bradford, Yorkshire, Crowther was appointed in 1823 headmaster of Kingswood School. He was removed from his position there in 1826, because of a brutal use of corporal punishment. One of his pupils was Christopher Walton. After this he was moved between Wesleyan circuits.

In 1837 Crowther was appointed general superintendent of the Wesleyan missions in India, returning to England in 1843 in poor health, where he was again employed in the home ministry. In 1849 he was appointed classical tutor in the Wesleyan Theological Institution at Didsbury, Lancashire.

As a scholar, Crowther had a knowledge of Hebrew and several modern languages. He acted as examiner at Wesley College, Sheffield, as well as at the New Kingswood and Woodhouse Grove schools, and wrote for Wesleyan periodicals. His health failed some time before his death, and on 31 December 1855 he was seized with "congestion of the brain" while on a visit to the Rev. William Willan in Leeds. In this friend's house he died on 16 January 1856, leaving a widow and family.
