= Thornley-with-Wheatley =

Civil parish in Lancashire, England

Coordinates: 53.859°N 2.564°W

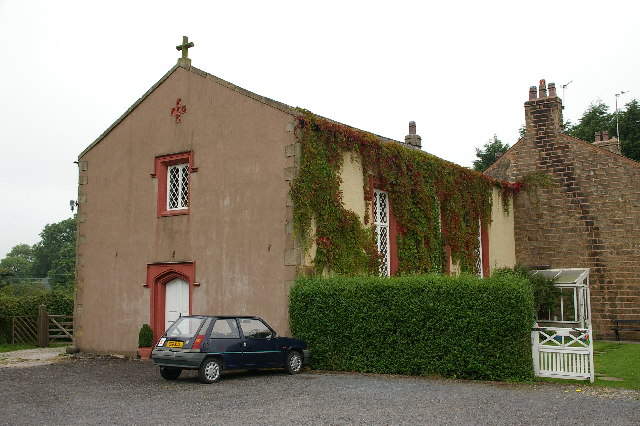
- Lee House chapel

- Location in Ribble Valley Borough Location in the Forest of Bowland Location within Lancashire
- Population: 320 (2011 Census)
- Civil parish: Thornley-with-Wheatley
- District: Ribble Valley
- Shire county: Lancashire
- Region: North West
- Country: England
- Sovereign state: United Kingdom
- Post town: PRESTON
- Postcode district: PR3
- Dialling code: 01772
- Police: Lancashire
- Fire: Lancashire
- Ambulance: North West
- UK Parliament: Ribble Valley

Thornley-with-Wheatley is a civil parish in the Borough of Ribble Valley, Lancashire, England. It is entirely rural, with no villages or other substantial settlements. Its population was 320 in 2011, a figure that has not changed much for over a century.

The parish includes most of the western half of Longridge Fell, including the part known as Jeffrey Hill, and, apart from half a mile (1 km) at its western end, lies within the Forest of Bowland Area of Outstanding Natural Beauty. The River Loud forms its northwestern border. It includes Longridge Golf Club and the isolated Catholic chapel of St William at Lee House, a Grade II listed building, whose parish closed in 1991 but is still occasionally used.

Ann Cutler, the weaver and Methodist evangelist, was born here in 1759.

== See also ==
- Listed buildings in Thornley-with-Wheatley
