= St Joseph's Convent, Salford =

Former convent in Greater Manchester, England

St Joseph's Convent
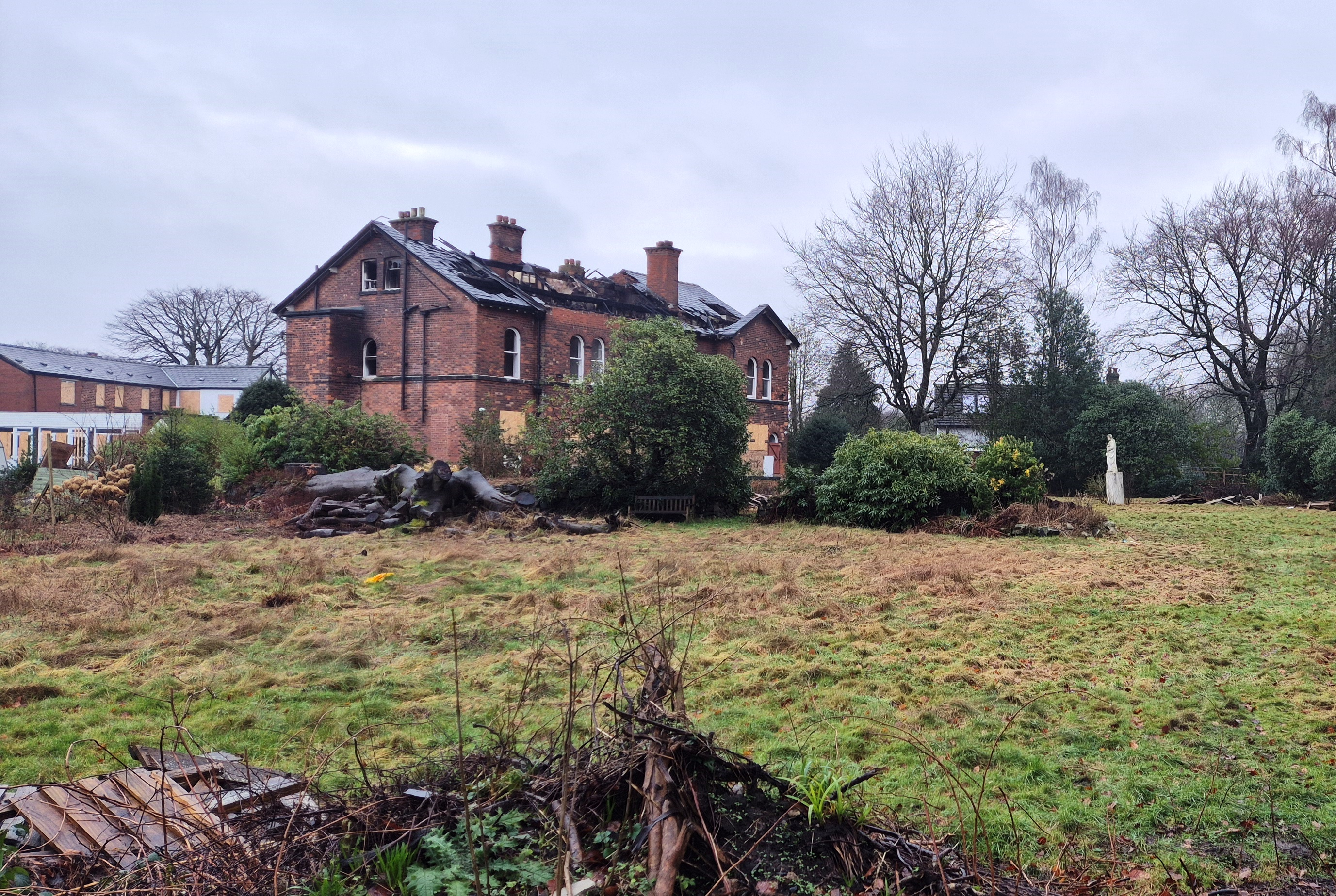
- The fire damaged convent in 2026
- Interactive map of the St Joseph's Convent area

General information
- Status: Destroyed
- Type: Convent
- Architectural style: Victorian architecture
- Location: Greenleach Lane, Worsley, Salford, England
- Coordinates: 53.5044°N 2.369341°W
- Opened: 19th century
- Closed: 1 May 2025
- Destroyed: 2026
- Owner: Diocese of Salford
- Affiliation: Catholic Church

Technical details
- Material: Brick

St Joseph's Convent was a historic building and Roman Catholic convent in Worsley, Salford, Greater Manchester, England.

== History ==
The St Joseph's Convent dated from the Victorian era. The congreagation was affiliated with the Franciscan Missionaries of Saint Joseph. The convent provided care to the elderly. The convent closed on 1 May 2025. In December 2025, plans for redevelopment were announced. On 24 January 2026, a fire destroyed part of the complex. The roof caved in and a safety warning was issued.

== See also ==
- List of churches in Greater Manchester
