= Worsley =

Village in Greater Manchester, England

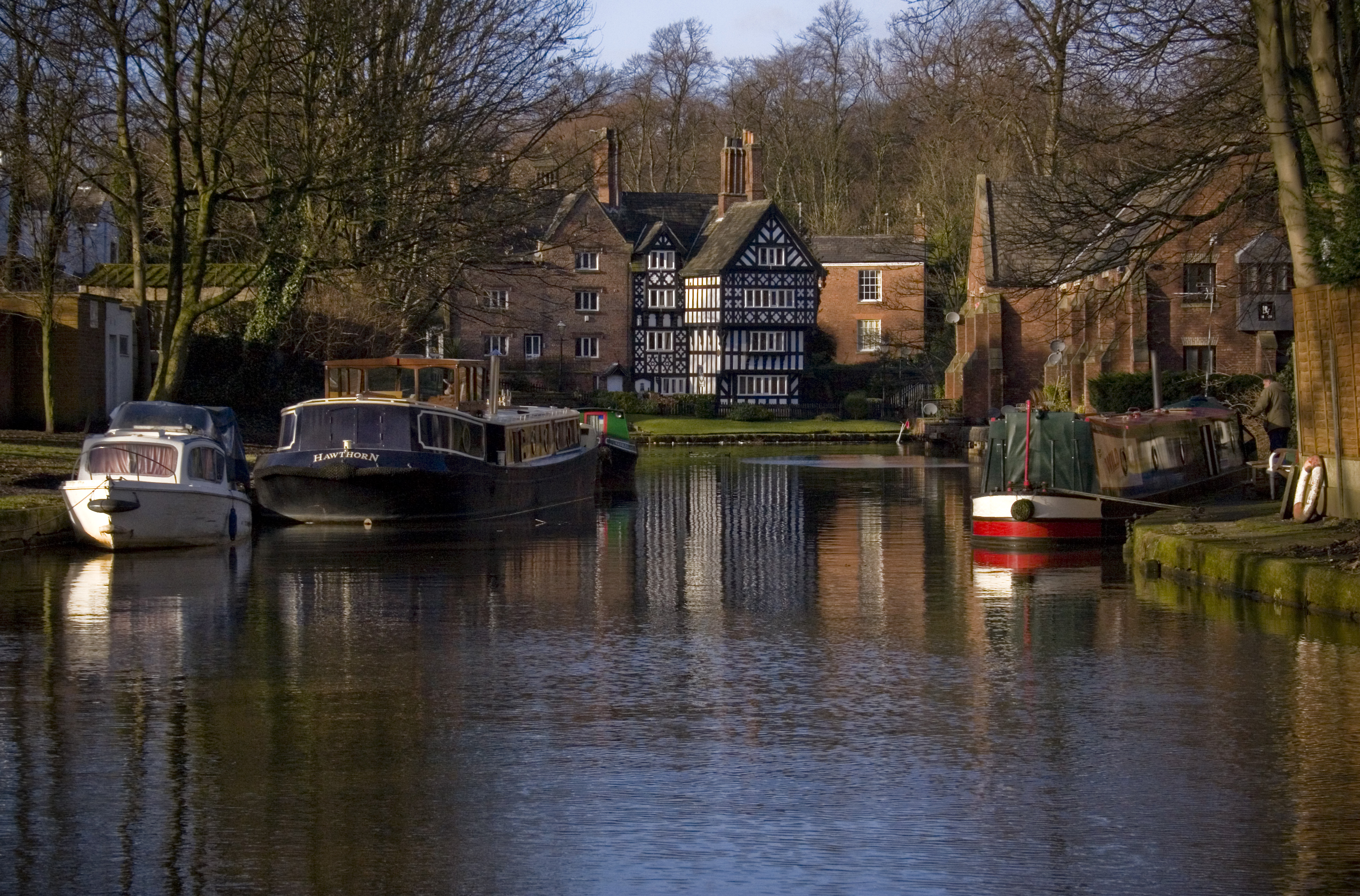
- Bridgewater Canal in Worsley, with the Packet House in the background

- Location within Greater Manchester
- Population: 10,090 (2014 estimate).
- OS grid reference: SD7401
- Metropolitan borough: City of Salford
- Metropolitan county: Greater Manchester
- Region: North West
- Country: England
- Sovereign state: United Kingdom
- Post town: MANCHESTER
- Postcode district: M28
- Dialling code: 0161
- Police: Greater Manchester
- Fire: Greater Manchester
- Ambulance: North West
- UK Parliament: Worsley and Eccles

Worsley (/ˈwɜːrzli/) is a village in the City of Salford, Greater Manchester, England, which in 2014 had a population of 10,090. It lies along Worsley Brook, 6 miles (9.7 km) west of Manchester.

Within the boundaries of the historic county of Lancashire, there is evidence of Roman and Anglo-Saxon activity, including two Roman roads. The completion in 1761 of the Bridgewater Canal allowed Worsley to expand from a small village of cottage industries to an important town based upon cotton manufacture, iron-working, brick-making and extensive coal mining. Later expansion came after the First and Second World Wars, when large urban estates were built.

Worsley Delph is a scheduled monument and a significant part of the town's historic centre is now a conservation area.

== History ==
=== Toponymy ===
Worsley is first mentioned in a Pipe roll of 1195–96 as Werkesleia, in the claim of a Hugh Putrell to a part of the fee of two knights in nearby Barton-upon-Irwell and Worsley. The spelling Worsley itself first appears in 1444. Scholars agree that the last element of the name comes from the Old English word lēah ("cleared land among woodland"). As to the first part, however, there are many variations on the name, which the place-name scholar Victor Watts divided into three varieties:

1 Werkes-type	2 Werkede-type	3 Werkedes-type
Werkesleia, 1195	Wyrkedele, 1212	Wurkythesle, 1246
Wrkesley, 1292	Whurkedeleye, c. 1220	Workedesle, Workdeslegh, 1259, 1278
Wyrkeslegh, Workesley, 1301	Worketley, 1254	Worcotesley, Workedesle, 1276
Workesley, Worseley, 1581	Wrkedeley, Workedeley, 1292	Workdisley, 1581

Type 1 looks like it comes from an Old English personal name Weorc, in which case the place-name meant "Weorc's clearing". Types 2 and 3 could come from an otherwise unattested feminines personal name Weorcgyth, in which case the name meant "Weorcgyth's clearing". But Watts also suggested that types 2 and 3 might really point to an initial element of uncertain origin followed by the Common Brittonic word found today as Welsh coed, in which case the name originated as the name of a forest along the likes of Wer-ked, which later gave its name to the settlement in cleared land.

=== Early history ===
Two Roman roads run through the area. Connecting Mamucium (Manchester) with Coccium (Wigan), one passes through Worsley near Drywood, and over Mosley Common. The present-day A6 road follows part of the course of another Roman road, which passes through the northern part of the area near Walkden and Little Hulton. In 1947 a hoard of 550 Roman coins was found near a quarry in Boothstown, dated to between AD 250 and 275, and in 1958 the head of a man was found on Worsley Moss. Named "Worsley man", and originally thought to be no more than 20 years old, upon the discovery of Lindow Man it was re-examined and dated to approximately the 2nd century AD, in the Romano-British period.

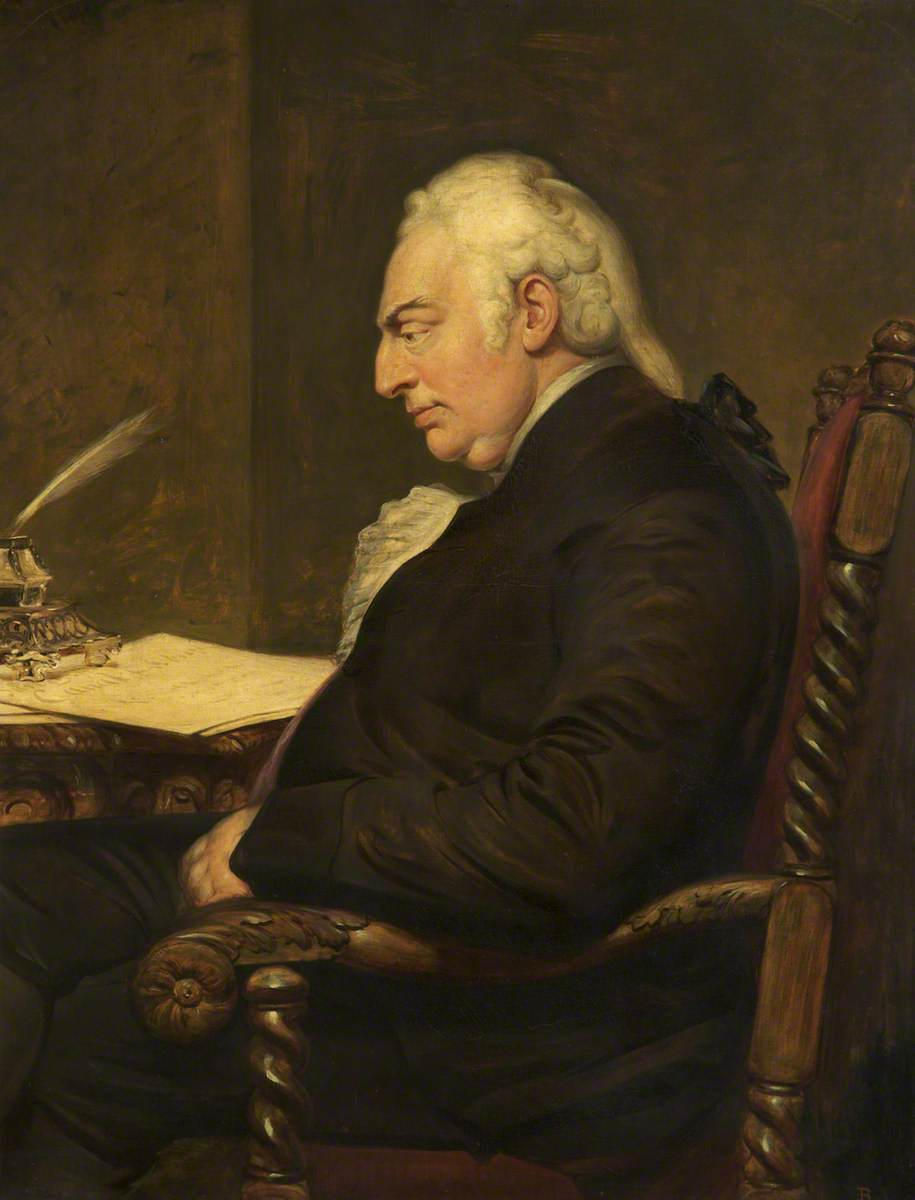
The 3rd Duke of Bridgewater, who built the Bridgewater Canal and was directly responsible for much of the economic growth of Worsley through the latter part of the 18th century.

Worsley later fell under the control of the Anglo-Saxons, who controlled much of the area around Manchester and who also defeated the British at the Battle of Chester in AD 615. Edward the Elder rebuilt the fortifications at Manchester, and in AD 924 captured all the land between the rivers Mersey and Irwell, making it demesne in the Kingdom of Wessex. During the Middle Ages the area was covered with forests and marshlands. Thinly populated by craftsmen and serfs, Worsley grew as a settlement adjoining an ancient corn mill, close to the location of the present-day Worsley Road Bridge. Most farms throughout Lancashire were small with their tenants dependent upon secondary employment, however in 1719 a John Kay of Worsley had five stirks, two bulls, 17 cows, "young cattle upon the moors", and a "cow at hire", all valued at £97 5s. Marl was commonly used as a fertiliser, and is recorded in use in 1719. Wheeler's Manchester: Its Political, Social and Commercial History, Ancient and Modern (1836) states that about one-fifth of the land around Worsley, Astley and Tyldesley was in tillage, lower on average than the surrounding areas.

=== Bridgewater estates ===
Worsley was, originally, the largest manor of the seven ancient manors of the Bridgewater Estates. It was created by William I and held for him by the Barton family in thegnage, and for them by a Norman knight named Elias, who fought in the crusades. On his death in Rhodes, the manor remained with Elias' son, whose family had by that time adopted the name of the village as its family name. On 23 June 1311 a substantial part of the Manor of Hulton was granted to the Worsleys. The family held both manors until the late 14th century, whereon they passed to the Massey family of Tatton, and then in the 16th century to the Brereton family of Malpas, Cheshire. The Brereton family added the Manor of Bedford (a small area of land to the west of Worsley) to the estate. Richard Brereton later married Dorothy Egerton, and upon his death the estates passed into the Egerton family.

In 1617 John Egerton, son of Sir Thomas Egerton, became Earl of Bridgewater. The Egerton family was descended from Sir Richard Egerton of Ridley, Cheshire. His illegitimate son, Thomas Egerton, was a prominent lawyer who served as Master of the Rolls from 1594 to 1603, and Lord Keeper of the Great Seal from 1596 to 1617 and also as Lord High Chancellor of England. John Egerton succeeded to Worsley in 1639, and died in 1649. He was succeeded by the second and third Earls of Bridgewater. The title of Duke of Bridgewater was first given to Scroop Egerton in 1720. He devised a navigation system for Worsley which was not carried out. His son, the third Duke of Bridgewater Francis Egerton, was to build the Bridgewater Canal.

The Duke purchased the Manor of Pemberton (near Wigan) in 1758, the Manor of Hindley in 1765, and the Manor of Cadishead in 1776. Upon his death in 1803 he was succeeded by George Leveson-Gower, 1st Duke of Sutherland. In 1833 the estate was inherited by Gower's son, Francis Leveson-Gower who changed his surname to Egerton, and in 1846 became the Earl of Ellesmere. In 1836 he purchased the Manor of Tyldesley. He is recorded as saying that he found Worsley to be "a God-forsaken place, full of drunken, rude people with deplorable morals".

Worsley New Hall, designed by Edward Blore, was built in 1846 for Francis Egerton the First Earl of Ellesmere. The plans are held at the Victoria and Albert Museum. Queen Victoria visited the hall in 1851 and 1857; Edward VII and Queen Alexandra visited (when Edward was Prince of Wales) in 1869, and on 6 July 1909. The hall was used as a hospital in World War I and in World War II housed Dunkirk evacuees, American soldiers preparing for D-Day and the Lancashire Fusiliers. In 1943 the hall was badly damaged by fire and demolished in 1949.

=== Industrial Revolution ===
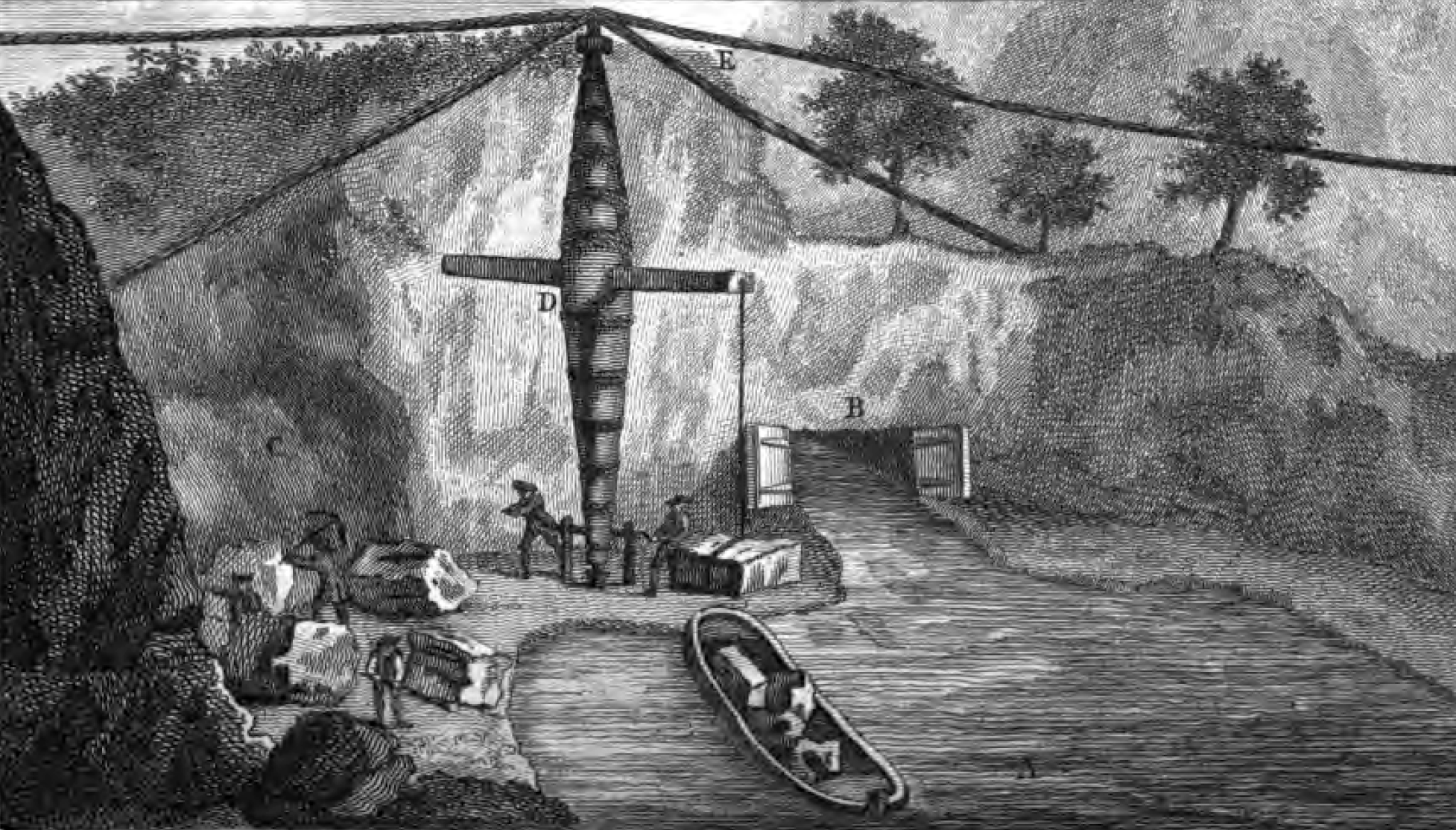
Worsley Delph as seen by Arthur Young in his 1771 book, A Six Months Tour Through the North of England. At this time there was only a single entrance to the mines.

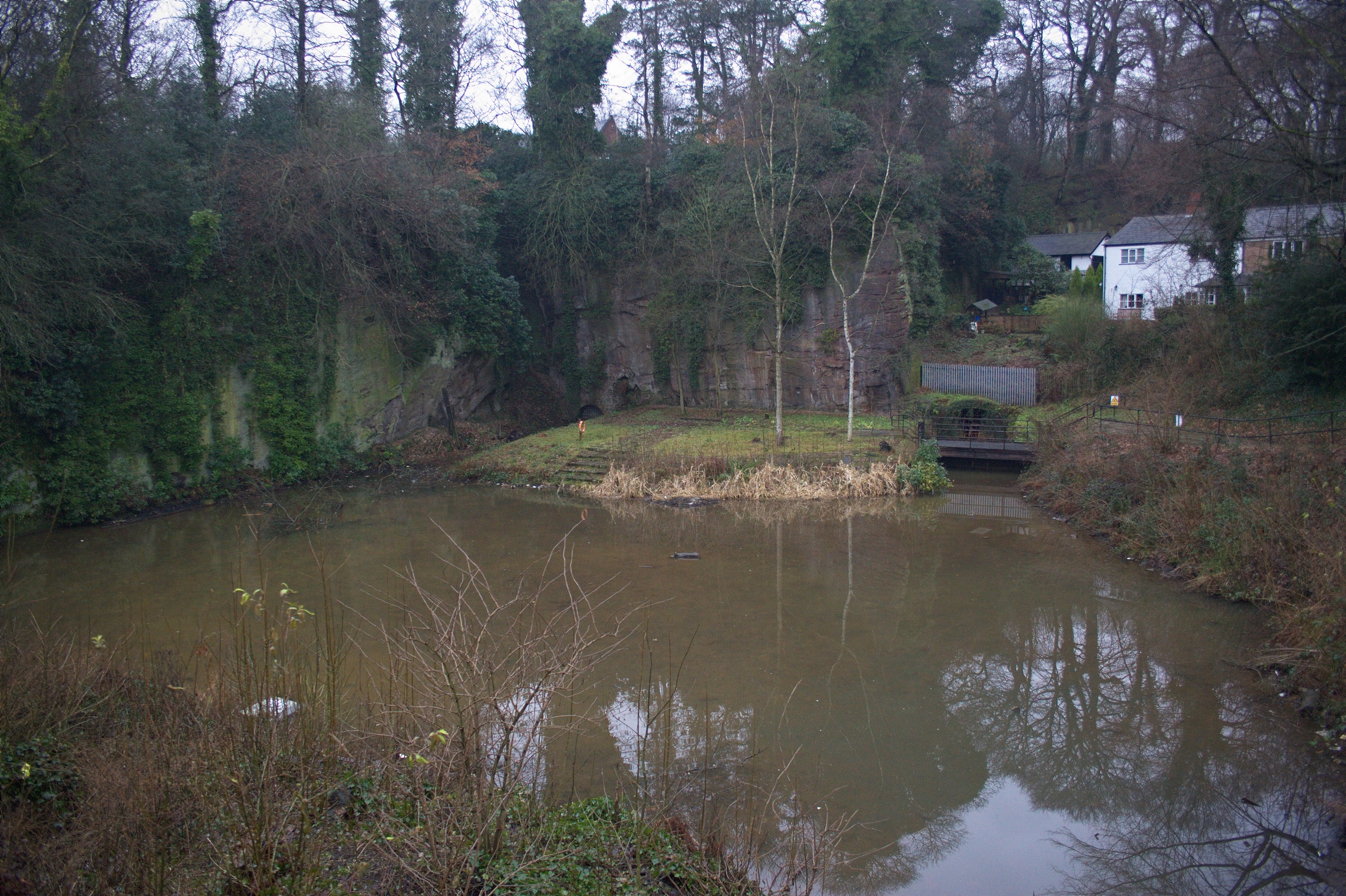
Worsley Delph in 2009. A single Starvationer boat can be seen on the left of the image. The grassed area between the two entrances was constructed during a 1960s restoration of the area.

Coal has been mined around Worsley from as long ago as 1376, originally in bell pits. The coal seams in the area tend to be fairly thin, slanting downwards from north to south, and so deeper mining became necessary during the 17th century.

With the onset of the Industrial Revolution and the growing use of steam power, there was a rapid increase in the demand for coal. The Duke's mines were among those supplying the surrounding districts but transport was both inefficient and expensive, and the mines also suffered from persistent flooding. His solution to these problems was to build a canal from Worsley to Salford, and an underground canal into the mines from Worsley Delph. The canal boats would carry 30 long tons (30 t) at a time, – more than ten times the amount of cargo per horse that was possible with a cart. The Duke and his estate manager obtained an Act of Parliament empowering them to begin construction on a planned route directly to Salford, avoiding the River Irwell.

James Brindley was brought in for his technical expertise and suggested varying the route of the proposed canal away from Salford and across the Irwell into Manchester. A second Act was secured for this variance, which included an aqueduct to cross the Irwell. This was built relatively quickly for the time; work commenced in September 1760 and the first boat crossed on 17 July 1761. The canal opened in 1761 and along with the stone aqueduct at Barton-upon-Irwell, was considered a major engineering achievement. One writer said that when finished, it "will be the most extraordanary thing in the kingdom, if not in Europe. The boats in some places are to go underground, and in other places over a navigable river, without communicating with its waters ..."

Worsley Delph, now a scheduled monument, was the entrance to the Duke's underground mines. Two entrances, built years apart, allowed access to the Starvationer boats, the largest of which could carry 12 long tons (12 t) of coal. The entrances allow access to 46 miles (74 km) of underground canal on four levels, linked by inclined planes.

The burgeoning village became a hub of commercial activity. The Duke employed craftsmen to service a wide range of industries including boat-making, plastering, blacksmithing and mining. A local quarry supplied limestone, for which a kiln was constructed at the junction of Barton Road (B5211) and Stableford Road. A quarry at the Delph supplied building materials for the region, including the stone used to construct Brindley's aqueduct. To accommodate the workers needed for these industries the Duke built extra housing and cottages. In a diary entry of 1773, Josiah Wedgwood wrote of the area "We next visited Worsley which has the appearance of a considerable Seaport Town. His Grace has built some hundreds of houses, & is every year adding considerably to their number." Worsley Green became a thriving centre of industry.

With the death of the Duke in 1803, his estates were inherited by his nephew, George Leveson-Gower, who later became the Duke of Sutherland. The canal and coal estates were placed under the control of the Bridgewater Trust, and in 1833 the rest of the estates were inherited by the Duke of Sutherland's son, Francis Leveson-Gower who changed his surname to Egerton, and in 1846 became the Earl of Ellesmere. The mines ceased production in 1887, and with the expiration of the Bridgewater Trust in 1903 the village began to change; the Duke's warehouse and the works on what is now Worsley Green were demolished. Worsley Brook was culverted, and a memorial fountain to the Duke was built from the bricks of the works' chimney.

Although much of the industry that dominated Worsley was in decline, in 1937 Sir Montague Maurice Burton opened the Burtonville Clothing Works along the East Lancashire Road. Built in the Art Deco style, in 1938 the factory employed 3,000 people.

=== Modern history ===
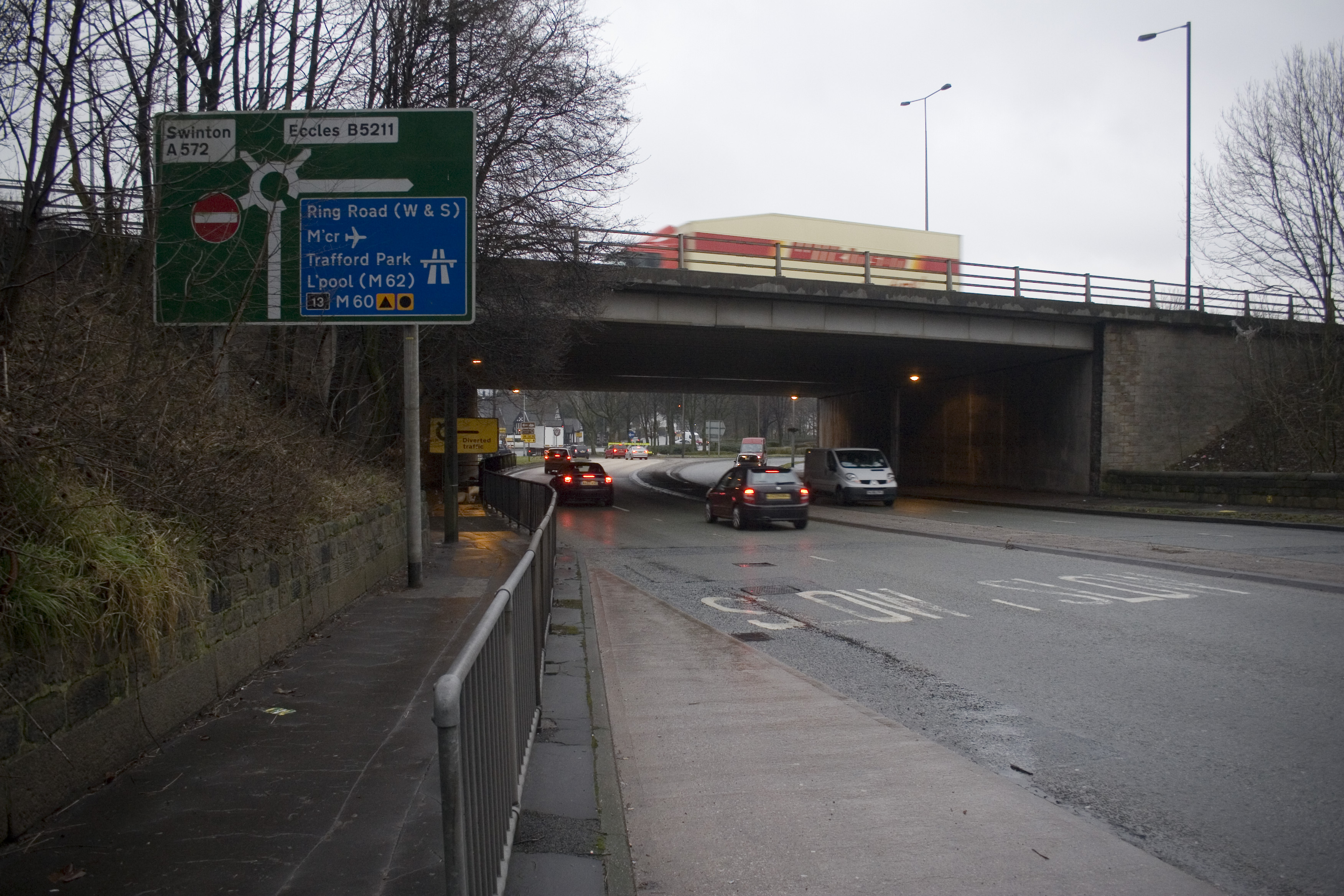
The M60 motorway bisects Worsley

Under the Housing Act 1919, large overspill estates were built by the council for veterans of the First World War, but a larger change to the area came after the end of the Second World War, when the City of Salford was forced to rehouse many of its inhabitants. With little land left, 4,518 new houses were built in the urban district by the Worsley Project. 18,000 people were rehoused under the scheme, which included new facilities, shops and schools. Another housing estate was built during the 1970s to the north of Worsley Green.

In 1944, during the Second World War, a flying bomb landed on a house near Worsley Dam, but during the war overall only five civilian lives were lost by enemy action within Worsley Urban District. An Anti Aircraft Operations Room (AAOR) was built in the 1950s. Although unused the building still exists, in wooded land to the west of the town, on the site of the former Worsley New Hall.

== Governance ==
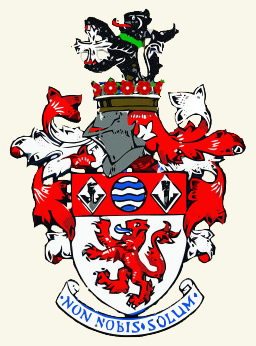
The coat of arms of the former Worsley Urban District Council

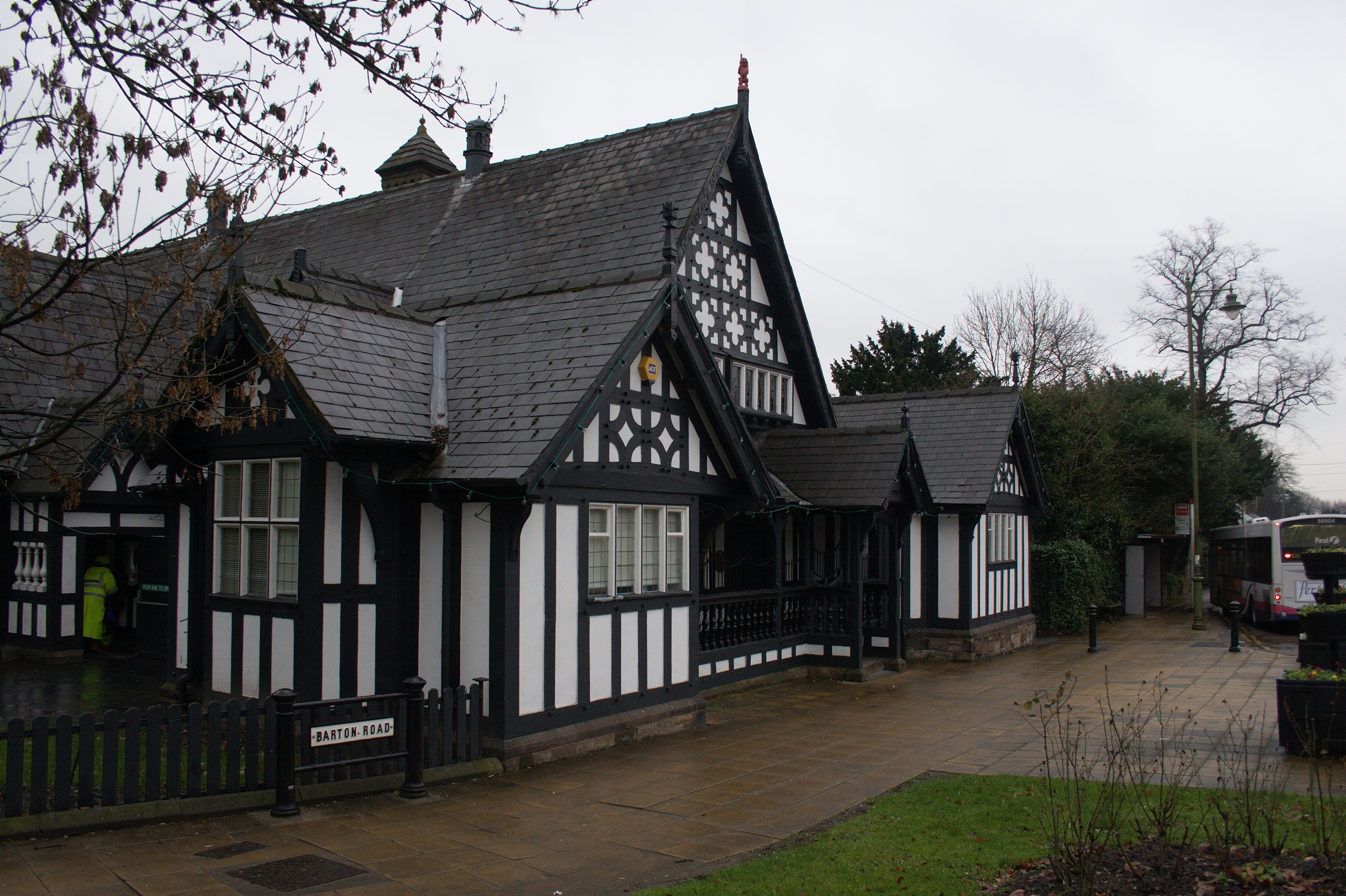
Worsley Court House, a Grade II listed building. Built in 1849 for Francis Egerton, it was originally the court leet and village hall.

From the 11th century, Worsley was a township in the Eccles parish of the hundred of Salford, and county of Lancashire. Worsley was originally in Eccles ecclesiastical parish, and also in Barton-upon-Irwell Poor Law Union. The Swinton area of the township was in 1867 included in the Swinton Local Board of Health, which from 1869 became the Swinton and Pendlebury Local Board of Health. In 1892 a small part of the township of Worsley was included in the Borough of Eccles. In 1894, under the Local Government Act 1894, Worsley Urban District was created. A part of the township then within the area of the Swinton and Pendlebury Local Board of Health was formed into Swinton township, becoming part of Swinton and Pendlebury Urban District. In 1907 two small detached parts of Worsley civil parish, then inside Swinton civil parish, were added to Swinton civil parish. A town hall was opened on 22 June 1911. Worsley Urban District gained 21 acres (85,000 m^{2}) of land from Barton-upon-Irwell Civil Parish in 1921, and in 1933 gained the area of Little Hulton Urban District. Parts were added to Eccles Borough and Irlam Urban District.

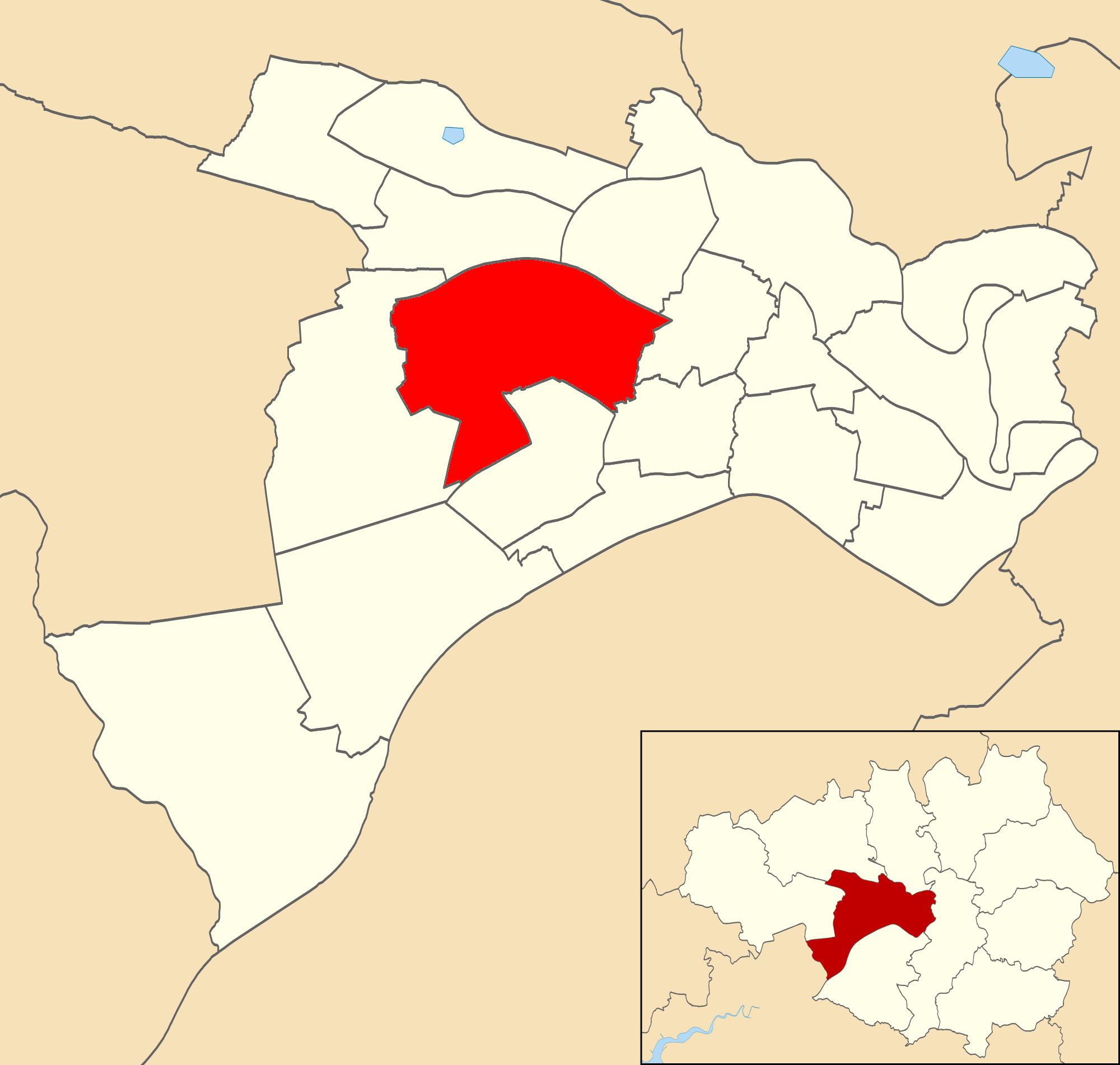
Worsley electoral ward within Salford City Council.

In 1955 Swinton and Pendlebury Borough gained a small part of Worsley Urban District, and under the Local Government Act 1972, in 1974 Worsley's Urban District status was abolished, becoming part of Salford Metropolitan District.

Following its 2006 review of parliamentary representation in Greater Manchester, the Boundary Commission for England recommended the creation of a modified Worsley constituency, incorporating a part of Eccles. The new constituency was called Worsley and Eccles South. Until the 2010 general election, Worsley was represented in the House of Commons by Barbara Keeley, Labour Party member for the Worsley constituency. After that election, Keeley represented as MP for Worsley and Eccles South, until retiring at the 2024 general election, when, following further boundary changes it became the present Worsley and Eccles seat, which has since been represented by Michael Wheeler, also a Labour MP.

== Geography ==
At 53°30′0″N 2°23′0″W (53.5000°, −2.3833°), Worsley stands about 206 feet (63 m) above sea level. Sheltered at the foot of a middle coal measure running approximately northwest and southeast across the area, the village lies along the course of Worsley Brook, which cuts through the ridge. The ridge also forms part of the northern edge of the Irwell Valley. The area is bordered on the north by the East Lancashire Road, and on the south by the Liverpool and Manchester Railway and part of the Bridgewater Canal. The larger towns of Swinton and Eccles lie to the east and southeast respectively, and to the west the area is largely bordered by Chat Moss, open fields, and forest. The M60 and M62 motorways cut directly through the area.

The underlying measures of coal have proved important for the development of the area; it was around Worsley Delph that the settlement first began to grow. Parts of the area are within an indicated floodplain. Worsley's climate is generally temperate, like the rest of Greater Manchester. The mean highest and lowest temperatures (13.2 °C (55.8 °F) and 6.4 °C (43.5 °F)) are slightly above the national average, while the annual rainfall (806.6 millimetres (31.76 in)) and average hours of sunshine (1394.5 hours) are respectively above and below the national averages.

== Demography ==
Worsley ethnicity compared
2001 UK census	Worsley (ward)	City of Salford	England
Total population	9,833	216,103	49,138,831
White	9,373	96.13%	90.92%
Asian	115	1.39%	4.57%
Black	10	1.12%	2.3%
Christian	8,252	76.46%	71.74%
Buddhist	14	0.22%	0.28%
Hindu	60	0.32%	1.11%
Jewish	28	2.4%	0.52%
Muslim	66	1.2%	3.1%
Sikh	4	0.11%	0.67%
Other religions	13	0.15%	0.29%
No religion	930	11.01%	14.59%
Religion not stated	465	8.12%	7.69%

According to the Office for National Statistics, at the time of the United Kingdom Census 2001, the ward of Worsley had a population of 9,833, of which 4,801 were male and 5,032 female. It is the fifth least populous ward in Salford, and the third least densely populated. The ward has a higher proportion of married couples with and without children than Salford as a whole. Of those over 16 years old, 1,929 were single (never married) and 4,267 married. Worsley's 4,102 households included 632 married couples without children, 818 with dependent children and 356 with non-dependent children. There were 249 lone-parent households with children. 642 households were occupied by pensioners living alone.

Of those aged 16–74, 1,428 had no academic qualifications, 1,078 had attained a level one qualification, 183 children aged between 16–17 and 242 people aged 18–74 were in full-time education. Worsley ward has the lowest levels of unemployment in Salford, in April 2006 0.9% of the economically active population were unemployment benefit claimants, comparing well to Salford as a whole where the figure is 3.7%. The area is considered to be one of the more affluent parts of Salford.

At 12.6 reported crimes per thousand population, the crime rate in Worsley is lower on average than Salford, which stands at 163.1 per thousand population.

== Economy ==
One of Worsley's early industries was weaving. A cottage industry, cotton would be spun on spinning wheels and hand-operated looms in people's homes to produce cloth. Merchants would then purchase this cloth, selling it at the Bridgewater Hotel, then known as the Old Grapes Inn.

Worsley now has little industry, and is in the main a tourist destination and commuter town. The area has two large hotels; a Novotel and a Delta. Worsley Old Hall is now a public house and restaurant in the Brunning and Price chain, part of the Restaurant Group.

== Landmarks ==
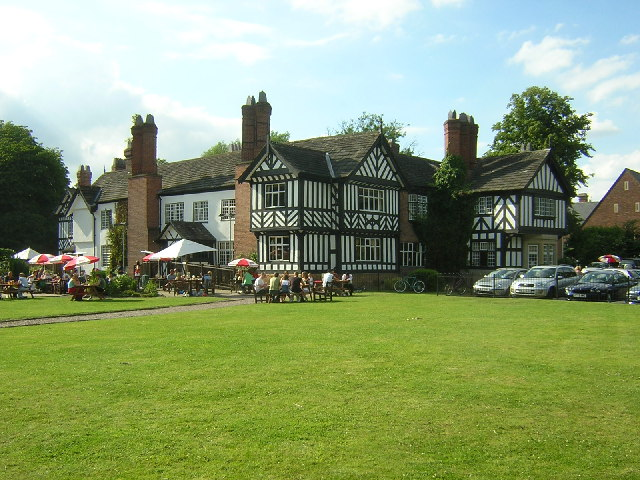
The Grade II listed Worsley Old Hall. Parts of the building date back over 900 years. It was the original manor house of Worsley Manor and is now a restaurant.

Worsley Village was in 1969 designated as a conservation area by the former Lancashire County Council. Bisected by the A572 Worsley Road, the area covered about 34.25 acres (138,600 m^{2}) of land and included 40 listed buildings, such as the Packet House, a telephone kiosk, and the Delph sluice gates, but this list has since increased to 48 listed buildings. Much of the area around the canal and Worsley Delph was restored and landscaped between 1966 and 1967 by the Worsley Civic Trust and the local council, ready for a visit by Elizabeth II on 17 May 1968. As the canal passes through Worsley, iron oxide from the mines has, for many years, stained the water bright orange. The removal of this colouration is the subject of a £2.5 million remedial scheme, which was completed in 2004. This has not been successful and as of 2017 much of the canal centered on the Delph is still bright orange.

Wardley Hall is an early medieval manor house and a Grade I listed building in Wardley. The current hall dates from around 1500 but was extensively rebuilt in the 19th and 20th centuries. Worsley Old Hall is a Grade II listed building near Walkden Road. The Post Medieval building is said to have been moated, but no signs of the moat now remain.

Parts of Worsley are currently being considered as World Heritage Sites. The area includes Worsley Delph (itself a scheduled monument), parts of Worsley Green, and the Bridgewater Canal.

In 2015, the Royal Horticultural Society announced plans for a restoration of the garden at Worsley New Hall, which opened in 2021 as RHS Garden Bridgewater.

== Transport ==
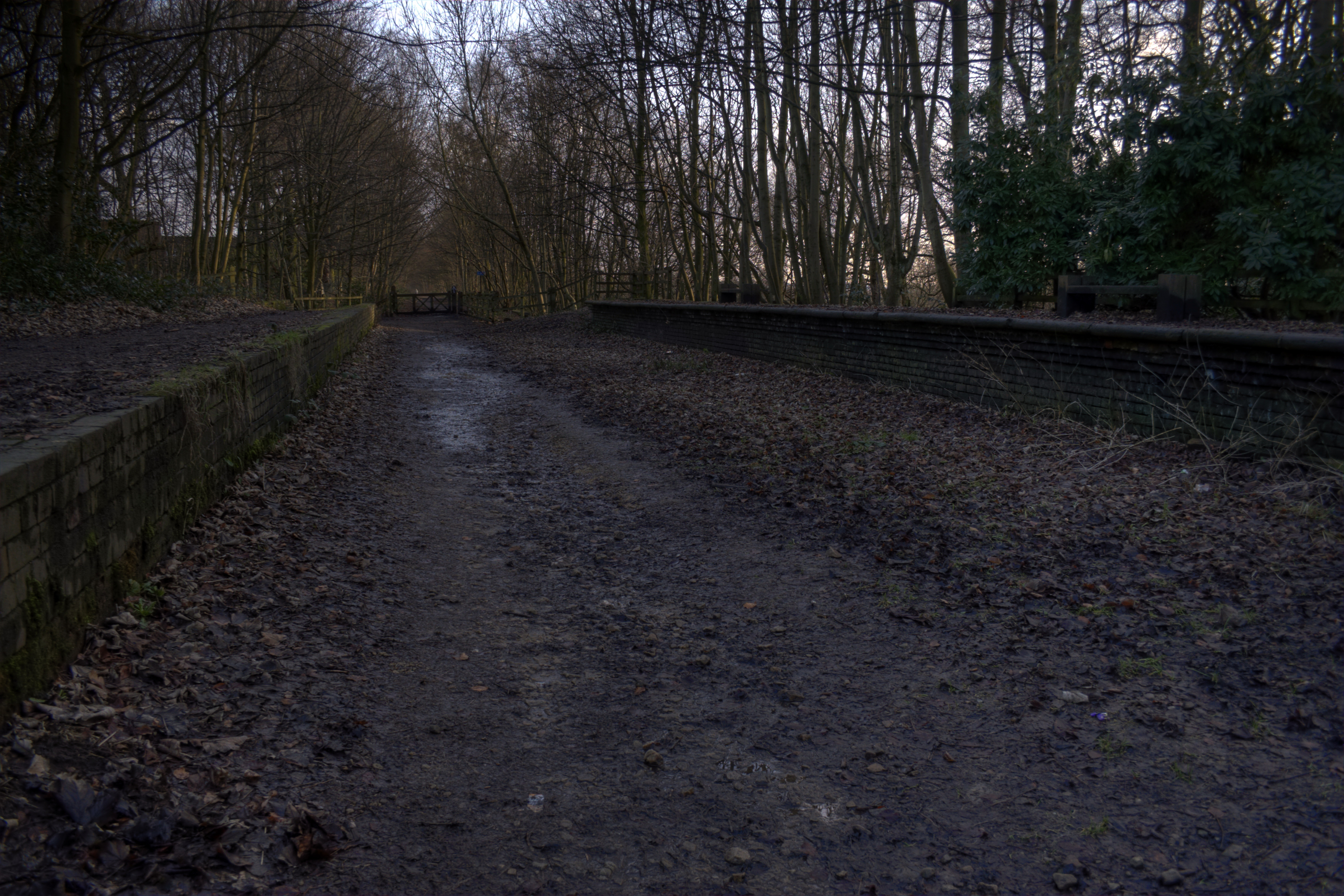
The remains of Worsley railway station

Following an Act of Parliament of 1861, in 1864 the Eccles, Tyldesley and Wigan branch line was opened by the London and North Western Railway, along with a station at Worsley which required the demolition of six cottages. The first sod had been cut by the Earl of Ellesmere. An additional branch line to Bolton was opened in 1870, branching from the Tyldesley Loopline line at Roe Green. A railway station at Monton Green was opened in 1887 to cater mainly for commuters into Manchester. The lines were important thoroughfares for the transport of coal in the area, including Mosley Common Colliery. Both lines were closed under the Beeching Axe in 1969, and have since been partially reclaimed by Salford City Council as recreational pathways.

Early public transport included the Farnworth horse-drawn omnibus service, with a terminus at the nearby Stocks Hotel in 1885. An electric tram service was founded in 1903 by the South Lancashire Tramways Company.

== Education ==
One of the first Sunday schools to be established in England may have been at Worsley. Built in the 1780s in a cottage close to the present-day courthouse, and founded by Thomas Bury (a colliery manager for the 3rd Duke) children were taught by a Luke Lowe, a cooper also in the Duke's employ. In 1785 a further three Sunday schools were established in the area, and by 1788 over 300 children were attending the four schools. Francis Egerton built a day school in 1838, which later became known as St Mark's School. This was demolished during construction of the M62 motorway, and replaced with a new school on Aviary Road, opened 19 October 1968.

The area of Worsley contains a number of primary schools, including (but not limited to) Christ the King RC Primary School, Hilton Lane Primary School and Mesne Lea Primary School. Secondary schools include Bridgewater School and The Lowry Academy.

Salford College has a campus in nearby Walkden (once within Worsley Urban District). The college's Worsley Campus, the Learning Resource and specialist Media Centre, caters for 16- to 18-year-olds, and provides access to 50 internet workstations, 15,000 books, and resources for e-learning. It also has a suite of hair and beauty salons, a performing arts theatre and a sports hall and fitness suite.

== Religious sites ==
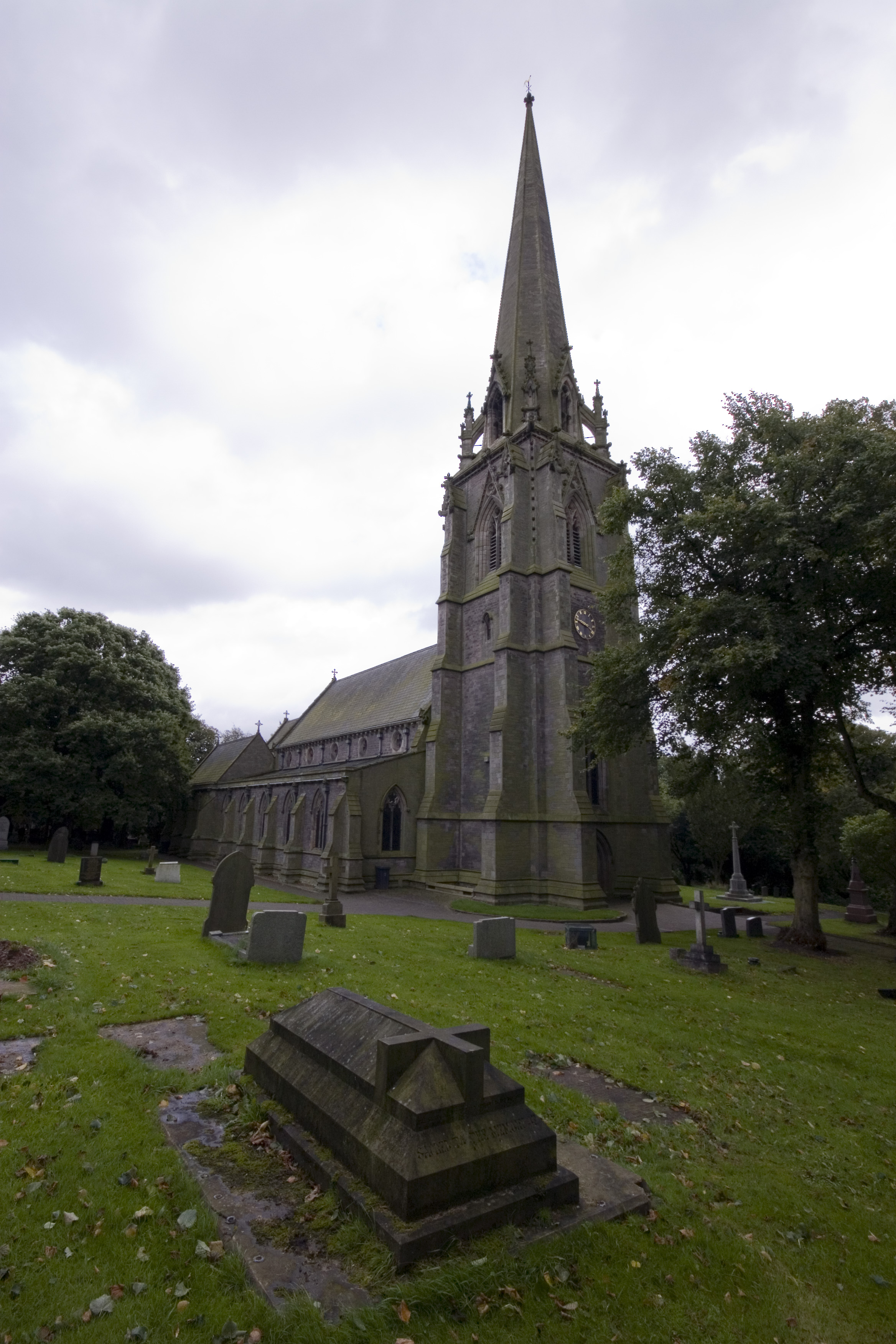
St Mark's Church, Worsley

Ellenbrook Chapel, the first church in Worsley was built in 1209 by the Worsley family. Methodism was first practised in the area in 1784, by the notable preacher Matthew Mayer. Later services were held in various locations around the area, and in 1801 a Methodist chapel was built along Barton Road. The foundation stone for St Mark's Church was laid on 14 June 1844 by George Granville Francis Egerton, the son of Francis Egerton. Designed by the architect George Gilbert Scott, the church was consecrated on 2 July 1846 by the Bishop of Chester, John Bird Sumner. The church tower is now home to the mechanism for the Bridgewater Clock from the Bridgewater workshops at Worsley Green. The clock strikes 13 times at 1 pm, originally so that workmen did not miss the end of their dinner break. Many gravestones in the churchyard were cut from rock sourced at Worsley Delph. Following a proposed hotel development in 1981 the area around the church and vicarage was designated a conservation area. In 2026, the derelict Roman Catholic St Joseph's Convent was destroyed by fire.

== Sports ==
Worsley Golf Club was founded in 1894 on part of the Earl of Ellesmere's estate at Broadoak Park. The area has a clay pigeon shooting club, west of the M60. A racecourse development proposed on land near Boothstown was the subject of a public inquiry and rejected by the local council after a sustained campaign by local councillors.

== Public services ==
Home Office policing in Worsley is provided by the Greater Manchester Police. The nearest police station is at Little Hulton or Swinton. Public transport is co-ordinated by Transport for Greater Manchester. Statutory emergency fire and rescue service is provided by the Greater Manchester Fire and Rescue Service.

== Notable people ==
- Francis Egerton, 1st Earl of Ellesmere (1800–1857), politician, writer, traveller and patron of the arts, lived in Worsley Old Hall.
- Christopher Walton (1809–1877), an English businessman, a writer on theosophy, (a religious movement).
- Guy Rowson (1883–1937), coal miner and politician, MP for Farnworth, 1929/1931 & 1935/1937
- Arthur Thomas Doodson (1890–1968), mathematician and oceanographer, born in Boothstown
- Sir Harry Campion (1905–1996), statistician, developed the official statistics after WW2, brought up locally.
- Helen Cherry (1915–2001), stage, film and TV actress,
- Kenneth Wolstenholme (1920–2002), TV sports commentator.
- James Fearnley (born 1954), English musician, he plays accordion in the Pogues, a Celtic punk band
- Tim Burgess (born 1967), musician, lead singer of the alternative rock band the Charlatans.
- Chris Addison (born 1971), comedian, writer, actor and director; has appeared on Mock the Week, brought up locally

=== Sport ===
- Johnny Tyldesley (1873–1930), cricketer who played 31 Test cricket games and 608 First-class cricket games
- Ernest Tyldesley (1889–1962), cricketer, played 14 Test cricket games and 648 First-class cricket games
- Ronnie Phillips (1947–2002), footballer who played over 350 games including 145 for Bolton Wanderers and 130 for Chester City
- Ryan Giggs (born 1973), footballer caused controversy in the mid-2000s when he bought a Victorian mansion on the outskirts of the village and demolished it to build a new house. The house was put on the market in 2019 with an asking price of £3.5m.
- David Beckham (born 1975) footballer, Giggs' former team-mate, also owned a property in Worsley until 2014.
- Adam Eckersley (born 1985), footballer who played 277 games.
- Phil Hamer (born 1990), professional ice hockey player who was arrested and jailed for sexual assault charges.

== See also ==
- Listed buildings in Worsley
- William Brereton (groom)
