= Orme and Sons =

English billiard table manufacturer

Orme and Sons were one of the most important billiard table manufacturers in England.

The company was founded in 1845, and but during the Great Depression they first amalgamated their distribution with Burroughs & Watts in 1931, before finally disappearing later on in the 1930s.

In 1933 the company was responsible for running 77 leagues across England and Ireland, with an estimated total of 15,400 players (average 200 players per league).

== See also ==
- List of sporting goods manufacturers
