= William Bramwell =

William Bramwell (c. February 1759 – 13 August 1818) was an English Methodist itinerant preacher who led a successful Christian revival in Yorkshire.

== Early life ==
Born in Elswick (near Preston), Lancashire, he was raised in a devout Anglican family. In pursuit of spiritual assurance, Bramwell first explored Roman Catholic devotions such as self-flagellation, before returning to the established Church of England and preparing for confirmation.

== Ministry ==
In Preston, a friend persuaded Bramwell to attend a Methodist meeting, where he was converted by the evangelical preaching; he soon enrolled as a member of a Methodist society in 1780. An encounter with Methodism's founder, John Wesley, in 1781 left a deep impression on Bramwell, and he took up local preaching – he was committed to promoting the novel Wesleyan doctrine of entire sanctification.

In 1785, Bramwell was admitted by Wesley into full-time ministry. He was stationed first in Liverpool for a brief period and then, successively, in Preston, Canterbury, Blackburn and Colne. In late 1791, Bramwell was stationed in the Dewsbury circuit, which was experiencing division. By the following year, such were the effects of his powerful preaching that a revival spread from the town and throughout West Yorkshire. This period of spiritual renewal (and mass conversion) began in 1793 and diminished around 1797.

Bramwell became a close associate of fellow minister Alexander Kilham. Amid the disarray following Wesley's death in 1791, Kilham founded the Methodist New Connexion, but Bramwell declined to join the new connexion and weakened its influence. Through his evangelism, Bramwell established several societies throughout the North of England, in numerous towns including Birstal and latterly Manchester. For all his success, however, his intense revivalist preaching style engendered controversy. Jabez Bunting, then the dominant authority of the Methodist connexion, had little sympathy with Bramwell's revivalist ministry and expressed desire for Bramwell and his supporters to follow other secessions from the Wesleyan Methodist Connexion.

He died suddenly in 1818, at the age of about 59.
