= List of schools in Salford =

This is a list of schools in the City of Salford in the English county of Greater Manchester.

== State-funded schools ==
=== Primary schools ===
- Barton Moss Community Primary School, Barton
- Beech Street Community Primary School, Winton
- Boothstown Methodist Primary School, Boothstown
- Brentnall Academy, Higher Broughton
- Bridgewater Primary School, Little Hulton
- Broadoak Primary School, Swinton
- Broughton Jewish Cassell Fox Primary School, Broughton
- Cadishead Primary School, Cadishead
- The Cathedral School of St Peter & St John RC, Salford
- Christ Church CE Primary School, Patricroft
- Christ The King RC Primary School, Walkden
- Clarendon Road Community Primary School, Eccles
- Clifton Primary School, Clifton
- The Deans Primary School, Swinton
- Dukesgate Academy, Little Hulton
- Ellenbrook Community Primary School, Ellenbrook, Worsley
- Fiddlers Lane Community Primary School, Irlam
- The Friars Primary School, Salford
- Godfrey Ermen Memorial CE Primary School, Barton
- Grosvenor Road Primary School, Swinton
- Hilton Lane Primary School, Little Hulton
- Holy Cross and All Saints' RC Primary School, Barton
- Holy Family RC Primary School, Salford
- Irlam Endowed Primary School, Irlam
- Irlam Primary School, Irlam
- James Brindley Community Primary School, Walkden
- Lark Hill Community Primary School, Salford
- Lewis Street Primary School, Patricroft
- Light Oaks Infant School, Pendleton
- Light Oaks Junior School, Pendleton
- Lower Kersal Community Primary School, Lower Kersal
- Marlborough Road Academy, Higher Broughton
- Mesne Lea Primary School, Walkden
- Monton Green Primary School, Monton, Eccles
- Moorside Primary School, Swinton
- Moss Valley Primary Academy, Irlam
- Mossfield Primary School, Newtown, Pendlebury
- North Walkden Primary School, Walkden
- Our Lady and Lancashire Martyrs' RC Primary School, Worsley
- Peel Hall Primary School, Little Hulton
- Primrose Hill Primary School, Ordsall
- River View Primary School, Salford
- St Andrew's CE Primary School, Boothstown
- St Andrew's CE Primary School, Eccles
- St Andrew's Methodist Primary School, Little Hulton
- St Augustine's CE Primary School, Pendlebury
- St Boniface's RC Primary School, Higher Broughton
- St Charles' RC Primary School, Moorside, Swinton
- St Edmund's RC Primary School, Little Hulton
- St George's CE Primary School, Charlestown, Pendleton
- St Gilbert's RC Primary School, Winton
- St John's CE Primary School, Pendlebury
- St Joseph The Worker RC Primary School, Irlam
- St Joseph's RC Primary School, Ordsall
- St Luke's RC Primary School, Irlams o' th' Height
- St Luke's RC Primary School, Salford
- St Mark's RC Primary School, Clifton
- St Mark's CE Primary School, Walkden
- St Mary's CE Primary School, Cadishead
- St Mary's RC Primary School, Eccles
- St Mary's RC Primary School, Swinton
- St Paul's CE Primary School, Kersal
- St Paul's CE Primary School, Salford
- St Paul's CE Primary School, Walkden
- St Paul's CE Primary School, Walkden
- St Paul's Peel CE Primary School, Little Hulton
- St Peter's CE Primary School, Swinton
- St Phillip's CE Primary School, Salford
- St Phillip's RC Primary School, Higher Broughton
- St Sebastian's RC Primary School, Charlestown, Pendleton
- St Teresa's RC Primary School, Irlam
- St Thomas of Canterbury RC Primary School, Higher Broughton
- Summerville Primary School, Irlams o' th' Height
- Wardley CE Primary School, Wardley, Swinton
- Westwood Park Community Primary School, Winton
- Wharton Primary School, Little Hulton
- Willow Tree Primary School, Salford

=== Secondary schools ===
- The Albion Academy, Pendleton
- Aldridge UTC@MediaCityUK, Salford Quays
- All Hallows RC High School, Weaste
- Beis Yaakov High School, Higher Broughton
- Buile Hill Academy, Pendleton
- Co-op Academy Swinton, Pendlebury
- Co-op Academy Walkden, Walkden
- Ellesmere Park High School, Ellesmere Park
- Irlam and Cadishead Academy, Irlam
- The Lowry Academy, Walkden
- Moorside High School, Swinton
- Oasis Academy MediaCityUK, Salford Quays
- St Ambrose Barlow RC High School, Wardley
- St Patrick's RC High School, Peel Green
- Salford City Academy, Peel Green
- Star Salford Academy, Worsley

=== Special and alternative schools ===
- Alder Brook, Winton
- Arbour Academy, Eccles
- The Clifton Centre, Clifton
- Chatsworth High School, Ellesmere Park
- The New Broadwalk PRU, Salford
- New Park Academy, Patricroft
- Oakwood Academy, Ellesmere Park
- Springwood Primary School, Swinton

=== Further education ===
- Salford City College

== Independent schools ==
=== Primary and preparatory schools ===
- Ateres Elisheva, Broughton
- Beis Rochel Mcr Girls' School, Higher Broughton
- Bnos Margulis Viznitz Girls' School, Higher Broughton
- Branwood Preparatory School, Monton, Eccles
- Clarendon Cottage School, Eccles
- Kerem Shloime, Salford
- Manchester Jewish Community High School, Salford
- Manchester Junior Girls' School, Salford
- Talmud Torah Chinuch Norim School, Higher Broughton
- Talmud Torah D'chassidie Belz, Broughton
- Talmud Torah Yetev Lev, Salford
- Tashbar of Manchester, Broughton Park
- Toras Emes, Salford
- Toras Moshe, Salford

=== Senior and all-through schools ===
- Ahavas Torah Boys Academy, Pendleton
- Beis Hatalmud School, Broughton
- Beis Malka Girls School, Higher Broughton
- Beis Ruchel Girls School, Broughton
- Bnos Yisroel School, Higher Broughton
- Bridgewater School, Worsley
- Etz Chaim Boys School, Higher Broughton
- Manchester Senior Girls School, Salford
- Mechinoh School, Broughton
- Oholei Yosef Yitzchok Lubavitch Schools, Broughton Park
- OYY Lubavitch Boys School, Broughton Park
- Tiferes, Broughton

=== Special and alternative schools ===
- Aim Habonim, Higher Broughton
- Edstart, Charlestown, Pendleton
