= Turnpike trusts in Greater Manchester =

Turnpike trusts were bodies set up by acts of Parliament during the 18th and 19th centuries. The trusts had powers to collect road tolls for the maintenance of principal highways. The length of turnpike roads within what is now Greater Manchester varied considerably, from the 0.5 miles (0.8 km) Little Lever Trust, to the 22 miles (35 km) Manchester to Saltersbrook Trust.

Turnpikes contributed significantly to England's economic development before and during the Industrial Revolution. Although the trusts were abolished in the late-19th century, the roads themselves broadly remain as modern routes, and some of the original toll houses and roadside milestones have survived.

The metropolitan county of Greater Manchester was created in 1974 and so the turnpike trusts predate its existence. Greater Manchester lies at the conjunction of the historic county boundaries of Cheshire, Derbyshire, Lancashire and Yorkshire; many trusts operated roads which crossed those ancient county boundaries. The list below is divided according to historic county, with the first part of the name of each trust determining which table it appears in.

== History ==
Method of construction and the design of the road surface varied. Before construction of its road, the Bury, Blackburn and Whalley Trust engaged "skilled persons" as temporary surveyors, to make a survey of the districts through which the road would pass. It then advertised for tenders for construction of varied parts of the roads, with contractors responsible for building their respective portions, under the supervision of permanent surveyors. The trust bought limestone for the road surface largely from limestone quarries in Clitheroe. In Manchester, Liverpool, and Wigan, due to heavy coal traffic it was necessary to lay pavements of large stones along the roads. Suitable material would, if not found in the vicinity, be imported from the coasts of Wales and Scotland. Normally the pavement ran down the middle of the road, with a gravelled way on either side. An exception was along Bury New Road (built in 1826), where the middle track was 4 yards (3.7 m) of gravel, with stone pavements 3 yards (2.7 m) outside it. Such pavements were expensive, and unpopular with travellers who regularly described their discomfort travelling upon them.

Toll rates varied across the region, but preferential rates were often available to local residents, and for particular kinds of local traffic. The 1819 act of Parliament of the Crossford Bridge and Manchester Trust, the Road from Crossford Bridge to Manchester Act 1819 (59 Geo. 3. c. lvi), allowed it to charge half tolls on the inhabitants and occupiers of Trafford House, Old Trafford, and Stretford Moss. The Bolton and Westhoughton Trust allowed farmers from Rumworth and Westhoughton to use the roads free of charge, when taking horses and carts laden with produce from their own farms to Bolton Market. Carriage of coal was often charged at half the normal rate, and no tolls were payable by persons travelling on foot. Other road users who were entitled to free passage included posthorses, carriage of ordnance and military stores, and cattle going to pasture.

Turnpike roads had a huge impact on the nature of business transport around Manchester. Packhorses were superseded by waggons, and merchants would no longer accompany their caravans to markets and fairs, instead sending agents with samples, and despatching the goods at a later date. In 1804 it was said that Manchester employed more than 120 "land carriers".

The railway era spelt disaster for most turnpike trusts. Although some trusts in districts not served by railways managed to increase revenue, most did not. In 1829, the year before the Liverpool and Manchester Railway opened, the Warrington and Lower Irlam Trust had receipts of £1,680, but by 1834 this had fallen to £332. The Bolton and Blackburn Trust had an income of £3,998 in 1846, but in 1847 following the completion of a railway between the two towns this had fallen to £3,077, and in 1849 £1,185.

The end of the turnpike system created serious problems for the local parishes and highway district boards upon whom the burden of maintenance fell. The Local Government Act 1888 made the repair of all main roads the responsibility of the new county councils. Lancashire County Council determined that any road leading to a town with a population of 25,000 or more would become a main road, which included almost all of the old turnpike roads in the region.

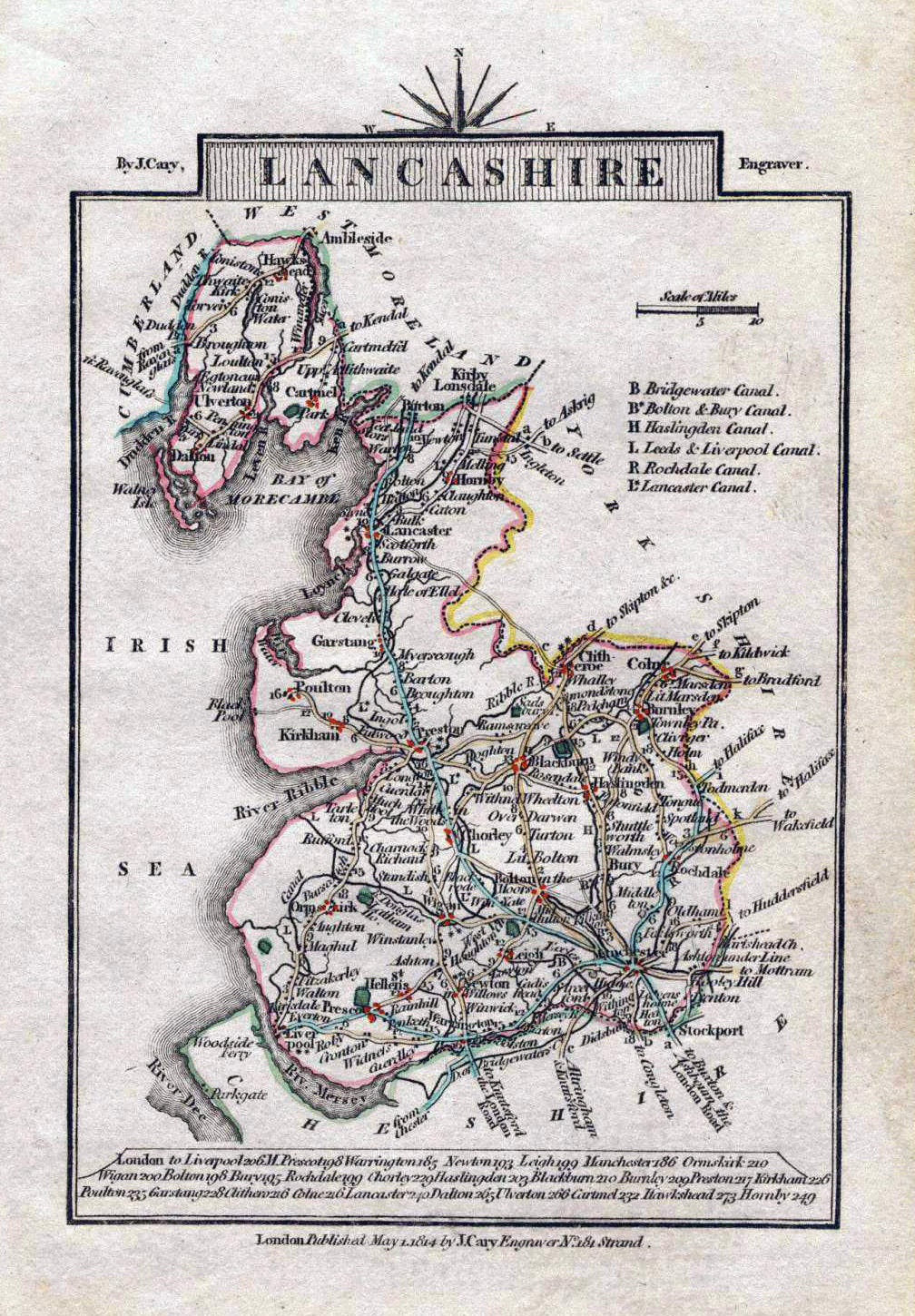
An 1814 map of Lancashire by John Cary which shows many of the turnpike roads.

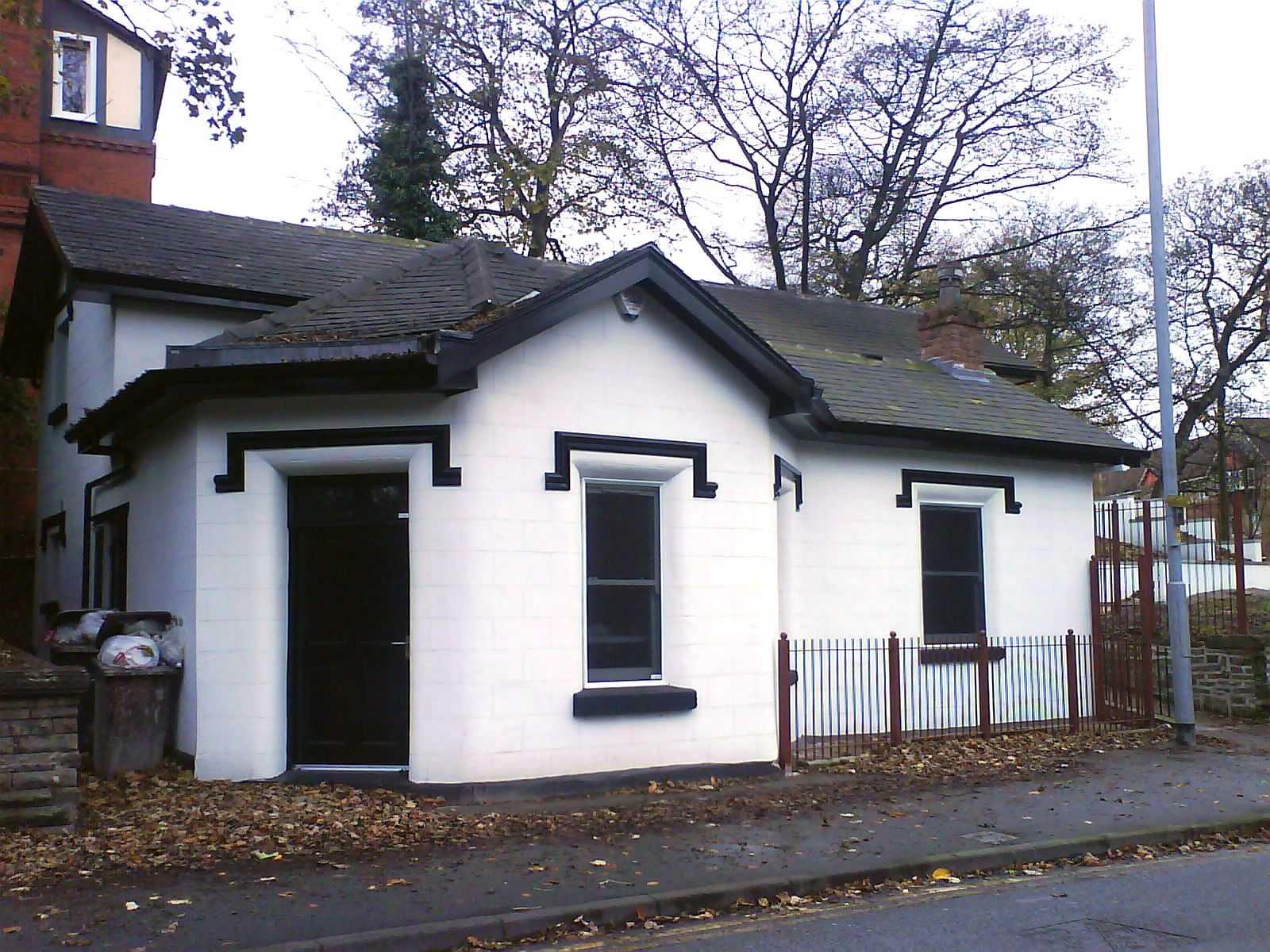
The Grade II listed Kersal Bar Toll House, along the Manchester and Bury New Road turnpike road.

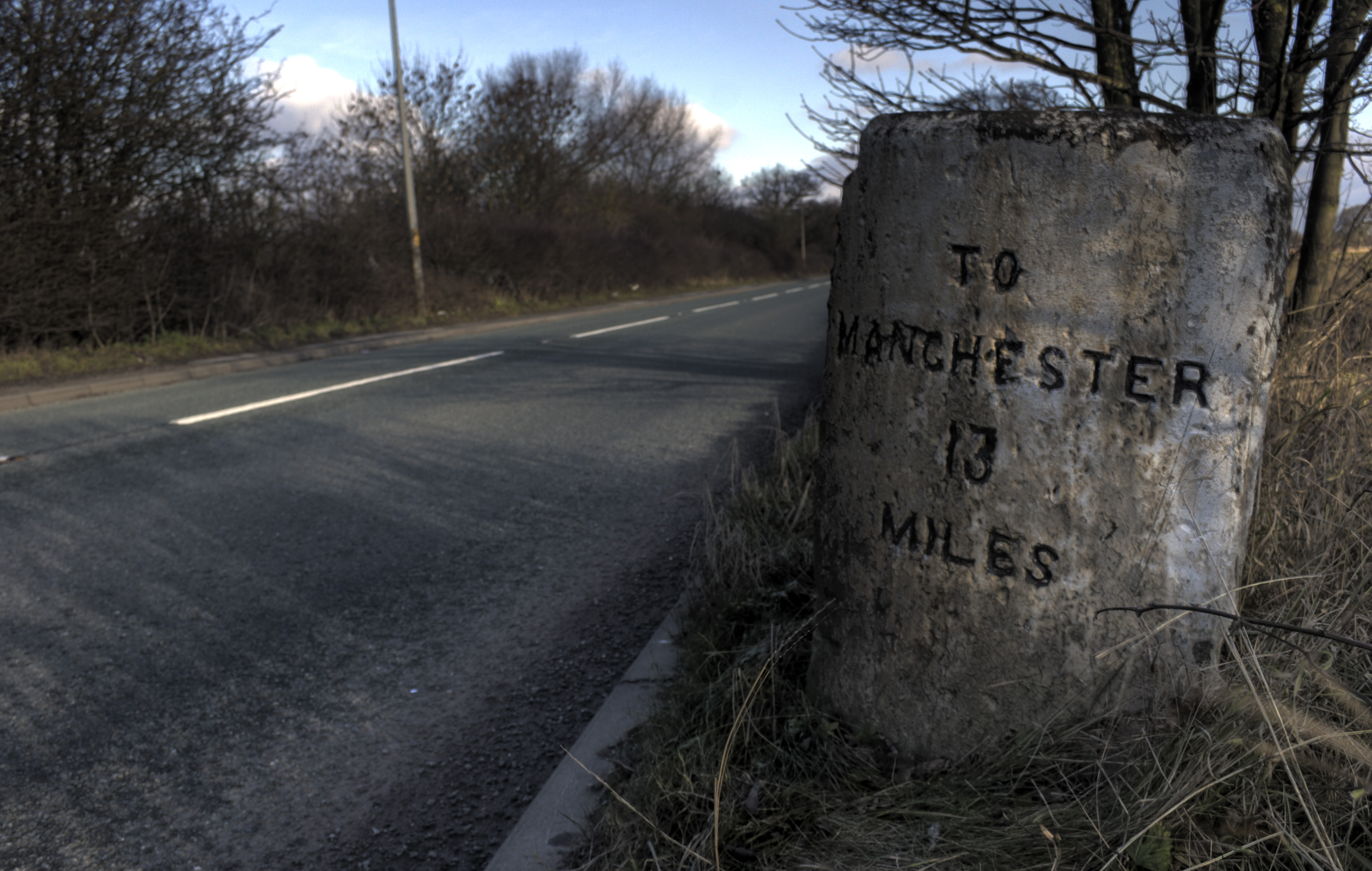
A milestone along the Warrington and Lower Irlam turnpike road, near Rixton. The opposite side gives the distance to Warrington.

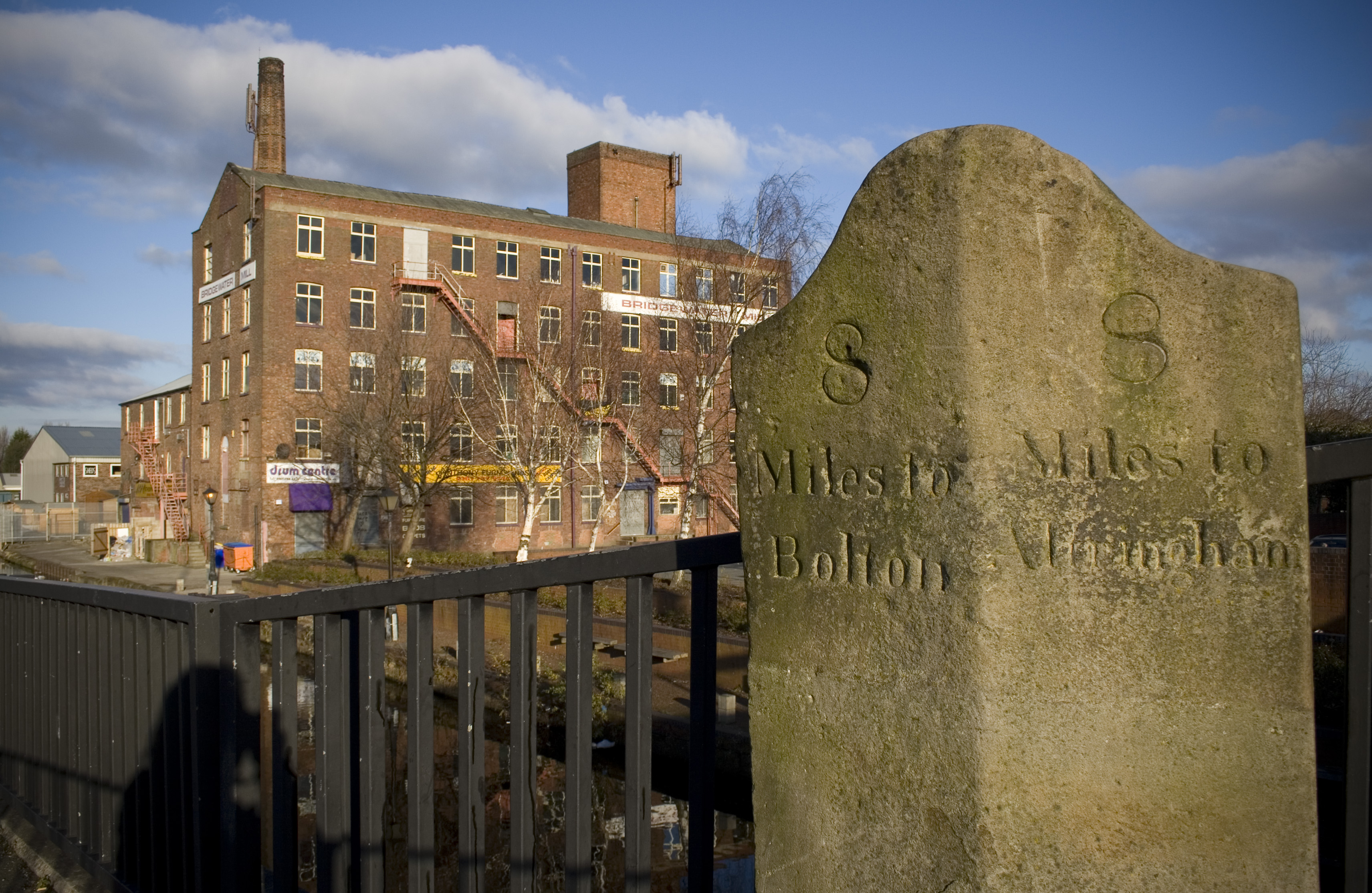
A milestone on Patricroft Bridge, along the Barton and Moses Gate turnpike road, near Eccles. Note the older spelling of 'Altringham' - latterly Altrincham.

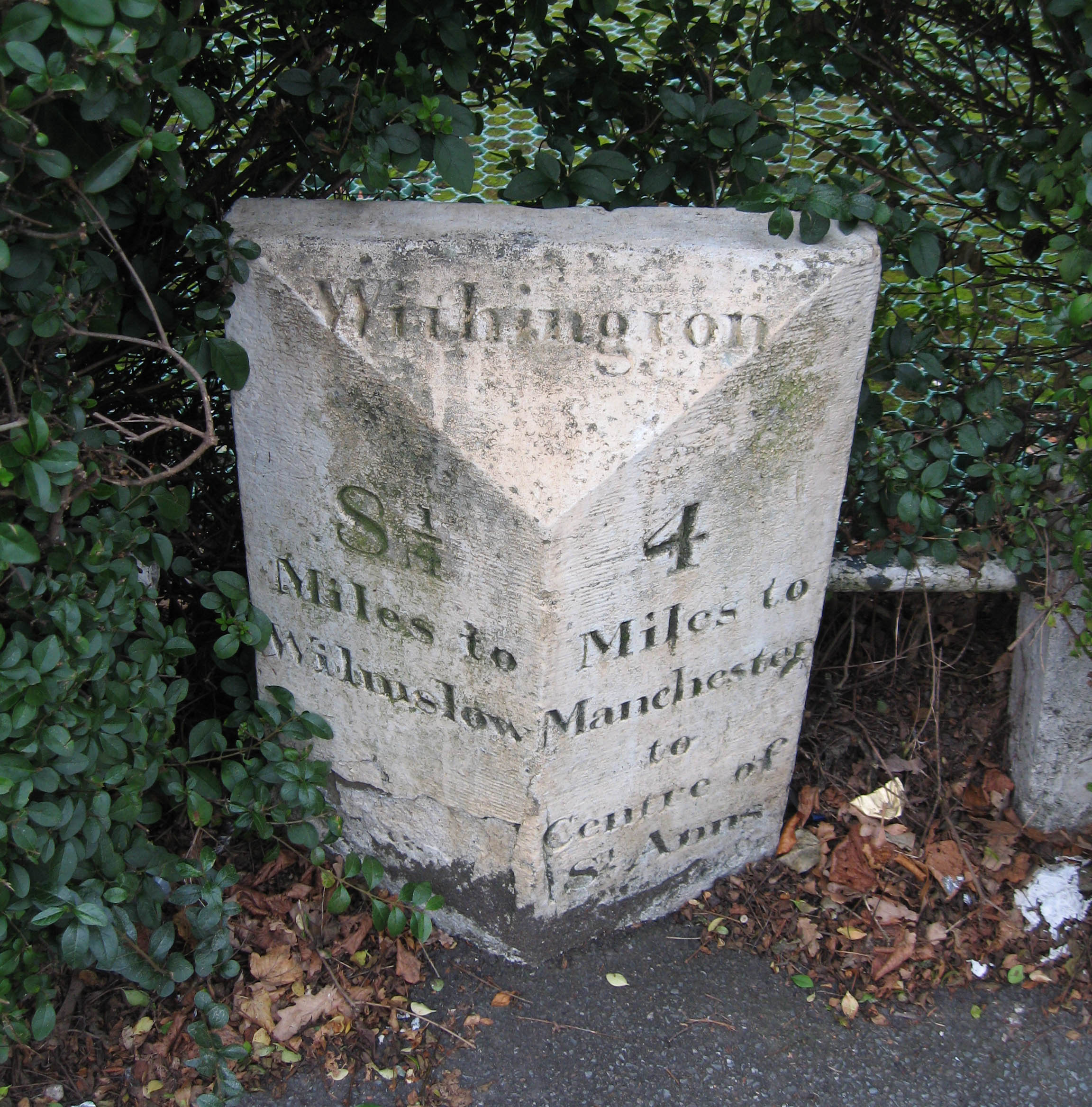
A milestone along the Manchester to Wilmslow turnpike road, in Withington

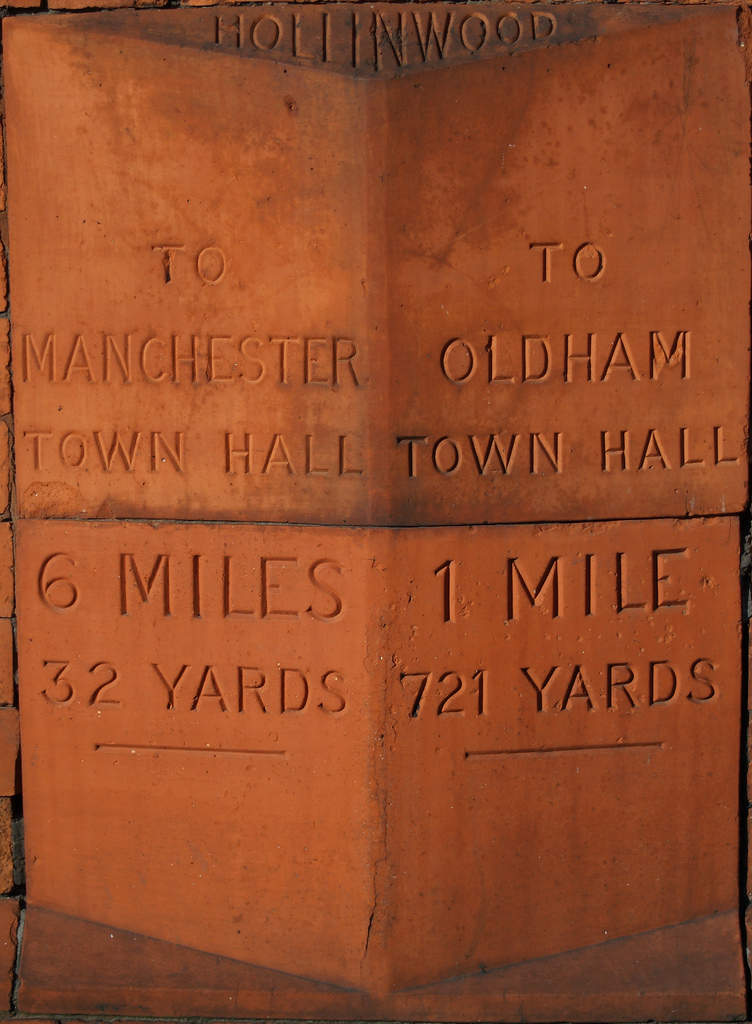
This milestone, part of the Smut Inn public house, indicates the distance between Oldham and Manchester Town Hall.

== Cheshire ==
Name	Interest	Income	Length (1848)	Main gates	Side gates	Act	Year	Date expired	County	Modern road(s)
Cranage Green to Altrincham						26 Geo. 2. c. 26	1753	1881	Cheshire	
Stockport to Marple Bridge			10 miles (16 km) (1852)	5	1 (chain)	41 Geo. 3. (U.K.) c. xcviii	1801		Cheshire & Derbys	A626
Washway (Crossford Bridge to Altringham)			3 miles, 4 furlongs, 164 yards (5.8 km) (1852)							

== Derbyshire ==
Name	Interest	Income	Length (1848)	Main gates	Side gates	Act	Year	Date expired	County	Modern road(s)
Glossop to Marple Bridge						43 Geo. 3. c. xviii	1803		Derbys	

== Lancashire ==
Name	Interest	Income	Length (1848)	Main gates	Side gates	Act	Year	Date expired	County	Modern road(s)
Adlington and Westhoughton Trust		£201, 14s, 10d							Lancs	A6
Ashton and Platt Bridge		£175 13s 6d	3 miles 4 furlongs (5.6 km)			46 Geo. 3. c. ii	1806		Lancs	A58
Ashton under Lyne to Saddleworth						7 Geo. 4. c. xxi	1826		Lancs & Yorks	
Barton Bridge and Moses Gate		£933 13s 4d	13 miles 1 furlong 110 yards (21.2 km)							
Barton Bridge and Stretford		£300 19s	4 miles 3 furlongs 2 yards (7 km)			51 Geo. 3. c. xxxi	1811		Lancs	Barton Road, Stretford (partial)
Bolton and Blackburn		£1,267 6d	12 miles 5 furlongs 41 yards (20.4 km)							A666
Bolton and Nightingale		£1,755 10s 9d	19 miles (30.6 km)							A673 A6099; B6226; Smithills Dean Road; Colliers Row Road; Scout Road
Bolton and St Helens			17 miles 2 furlongs 44 yards (27.8 km)	5	8					A6 A579; B5215
Bolton and Westhoughton			2 miles 7 furlongs (4.6 km)							Bolton Road; A58 A676
Bolton to Haslingdon (dormant)						6 Geo. 4. c. xcii	1825	Dormant	Lancs	
Bolton to Leigh						2 Geo. 3. c. 44	1762		Lancs	
Burnley to Tottington						32 Geo. 3. c. 146	1795		Lancs	
Bury to Little Bolton			5 miles 4 furlongs 176 yards (9 km)	3	4	1 & 2 Geo. 4. c. xc	1821		Lancs	A58
Bury to Blackburn, Whalley etc.			33 miles 5 furlongs 9 yards (54.1 km)							
Bury to Haslingden to Blackburn						29 Geo. 3. c. 107	1789		Lancs	A56
Dryclough, Shaw, Rochdale			10 miles 7 furlongs 102 yards (17.6 km)				1805		Lancs	A669
Eccles to Farnworth										
Edenfield and Little Bolton							1797			B6213
Edenfield Chapel and Bury Bridge										
Elton and Blackburn			12 miles 6 furlongs (20.5 km)							B6214
Gilda Brook and Irlam			7 miles 7 furlongs 173 yards (12.8 km)							B5320
Heath Charnock to Bolton						3 Geo. 3. c. 31	1763		Lancs	
Heywood to Heaton						29 Geo. 3. c. 110	1789			
Hulme and Eccles			3 miles 5 furlongs 214 yards (6 km)			46 Geo. 3. c. ii	22 March 1806		Lancs	A56
Hulme and Stretford			5 miles 4 furlongs 183 yards (9 km)							A56
Hulton			5 miles 20 yards (8.1 km)							
Ince, Hindley and Westhoughton			6 miles (9.7 km)							A577; A58
Irlams o' th' Height			3 miles 7 furlongs 87 yards (6.3 km)							A666
Little Lever			4 furlongs (0.8 km)		1	5 Geo. 4. c. cxliii	1824	1849 (disturnpiked)		A6053
Manchester and Ashton under Lyne			3 miles 7 furlongs (6.2 km)			6 Geo. 4. c. li	1825		Lancs	
Manchester and Bury										A56
Manchester and Oldham and Austerlands			19 miles 1 furlong (30.8 km)			8 Geo. 2. c. 3	1735	1880	Lancs & Yorks	
Manchester to Bolton										
Manchester to Newton Chapel (dormant)						57 Geo. 3. c. xlvii	1817	Dormant	Lancs	
Manchester to Pilkington										
Manchester to Rochdale, Bury and Radcliffe			5 miles 7 furlongs (9.5 km)			28 Geo. 2. c. 58	1755	1873-80	Lancs	A665
Manchester to Saltersbrook			22 miles (35.4 km)			5 Geo. 2. c. 10	1732	1884	Lancs & Cheshire	A635
Manchester, Denton, Stockport						58 Geo. 3. c. vi	1818		Lancs & Cheshire	
Mather Fold and Hardmans, Moses Gate District			3 miles 2 furlongs (5.2 km)							
Mather Fold and Hardmans, Ringley District			3 miles 6 furlongs (6 km)							A667
Pendleton Trust Agecroft District		£300	4 miles 187 yards (6.6 km)							A6044; Moor Lane; Singleton Road
Pendleton Trust Irlam's-o'-th'-Heights District										A666
Pendleton Trust Pendleton District			2 miles 2 furlongs (3.6 km)							A6
Pendleton Trust Swinton District			5 miles 2 furlongs (8.5 km)							A572
Prestwich and Bury			5 miles 3 furlongs (8.7 km)							A667 A665; A56; Stand Lane
Radcliffe			6 miles 1 furlongs (9.9 km)							A665
Rochdale and Burnley			18 miles 4 furlongs (29.8 km)			28 Geo. 2. c. 53	1755	1880	Lancs	
Rochdale and Edenfield			7 miles (11.3 km)			34 Geo. 3. c. 124	1794		Lancs	A680
Rochdale and Manchester, Manchester District										A579
Rochdale and Manchester, Rochdale District										A664
Rochdale, Bamford and Bury			7 miles 4 furlongs (12.1 km)				1797	1866	Lancs	Norden Road; Bagslate Moor Road
Salford to Wigan						26 Geo. 2. c. 27	1753		Lancs	
Sharples and Hoghton			10 miles 4 furlongs (16.9 km) (1848)	3 (1852)		41 Geo. 3. (U.K.). c. cxxiii				A675
Standedge and Oldham			10 miles 7 furlongs (17.5 km)							
Stretford to Manchester						24 Geo. 2. c. 13	1751	1872	Lancs	
Sudden Bridge to Bury			4 miles 6 furlongs (7.6 km)				1797		Lancs	A58
Swinton District			5 miles 2 furlongs (8.4 km)							A572
Warrington and Lower Irlam			7 miles 5 furlongs (12.3 km)							A57
Warrington and Wigan			11 miles 2 furlongs (18.1 km)			13 Geo. 1. c. 10	1727		Lancs	
Radcliffe to Bolton & Bury						6 & 7 Will. 4. c. x	1836		Lancs	
Wigan and Preston, south of (River) Yarrow			12 miles 6 furlongs (20.5 km)			13 Geo. 1. c. 9	1727	1866-67	Lancs	A49
Manchester and Buxton						11 Geo. 1. c. 13	1725	1860-75 earliest record 1759	Lancs & Derbys	B5470
Stockport and Ashton						5 Geo. 3. c. 100	1765		Lancs & Cheshire	
Stockport and Warrington						1 Geo. 4. c. xxviii	1820		Lancs & Cheshire	A560
Stockport and Warrington (Edgley Branch)										
Wilmslow						26 Geo. 2. c. 53	1753	1881	Lancs & Cheshire	B5167
Worsley Trust										A572 A5082

== Yorkshire ==
Name	Interest	Income	Length (1848)	Main gates	Side gates	Act	Year	Date expired	County	Modern road(s)
Halifax to Littleborough						33 Geo. 2. c. 48	1760		Yorks & Lancs	
Oldham and Ripponden			16 miles 7 furlongs (27.2 km)			35 Geo. 3. c. 137	1795		Yorks & Lancs	
Rochdale to Halifax and Elland						8 Geo. 2. c. 7	1735	1872	Yorks	
Saddleworth to Oldham						32 Geo. 3. c. 139	1792		Yorks & Lancs	
