= Blackleach Country Park =

Country park in Walkden, Greater Manchester, England

Coordinates: 53.533°N 2.395°W

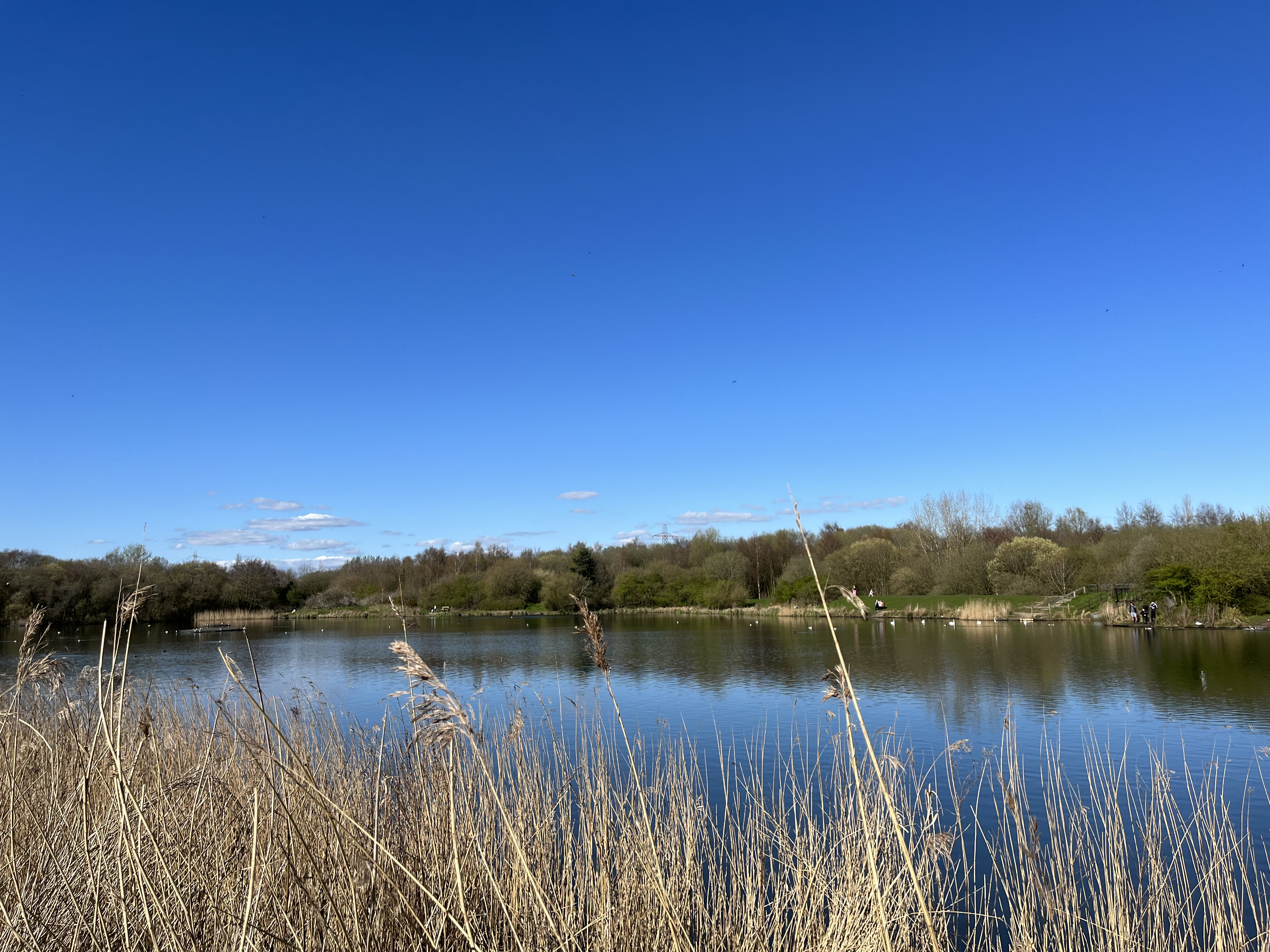
Reservoir at Blackleach Country Park.

Blackleach Country Park is a country park in Walkden, Greater Manchester. It is situated half a mile from the town centre just off Bolton Road in the Hill Top area. It is a Local Nature Reserve and a winner of the Green Flag Award.

The park is mainly used by residents as a leisure destination (running, walking, dog walking, angling) but has gained increasing regional recognition following the establishment of a local ranger group, who now regularly maintain the space.

== History ==
Local historic accounts state that the reservoir was originally built to power local colliery activity. Blackleach Reservoir (originally 10 acres) was built in 1794. This was subsequently doubled in size in the 1840s. Only this newer portion remains forming the Blackleach Country Park, the original was infilled in the 1960s to protect the motorway.

Later, the site was used for brick making and finally as a chemical factory making Salford’s distinctive magenta dye. Industrial activity ended in 1976 and the site was abandoned to nature.

In 1987 the reservoirs were earmarked for housing but a campaign led by local action groups saved the site and in 1992 the Salford Rangers Service began to transform Blackleach from a desolate wasteland in to its premier wildlife reserve. The Greater Manchester Ecology Unit designates Blackleach as a Site of Biological Importance because of its habitats and resident species, and 2004 English Nature declared it a Local Nature Reserve.

== Facilities ==
The Salford City Council page for the park says that it is equipped with several facilities including:

- Car parking
- Fishing
- Lake
- Orienteering
- Toilets
- Visitor centre

There is currently no onsite café facility, but food and drink can be purchased locally in cafés on Bolton Road or at Walkden Town Centre.

== Friends of Blackleach ==
The Friends of Blackleach are the local voluntary group who together with the Salford Ranger Team help to manage and maintain the country park.

This group meets on a regular basis and discuss future projects and management of the site.

== Looplines ==
Blackleach Country Park is linked to a network of former railway lines that have been repurposed as walking and cycling paths. Notably, the Linnyshaw Loopline, a disused railway corridor running between Little Hulton and Walkden, passes through or alongside the park and forms part of the wider loopline network of former industrial rail routes in the Salford area.

These looplines, once associated with local industrial and collieries rail traffic, now provide off-road shared-use paths for leisure and commuting, enhancing access to Blackleach and connecting it with adjacent green spaces such as Ashton’s Field and the Roe Green Loopline. The route is managed as part of Salford’s urban walking and cycling infrastructure and is frequently used by walkers, cyclists and organised groups exploring the park and its surroundings.

== Local Transport ==
=== Train ===
Blackleach Country Park is about one mile from Walkden train station.

=== Buses ===
==== Closest Stop: Hill Top Road (approximately 4 minute walk) ====
Several buses stop on Hill Top Road or Bolton Road close to Blackleach Country Park, providing the nearest public transport access point according to journey planners:

- Bus 37 – Bolton ↔ Manchester (serving Walkden / Bolton Road area)
- Bus 36 – Manchester ↔ Bolton (runs through Walkden area)
- Bus 38 – Logistics North / Piccadilly Gardens circular via Swinton and Salford (stops along Bolton Road / Walkden)

==== Walkden Town Centre Stops (approximately 10–15 min walk) ====
Walkden Town Centre is a nearby transport hub (around a 10–15 minute walk uphill from the park) where multiple Bee Network buses serve Bolton Road and surrounding streets. These include:

- Bus 36 – Manchester ↔ Bolton (Bee Network service) Transport for Greater Manchester
- Bus 37 – Bolton ↔ Manchester (Bee Network service) Transport for Greater Manchester
- Bus 38 – Logistics North ↔ Piccadilly Gardens via Salford and Swinton (Bee Network service) Transport for Greater Manchester

Walkden Town Centre is the nearest larger public transport interchange served by multiple bus lines, enabling wider connections from across Greater Manchester.

=== Car/Motorcycle ===
There is a small car park with around 30 spaces. Parking is also available on surrounding residential streets.
