= Co-op Academy Walkden =

Coordinates: 53.5061°N 2.3503°W

Location
- 211 Old Clough Lane; Walkden, Greater Manchester, M28 7JB; England

Information
- Type: Academy
- Local authority: Salford
- Department for Education URN: 146404 Tables
- Ofsted: Reports
- Principal: Matt Hacker
- Gender: Mixed
- Age: 11 to 16
- Enrolment: 1436
- Capacity: 1500 Learners
- Website: walkden.coopacademies.co.uk

Co-op Academy Walkden is a secondary school in Walkden, Greater Manchester. Formerly on Birch Road, the school is now located on Old Clough Lane, and serves Walkden, Worsley, Linnyshaw, Roe Green, Ellenbrook and Boothstown.

In September 2011, the school moved into a new building off Old Clough Lane as part of the government's BSF (Building Schools for the Future) agenda, a process whose early planning stages had begun in November 2006. The culmination of that work is a building that offers accommodation for 1,500 pupils.

The new building is available for the community to use during out-of-school hours and this is managed by Salford Community Leisure.

Formerly known as Walkden High School, the school converted to academy status in December 2018 joining the Co-op Academies Trust.

== Notable former pupils ==
- David Atkins - actor; known for his role as Rob Edwards in the Channel 4 soap opera Hollyoaks, and two episodes of Doctor Who in 2010.
- Aidan Barlow - footballer; plays for Manchester United
- Joe Davies – first-class cricketer
- Jason Done – actor; plays Tom Clarkson in Waterloo Road
- Richard Eckersley - former professional football player for Burnley FC
- Alan Halsall – actor; has played Tyrone Dobbs in UK soap opera Coronation Street since 1998.
- John McAtee – footballer; plays for Shrewsbury
- Sacha Parkinson – actress; plays Sian Powers in UK soap opera Coronation Street
- Joe Riley – footballer; plays for Bury
- Helena Worthington - reality TV.
