= Ellesmere Colliery =

Former coal mine in Walkden, Manchester, England

Coordinates: 53.5235°N 2.4018°W

Aerial view of Ellesmere Colliery, 1947 or earlier

Ellesmere Colliery was a coal mine in Walkden, Manchester, England. The pit was located on Manchester Road, a short distance south of Walkden town centre.

There were three shafts on the colliery site, with a fourth upcast shaft located a distance to the NNW. No. 1 shaft was sunk to the Five Quarters mine at a depth of 252 metres (276 yd). The 250-metre (273 yd) deep No. 2 shaft and 377-metre (412 yd) No. 3 shaft were located on either side of the engine house. The c.1866 engine house contained a central ventilator and the winding engine was from local iron founder's Nasmyth Wilson, which powered a 30-inch by 54-inch winder. It wound one cage in each shaft and the winding drum had a stepped 4.3-metre (14 ft) and 3.0-metre (10 ft) diameter to cater for the differing depths. The 1800s wooden headgear was replaced with metal structures in the 20th century, with one surviving until 1955. At least one of the shafts intersected the underground canal of the Worsley Navigable Levels, and although coal winding ceased in 1921 it was retained for water pumping and ventilation.

The colliery was served by the Bridgewater Collieries Railway, which connected other lines such as the LNWR and also to the Bridgewater Canal. The Walkden Yard maintenance depot was later constructed on the western side of the pit. The Walkden offices of the company were also located to the southwest of the site.

Bridgewater merged with others to form Manchester Collieries in 1929. The electrification of Ellesmere engine plant in 1936 led to the closure of the nearby Roughfield Colliery. Pumping continued until 1968 and after the National Coal Board demolished the buildings at both sites and the shafts were filled-in. Sometime later a violent explosion occurred in a house in Walkden caused by firedamp accumulating underground and eventually forcing its way to the surface. To prevent a recurrence a borehole was drilled down No.1 shaft and a methane extraction plant built at the top.
