= Joe Davies (cricketer) =

English cricketer (born 1992)

Personal information
- Full name: Joseph Matthew Davies
- Born: 5 September 1992 (age 34); Salford, Lancashire, England
- Height: 5 ft 10 in (1.78 m)
- Batting: Right-handed
- Role: Wicket-keeper

Domestic team information
- Years: Team
- 2012–2014: Oxford University

Career statistics
Competition	First-class
Matches	2
Runs scored	38
Batting average	12.66
100s/50s	–/–
Top score	31
Catches/stumpings	4/–
- Source: Cricinfo, 26 February 2020

Joseph Matthew Davies (born 5 September 1992) is an English former first-class cricketer.

Davies was born at Salford in September 1992. He was educated at Walkden High School, and St Catherine's College, Oxford. Joseph previously represented Lancashire County Cricket Club up to 2nd XI and England U15 and U16. While studying at Oxford, he played first-class cricket for Oxford University, making two appearances against Cambridge University in The University Matches of 2012 and 2014. Playing as a wicket-keeper, he scored 38 runs with a high score of 31, in addition to taking four catches.

More recently, Davies plays cricket at Scalby CC based in Scarborough, North Yorkshire. Here he plays as a batsman and as a right arm spinner. Alongside this, Davies shows promise as a Rugby Union player. He helped Scarborough RUFC gain promotion to Regional NE 1 in the 2025/26 season.

Davies is a wicketkeeping coach at Scarborough College, where he is also Head of Science. Davies has become Head of Biology at Manchester Grammar School as of September 2026.
