= Kay Hawke =

English footballer

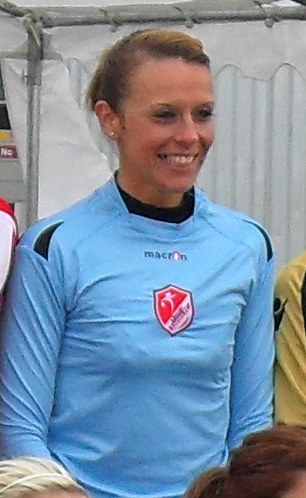
- Hawke in September 2010

Personal information
- Full name: Kay Joyce Hawke
- Date of birth: 28 March 1983 (age 43)
- Place of birth: Walkden, England
- Height: 1.80 m (5 ft 11 in)
- Position: Goalkeeper

Youth career
- Salford Girls
- Stalybridge Celtic

Senior career*
Years	Team	Apps	(Gls)
2000–2005	Oldham Curzon Ladies		
2005–2007	Blackburn Rovers Ladies		
2007–2012	Lincoln Ladies		
2009	→ Ventura County Fusion (loan)		
2010	→ Leeds United Ladies (loan)		

International career^{‡}
- England Under-21
2008	England	1	(0)
- * Club domestic league appearances and goals ‡ National team caps and goals as of 14 February 2008 (UTC)

Kay Joyce Hawke (born 28 March 1983) is an English footballer, who most recently played as a goalkeeper for Lincoln Ladies in the FA WSL. During her career she has played for Blackburn Rovers, Lincoln Ladies and Ventura County Fusion in California, USA. She has played for England at Under 21, Under 23 and full senior international level in her career.

== Club career ==
Hawke joined Lincoln from Blackburn Rovers Ladies in the summer of 2007. She had joined Blackburn in 2005 and won her first league championship (Northern Premier) that season.

In a September 2009 Premier League Cup match against Birmingham City, Hawke scored with an enormous clearance but was then controversially sent-off for handling outside her area. Lincoln went on to lose 6–2.

While preparing for the 2011 FA Women's Super League season with Lincoln, Hawke joined Leeds United on loan in August 2010. FA Women's Premier League National Division Leeds had a goalkeeper crisis after Carly Telford departed and Jules Draycott was injured. Hawke left Lincoln before the 2012 WSL season.

=== United States ===
In May 2009 Hawke joined Ventura County Fusion in California with the permission of Lincoln Ladies to play against teams in the Central and Western U.S.A and also Canada, she was made captain of the team upon arrival. She was voted as the goalkeeper for the Western Conference All Star IX for the season 2009/10.

== International career ==
Hawke's international debut was against Sweden at U21 level on 1 October 2004. The match took place at Örjans Vall, home ground of Swedish side Halmstads BK, and ended 1–0 to England, giving Hawke an international debut clean sheet. Having played football for England at U21 and U23 level Hawke finally made her full debut for England on 14 February 2008 against Norway in Cyprus. She replaced Siobhan Chamberlain. Hawke has England legacy number 166. The FA announced their legacy numbers scheme to honour the 50th anniversary of England’s inaugural international.
