= Walkden =

Town in City of Salford, Greater Manchester, England

Coordinates: 53.524°N 2.399°W

- Town
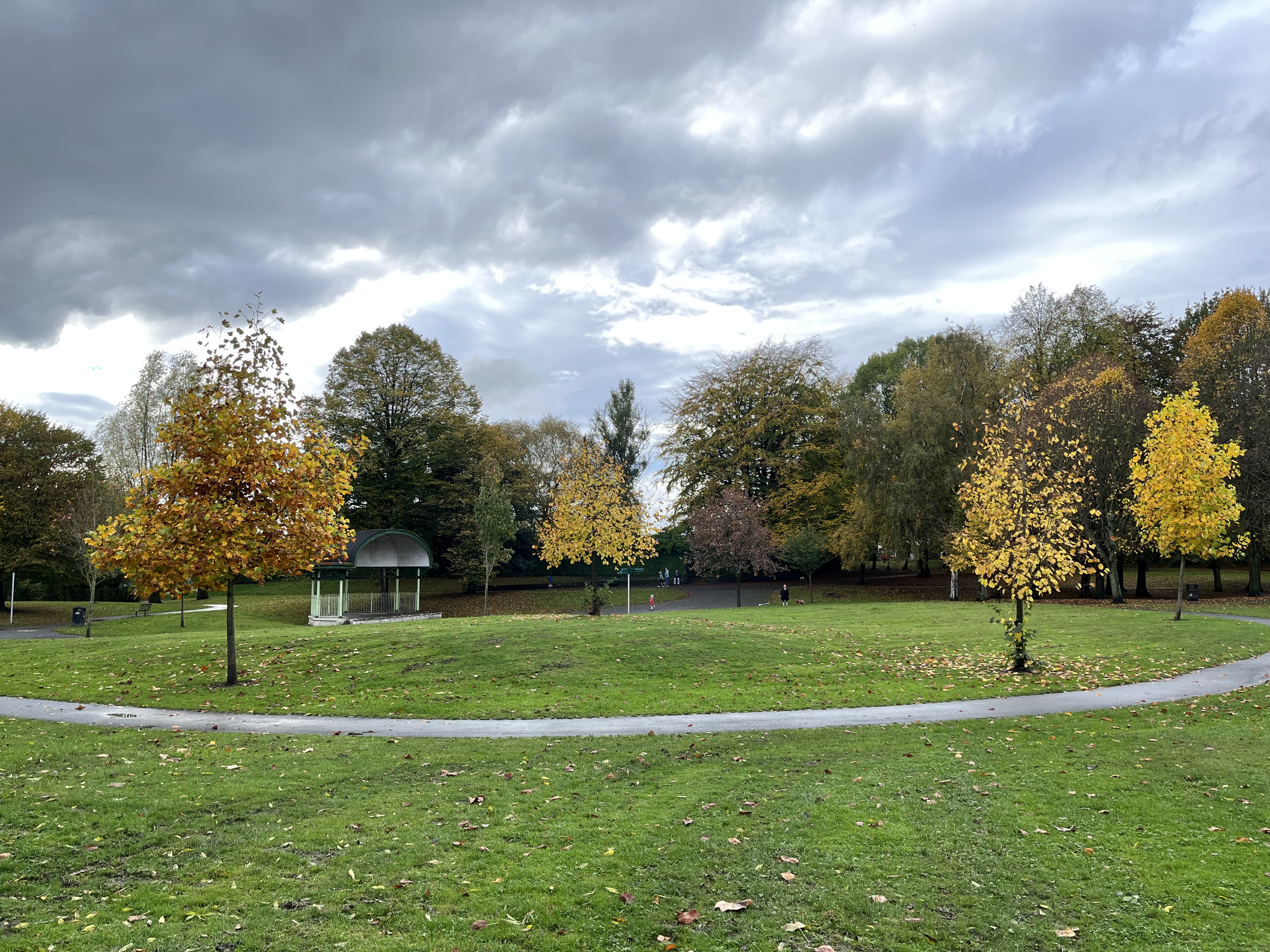
- Trees and the bandstand in the Victorian Parr Fold Park.

- Location within Greater Manchester
- Population: 35,616 (2014 estimate)
- OS grid reference: SD751030
  - London: 169 mi (272 km) SE
- Metropolitan borough: Salford
- Metropolitan county: Greater Manchester
- Region: North West
- Country: England
- Sovereign state: United Kingdom
- Post town: MANCHESTER
- Postcode district: M28
- Dialling code: 0161
- Police: Greater Manchester
- Fire: Greater Manchester
- Ambulance: North West
- UK Parliament: Bolton South and Walkden

Walkden is a town in the City of Salford in Greater Manchester, England, six miles (ten kilometres) northwest of central Salford, and seven miles (eleven kilometres) of Manchester.

Walkden has been designated as one of seven main town centres in the City of Salford, and now largely functions as a retail centre and commuter suburb of Greater Manchester.

Historically in the township of Worsley in Lancashire, Walkden was a centre for coal mining and textile manufacture.

In 2021, the electoral wards of Walkden North, Walkden South and Little Hulton had a combined population of 39,761.

== History ==
The name Walkden or Walkeden derives from the Old English denu, a valley, belonging to a man possibly called Wealca (fuller), an Old English personal name. It has been in existence since at least the 13th century. The name was recorded in documents dating to 1246.

A Roman road crossed the area roughly on the line of the present A6 road through Walkden and Little Hulton. In 1313, in a dispute involving land, a jury decided that Walkden was too small to be considered a hamlet or a town but was "only a place in Farnworth".

In the 15th century Walkden appears to have covered a wider area than at present, spreading into Farnworth and Little Hulton.

In 1765 "Walkden Moor" was the subject of a parliamentary inclosure act (5 Geo. 3. c. 60 Pr.). The Duke of Bridgewater was the biggest landowner in 1786, owning over half the land. At one time Walkden was dominated by coal mines and textile manufacturing.

=== Industrial heritage ===
Walkden's industrial history links are mainly to coal mining, but also to cotton mills. There were many shafts for small collieries sunk to the shallow coal seams of the Worsley Four Foot mine on land owned by the Egertons, the Lords of the Manor of Worsley which included Walkden.

Named shafts were, Speakman's, Edge Fold, Lloyd's and Hey's Field before 1770, Turnpike Lime, Barlow Fold, Scowcroft's, and Crippin's Croft before 1780, Pin Fold, Parr Fold and Tub Engine before 1790 and Grundy's Field, Stone, Windmill, Charlton's, and the Inclined Plane Pit all before 1800.

The Worsley Navigable Levels linked many of the mines to the Bridgewater Canal at Worsley. The levels were used to transport coal from the mines of the Bridgewater Collieries in Walkden until railways were used as an improved form of transportation.

After 1800 Urmston's Meadow, Moss Hill Top, Parkinson's and Sawney, Atkin's Croft, Barrack's, Magnall's, Ashton's Field and the Ellesmere were sunk but were independent of the levels. Walkden Yard or NCB Central Workshops was situated south of High Street, close to Ellesmere Colliery was partly in Little Hulton.

It was built 1878 by the Bridgewater Trustees as a central works depot providing engineering services for their collieries and colliery railways. On the site there was a Drafting Office, Machine and Fitting workshop, Pump Shop, Joiners Shop, Electricians shop, Paint Shop, Blacksmith and Tinsmith Shop, Welders Shop, Locomotive Overhaul and Repair Shop, Waggon sheds and Waggon machine shop and a Conveyor Belt Repair Shop. The yard closed as a British Coal workshop in 1986 and is now a housing estate.

== Governance ==
Following the 2023 Periodic Review of Westminster constituencies, the electoral wards of Little Hulton, Walkden North and Walkden South are now part of the newly-formed Bolton South and Walkden parliamentary constituency.

Walkden was part of the Worsley and Eccles South parliamentary constituency. Between 1983 and 2010 it was part of the Worsley parliamentary constituency. Between 1885 and 1983 Walkden lay in the now defunct Farnworth constituency and before that, from 1868 to 1885, within the South East Lancashire constituency.

Walkden was amalgamated into the City of Salford metropolitan district of Greater Manchester in April 1974, as part of the provisions of the Local Government Act 1972, having previously formed part of the Worsley Urban District in the administrative county of Lancashire. Walkden is divided into three electoral wards; Little Hulton, Walkden North and Walkden South. Walkden remains part of the Salford City Council administrative area.

Until 1894, Walkden lay within the township of Worsley in the ancient ecclesiastical parish of Eccles, within the Hundred of Salford in the historic county of Lancashire, although some parts including Linnyshaw and Toppings Bridge were within the parish of Deane. Worsley Urban District Council, which included Walkden, was formed in 1894.

=== UK Parliament Representative ===
Following the July 2024 General Election, the Bolton South and Walkden constituency is represented by Yasmin Qureshi MP in UK Parliament.

=== Salford City Council elected representatives ===
The council wards of Walkden North, Walkden South, and Little Hulton.

== Geography ==
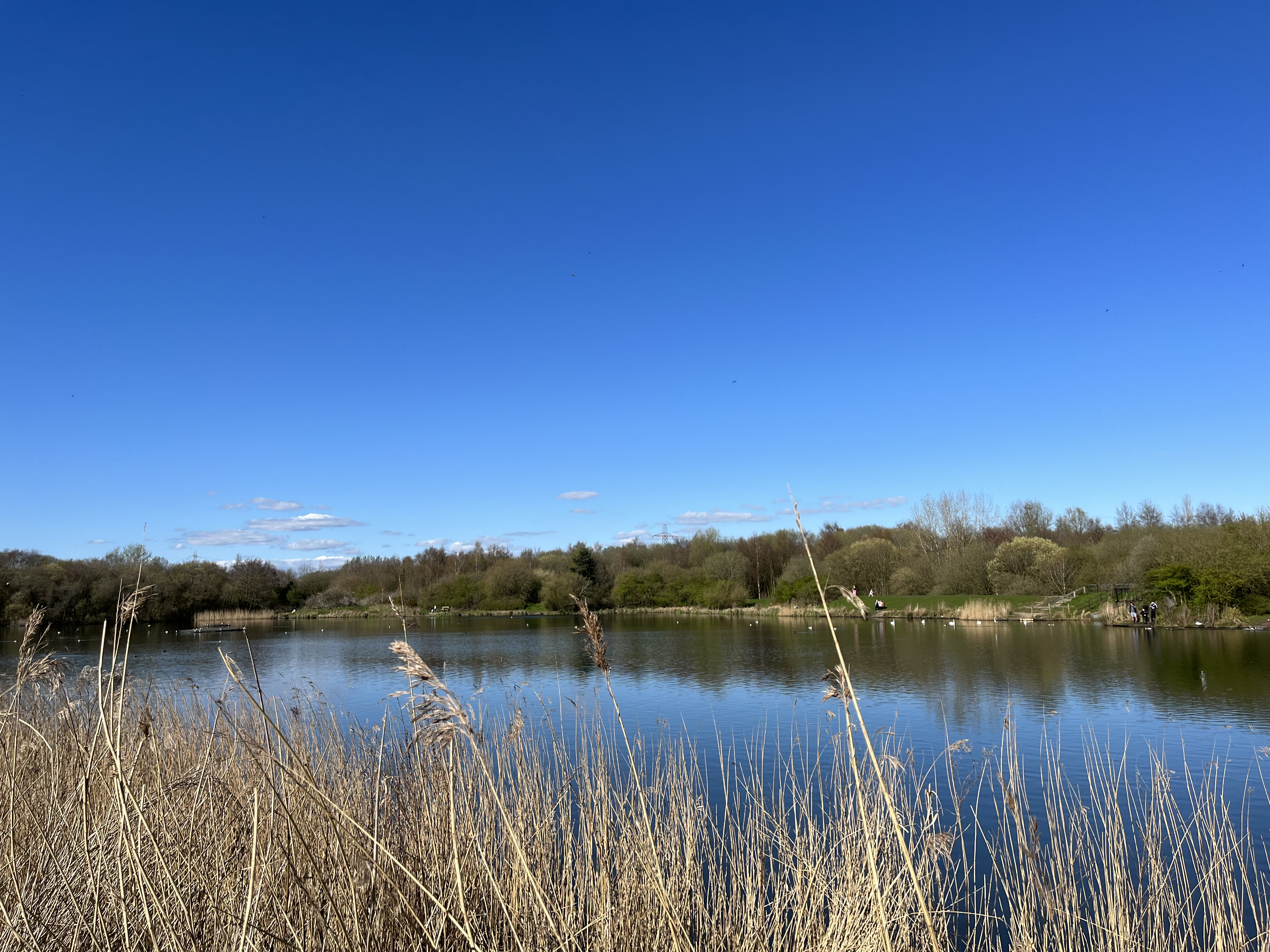
The reservoir at Blackleach Country Park, which holds a Green Flag Award

Walkden has two main parks in the town, namely Blackleach Country Park and Parr Fold Park. Parr Fold Park is a Victorian park.

Blackleach Country Park covers 50 hectares half-mile north of the town centre. The site is a designated local nature reserve. The reservoir was originally used by factories.

The formerly derelict and badly polluted site at Blackleach was next to a chemical waste tip, and was crossed by a disused railway line. It was reclaimed and restored after a community campaign.

A one tonne glacial erratic limestone boulder can be found in Parr Fold Park, indicated by an information sign. It is thought the provenance of the rock is linked to formations in the Lake District or South West Scotland, having been transported South to Walkden by melting ice 18,000 years ago.

Both of the parks have been recognised in the Green Flag Awards.

A small, gated angling pond can be found next to the Walkden Town Centre car park and can only be accessed by members. The site regularly holds fishing matches.

== Landmarks ==
=== Historical Monuments ===
The Ellesmere Monument in St Paul's Churchyard was erected in 1868 to commemorate Harriet (d. 1866), wife of the 1st Earl of Ellesmere. It was designed by T. G. Jackson, and inspired by the medieval Eleanor crosses.

It originally stood at the junction of the A6, A575 and B5232 roads but was moved into the churchyard in 1968 to reduce traffic congestion. Statues of four angels on the monument were stolen. A project to restore the monument was completed in 2006. It was later rebuilt.

Walkden Town Hall was demolished in 1999, to create extra car parking spaces for Walkden College.

Parr Fold Park has a cenotaph memorial, which is the site of Walkden's annual war Remembrance Day services. There is also a memorial garden to remember dead service men and women.

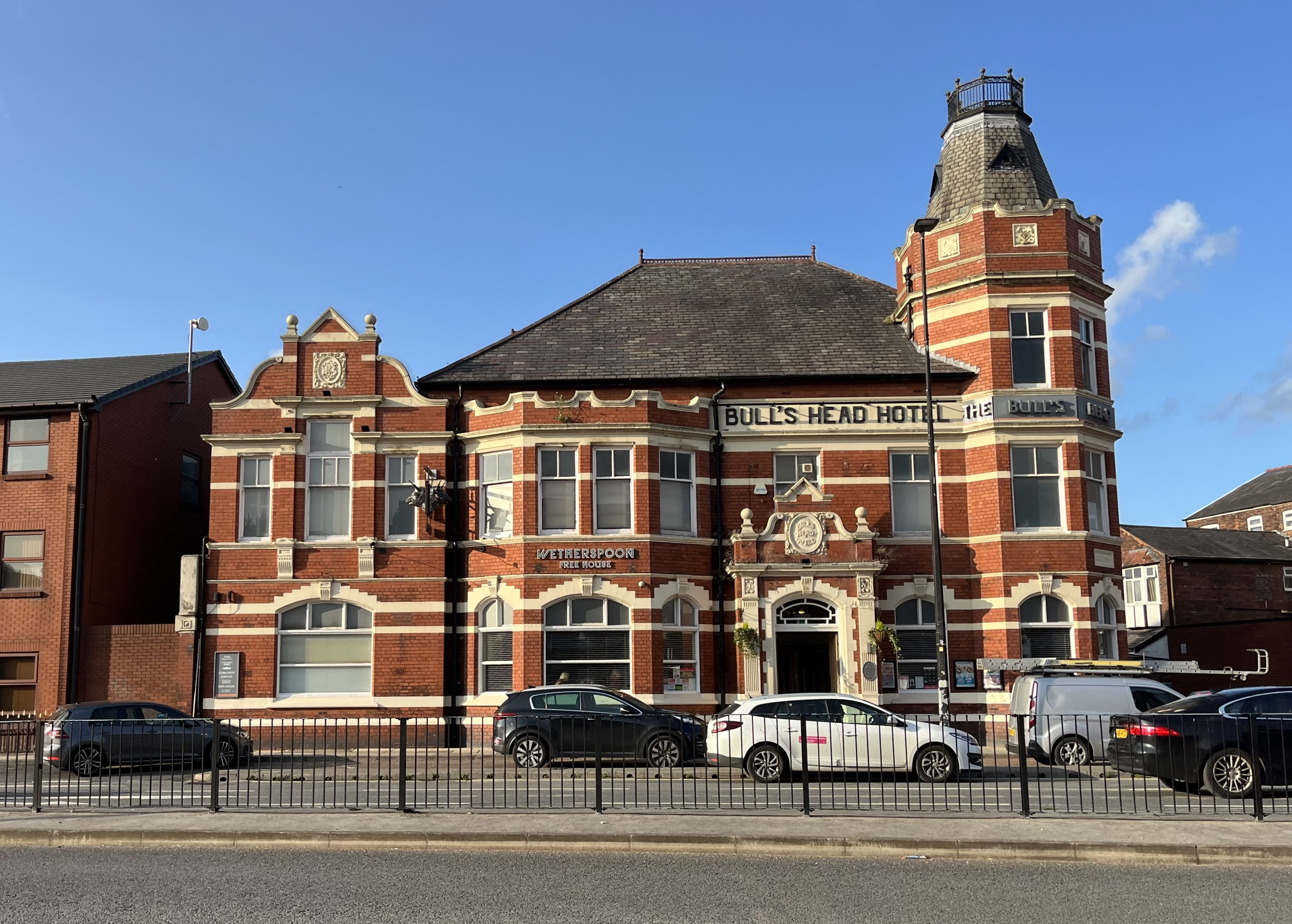
The Bull's Head Hotel on Manchester Road, Walkden

=== Ellesmere Centre ===
The Ellesmere Centre had a clock-tower which is a replica of the Lady Bourke Clock which once stood by the NCB Offices in Bridgewater Road. It was taken down when the Tesco store was erected. The original clock was used to alert coal miners to the beginning or end of their shifts.

The workers claimed that they could not hear the clock strike once at 1.00 pm to mark the end of dinnertime and the resumption of the working day, and it was altered to strike 13 times at 1.00 pm, a tradition continued by the replica clock.

=== Walkden Town Centre ===
The main shopping destination in Walkden has been rebranded as Walkden Town Centre (previously The Ellesmere Centre), housing 447,000 square feet (41,500 m^{2}) of floor space.

The centre became the location for one of the largest Tesco stores in the UK when it opened in 2010. The centre has 2,000 free car parking spaces and is visited by 150,000 shoppers every week. It was announced in 2022 that the bargain homeware retailer The Range would open a large 40,000 sq ft shop in the retail park, and this has been trading since November 2023.

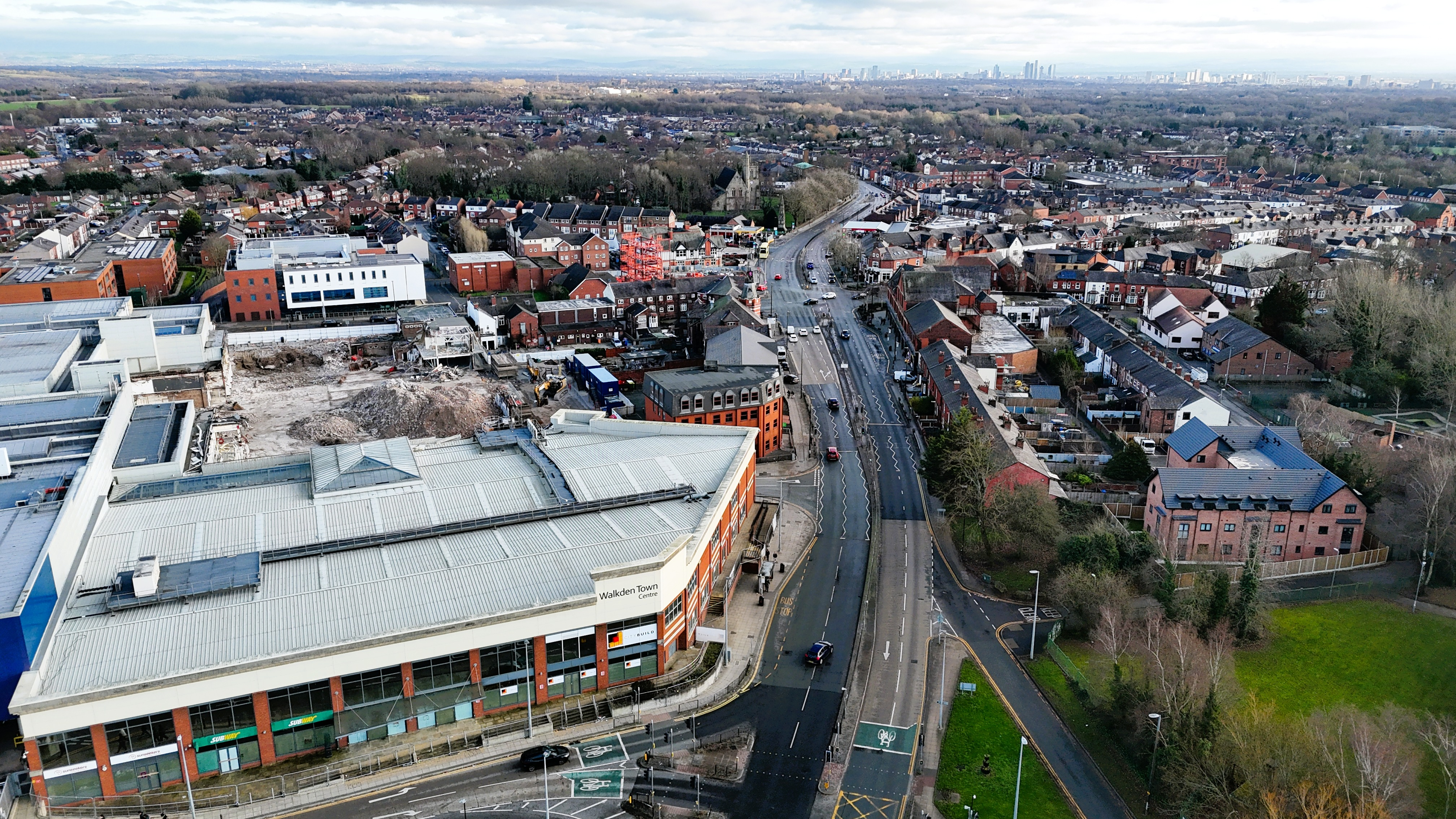
The ongoing refurbishment of Walkden Town Centre (December 2025).

Despite £70 million being spent on Walkden Town Centre regeneration, the centre has been subject to criticism for a leaking glass roof that covers the centre. An installation made up of plastic buckets hanging from the roof was placed by shopping centre managers Derwent Estates (the management company for The Derwent Group, which manages the assets of The Albert Gubay Charitable Foundation as a subsidiary company), to make light of the issue.

Plans were announced in 2017 for a 'Phase 5' development of Walkden Town Centre, which included provision for a new cinema and plans to increase footfall in the old side of the centre. However, these plans did not materialise.

Following local campaigning by residents, subsequent plans have since been released for Egerton Walk and Victoria Square sections of the centre by The Derwent Group in October 2023. These include provision for new retail units, green space, a pedestrianised boulevard and a new shopping centre atrium, with works totalling at least £15 million. These new features were due to be built by November 2025, following planned demolition works. Updated timescales suggest a completion date of November 2026, and works are now underway.

Plans for the redevelopment of the centre were officially granted consent by Salford City Council in June 2024.

== Transport ==
=== Bus services ===
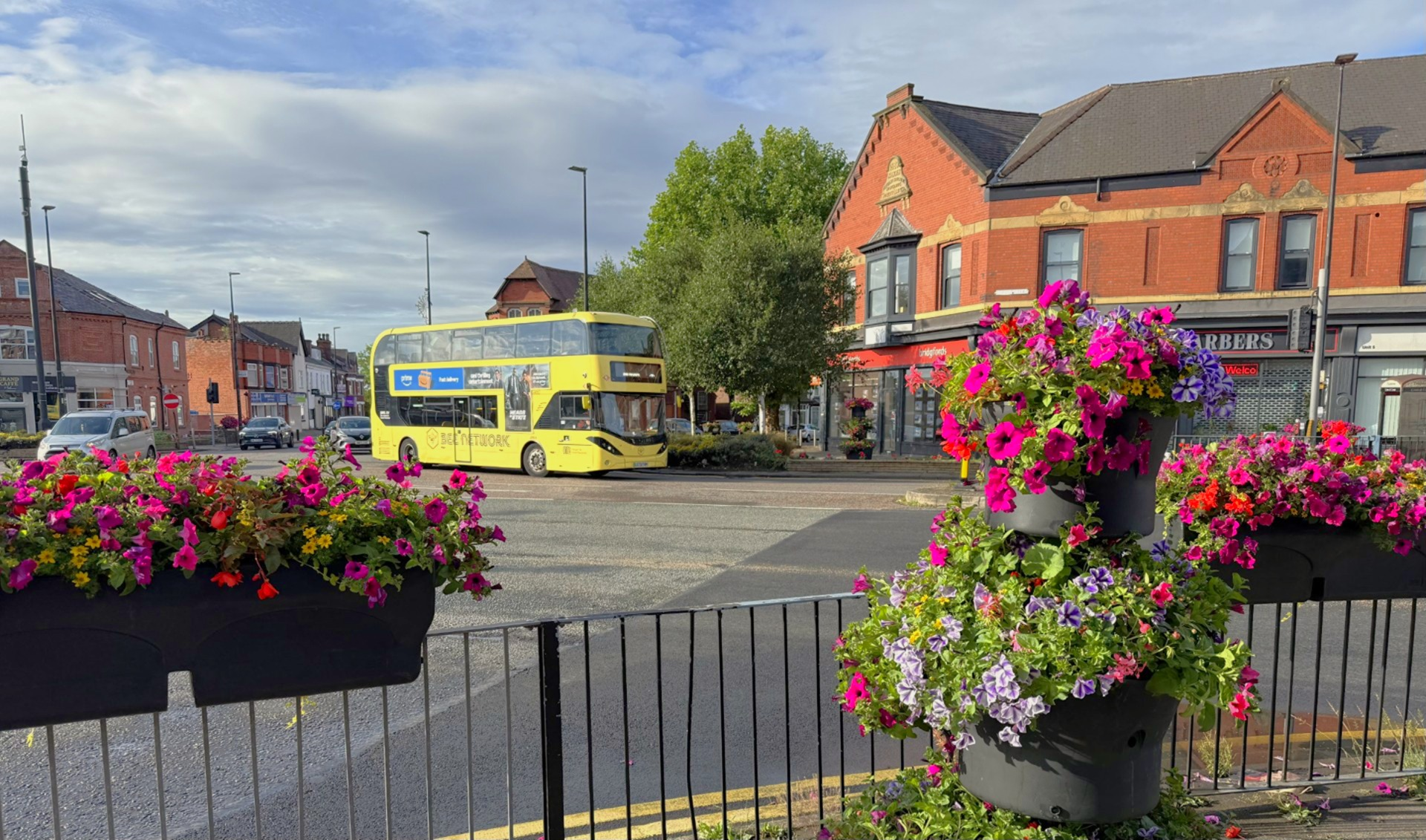
A Bee Network bus on Manchester Road, Walkden.

There are extensive and frequent bus services in Walkden, linking the town with Manchester, Bolton and Leigh. These also call at Farnworth, Little Hulton and Swinton. Buses also take passengers from Walkden to the Trafford Centre via Monton, and the Media City.

=== Train Services ===
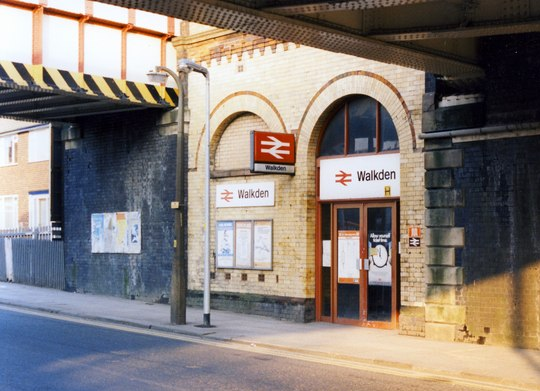
The exterior of Walkden railway station

Walkden once had two railway stations. In 1875, the London and North Western Railway opened a station on the Bolton-to-Eccles line known as Walkden Low Level. It was closed in 1954.

The Lancashire and Yorkshire Railway provided a station on the Manchester-to-Wigan line in 1888. Walkden railway station, originally known as "Walkden High Level railway station", remains open. Both lines were built as a result of the coal mining in the area.

According to 2006 figures, Walkden station (operated by Northern Rail) was used by over 150,000 passengers annually.

Passenger numbers for Walkden peaked during 2019–2020 with 374,288 estimated passengers. Usage dropped to 19% during the 2020–2021 travel lockdowns and recovered to 65% by 2023.

Monday to Saturday daytimes, two trains per hour go eastbound to Manchester Victoria and two per hour towards Wigan – both trains continue to Wigan Wallgate westbound and one continues to Kirkby (down from three each way prior to the pandemic).

Only one train per day (weekdays and Saturdays) continues to Southport since the summer 2019 timetable change. All Sunday services continue to Southport. Most Manchester departures continue along the Caldervale Line to Todmorden, Burnley Manchester Road and Blackburn or to Leeds via Brighouse.

On 11 March 2020, The Chancellor of The Exchequer announced that Walkden Station would be one of 12 stations to receive Access for All funding from Network Rail, in order to develop step-free access to the station. The project experienced temporary setbacks in 2024, caused by old mine workings found beneath the station.

In April 2023, a park and ride facility for 107 cars was opened by Salford City Council. The site also includes a bike storage shed for 32 bikes, electric charging stations for electric vehicles and motorcycle bays.

Currently, the Manchester–Southport line passing through Walkden is not electrified, meaning trains use diesel as fuel.

=== Active Travel ===
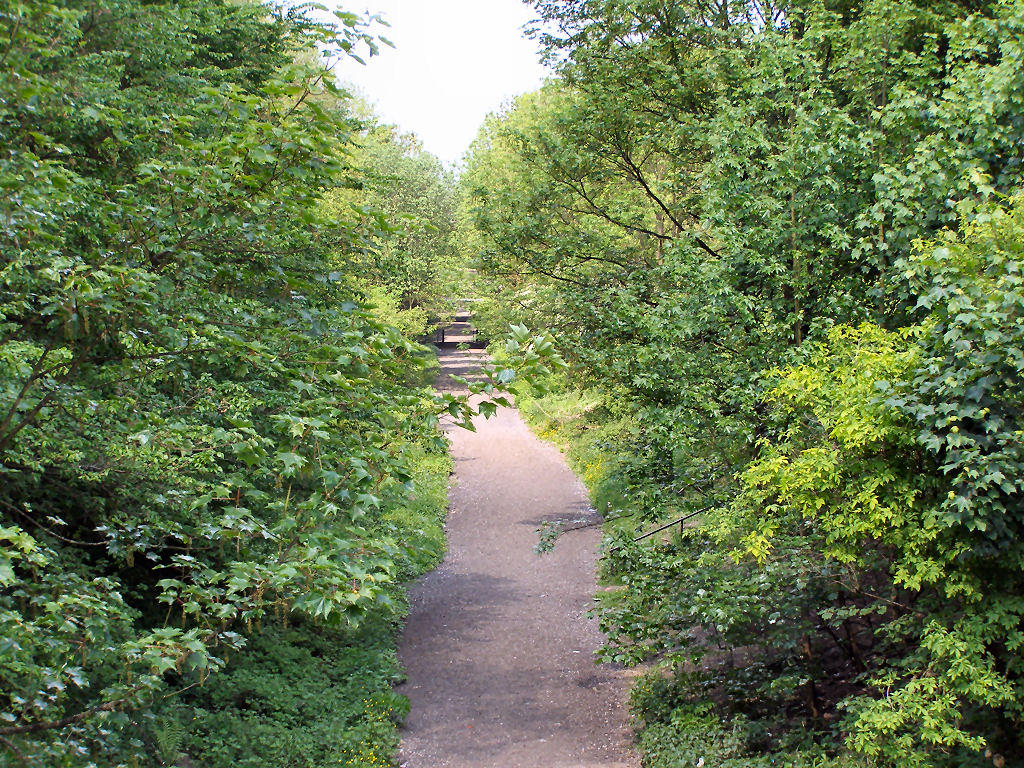
The Roe Green Loopline walking and cycle track near Walkden Road. The path overlays the site of a former railway track bed.

The Roe Green Loopline passes through Walkden and is a 7.2 km (4.5 miles) traffic-free, off-road walking and cycling route that starts in Monton and runs all the way to the Salford-Bolton border. Works to the final two stretches of the route between Tynesbank and Mesne Lea School and between Anchor Lane and Mount Skip Lane were completed in summer 2016.

=== Roads ===
Walkden is at the junction of A6 and the Bolton to Worsley A575. The East Lancashire Road (A580) passes to the south and connects to the M60 ring-road and the motorway network.

=== Metrolink tram proposals ===
Walkden has been named as a possible beneficiary of TfGM's Bee Network Metrolink extension works. One proposed option is constructing a spur from Bolton, if the Metrolink Bolton extension were to be funded. It has also been suggested that tram-trains could run from Manchester Victoria to Wigan on the Manchester-Southport Line, leaving the conventional rail tracks and onto tramways from Atherton. This would enable Metrolink trams to stop at Walkden railway Station. An additional proposal is using the Roe Green Loopline, to run the Metrolink from its current terminus in Eccles towards Little Hulton, stopping in Walkden.

== Education ==
Walkden has several primary schools, two high schools and a sixth form college which include Co-op Academy Walkden and The Lowry Academy. Until 2014 Walkden had three high schools, before the closure of St. George's RC High School in July 2014.

An Ofsted inspection at Co-op Walkden Academy in July 2023 found that the school was rated as 'Good' in all areas.

In February 2024, an Ofsted inspection at The Lowry Academy also resulted in a 'Good' rating, noting that the school had undergone a “positive transformation”.

A number of the town's primary schools are church schools. They include: St Paul's, Crompton Street, and St Paul's, Heathside, which are both Church of England schools. Christ the King RC Primary School is the Roman Catholic primary school for Walkden, Worsley and Roe Green.

In addition there are three county primary schools - they are North Walkden Primary School in the north of the town and Mesne Lea Primary School and James Brindley Primary School in south Walkden.

Worsley College, a post-16 vocational college which was previously known as Salford College, has a campus located in Walkden on Walkden Road, close to the railway station. The site underwent a significant renovation in 2023/24, adding a brand new café facility.

== Religious buildings ==
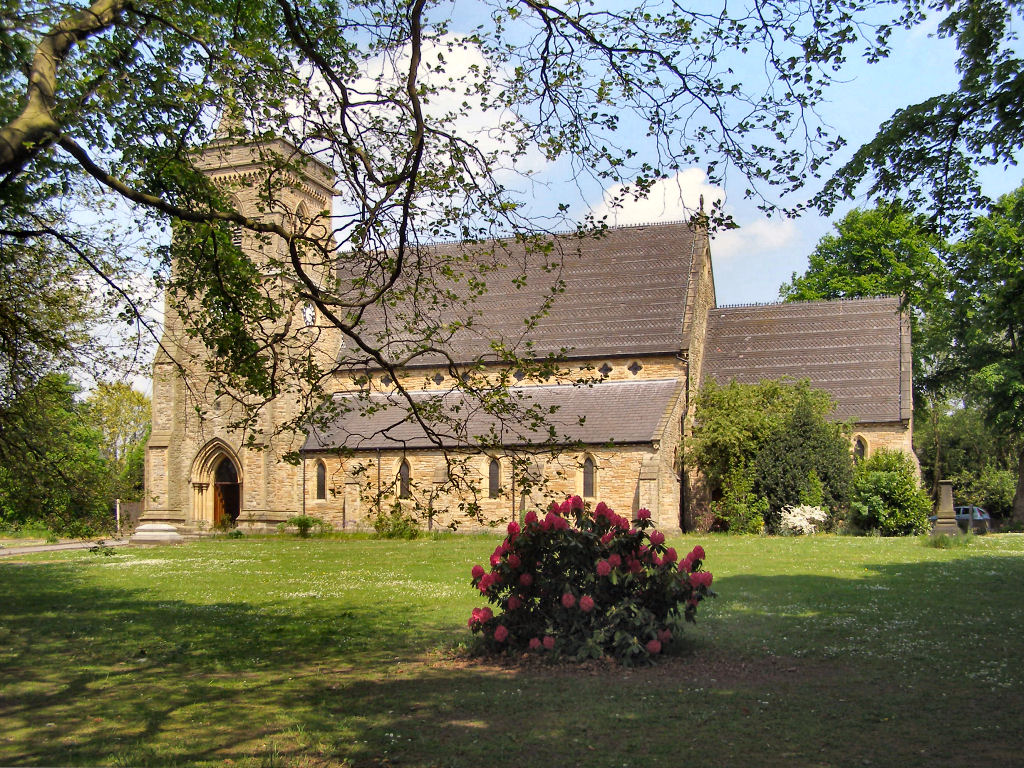
St Paul's Church, Walkden

St Paul's Church was founded in 1838 in the church school and was originally known as St George's Chapel. The foundation stone for St. Paul's at Walkden Moor was laid in 1847 by Lady Brackley, daughter of the Earl of Ellesmere. The church cost £4,500 and was dedicated in 1848 by the Bishop of Manchester.

The church was extended in 1881 by the addition of the north aisle, built at a cost of £1,000 which was raised by the parishioners. The east windows date from 1884 and mosaic panels are from 1904.

St John's Church was founded in 1876 in Walkden although most of its parish is in Little Hulton, it is part of the Walkden & Little Hulton Team Ministry.

There are two Methodist churches, Walkden Methodist Church and Worsley Road North Methodist Church. Christ the King Roman Catholic Church serves the Roman Catholic communities of Walkden, Roe Green and Worsley. There is also a Congregational church.

== Community ==
Salford City Council operate a large community hub, health centre and library in Walkden called Walkden Gateway.

There are several community groups based in the town, including:

- Friends of Parr Fold Park
- Walkden in Bloom
- Friends of Walkden Station
- Walkden Community

Walkden has multiple sports teams and sports facilities the town, including:

- Walkden Cricket Club
- Walkden Jolly Joggers
- North Walkden FC
- Worsley Leisure Centre
- Walkden ABC - MaverickStars (youth boxing)
- Gorilla Warfare (Martial Arts)
- Total Fitness
- The Den (youth centre)

== In popular culture ==
Walkden featured in the news in 1994, when well-known British television host Richard Madeley was arrested for failing to pay for items, including champagne, on two occasions at the Tesco supermarket in Walkden.

Then British Prime Minister Theresa May visited Walkden during the 2017 Conservative Party Conference to meet a couple who had just bought a new build house using the government's Help to Buy Scheme.

== Notable people ==
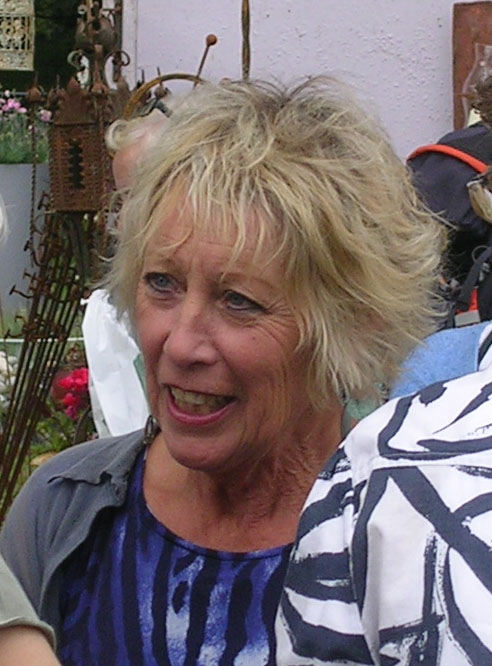
Carol Klein, 2010

- Guy Rowson (1883–1937), politician, MP for Farnworth 1929 to 1931 & 1935 to 1937.
- Lawrence Cunliffe (born 1929), politician, MP for Leigh from 1979 to 2001.
- Carol Klein (born 1945), a gardener and presenter of TV show Gardener's World
- David Bamber (born 1954), actor, 1995 winner of Laurence Olivier Award for Best Actor for My Night with Reg
- Christopher Eccleston (born 1964), actor, ninth Doctor Who, grew up in Little Hulton
- Jason Done (born 1973), actor, played Tom Clarkson in Waterloo Road
- Andy Whyment (born 1981), actor, played Kirk Sutherland in Coronation Street
- Sarah Whatmore (born 1981), singer, appeared in the first series of the TV series Pop Idol.
- Alan Halsall (born 1982), actor, played Tyrone Dobbs in Coronation Street
- Catherine Tyldesley (born 1983), actress, played Eva Price in Coronation Street
- Sacha Parkinson (born 1992), actress, played Sian Powers in Coronation Street

=== Sport ===
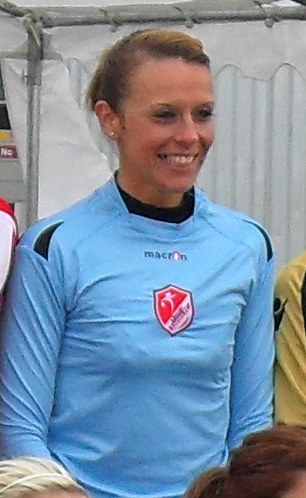
Kay Hawke, 2010

- Bob Smith, (1901-??), footballer, played 176 games including 139 for Torquay United
- John Hallows (1907–1963), footballer who played 164 games for Bradford City, and then became a tailor before dying locally.
- Ernie Machin (1944–2012), footballer who played 378 games including 257 at Coventry City
- John Wilkinson (born 1964), former chairman of Salford RLFC
- Jamie Moore (born 1978), the Commonwealth super welterweight champion twice between 2003 and 2007
- Kay Hawke (born 1983), football goalkeeper, who most recently played for Lincoln Ladies
- Andrew Rushton (born 1983), table tennis player, mens doubles silver medallist, 2006 Commonwealth Games
- Adam Eckersley (born 1985), footballer who played 277 games
- John McAtee (born 1999), footballer who has played over 230 games, currently with Bolton Wanderers.

== See also ==
- Listed buildings in Worsley
