= A572 road =

Road in England

Coordinates: 53.49301°N 2.52085°W

A572

Route information
- Length: 18.9 mi (30.4 km)

Major junctions
- East end: Swinton, Greater Manchester
- A6 A580 M60 A575 A5082 A574 A578 A579 A573; A49; A58
- West end: St Helens, Merseyside

Location
- Country: United Kingdom
- Constituent country: England
- Primary destinations: Leigh

Road network
- Roads in the United Kingdom; Motorways; A and B road zones

The A572 is a main road serving the Greater Manchester and Merseyside areas, running from Swinton to St Helens via Leigh and Newton-le-Willows.

== Route ==
The A572 starts in Swinton at a dog-legged T-junction with the A6. The road heads in a south-westerly direction, crossing the A580 at traffic lights. The road heads in a westerly curve into Worsley, apart from a sharp corner at the junction with Hazelhurst Road. For a brief time, the road leaves the urban environment and heads along the wooded edge of Worsley Golf Course, before heading into Worsley Village.

At Worsley the road meets with the M60 motorway at junction 13, where the A575 and B5211 also terminate. The road gains primary status for the short section between two roundabouts on either side of the motorway. The A572 heads under the M60 then makes a shallow climb through Worsley Woods towards Boothstown where the speed limit is increased to 40 mph (64 km/h). At the edge of Boothstown, the limit drops to 30 mph (48 km/h). Having passed through the centre of Boothstown, the road TOTSO's at the junction with the A577 where there is short climb. Next is the Queens roundabout, a rather angular roundabout, where the A580 East Lancashire Road dissects the village.

After crossing the East Lancashire Road, the A572 continues to head west into the Wigan Borough. Signs show Tyldesley and then into the former mining village of Astley. The road heads through an industrial area before entering the village. There are numerous junctions, the first at Cross Hillock, which has two unclassified roads coming off it, both with right turn bans imposed. Next is a roundabout junction with the A5082 the official route to the A577 at Tyldesley. Prince's Avenue, which leads off at the next junction, a mini-roundabout in the centre of the Blackmoor.

From there, the road takes a windy course heading out of the village, past a high school. The speed limit remains at 30 mph (48 km/h). The road then enters Leigh passing the cemetery and high school, before making a tight left turn at a double mini-roundabout. The road continues and curves round to the next set of traffic lights at the junction with the A574 at Butts Bridge and continues past a police station to the town centre bypass. After about 1/4 mi (0.40 km) the bypass ends, and the road TOTSO's at the bus station traffic lights.

Here the road heads south to Lowton, crossing the A579 alongside Pennington Flash Country Park, and passing another high school before reaching Lane Head junction in the middle of Lowton, where it crosses the A580 for the third and final time. Here the A572 gains primary status for 1/2 mi (0.80 km) (part of the A579 multiplex), and in this short section has junctions at three sets of traffic lights, the A580, the B5207 Golborne to Culcheth road, and the A579 T-junction. The road reverts to A road status as it winds towards Newton-le-Willows, with the speed limit increasing to 40 mph (64 km/h) as it heads into open countryside.

There is a staggered crossroads with the A573 where it crosses out of the Wigan Borough and into St Helens. The West Coast Main Line crosses underneath just before the junction, and the M6 motorway passes overhead just afterwards. The road reverts to 30 mph (48 km/h) as the area becomes built-up. In Newton-le-Willows, it meets the A49 outside Newton Station.

There is a short multiplex about 1 mile (1.6 km) long, using the A49 north through the shopping area. At a mini-roundabout, the designation returns to the A572, still heading westerly in a straight line past Earlestown. The road curves south westerly into a rural section where the speed limit becomes 40 mph (64 km/h), and passes the Warrington / St Helens boundary, before curving north westerly into St Helens (back to 30 mph (48 km/h) after approximately 2 miles (3.2 km)). The road meets an oversized roundabout, where local roads head off to the south. The road winds through Parr, where it meets with 3 or 4 sets of traffic lights at local roads. It then meets with the A58 at a large T-junction set of traffic lights, where it terminates.
