= Peel Green =

Suburb of Eccles, Greater Manchester, England

Coordinates: 53.4733°N 2.3842°W

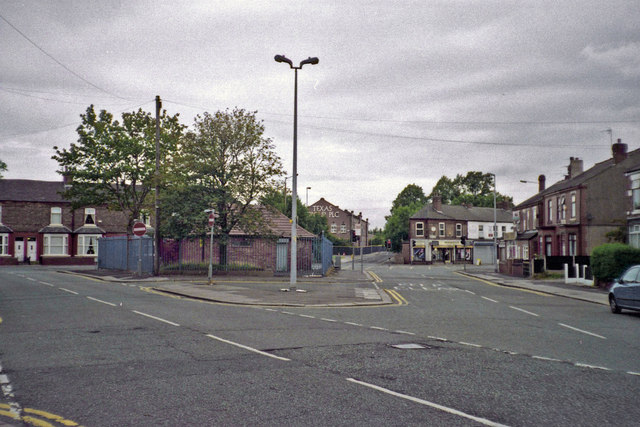

- Location within Greater Manchester
- OS grid reference: SJ7497
- Metropolitan borough: City of Salford
- Metropolitan county: Greater Manchester
- Region: North West
- Country: England
- Sovereign state: United Kingdom
- Post town: Manchester
- Postcode district: M30
- Dialling code: 0161
- Police: Greater Manchester
- Fire: Greater Manchester
- Ambulance: North West

Peel Green is a suburb at the western end of Eccles, Greater Manchester, England, in the historic county of Lancashire.

== Transport ==
Peel Green is split by the M60 motorway, which runs north–south through its centre. It is served by the following bus services: Cadishead/Manchester 67, Warrington/Trafford Centre/Manchester 100, Brookhouse/Manchester 10 and Brookhouse/Piccadilly 63.

== Economy ==
Until the 1980s Peel Green was dominated by heavy industry, with engine builder L Gardner & Sons on Hardy Street and the Regent Tyre and Rubber Co, (a subsidiary of Dunlop Tyres) at the Enterprise Works on the corner of Green Street and Clifford Street. These are now closed. With the loss of its industrial base, Peel Green is seeking new types of investment to aid in the renewal of the area.

During 2003, the Brookhouse Estate saw curfews imposed on under 16s, a substantial police presence and a security camera erected outside the local shops in Brookhouse Avenue in an effort to tackle the crime rate. Salford City Academy, formerly Canon Williamson Church of England High School (and before this Eccles C.E High School), is on the Brookhouse Estate. After substantial redevelopment, the school opened as an academy in September 2006. The school's specialisms are sport and business and enterprise. A separate sixth form centre opened in September 2007 at a cost of £1.8 million. Other schools in the area include St Patrick's Roman Catholic High School.

== Housing ==
Along with Westwood Park in Winton, the Peel Green area houses much of Eccles' council and housing association stock. The medium-sized Brookhouse Estate is at the western end of Peel Green and many other council homes are located in the Haddon Road and Higher Croft areas in the centre of Peel Green.

== Recreation and sport ==
Recreation Grounds (known officially as Patricroft Recreation Ground, but not in Patricroft) and large playing fields alongside Worsley Brook between Schofield Road and the M60 motorway. Peel Green has been home to Eccles Rugby Union Club since 1948 and Barton Hall Cricket Club formerly played in here. Peel Green has been the home of Eccles Archery Club since it was founded in 1953.
