= A577 road =

Road in England

A577

Route information
- Length: 23.5 mi (37.8 km)

Major junctions
- From: Boothstown
- A49; M6; A58 A570 A572 A578 A579 A5082
- To: Ormskirk

Location
- Country: United Kingdom
- Primary destinations: Leigh, Wigan, Skelmersdale, Ormskirk, Manchester

Road network
- Roads in the United Kingdom; Motorways; A and B road zones

The A577 is an A road in England which runs from Boothstown, Greater Manchester to Ormskirk, Lancashire.

== Route ==
The A577 starts at A572 in Boothstown, where it climbs uphill and over the A580 and into Tyldesley. It meets the A5082, then climbs up to Atherton. The road then meets A579, passes through the north of Westleigh and passes the A578 at a T-junction. The road heads into Hindley, crossing the A58 and goes into Wigan. It then goes through Pemberton, past the M6 and the M58 junctions at Orrell. It enters Up Holland. After going past an urbanized area, it ascends slightly and goes into Westhead. It passes Ormskirk High School, then enters Ormskirk. The road ends at a junction with the A570.
