= Salford City Academy =

Location
- Northfleet Road; Eccles, Greater Manchester, M30 7PQ; England; 53.478611°N 2.381111°W

Information
- Type: Academy
- Motto: The best in everyone
- Religious affiliation: Church of England (de facto)
- Established: 2006
- Local authority: Salford City Council
- Department for Education URN: 135071 Tables
- Ofsted: Reports
- Principal: Melanie Haselden
- Gender: Mixed
- Age: 11 to 16
- Enrolment: 820 pupils
- Website: http://www.salfordcity-academy.org.uk

Salford City Academy (formerly Canon Williamson C.E. High School, and before that Eccles C.E. High School) is a state comprehensive high school and academy situated in the Peel Green area of Eccles, in Salford, Greater Manchester, England. Salford City Academy opened in 2006 after substantial redevelopment. The school is sponsored by United Learning, the largest multi academy trust in the UK. The academy was shortlisted for Secondary School of the Year for the National TES Awards in 2021, the principal Ms Melanie Haselden was also shortlisted for Headteacher of the Year in the same awards.

In February 2021, due to the demand for student places at Salford City Academy the academy was given planning permission to extend the dining space to double in size and refurbish several learning spaces such as Drama, Music and Technology to make the areas more practical. Building work began in July 2021 and will continue through to May 2022.

This sixth form is now no longer used as a sixth form, but is now known as ‘The Irwell Building’ where classes, reflect (internal exclusion), and extra space is accessible.

== Standards ==
In 2015 the school was judged to be "good" by Ofsted
