= A575 road =

Road in Greater Manchester, England

A575

Route information
- Length: 3.2 mi (5.1 km)
- History: Used to start from Stretford.

Major junctions
- From: Worsley
- A580 M60 A5082 A666
- To: Farnworth

Location
- Country: United Kingdom
- Primary destinations: Farnworth, Walkden, Worsley

Road network
- Roads in the United Kingdom; Motorways; A and B road zones

The A575 is an A road in Greater Manchester which connects Worsley and Farnworth.

== Route ==
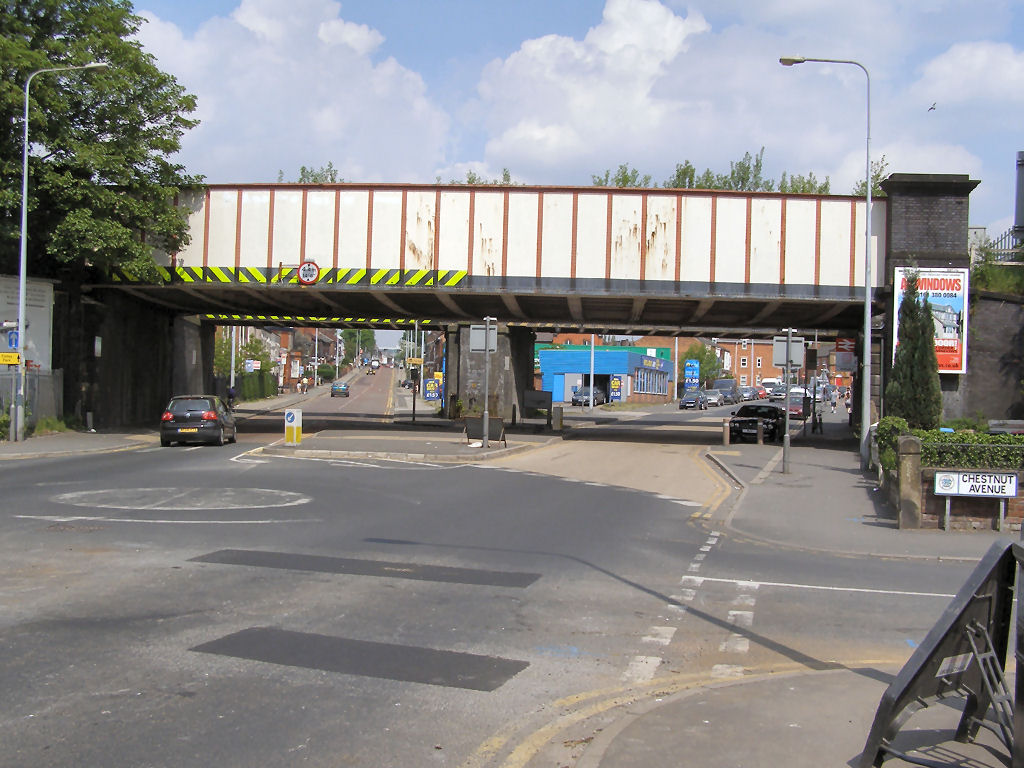
The A575 goes underneath a railway bridge.

The road begins in Worsley village at junction 13 of the M60 at the A572, where this road goes beneath the M60. It crosses the East Lancashire Road – A580, after which it loses primary status. It then goes through Walkden past the railway station and crosses the A6. It heads over the M61 before meeting with the A5082. The road then comes to its end at Moses Gate near the A666.

It has a 30 mph speed limit for its full length.

=== Previous route ===
The A575 previously continued from Worsley through Trafford Park, and terminated at the A56 in Stretford. This section is now the B5211 road from Worsley to Trafford Park and the A5181 (Park Road) from thereon.
