= St Patrick's Roman Catholic High School =

St Patrick's RC High School

Location
- Guilford Road; Peel Green, Eccles; Salford, Greater Manchester, M30 7JF; England; 53.48316°N 2.367°W

Information
- Type: Voluntary aided school
- Religious affiliation: Roman Catholic
- Established: 1957
- Local authority: Salford City Council
- Department for Education URN: 105986 Tables
- Ofsted: Reports
- Headteacher: Alison Byrne
- Gender: Coeducational
- Age: 11 to 16
- Enrolment: 930 as of January 2023
- Website: http://www.stpatricksrchigh.co.uk/

St Patrick's RC High School is a coeducational Roman Catholic secondary school in the Peel Green area of Eccles, Greater Manchester, England.

Established in 1957, St. Patrick's was re-organised as a comprehensive school in 1977. It is a voluntary aided school administered by Salford City Council and the Roman Catholic Diocese of Salford. The school moved into a new building in 2013 as part of the Building Schools for the Future programme.

St Patrick's RC High School offers GCSEs and BTECs as programmes of study for pupils. The school is named after Saint Patrick, a 5th-century Christian missionary and the first Bishop of Armagh in Ireland.

== Notable former pupils ==
- Josie Rourke, theatre and film director
- Michelle Keegan, actress
- Samia Ghadie, actress
- Rob James-Collier, actor
- Isabel Hodgins, actress
