= A666 road =

Road in England

A666

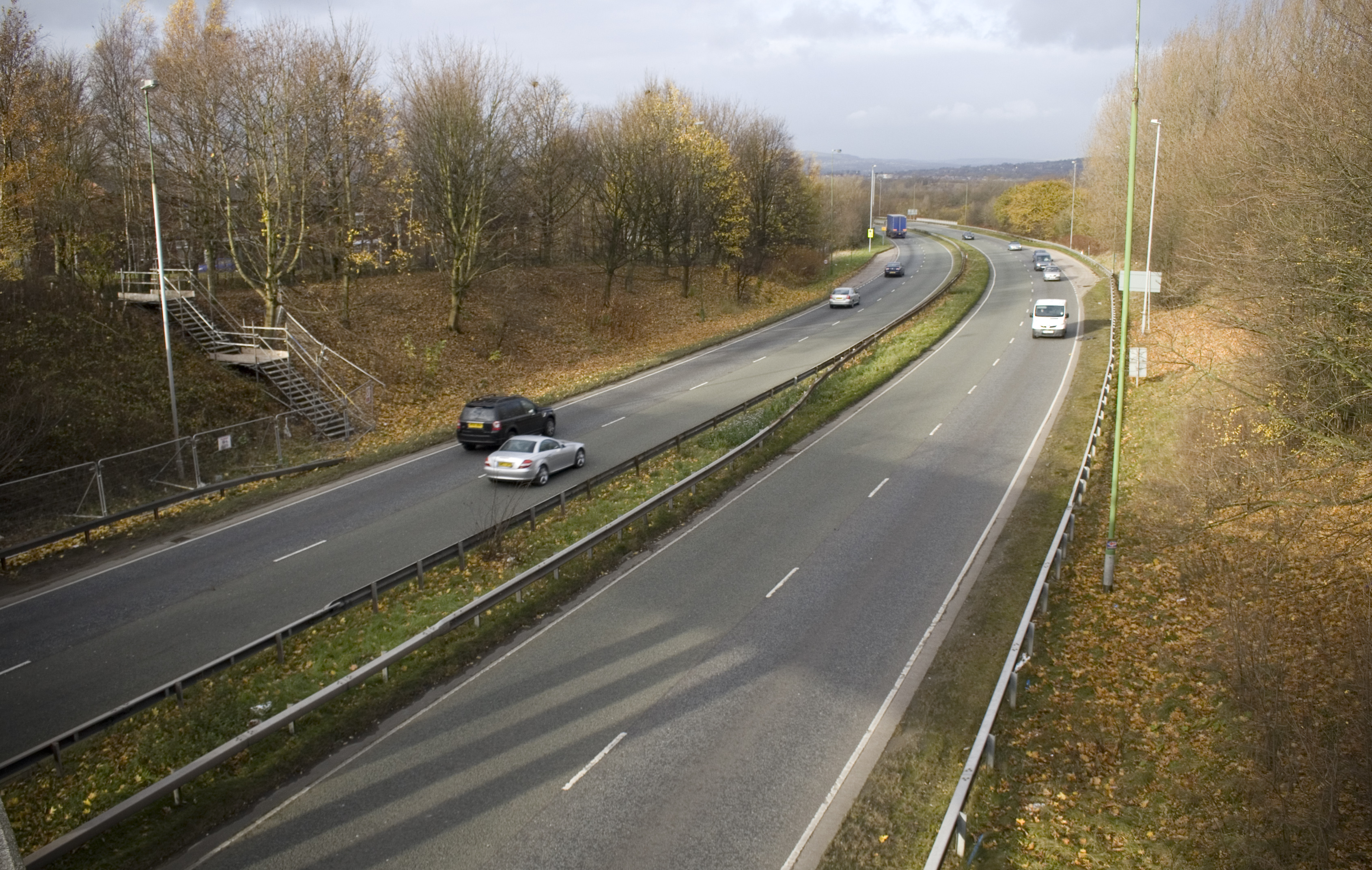
- A666 near Farnworth

Major junctions
- South end: Pendlebury; 53.5025°N 2.3103°W
- A6 / A580; A6044; M60; A667; M61 / A6053; A575; A579; A676; A673; A6099; A58 / A675; M65; A6062; A6078; A6119; A59
- North end: Langho; 53.8086°N 2.4448°W

Location
- Country: United Kingdom
- Primary destinations: Bolton; Blackburn

Road network
- Roads in the United Kingdom; Motorways; A and B road zones

The A666 is a major road in Greater Manchester and Lancashire, England.

== Route ==
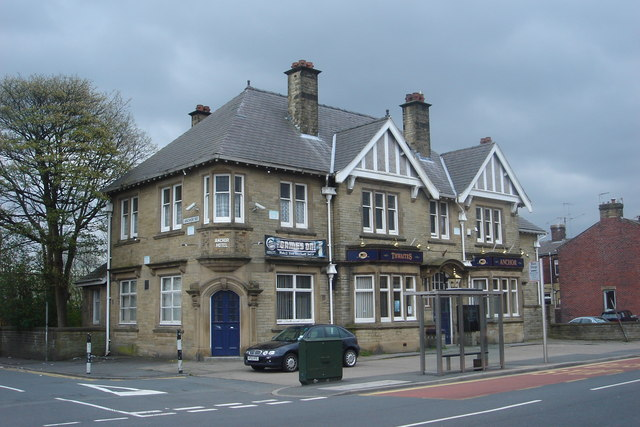
Anchor Hotel on the A666 Blackburn Road in Darwen

The road runs from its junction with the A6, and A580 at the Irlams o' th' Height boundary with Pendlebury near Manchester, through Pendlebury, Clifton, Kearsley, Farnworth, Bolton, Darwen and Blackburn before meeting the A59 at Langho. Along the route are the West Pennine Moors, the Turton and Entwistle reservoir and the Entwistle reservoir forest.

== Road names ==
=== Most common names ===
The road is mostly known as Manchester Road, Bolton Road, or Blackburn Road, depending on which area it is in.

=== Devil's Highway ===
It is sometimes referred to as the Devil's Highway or the Devil's Road because of Biblical associations of its number 666, and its high accident rate on the moors between Egerton and Darwen.

== Crash rate ==
Because of a crash rate that was three times higher than motorways in the borough, with 26 vehicle collisions and crashes a year and 40 people injured, road works and other changes were introduced, including the speed limit changed from 70 mph to 50 mph, speed cameras, better safety fencing, banning cyclists from the road, and slip road changes. Finished at the start of 2000, these reduced road accidents by 60%.

== See also ==
- List of highways numbered 666
