= Boothstown =

Village in Greater Manchester, England

Coordinates: 53.5024°N 2.4252°W

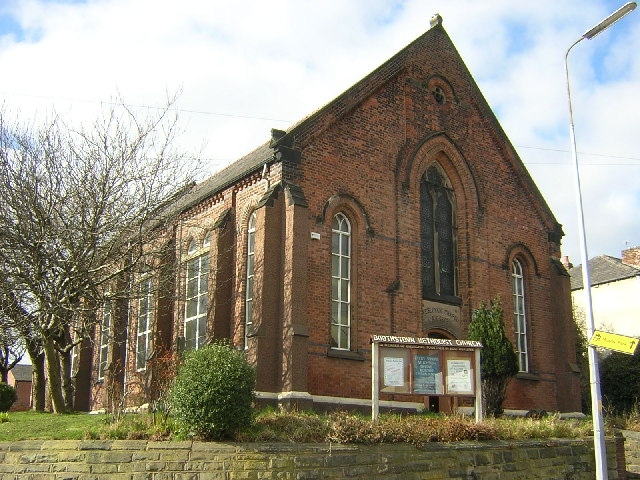
- Methodist Chapel, Boothstown

- Location within Greater Manchester
- Population: 9,599 (2011.Ward. Boothstown and Ellenbrook)
- OS grid reference: SD7200
- Metropolitan borough: Salford
- Metropolitan county: Greater Manchester
- Region: North West
- Country: England
- Sovereign state: United Kingdom
- Post town: MANCHESTER
- Postcode district: M28
- Dialling code: 0161
- Police: Greater Manchester
- Fire: Greater Manchester
- Ambulance: North West
- UK Parliament: Worsley and Eccles South

Boothstown is a suburban village in the City of Salford in Greater Manchester, England. Boothstown forms part of the Boothstown and Ellenbrook ward, which had a population at the 2011 Census of 9,599. The village is within the boundaries of the historic county of Lancashire, west of the City of Salford, bordered to the north by the East Lancashire Road A580 and to the south by the Bridgewater Canal. Historically, it was a hamlet partly in Worsley township in the parish of Eccles, and partly in Tyldesley in the parish of Leigh.

Boothstown lies 5.2 miles (8.4 km) northwest of Salford, 6.8 miles (10.9 km) northwest of Manchester and 10 miles (16.1 km) southeast of Wigan. Astley is to the west, to the north is Walkden and to the east is Worsley where there is a transport interchange between the M60, M62 and M602 motorways.

Once known for its mining community, Boothstown is now a mainly residential area.

== History ==
Evidence of the Romans in this area is that in 1947, workmen digging in Boothstown at grid reference SD72160108 discovered a hoard of over 550 bronze Roman coins dating between 259 AD and 278 AD. A second hoard of coins dated 289 - 296 A.D. was found at Boothsbank in 1989.

=== Manor ===
In 1323 the estate or manor of Booths was held by the de Worsley family and remained with that family, held of the king by a rent of 2s, until the reign of Elizabeth I. In the 17th century the manor was held by Charnock and then by Sherington. Booths Old Hall was built about 1343 and New Booths Hall was built in the early-17th century. The hearth-tax returns of 1666 show nearby Wardley Hall was the largest residence with 19 hearths, Worsley Hall and Booths had 17 each. There were 276 hearths in the township, Worsley proper had 191. The house, in the latter part of the 18th century, was owned by the Clowes family who owned Garrett Hall in neighbouring Tyldesley. Lord Francis Egerton bought the estate from Robert Haldane Bradshaw in 1836 and Booths and became part of the Manor of Worsley.

=== Industrial Revolution ===
Boothstown Mines Rescue Station

In 1795 the Bridgewater Canal was extended from Worsley, through Boothstown to Leigh. The growth of Boothstown was based on coal and cotton. Cookes Meadow Pit at Ellenbrook dated from 1760-70 but deep mining came with the sinking of Mosley Common Colliery in the 1860s. An early colliery tramway moved coal from the pits at Ellenbrook down to the canal at Boothstown Basin by gravity, using the slope of the land.

Boothstown's underground canal, the Chaddock Level, was used to transport coal during the 19th century. It connected the Bridgewater Canal at a small basin approximately 100m east of Moss House Lane to Chaddock Colliery, the Queen Anne Pit (1810 to 1820) and Henfold Pit in Tyldesley. The keystone on the entrance to the Chaddock Level is dated 1816. The pits on the Tyldesley side of Boothstown had closed by 1870. In 1931 Boothstown Mines Rescue Station was built along with housing for the rescue team members and other staff, it is a Grade II Listed building.

A Mr Smith built a small cotton mill in Boothstown Delph by the Stirrup Brook in 1812. In 1891 Edward Makin of Garden Mill had 260 looms weaving "regattas, stripes, ginghams etc." and William Yates' Boothstown Mill had 9,000 spindles and 242 looms producing fine quality cotton from 1875 until the mill closed in 1968.

=== Modern history ===
The M60 motorway was constructed to the east of Boothstown in the 1970s (originally as the M62). The Royal Horticultural Society opened a national garden at Bridgewater in 2021.

== Governance ==
From the 11th century, Boothstown was part of the township of Worsley in the ancient ecclesiastical parish Eccles in the hundred of Salford, and county of Lancashire.

Boothstown is represented in the UK parliament by Barbara Keeley, Labour MP for Worsley & Eccles South.

The Boothstown and Ellenbrook ward of Salford City Council is represented by three Conservative councillors: Les Turner, Darren Ward and Bob Clarke.

== Geography ==
The A572 crosses Boothstown west to east connecting it to Worsley and Wigan. the A580 East Lancashire Road is now the boundary between Tyldesley and Boothstown and crosses west to east at the northern edge of the village. The Bridgewater Canal crosses east to west in the south of the village.

There is agricultural and open land in the south of the Boothstown area that forms part of the Green Belt. To the south of the Bridgewater Canal the Geological Formation consists mainly of the pebble beds of the new red sandstone, north of Boothstown are coal measures.

== Transport ==
Boothstown is served by bus routes to/from Salford, Manchester city centre, Walkden, Wigan and Leigh.

Services include: 29-Boothstown-Swinton-MediaCityUK, 35-Manchester-Leigh-Bryn 126-Leigh-M60-The Trafford Centre, 132-Wigan-M60-The Trafford Centre, 553-Astley Green-Walkden-Farnworth.

Services V1 and V2 stop near Boothstown, serving Newearth Rd and East Lancs Rd, A580

== Notable people ==
Elizabeth Wolstenholme, the suffragist ran a private boarding school in Boothstown in the early 1860s.

Cameron Brannagan, footballer who captains Oxford United and has made over 300 appearances for the club.

Arthur Thomas Doodson, mathematician and oceanographer whose expertise in tidal prediction played a significant role in deciding the date for the Normandy landings.

Aaron Skinner, footballer who plays for Hereford F.C.
