= A580 road =

Road in England

A580

Route information
- Length: 29.5 mi (47.5 km)
- History: Construction began 29 April 1929 and finished in 1934

Major junctions
- West end: Kirkdale, Liverpool
- A5058 M57; A59 A5207 A5208 A570 A571; A58; A49; M6 A573 A572 A579 A574 A577 A575 M61 M60 A5185 A666; A6
- East end: Irlams o' th' Height, Salford (A6)

Location
- Country: United Kingdom
- Primary destinations: St Helens, Leigh, Manchester, Liverpool

Road network
- Roads in the United Kingdom; Motorways; A and B road zones

The A580 (officially the Liverpool–East Lancashire Road, colloquially the East Lancs) is the United Kingdom's first purpose-built A road. The road was officially opened by King George V on 18 July 1934. Despite its name, the actual road runs through the modern day metropolitan counties of Merseyside and Greater Manchester which were historically in Lancashire when the road was built until 1974. Notable towns and cities along the route include Liverpool, Kirkby, St. Helens, Leigh, Swinton and Salford. It was described as "Britain's biggest road" at the time.

== Purpose ==
The road was built to provide better access between the Port of Liverpool and the industrial areas of East Lancashire around Manchester. The new high-quality trunk road would supersede the indirect and heavily built-up A57 through Prescot, Warrington and Eccles. Journey times for road haulage would be reduced to under an hour.

This road was built with a 1930s Dutch-style cycle path running its entire length. Many roads at this time were built with cycle paths, but most have been lost due to road widening schemes.

== History ==
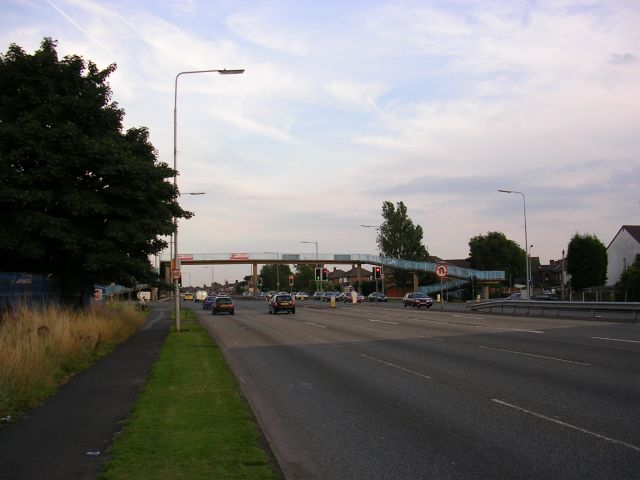
A section of the "East Lancs Road" at Wardley in the City of Salford.

=== First phase (completed) ===
The first part, which was completed within three years, was from Walton, Liverpool, to the junction with the A6 at Irlams o' th' Height in Salford. The 29.5-mile (47.5 km) road was constructed in an almost straight alignment with few curves.

To be a high-speed trunk route, its 1930s planners designed some parts to be three roads in one. The central section was exclusively for through traffic while adjacent side roads—either side of the main carriageway—provided local access. Although the sections within Liverpool were dual carriageway from the beginning, a few short stretches through Salford continue to use the original three-lane layout. The rest of the road was converted to dual with a central reservation in the 1950s and 1960s. Many of the original 1930s bridges remain; they were built from steel in preparation for any future expansion, as they would be easier to replace than ones constructed from moulded concrete.

The road remains the UK's largest pre-motorway project. In 2004 the Highways Agency detrunked the road, passing control and maintenance over to the local authorities along its route.

=== Second phase (never developed) ===
With the completion of the first phase, the next stage was to extend the road beyond Salford and into East Lancashire proper. However, this was never undertaken. Its failure was largely due to the road's location. Despite linking North West England's largest cities, the East Lancs remained isolated from the rest of the UK's national road network. Both ends of the highway began in high-density urban areas that were not close to any comparable infrastructure that could assist rapid transit connections.

By 1942, proposals were put forward to extend the A580 across the Pennines to Hull on the east coast of Britain. Although this plan never came to fruition, its purpose became the foundation for the construction of the M62 motorway in 1960.

== Gallery ==
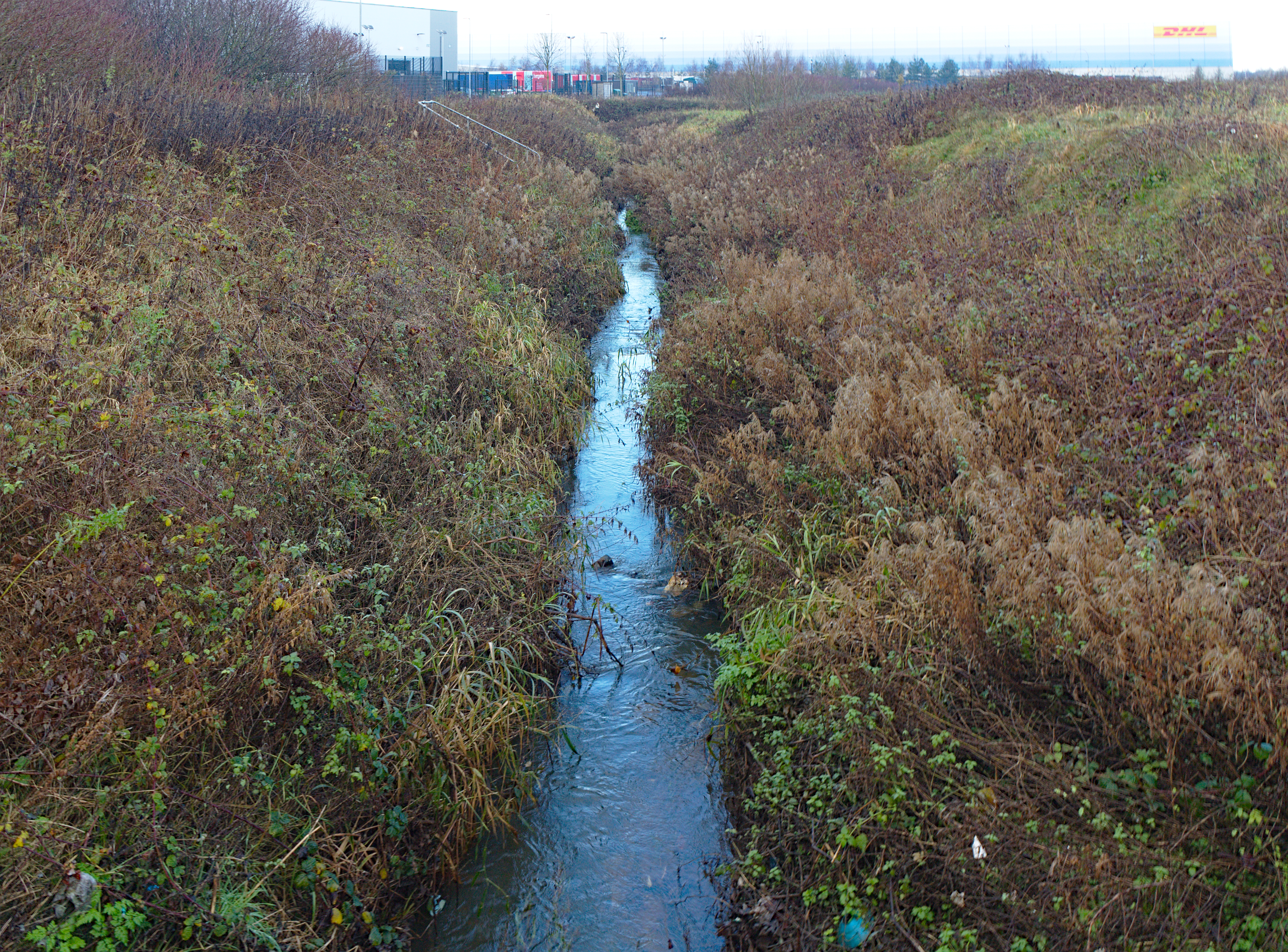
View from the bridge on the A580 slip road

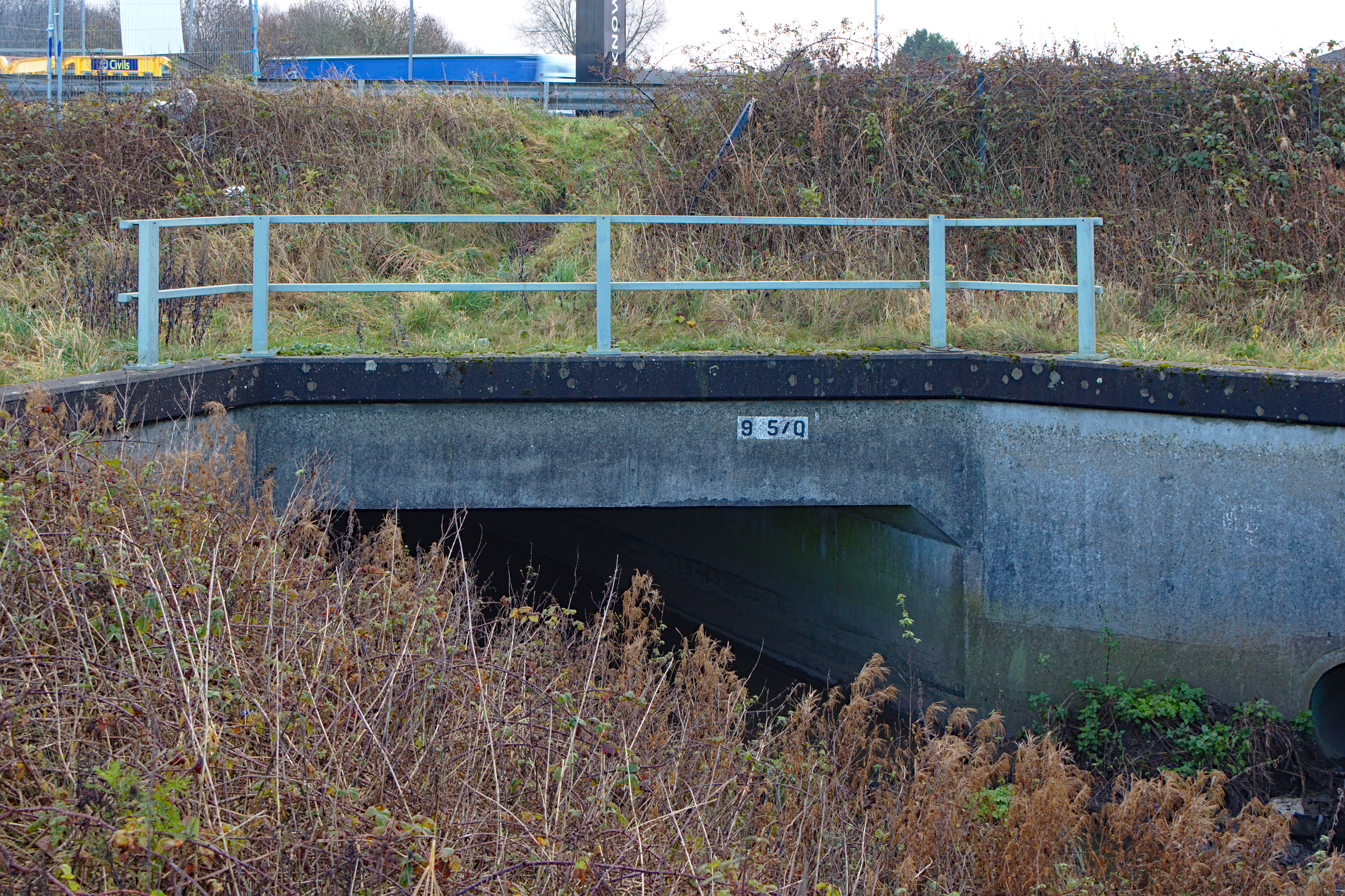
A580 bridge over Croxteth Brook 3.jpg
