= Roe Green =

Coordinates: 53.512°N 2.377°W

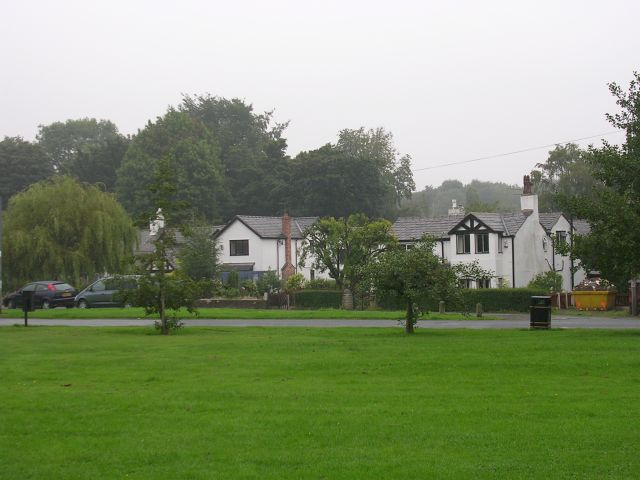
- Roe Green village green

- Location within Greater Manchester
- OS grid reference: SD750017
- Metropolitan borough: City of Salford
- Metropolitan county: Greater Manchester
- Region: North West
- Country: England
- Sovereign state: United Kingdom
- Post town: MANCHESTER
- Postcode district: M28
- Dialling code: 0161
- Police: Greater Manchester
- Fire: Greater Manchester
- Ambulance: North West
- UK Parliament: Worsley and Eccles South

Roe Green is a suburban area of Worsley, in the City of Salford, Greater Manchester, England. Historically in Lancashire, it was anciently a hamlet built around what is now the village green. It is the largest of the City of Salford's conservation areas, selected because of its village green, an unusual feature in the region. Roe Green is adjacent to junction 13 of the M60 motorway.

== History ==
Roe Green was first mentioned in a land dispute between Gilbert Sherrington of Wardley Hall and Richard Brereton of Worsley. Roe Green became part of the manor of Worsley where it remained until 1899 when control passed to Worsley Urban District Council from the Bridgewater Trustees.

The green was unenclosed common land, used for grazing with a pinfold where stray animals were kept until released on the payment of a fine. The western end of Roe Green was named Beesley Green after a family who farmed there. At the end of the 18th century, the settlements grew considerably and many of the cottages, built by the Duke of Bridgewater, date from this period. These include Beesley Hall, a farmhouse that was converted in the mid-19th century into three cottages. The inhabitants worked in the Duke of Bridgewater's coal mines, in agriculture and, until the arrival of cotton mills, in handloom weaving.

== Transport ==
Beesley Green was separated from Roe Green in the 1860s when the London and North Western Railway Company opened the Tyldesley Loopline from Eccles to Wigan via Tyldesley dividing the green. In 1870 a colliery line to Bolton via Little Hulton was opened making Roe Green a junction. The railway lines closed in 1969 and the disused railway cutting dividing the two greens has been re-developed as a linear walkway.

== Sport ==
The green was used for sporting activities and in late Victorian days was used for cricket matches between the 'Up-Greeners' and 'Down-Greeners'. The brothers J.T. and Ernest Tyldesley played cricket for Lancashire and England in the early years of the 20th century. Their great nephew Michael Vaughan, who lived in the village in his early years played for Yorkshire and captained England. Roe Green is also home to Roe Green cricket club playing in the Greater Manchester Cricket league.
