= Roscoe =

Roscoe, also spelled Rosco or Roscow, may refer to:

== People ==
- Roscoe (name)

== Places ==
=== United States ===
- Roscoe, California, now Sun Valley, Los Angeles
- Roscoe, Georgia, an unincorporated community
- Roscoe, Illinois, a village
- Roscoe, Minnesota, a city
- Roscoe, Goodhue County, Minnesota, an unincorporated community
- Roscoe, Missouri, a village
- Roscoe, Montana, a settlement
- Roscoe, Nebraska, an unincorporated community and census-designated place
- Roscoe, New York, a hamlet
- Roscoe, Pennsylvania, a borough
- Roscoe, South Dakota, a city
- Roscoe, Texas, a town
- Roscoe Village, a neighborhood in North Center, Chicago, Illinois
- Roscoe Village (Coshocton, Ohio)
- Roscoe Independent School District, Texas
- Roscoe Township (disambiguation)

=== Canada ===
- Roscoe River, Nunavut and the Northwest Territories, Canada
- Roscoe Glacier, Queen Mary Land, Antarctica

== Other uses ==
- Roscoe's House of Chicken 'n Waffles, a popular California restaurant chain
- Roscoe Wind Farm, Roscoe, Texas
- ROSCO, an acronym for British railway rolling stock companies
- Roscoe (Los Angeles Metro station)
- Roscoe (novel), by William Kennedy
- "Roscoe" (song), a song by Midlake
- "Roscoe" type displacement lubricator, invented by James Roscoe
- Roscoe (software product), a software program used on mainframe computers
- Roscoe (dog), pet dog owned by British racing driver Lewis Hamilton

== See also ==
- Rosko (disambiguation)
