= Rascoe =

Rascoe is a surname. Notable people with the surname include:

- Bobby Rascoe (born 1940), American basketball player
- Burton Rascoe (1892–1957), American journalist, editor and literary critic
- Judith Rascoe (born 1941), American screenwriter

== See also ==
- Roscoe (name)
