= Austin 25/30 =

Car model

Austin 25-30
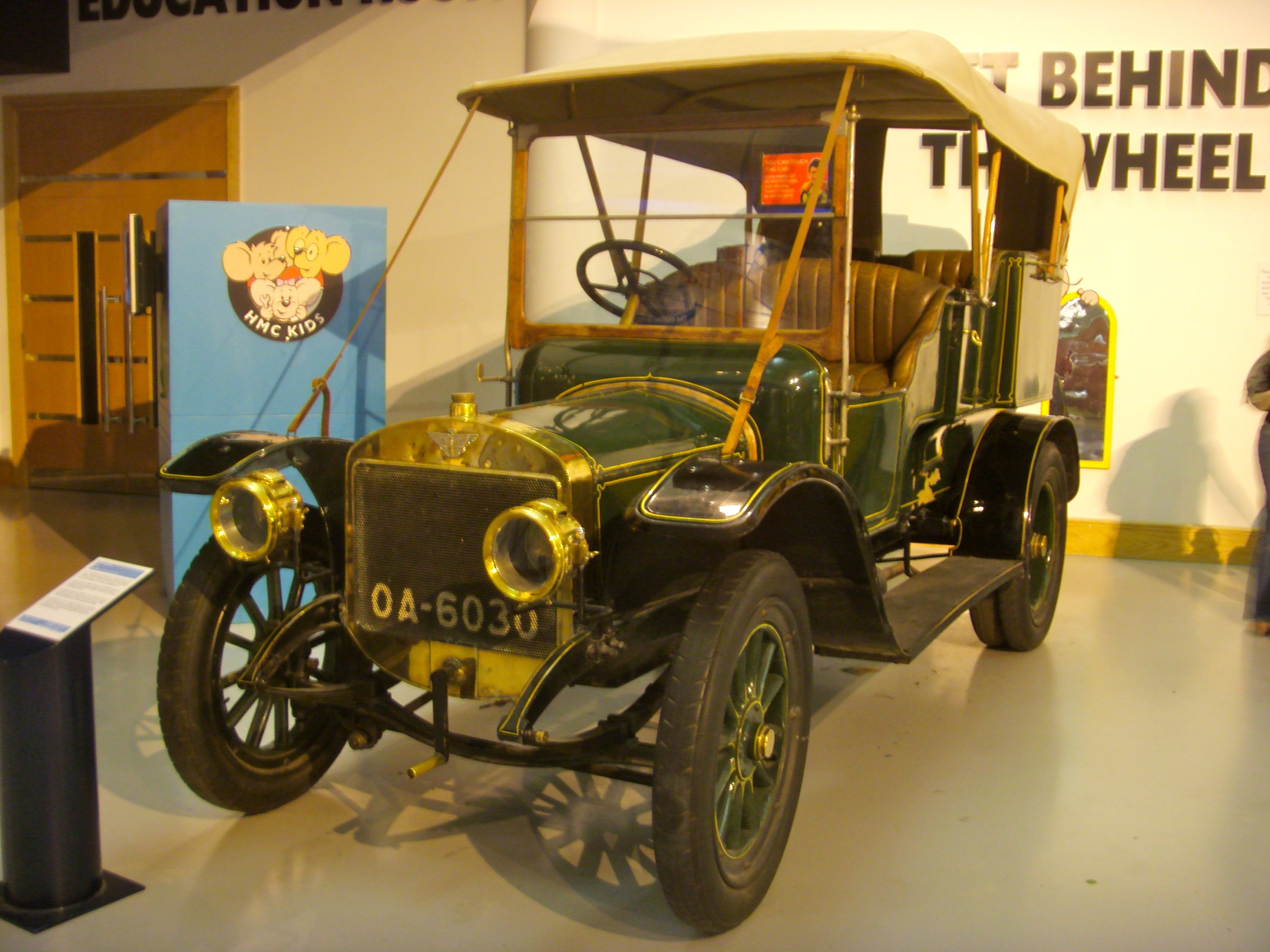
- The oldest Austin, 1907; Heritage Motor Centre, Gaydon

Overview
- Manufacturer: Austin
- Production: 1906–1907
- Assembly: Longbridge plant, Birmingham, United Kingdom

Powertrain
- Engine: 4-cylinder 5,182cc T-head
- Transmission: 4-speed gearbox

Chronology
- Successor: Austin 40 hp

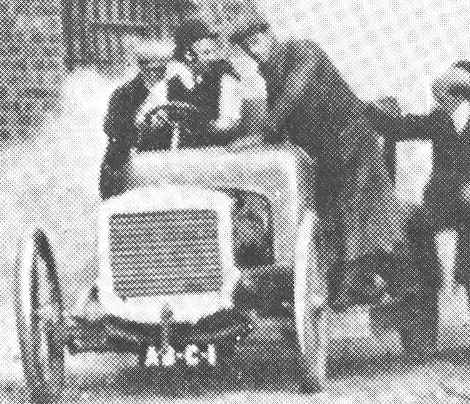
The first Austin, a 25-30, sets out for its first trial run. Herbert Austin at the wheel. Saturday 7 April 1906

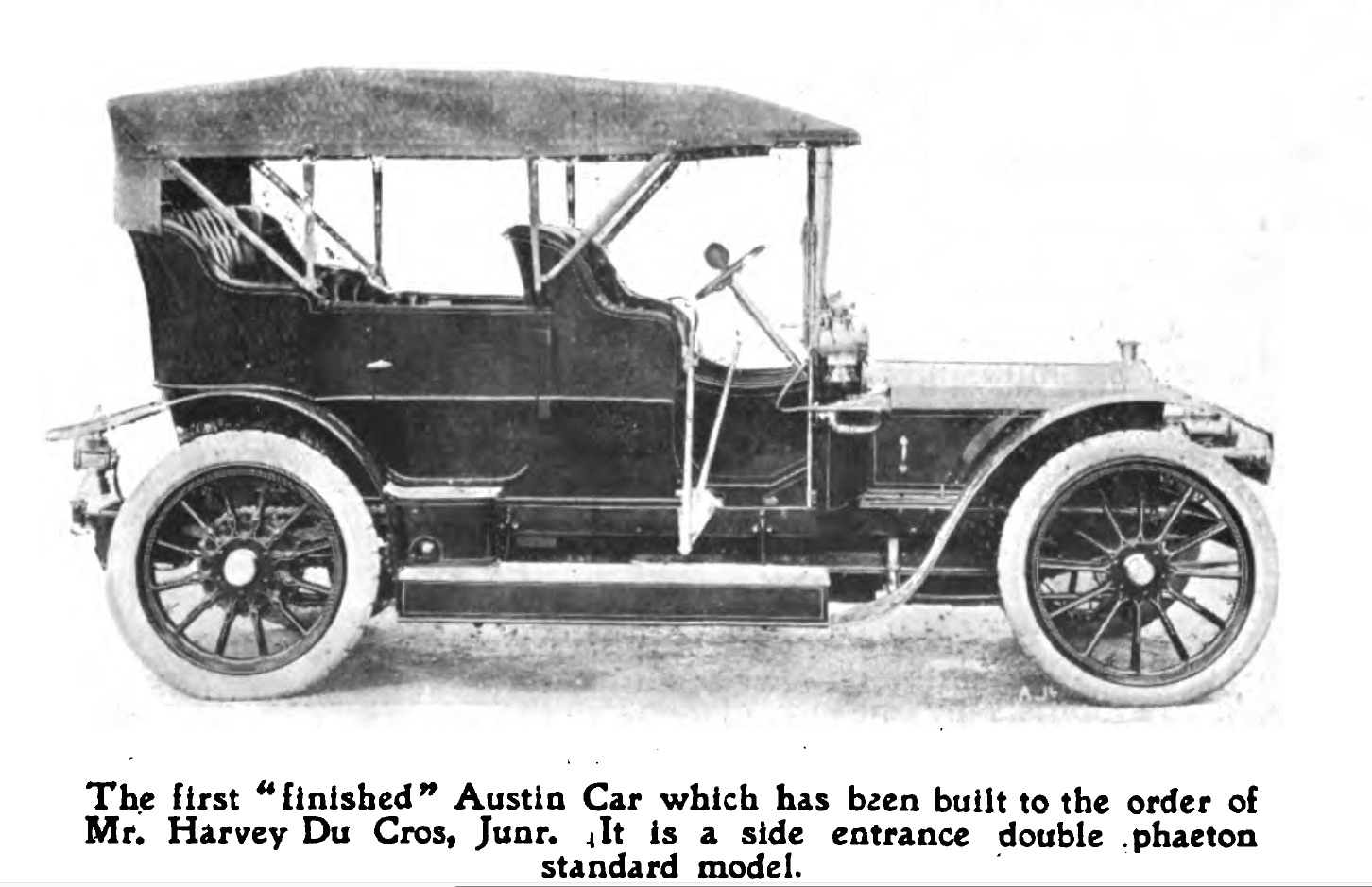
Austin's first finished car this photograph published 30 June 1906

The Austin 25-30 is a motor car. It was the first automobile produced by newly established British car manufacturer Austin.

In the last week of April 1906 a large body of motorists travelled to Longbridge "where snow lay full three inches deep on the ground and was still falling fast" to see the new Austin car, a conventional four-cylinder model with chain drive. The engine's tax horsepower rating would have been 32 hp (24 kW). It was also available in a cheaper version as a 15/20 hp (Note: The 15-20 used the same engine as the 25-30 except that the cylinder bores were only 4 inches (100 mm) not 4 1/2 inches (110 mm). The following year with a slightly increased bore, 4 1/8 in (100 mm), the 15-20 was sold as Austin's 18-24) complete at £500 (chassis, £425) as well as the 25/30 hp for £650 (chassis, £550). The sole concessionaire for sale of the cars was Mr Harvey du Cros junior (1872–1928).

Between April and October 1906 only 23 cars, mostly 25-30s were sold. This was minute when compared with the output of the whole British motor industry. In the following 12 months to October 1907 147 cars of all models were sold.

The 25-30 was manufactured for more than a year with a total of 65 cars produced. It was replaced in 1907 by the Austin 40 hp which used a bored-out 4 3/4 in × 5 in (120 mm × 130 mm) and simplified 25-30 engine.

== Chassis ==
The frame was made of very stiff section steel. A subframe was provided to make the engine clutch and gearbox one unit. By the standards of its day the chassis was entirely orthodox but it was of first class quality and provided excellent reliability.

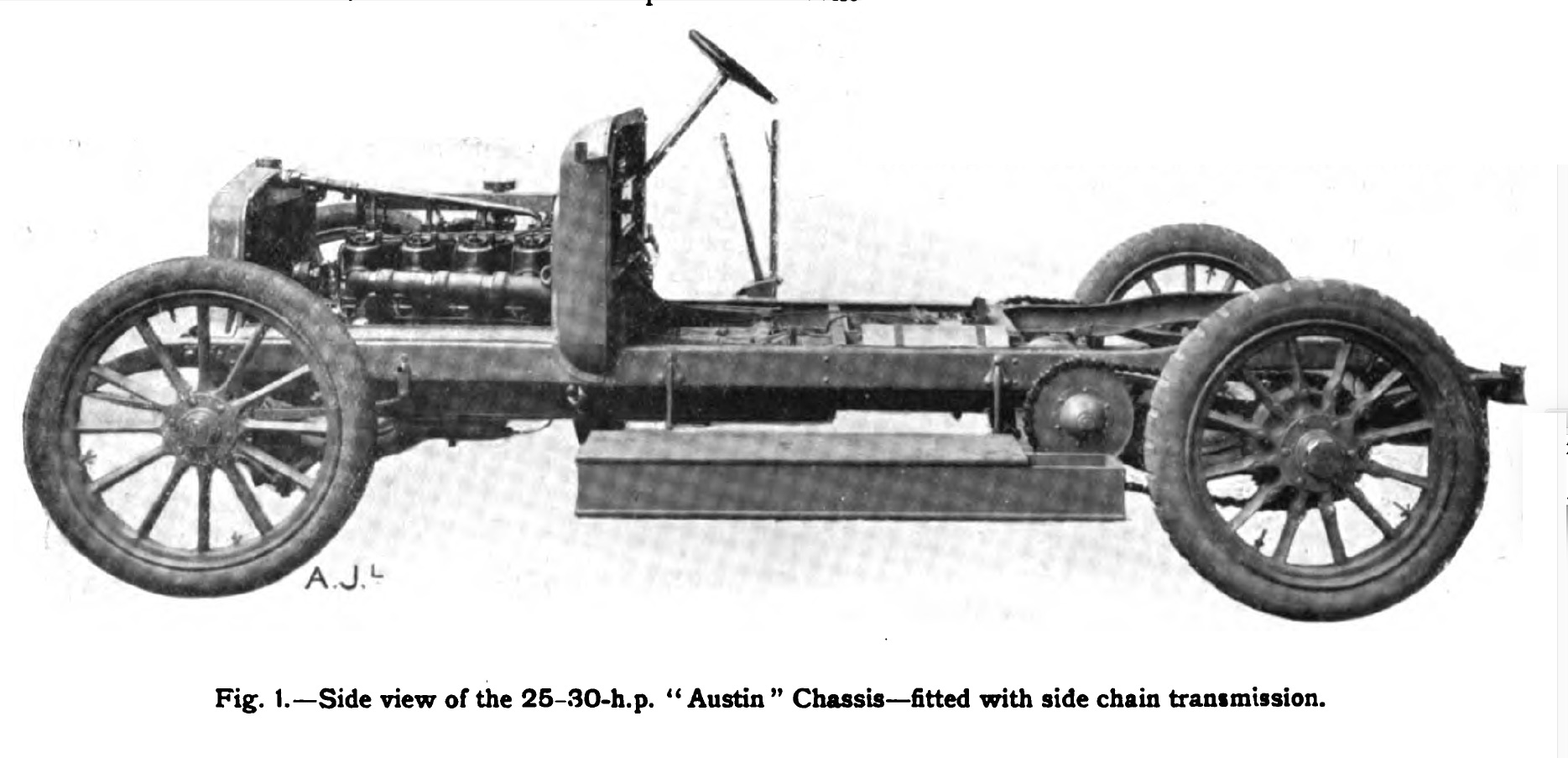

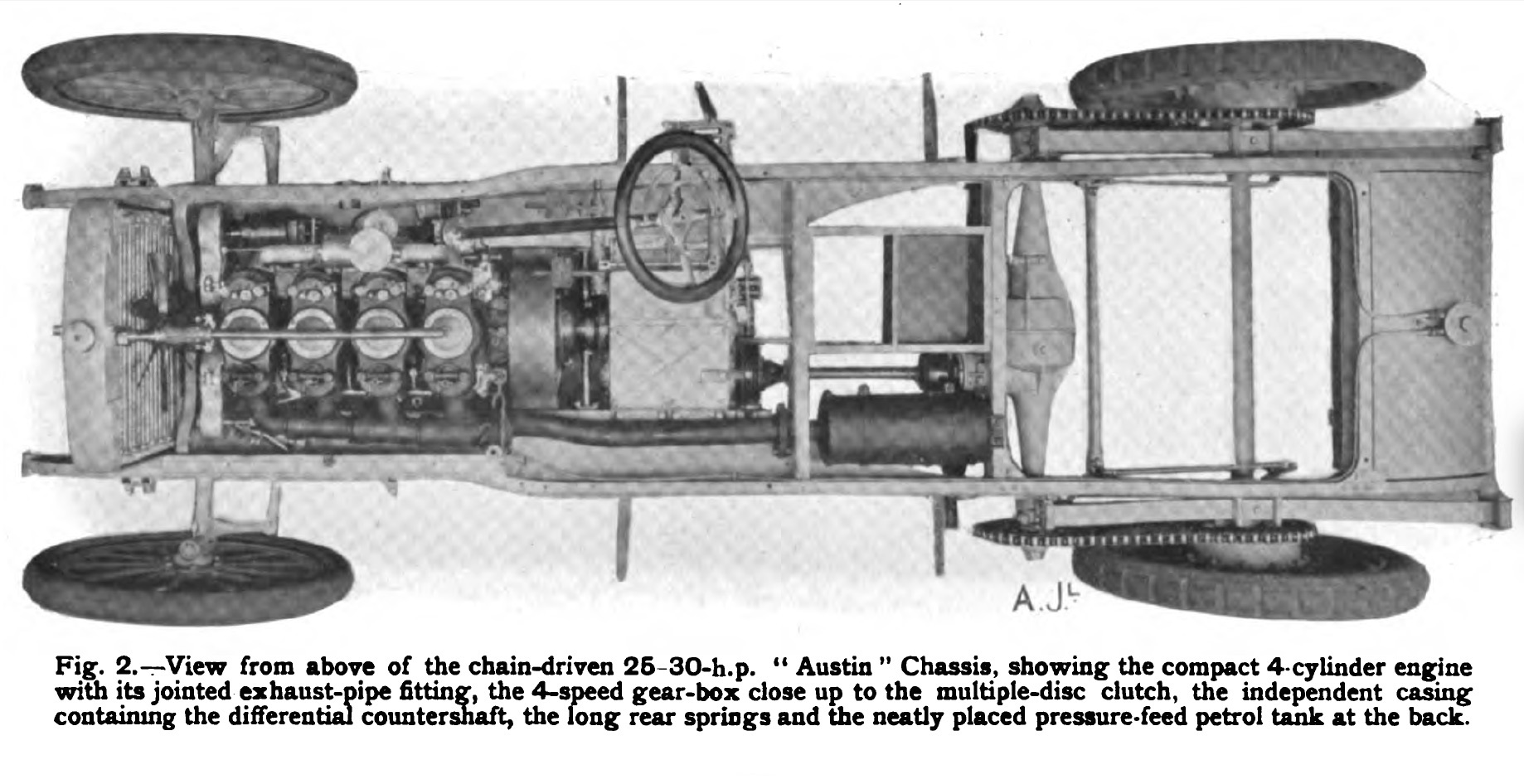

== Engine ==
Austin 25-30
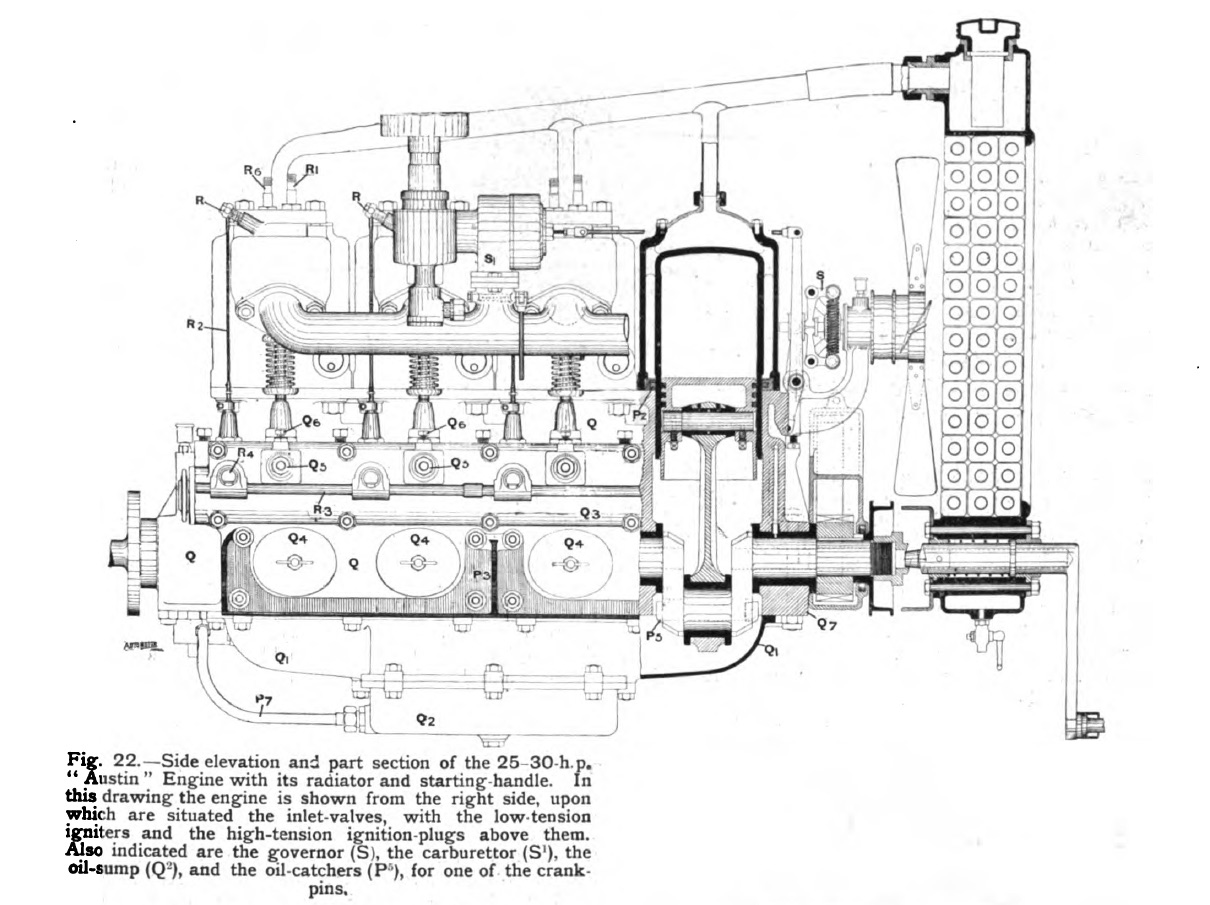

Overview
- Manufacturer: Austin Motor Company

Layout
- Configuration: straight four
- Displacement: 318 cu in (5,182 cc)
- Cylinder bore: 4.5 in (115 mm)
- Piston stroke: 5 in (127 mm)

Output
- Power output: 23 bhp (17 kW; 23 PS) @900 rpm Tax horsepower 32.8

Chronology
- Successor: Austin 40 hp

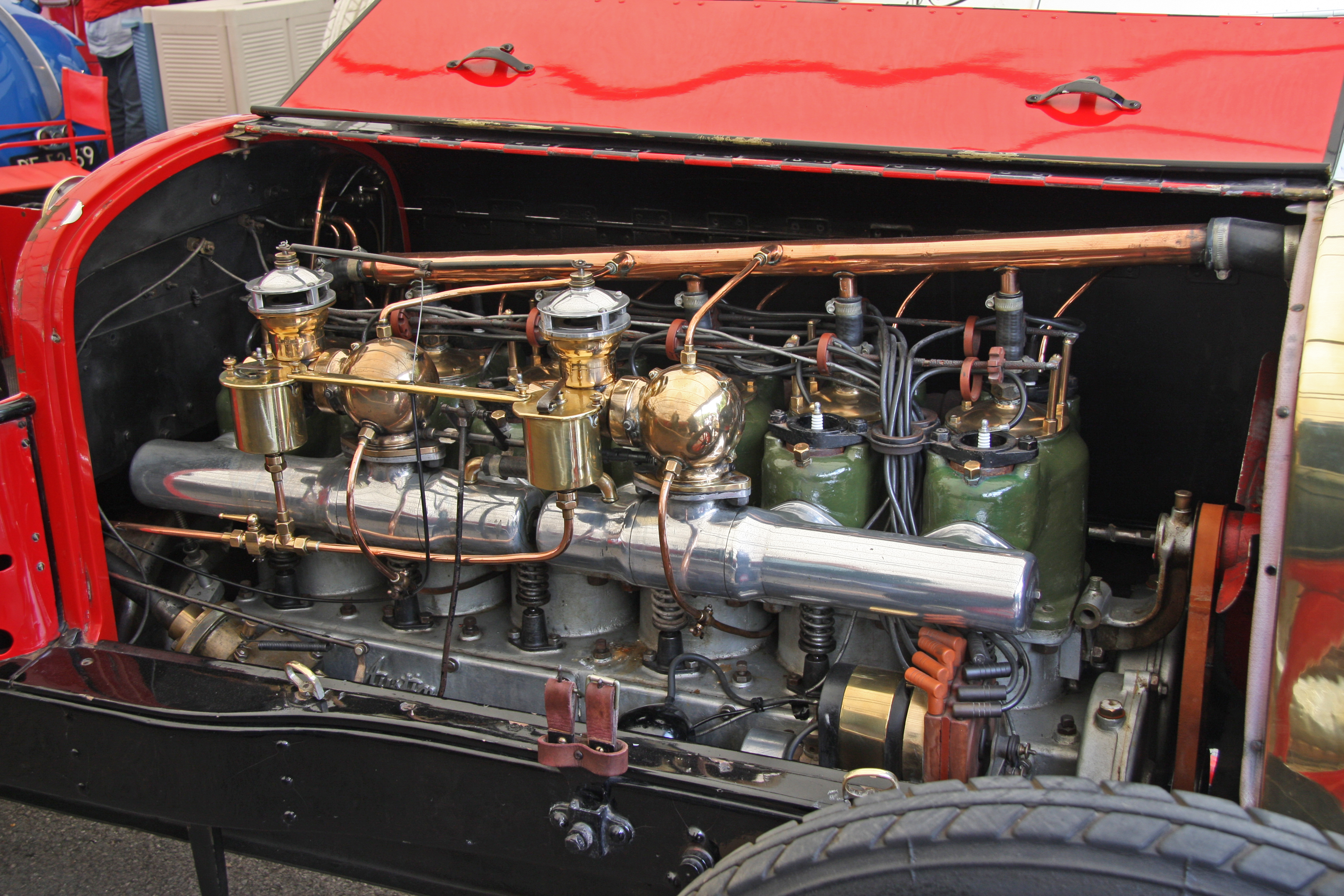
Austin Grand Prix engine 1908 2 more cylinders, 1 more carburettor

Previous Herbert Austin cars for Wolseley Motors, which Austin founded, kept horizontal engines after vertical engines became the norm. Herbert Austin allowed his refusal to specify vertical engines to become the contract-breaking component of his disagreements with the Wolseley directors. He would provide a list of very pressing reasons for giving preference to horizontal engines. This 25-30, the first car bearing his own name, had a vertical engine. Either Austin reviewed his stance and changed it or his backers made him change.

This vertical straight 4-cylinder 318 cu in (5185 cc) T-head engine with 4 1/2 bore x 5 in stroke (114 mm x 127 mm) was automatically governed to a maximum of 900 rpm.

=== Cylinder block ===
Each cylinder is a separate casting.

=== Fuel system ===
The carburettor is an automatic diaphragm Krebs type. The automatic throttle is coupled to the centrifugal governor which is mounted on the same shaft as the fan and can only be controlled by the accelerator pedal. The magneto is driven from the inlet valves' camshaft as is also the commutator and the pump for the engine lubrication system.

=== Dual ignition ===
On the right hand side of the engine there is dual ignition at each cylinder first from the magneto supplying low-tension power to complex ignitors inside the inlet valve caps and again from conventional high-tension sparking plugs through a distributor from the accumulator (battery) dynamo and coil. The low tension igniter and the high tension sparking plug are mounted on the inspection cover above the inlet valves.

A low tension make-and-break contact spindle rises diagonally from its camshaft through the main casting so it makes or breaks contact with the insulated contact pillar on the inlet valve cap. The necessary quick-break action comes from a coil spring at the bottom of the spindle. The high-tension sparking plugs are close alongside the contact pillars.

=== Valve and ignition camshafts ===
The exhaust poppet valves are on the other side of the engine. Arranged symmetrically at the top of the engine the inlet and exhaust valves are interchangeable.

The valves have a detachable cover over each valve giving easy access for adjusting seating or complete withdrawal. Between the cams and tappets there are fingers which can be set with the engine running. There is a similar arrangement for the ignition tappets. However the timing of the ignition can be varied with a lever above the steering wheel. The lever moves a timing shaft which moves the tappet pivot-pins inward or outward. The axis of the commutator shaft rocks at the same time. This arrangement brought about oil sealing problems when pressure lubrication became more complicated. The spur wheels that operate the two camshafts are enclosed in a neat dust-proof casing.

=== Cooling ===
There is a centrifugal water pump mounted on the front left of the crankcase casting to draw cooled water from the bottom of the radiator. Independently formed jackets surround each cylinder to carry the cooling water. When cast the lower end of the jacket is completely open. A dome-shaped fitting is inserted at the top for hot water to return to the radiator and the bottom is closed by the exterior of the cylinder casting. This form of construction is to eliminate any chance of overheating from undetected air pockets.

=== Crankcase ===
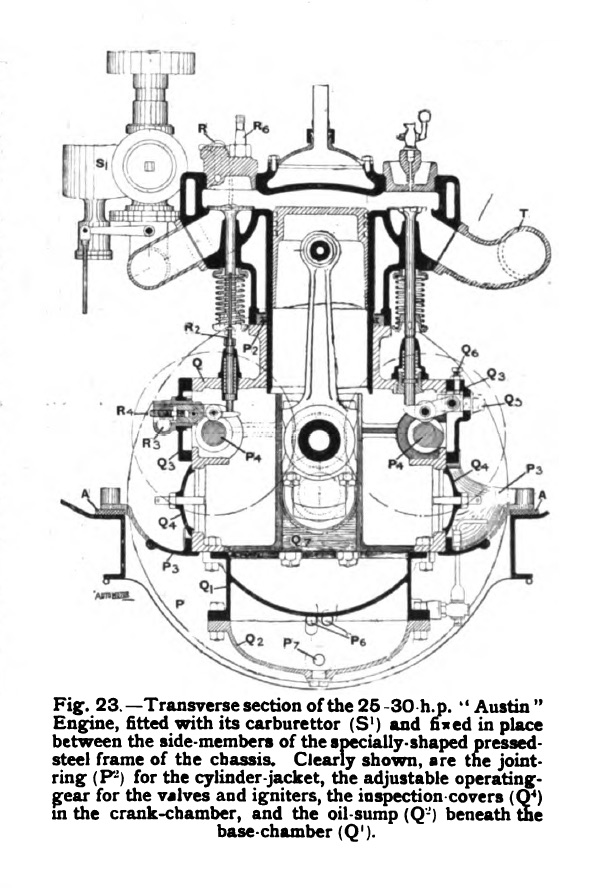
T-head engine

A rectangular cross-section aluminium casting holds the five main bearings and the bearings for the two camshafts. This makes the sump below the crankcase independent and its removal does not disturb the engine's crankshaft or its bearings. Either camshaft can be removed sideways at any time through large doors which also give access to the small rock-levers through which the cams operate the pushrods. Another set of detachable doors on each side gives access to each big end bearing. The aluminium casting forming the crankcase rests on two cast-steel cradles which firmly hold the engine in the chassis.

=== Engine lubrication ===
Oil is drawn from the sump by the oil pump and delivered to the three inner main bearings and to the other bearings within the crank chamber. Oil is led into the centre of the crankpins by oil scoops which lubricate the big end bearings from inside. The end main bearings and each of the four cylinders receive measured doses of oil through a mechanical automatic lubricator. This lubricator, driven by chain, contains positive pumps to force the oil through each of six feed-pipes. Mounted on the dashboard the lubricator's sight glasses give visual confirmation oil is circulating.

Key to engine diagrams (Note: Key to engine diagrams P fly-wheel: 1 dust proof cover for camshafts; 2 special joint ring for the cylinder water jacket; 3 cast steel cradles; 4 camshaft; 5 oil catchers / scoops for crankpins; 6 return oil pipes to sump; 7 oil supply pipe to oil pump; 8 centrifugal water pump; Q crankcase casting: 1 base chamber; 2 oil sump; 3 castings carrying cam gear; 4 inspection covers in crankcase by big ends; 5 fulcrum pins for rock levers; 6 adjustment screws to "time" exhaust valves; 7 main bearing caps; R igniter rockers, low-tension make-and-break contact spindle: 1 insulated contact pillar; 2 tappet rod igniters; 3 low tension magneto AND timing shaft; 4 adjustment screw; 5 magneto; 6 high tension ignition plugs; 7 commutator; S governor: 1 carburettor; T exhaust manifold: 1 asbestos packing rings; 2 glands; 3 baffles)

== Transmission ==
The car was fitted with a four-speed gearbox and multiple disc clutch. In the first production car power was transmitted to the back wheels from the differential by chains though this system was noisy. A bevel-geared live rear axle was also available.

final drive	calendar 1906	calendar 1907	calendar 1908
chain	24	25	1
live axle	3	12	0
