= Roscoe (name) =

Roscoe (also spelled Rosco, Roscow, and Ruscoe) is a Cornish name originating from the Old Norse words for "doe wood" or "roebuck copse". It is also an Americanized spelling of the French name Racicot, and possibly a corruption of Roscrowe.

== People with the given name ==
- Roscoe Arbuckle (1877–1933), American silent film star
- Roscoe Bartlett (born 1926), U.S. Representative from the state of Maryland
- Roscoe Beck, American bass guitarist and record producer
- Roscoe Bellamy (born 2000), American professional pickleball player
- Roscoe Born (1950–2020), American actor
- Roscoe Brady (1923–2016), American biochemist
- Roscoe Brown (1922–2016), US Army Air Force pilot
- Roscoe Lee Browne (1925–2007), American actor and director
- Roscoe Bulmer (1874–1919), US Navy captain
- Roscoe Conkling (1829–1888), American politician
- Roscoe G. Dickinson (1894–1945), American chemist
- Roscoe Dixon (1949–2021), American politician
- Roscoe D'Sane (born 1980), English footballer
- Roscoe Goose (1891–1971), American jockey
- Rosco Gordon (1928–2002), American blues singer and songwriter
- Roscoe H. Hillenkoetter (1897–1982), US Navy vice admiral and first director of the Central Intelligence Agency
- Roscoe Holcomb (1912–1981), American singer and musician
- Roscoe Karns (1891–1970), American actor
- Roscoe R. Koch (1887–1963), American politician
- Roscoe C. McCulloch (1880–1958), American politician
- Rosco McGlashan (born 1950), Australian drag racing driver
- Roscoe Miller (1876–1913), American Major League Baseball pitcher
- Roscoe Mitchell (born 1940), African-American composer, jazz instrumentalist and educator,
- Roscoe Nicholson (1887–1959), American surveyor and conservationist
- Roscoe Orman (born 1944), American actor and comedian best known for playing Gordon on Sesame Street
- Roscoe Parrish (born 1982), American National Football League wide receiver
- Roscoe C. Patterson (1876–1954), American Senator and US Representative from Missouri
- Roscoe Pondexter (born 1952), American basketball player
- Roscoe Pound (1870–1964), American legal scholar and educator
- Roscoe Reynolds (born 1942), US Senator from Virginia
- Roscoe Robinson, Jr. (1928–1993), first African American four-star general in the US Army
- Roscoe Sarles (1892–1922), American race car driver
- Roscow Shedden, Anglican Bishop of Nassau (1919–1931)
- Roscoe Shelton (1931–2002), American electric blues and R&B singer
- Roscoe Tanner (born 1951), American tennis player
- Roscoe Thompson (1922–1988), American NASCAR driver
- Roscoe Troxler (1883–1976), American jockey
- Roscoe Turner (1895–1970), American aviator
- Roscoe B. Woodruff (1891–1975), American major general

== People with the surname ==
- Alan Roscoe (1888–1933), American film actor
- Andy Roscoe (born 1973), English footballer
- Bill Roscoe (born 1956), British professor of computing
- B. J. Rosco (born 1932), American composer
- Francis James Roscoe (1831–1878), Canadian entrepreneur and politician
- Henry Enfield Roscoe (1833–1915), English chemist and university vice-chancellor
- Ingrid Roscoe (1944–2020), British art historian and Lord Lieutenant of West Yorkshire
- James Roscoe (disambiguation), several people
- Kenneth H. Roscoe (1914–1970), British civil engineer
- Margaret Roscoe (c. 1786 – 1840), English botanical illustrator and author whose standard author abbreviation is M.Roscoe
- Martin Roscoe (born 1952), English classical pianist
- Patrick Roscoe (born 1962), Canadian writer
- Samantha Roscoe (born 1995), Australian-British basketball player
- Theodore Roscoe (1906–1992), American writer
- Will Roscoe (born 1964), American activist and author
- William Roscoe (1753–1831), English historian and botanist whose standard author abbreviation is Roscoe
- William Caldwell Roscoe (1823–1859), English journalist and poet
- Alan Ruscoe (born 1972), British actor
- Melissa Ruscoe (born 1976), New Zealand association football and rugby player
- Scott Ruscoe (born 1977), Welsh footballer and manager
- Sybil Ruscoe (born 1960), English radio and television presenter

== People with the nickname or stage name ==
- Roscoe Dash, stage name of American rapper Jeffery Johnson Jr. (born 1990)
- Lewis De Payne, American Computer Hacker using the handle Rosco or Roscoe
- Ross Taylor ("Roscoe" Taylor) (born 1984), New Zealand cricketer
- Herman "Roscoe" Ernest III (1951–2011), American drummer
- Roscoe (rapper) (born 1983), brother of Kurupt
- Bronco Mendenhall (born 1966), Brigham Young University football coach
- Ian Ross (newsreader) (1940–2014), Australian news presenter
- Sterling Roswell, drummer in the British band Spacemen 3
- Terry Ruskowski (born 1954), Canadian National Hockey League player nicknamed "Roscow"

== Fictional characters ==
- Sheriff Rosco P. Coltrane, from The Dukes of Hazzard
- Michael J. Roscoe and his son Paul Roscoe, from the second book in Anthony Horowitz's Alex Rider series, Point Blanc
- Roscoe, mascot of the Milwaukee Admirals minor league hockey team
- Roscoe, character from the British Channel 4 programme Shameless
- Roscoe Babatunde, character from the British Channel 4 programme It's a Sin
- Roscoe Conklin, police officer in the American TV Series Reacher
- Roscoe, character from Oliver & Company
- Roscoe family, characters in the British soap opera Hollyoaks
- Roscoe Rodriguez, the main protagonist of the British comic book series MPH
- Roscoe Sweeney, character in the newspaper comic strip Buz Sawyer
- Roscoe Sweeney, character from Marvel's Daredevil
- Roscoe, from The Killing Floor by Lee Child

== See also ==
- Roscoe (disambiguation)
