= Austin 40 hp =

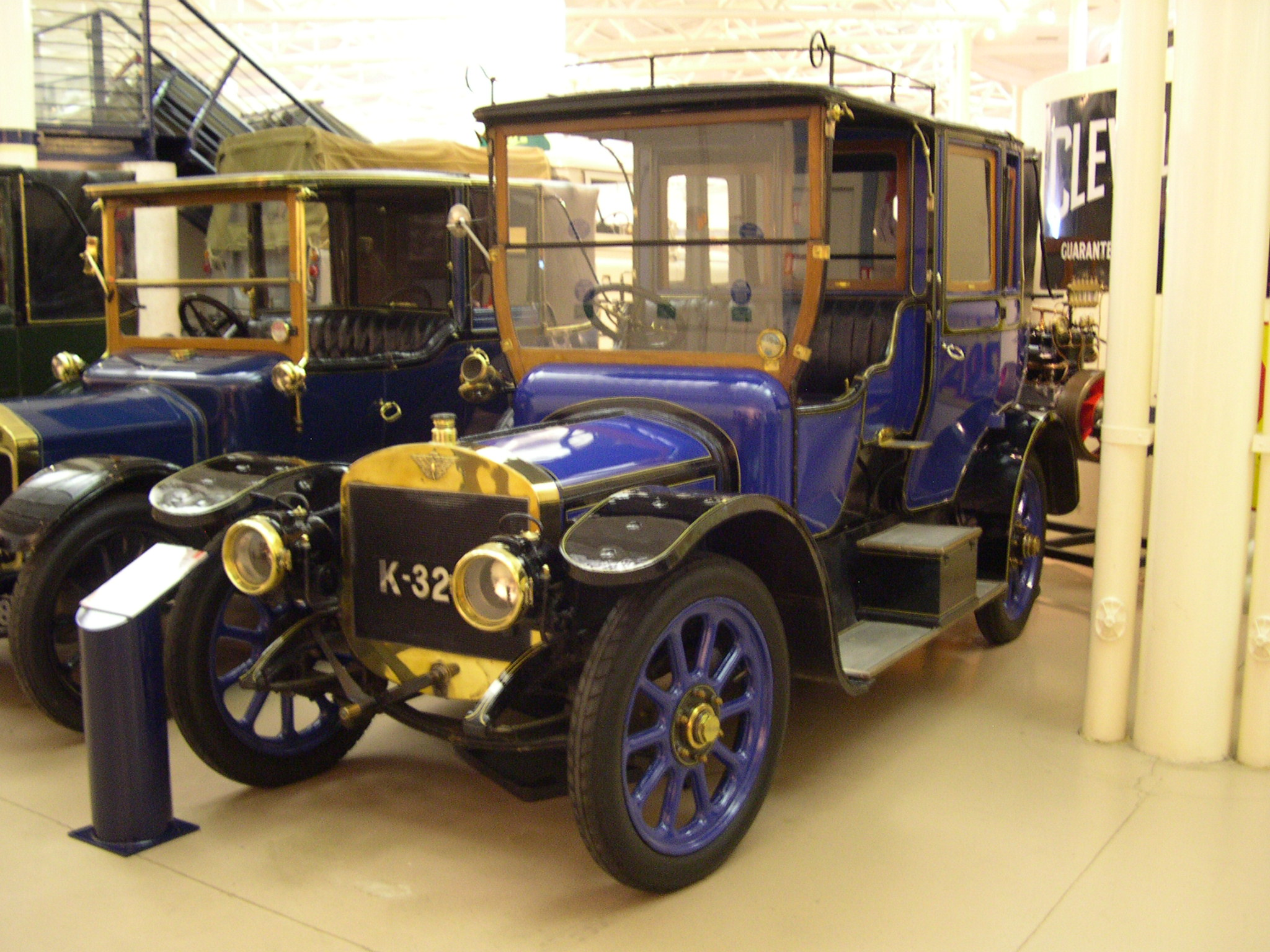
1907 York landaulette at Gaydon car 62, engine 61

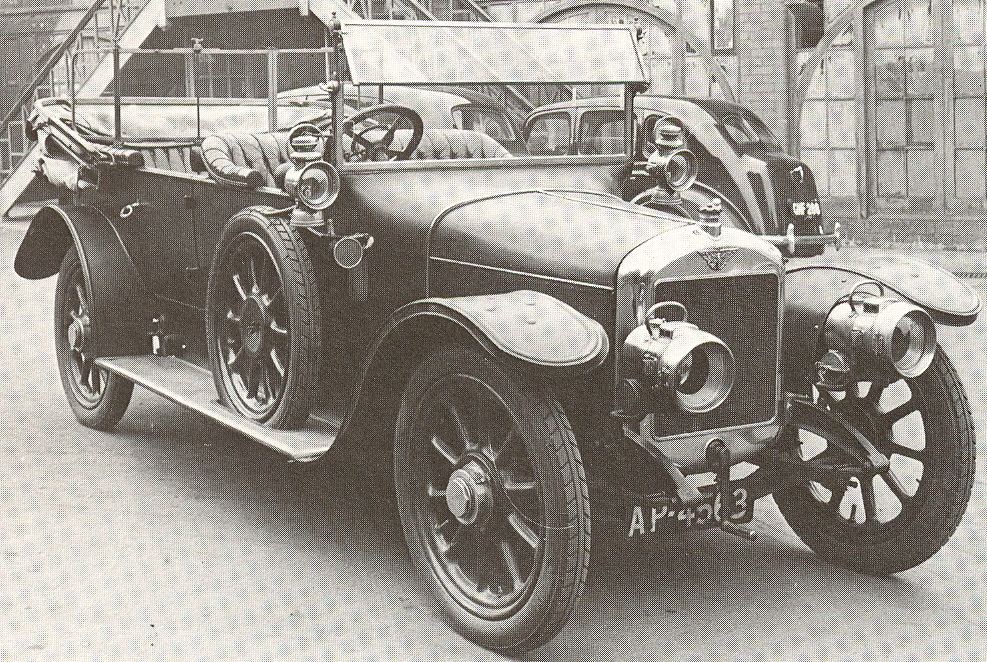
1912 Vitesse (Speedily)

The Austin 40 hp is a 4-cylinder motor car launched at the Olympia Motor Show in November 1907. Manufactured by Austin at Longbridge, Northfield, Birmingham, it was the first variant from Austin's initial plans for a two model range of a 15 hp (RAC 27 hp)—which they had dropped—and a 25 hp (RAC 33 hp) car.

Tax rating was still new and manufacturers preferred their own output estimates.

== Austin 40 ==
=== Engine ===
The 4-cylinder engine had a slightly larger cylinder bore than the superseded 25-30, giving an RAC rating of 36.3 hp from 5842 cc (32.8 hp, 5278 cc). It took 25-30's place in the catalogue. The engine's crankshaft runs in no fewer than five bearings. Power was transmitted to the live rear axle through a multiple-disc clutch with phosphor bronze and steel friction surfaces and a gearbox with sliding spur-wheel gears, providing four forward speeds and reverse, using a shaft fitted with two universal joints. The gearbox, of unusually strong design including an extra bearing on the inner end of the engine driven shaft, is operated on the gate principle. Unusually by 1907 the engine was fitted with a governor mounted on the fan spindle operating on the car's throttle. The Krebs carburetor initially fitted was replaced by an Austin design. Cooling water was circulated by a centrifugal pump, oil by a skew-gear driven vane-pump. An oil pressure gauge is fitted.

=== Chassis ===
The chassis frame has an underframe designed to make a unit of the engine and gearbox both of which are supported by it along the full length of both their sides. Suspension is by semi-elliptic springs all round. At the rear universal-jointed radius rods tie the rear-axle casing to the chassis frame. A triangular torque rod held at its front end by a spring buffer resists the reaction of driving and braking. Internal expanding brakes are fitted to the rear wheels together with an external hinged shoe brake behind the gear box.

"One of the special features of this car is the new type of wind screen in front of the driver, which permits it being opened, and protecting the driver in wet weather, whilst giving a clear view ahead."

The engine capacity was increased for 1912 to 6236 cc (38.75 hp RAC rating).

On sale between 1907 and 1913 only 152 cars were produced.

=== Black Maria ===
At Olympia's 1909 Motor Show "the most striking object on the stand of the Austin Motor Company" was a 40-hp motor caravan inviting an immediate comparison with "the woeful vehicle vulgarly known as a Black Maria". However it was fitted up with a telephone installation, lavatory, linen lockers, etc and on show with a dinner table laid for six. A kitchen was in a separate compartment at the back. Internal sleeping accommodation was provided for two and attendants could camp out under canvas in bunks over the roof of the driver's seat. The 7-hp, 15 and 18/24 models were also displayed.

=== Defiance ===
Defiance, a fast touring car on the 40 hp chassis was exhibited at Olympia's 1912 Motor Show. It is delivered ready for the road with hood, screen, Austin-Sankey detachable wheels, dynamo and lamps. The CAV dynamo projects through the aluminium dashboard from its mounting on an aluminium bridge over the flywheel. It is driven by a counter shaft taking its drive from the camshaft. The Automotor Journal described Defiance as having a Torpedo body.

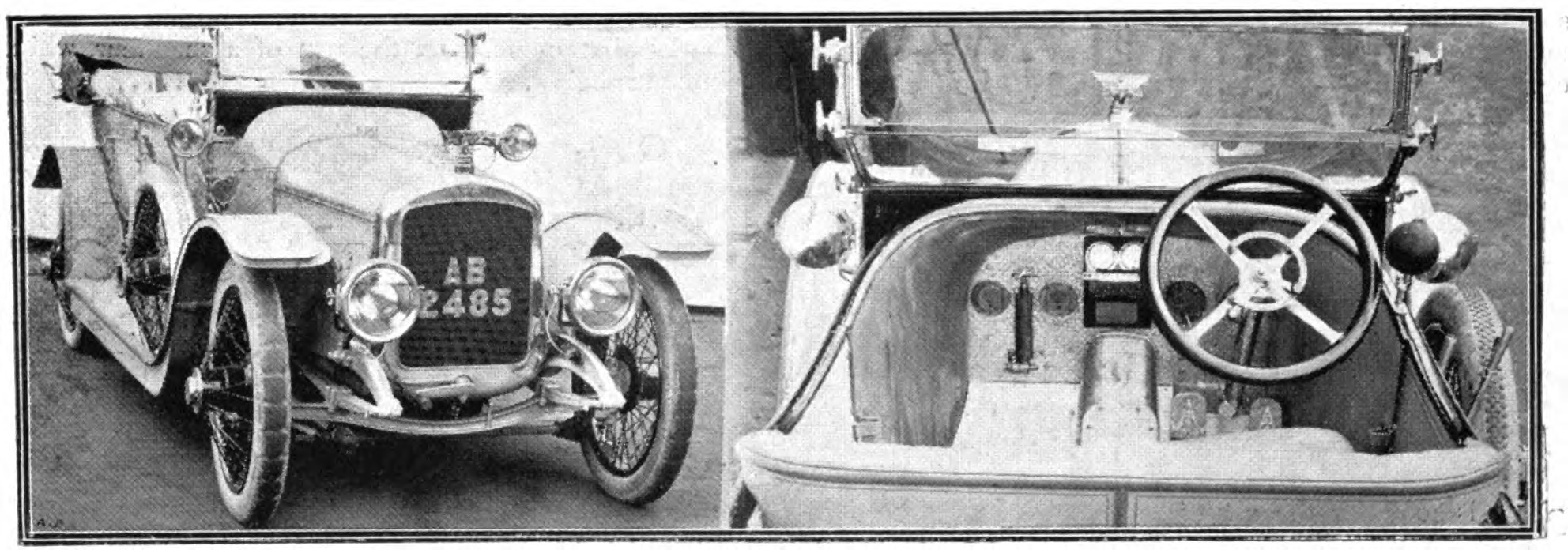

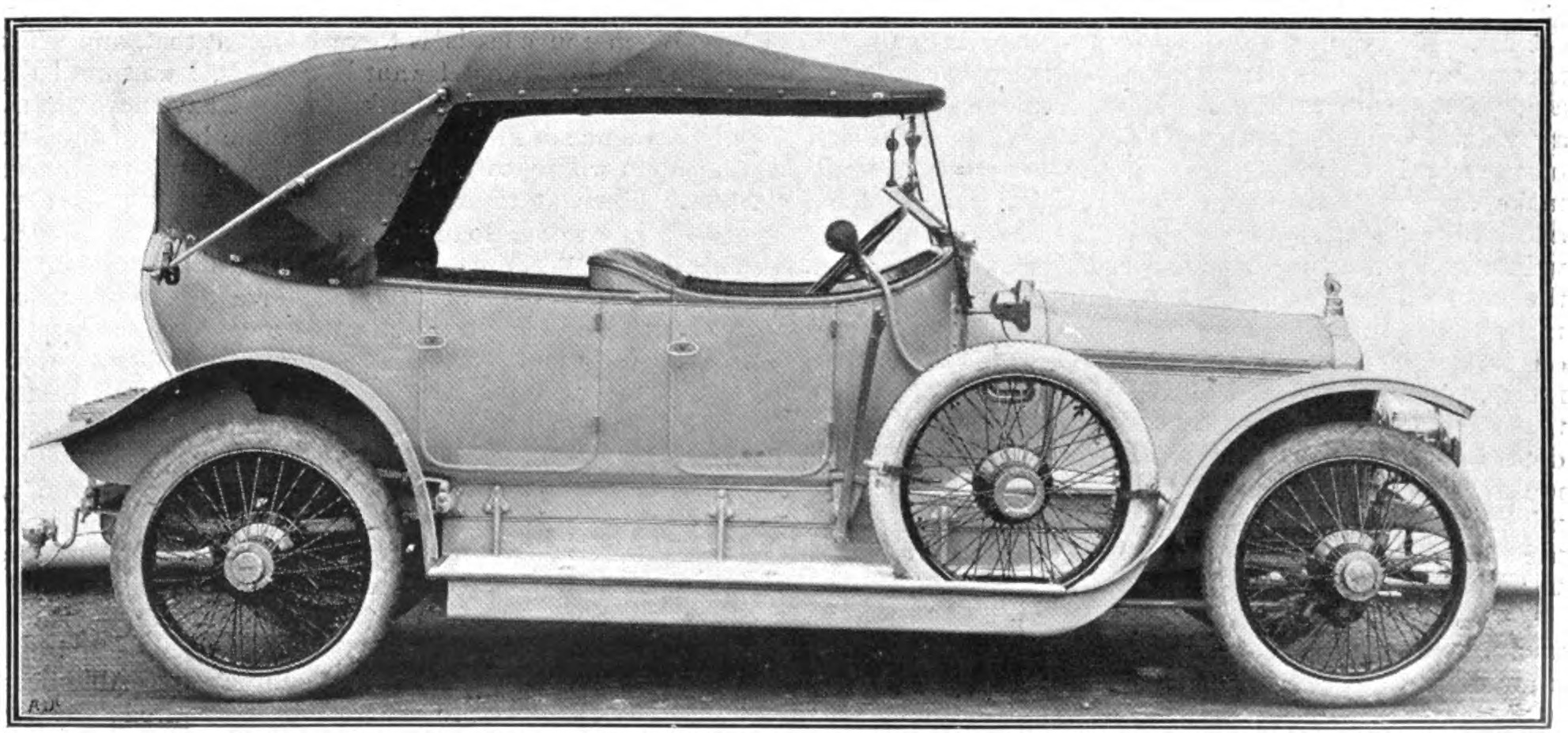

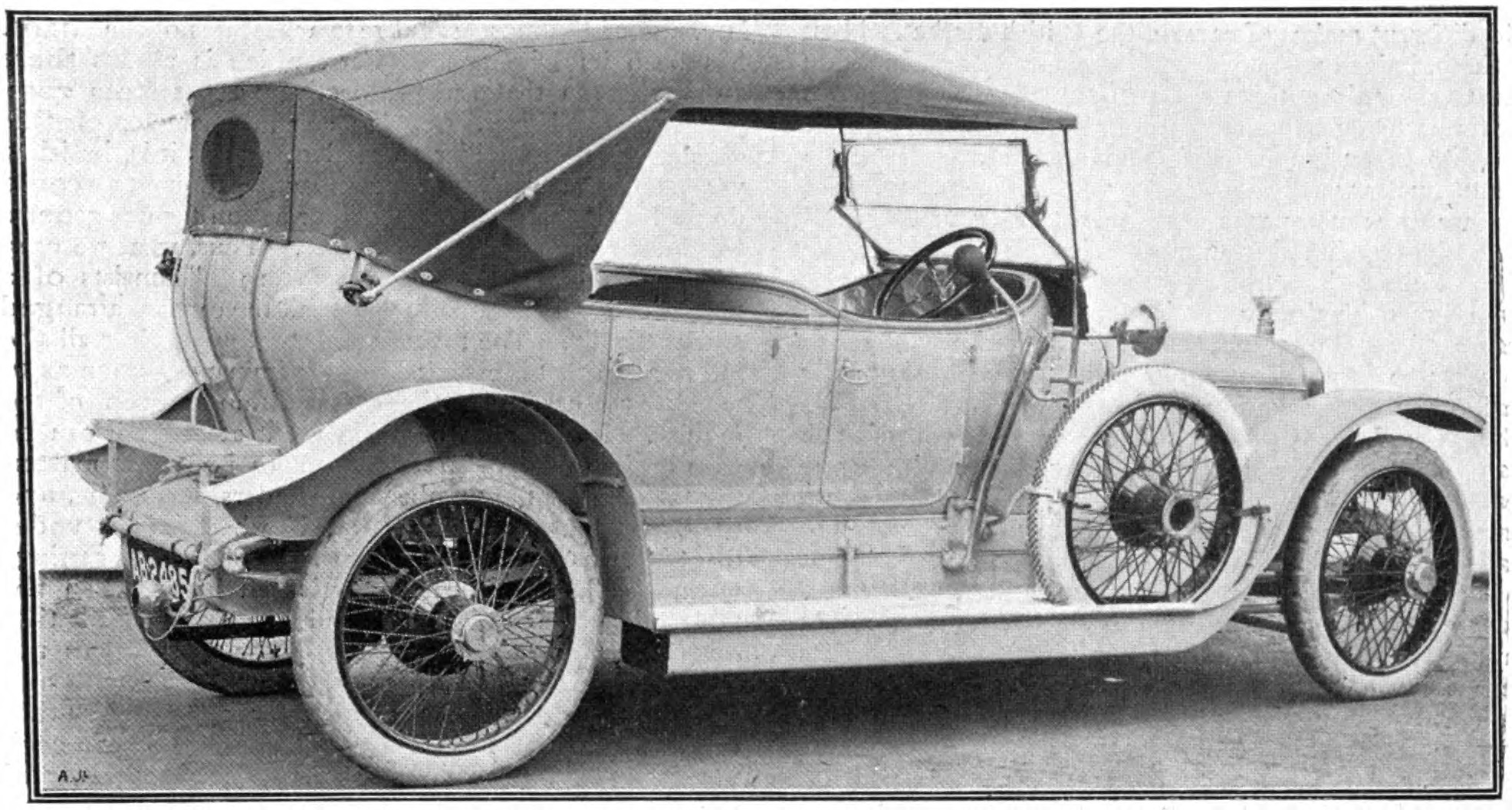

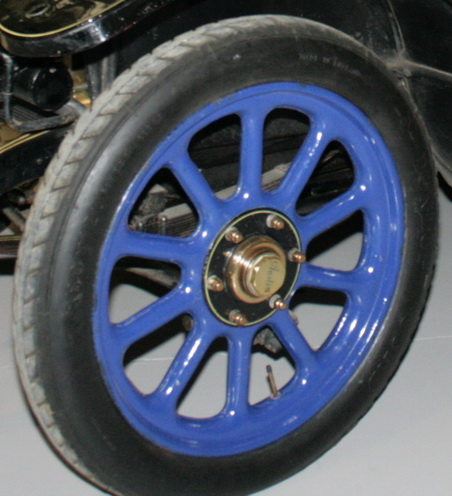
Austin-Sankey detachable wheel

Defiance had been developed from the 40 hp for the 2,000 mile trial held by the Automobile Club of Russia and run from St Petersburg to Riga and Moscow. It was given a streamlined body, a tapered bonnet and a radiator with rounded edges. It performed well. At St Petersburg over the flying kilometre carrying three people, two spare wheels, spare parts and luggage it was timed at 28 seconds, more than 80 miles an hour.

== Austin 60 ==
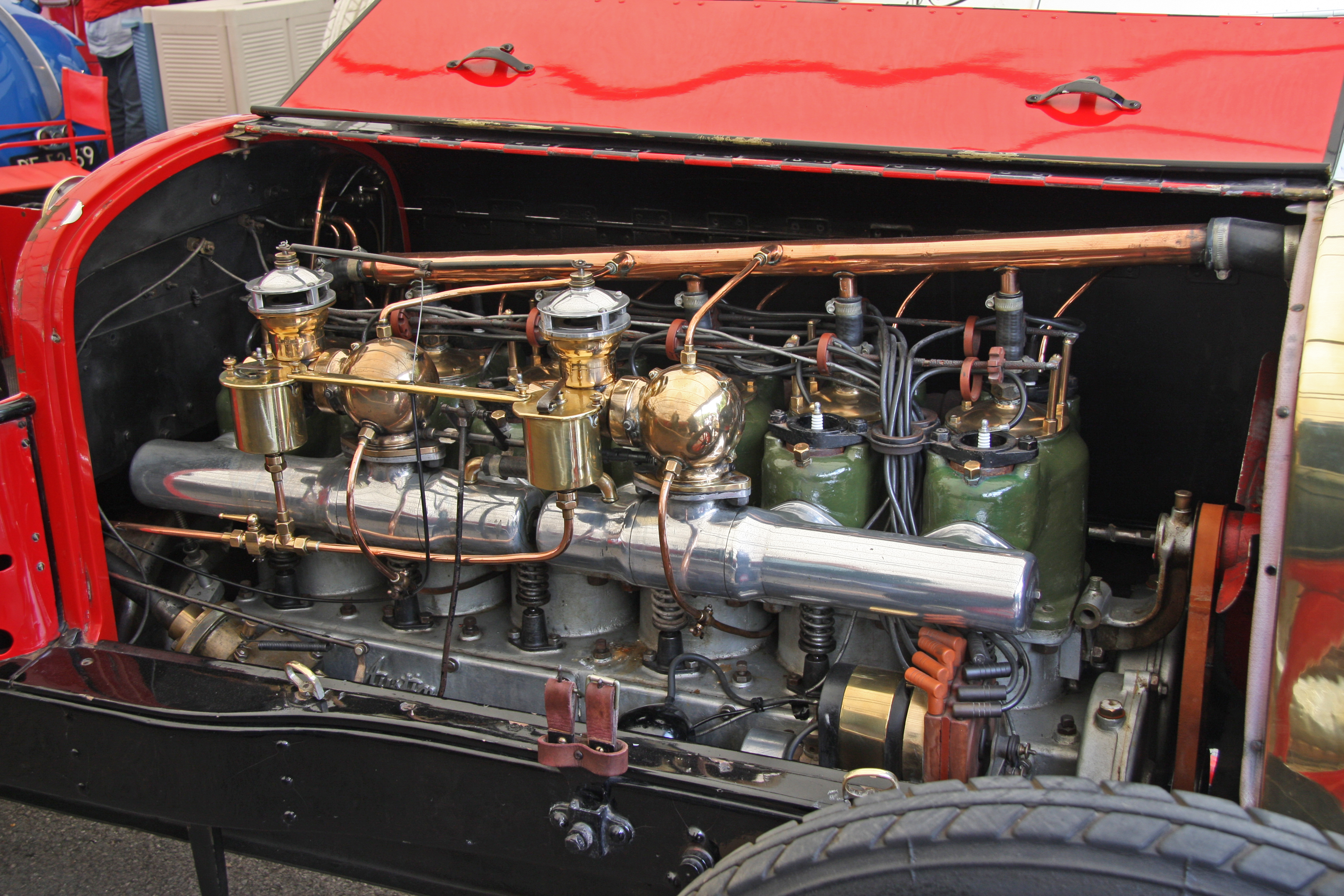
9.7-litre racing engine 1908 a development of the production 60 hp

The 6-cylinder Austin 60 hp was first displayed to the public at the Olympia Motor Show in November 1907. The display chassis was fitted with a Longbridge limousine body. The 8.762-litre six-cylinder 54.5 hp (RAC rating) engine shared the design and cylinder dimensions of Austin's 4-cylinder 40 hp car it just had two more cylinders.

The entire chassis was British built except for the Simms-Bosch high tension magneto which was twinned for the 60 hp car. Its second magneto, a little smaller, ran slightly ahead of the main magneto kicking in at high speed for more accurate firing. Overall the chassis design was usual Austin practice closely following the 40 hp car except that the 60 hp had direct drive on third speed, the other Austin cars having direct drive on top gear.

Around 14 Austin 60 hp cars were made.

British Gladiator

This car was also rebadged and sold as the 60 hp British Gladiator along with sister product the 18-24 British Gladiator. These British Gladiator cars were fitted with chain-drive in place of Austin's shaft-drive. They supplemented the French-made 14-18, 18-28 25-35 and 35-45 Gladiators.

== Austin 50 ==
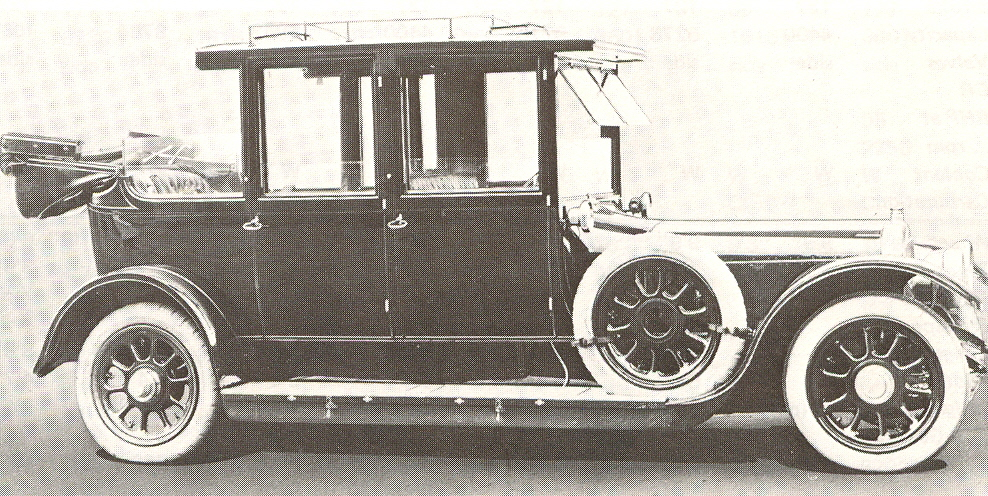
1911 50 Pullman limousine

The 60 hp was replaced for 1910 by a 6.6-litre 41 hp RAC rating car named Austin 50 hp.
