= Racicot =

Racicot is a surname of French origin. People with that name include:

- André Racicot (born 1969), Canadian ice hockey player
- Ernest Racicot (1835–1909), Canadian politician
- Isabelle Racicot (born 1972), Canadian television host
- Marc Racicot (born 1948), American politician
- Pierre Racicot (born 1967), Canadian ice hockey official
- Richard Racicot, Canadian set decorator
- Zotique Racicot (1845–1915), Canadian priest
