= St Paul's Church, Peel =

Church in Greater Manchester, England

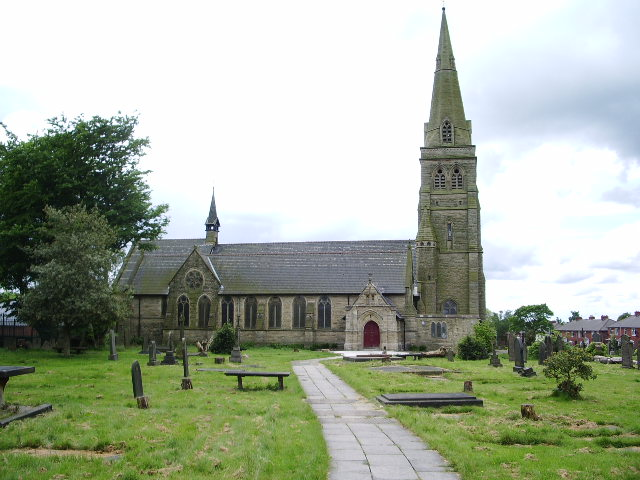
- The church from the north
- St Paul's Church, Peel
- 53.5309°N 2.4260°W
- OS grid reference: SD 71862 03895
- Location: Manchester Road, Little Hulton, Greater Manchester
- Country: England
- Denomination: Anglican

History
- Status: Parish church
- Dedication: St Paul
- Consecrated: December 1876

Architecture
- Functional status: Active
- Heritage designation: Grade II
- Designated: 29 July 1966
- Architect(s): J. Medland and Henry Taylor
- Architectural type: Church
- Style: Gothic Revival
- Groundbreaking: 1874
- Completed: 1876
- Construction cost: Church c. £5,000; Spire £2,000

Specifications
- Materials: Sandstone

Administration
- Province: York
- Diocese: Manchester
- Archdeaconry: Salford
- Deanery: Eccles
- Parish: Peel and Little Hulton

St Paul's Church, Peel is an active Anglican parish church in Little Hulton, Greater Manchester, England. It is part of the Diocese of Manchester and is a Grade II listed building. St Paul's serves the parish of Peel and Little Hulton and, together with St Paul's in Walkden and St John the Baptist in Little Hulton, is part of the Walkden and Little Hulton Team Ministry in the Eccles Deanery and Salford Archdeaconry.

== History ==
The church's origins are in Peel Chapel built in 1760 by the Yates family and consecrated as a chapelry in the Parish of Deane. The chapelry became a district parish in March 1874. The old chapel was demolished and the foundation stone for a new church immediately to the south was laid by Lord Kenyon in August 1874. The church, designed by J. Medland and Henry Taylor, was built between 1874 and 1876, consecrated in December 1876 and its tower added in 1897. Construction of the church cost about £5,500 (£400,000 in 2014), and the spire a further £2,000 (£160,000 in 2014).

== Architecture ==
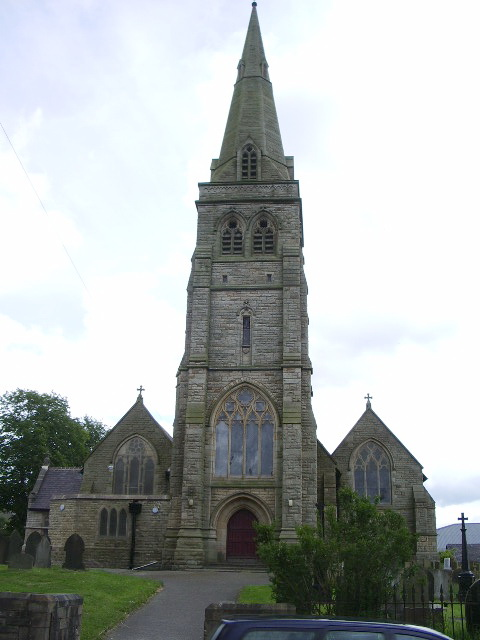
St Paul, Peel, west end

=== Exterior ===
The church is constructed in local sandstone from Peel Quarry with a slate roof and bellcote. The church has a north porch and west spire. It is in the Early English Gothic style with Decorated details.

The church is built on projecting plinths and has a nave and four-bay aisles with separate roofs which terminate short of the nave at the west. The bays, are separated by buttresses and each has a pair of two-light windows above a continuous sill band. The two-bay chancel is higher than the nave and has a five-light east window. The four-stage west tower has angled buttresses and a west door above which is a four-light west window. The belfry has paired two-light openings under a broach spire set back behind a parapet. The spire is 165 feet (50 m) tall.

=== Interior ===
The nave arcade is carried on short cylindrical columns with moulded and decorated capitals. It has a hammer-beam roof and the wide chancel arch is supported on quatrefoil columns. The columns are made of Runcorn and Bath stone. The chancel rail incorporates the pulpit made of gypsum or alabaster with green Connemara marble pillars carved into scenes from the life of St. Paul and the lectern with carvings of foliage.

The church has a reredos made from alabaster thought to be from the Blue John mines in Derbyshire, timber pews and a baluster font from the old chapel. Some of the stained glass is by Shrigley and Hunt. There are several 18th and 19th-century wall plaques. A window imported from the old Peel Chapel, which was made of porcelain, painted and then baked, is located over the font.

=== Churchyard ===
The churchyard contains the war graves of two service personnel of the First World War and nine of the Second World War.

Near the church porch is the grave of the Roscoe family, including the head of the family James Roscoe, who operated several local coal mines and lived at Kenyon Peel Hall.

== See also ==
- List of churches in Greater Manchester
