= Zoticus =

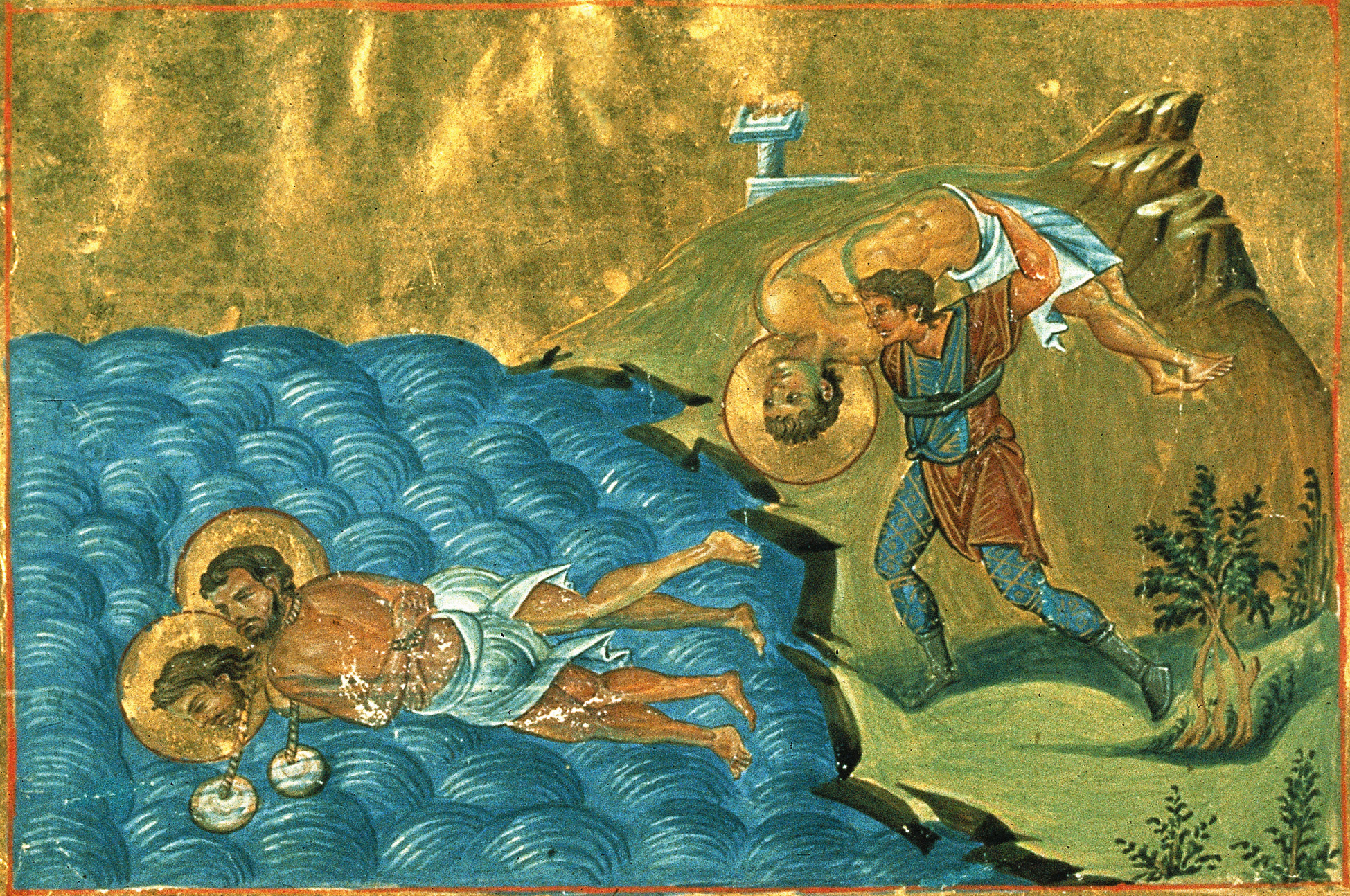
Holy Martyrs Dasius, Gaius, and Zoticus Constantinople, 985 AD. Miniature from the Menologion of Basil II

Zoticus may refer to:

== People ==
Zoticus is a Latin masculine given name of Greek origin (from Zotikos, meaning "full of life"). Its French form is Zotique. It may refer to:

- Zoticus of Comana (died 204), saint and bishop
- Aurelius Zoticus (fl. c. 220), athlete and lover of the Roman emperor Elagabalus
- Zoticus (3rd century), neo-Platonist philosopher
- Zoticus the Priest, of Constantinople, Guardian of Orphans, Hieromartyr (c. 340), Christian saint commemorated on 30 December
- Zoticus of Otrous (fl. 451–52), bishop
- Zoticus (praetorian prefect) (511–512), praetorian prefect of the East
- Paraspondylos Zotikos (15th century), poet and historian
- Zotique Racicot (1845–1915), Canadian bishop

== Other ==
- Zoticus, a genus of flies
