= Rosko (disambiguation) =

Rosko is a New York singer and music producer.

Rosko may also refer to:

- William (Rosko) Mercer, American disk jockey
- Rosko, Poland
- Emperor Rosko, US-born radio DJ best known for his time on Radio Caroline and BBC Radio 1
- Short form for the given name Rostislav

== See also ==
- Roscoe (disambiguation)
