= Little Hulton =

Area of Greater Manchester, England

Coordinates: 53.530°N 2.418°W

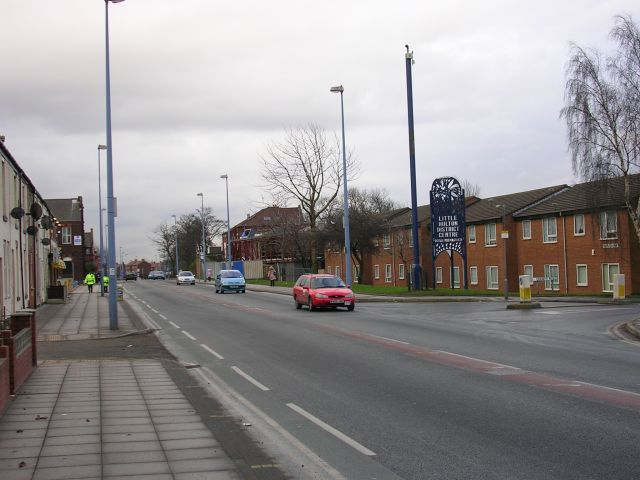
- Little Hulton (A6 road)

- Location within Greater Manchester
- Population: 13,469 Ward profile conducted by Salford City Council in 2014.
- OS grid reference: SD719037
  - London: 170 miles (274 km) SE
- Metropolitan borough: Salford
- Metropolitan county: Greater Manchester
- Region: North West
- Country: England
- Sovereign state: United Kingdom
- Post town: MANCHESTER
- Postcode district: M38
- Dialling code: 0161
- Police: Greater Manchester
- Fire: Greater Manchester
- Ambulance: North West
- UK Parliament: Bolton South and Walkden

Little Hulton is a suburb in the City of Salford, Greater Manchester, England, 3.4 miles (5.5 km) south of Bolton, 7 miles (11.3 km) northwest of Salford, and 9 miles (14.5 km) northwest of Manchester. Within the boundaries of the historic county of Lancashire, Little Hulton is bordered by Farnworth to the north, Walkden to the east and Tyldesley to the south.

In 2014, it had a population of 13,469.

== History ==
The earliest remains from Little Hulton were excavated between 2006–2008 by Oxford Archaeology when the remains of Mesolithic flints and a small pit filled with fire-cracked stones were discovered. In addition a later Bronze Age roundhouse 7 metres (23 ft) in diameter and several four post structures were found, dating to between 1480 BC and 1080 BC.

The ancient district of Hulton containing three townships, Over Hulton, Middle Hulton and Little Hulton, was recorded as Helghtun and Hulton in 1235, Hilton in 1278 and 1292, and Hulton in 1292, although Hilton was still used until the 17th century. Historically Little Hulton was a village in the ancient Deane parish, with a chapel sometimes called Peel Chapel. The chief manor was held by the Hultons at Hulton Park in Over Hulton.

Wharton was a subordinate manor that gave its name to the family living there. Later it was owned by the Asshetons of Great Lever and after that the Morts. It was sold to Bridgewater Collieries. Wharton Hall was a two-storey farmhouse built of brick, timber and plaster.

A medieval bloomery was discovered in 2006–2008 during work by Oxford Archaeology dating to between the 12th and 14th centuries. Five possible furnaces were discovered by excavation in addition to several structures and windbreaks.

In the 13th century Peel or Wicheves, another district in the township, was owned by the Hultons who sold it to the Tyldesleys. Later it was owned by Edmund Fleetwood of Rossall who sold it to the Morts. Joseph Yates of Manchester bought it in the 18th century and his descendants sold it to colliery owner, Ellis Fletcher of Clifton. Peel Hall was reputedly built in 1840 by Matthew Fletcher, from the designs of Sir Charles Barry. It stood on the site of an older stone-built hall which had a moat. Peel Hall became a sanatorium to treat tuberculosis and subsequently a geriatric hospital until it closed in 1990. It was sold to a development company for refurbishment but, despite being a Grade II listed building, was vandalised, became dangerous and was demolished in the mid-1990s. Parts of the property still remain including the ice house which is also a grade II listed building.

Kenyon Peel Hall, was owned by Alexander Rigby in 1600 and he gave it to his son George. It passed to Roger Kenyon of Parkhead through marriage. It was a large timber, stone and brick house which was built in the late 16th century and enlarged in 1617. The house was demolished and the site is occupied by a modern housing estate. Kenyon Peel Hall was about a 1/4 mile (0.40 km) south of the ancient highway from Manchester to Bolton.

The main settlement in the eastern part of the area was Wharton Hall. The remains of the hall were excavated in 2006–2008 by Oxford Archaeology and included some substantial remains of walls and footings of an early 17th-century building. Adam Mort acquired Wharton Hall in 1628 and then demolished and rebuilt it, most likely in the following year. Several other post-medieval farmsteads were also uncovered including Cinder Hill and Ashes Farm at Little Hulton, Oliver Fold and Guest Fold within the Cutacre area.

Coal mining and weaving were the major occupations in the mid 19th century.

In 1870 the London and North Western Railway opened a line from Roe Green on the Eccles, Tyldesley and Wigan Railway to serve collieries at Little Hulton and in 1874 an extension to Bolton was opened with passenger services commencing in 1875. The line closed in 1965, and is now an urban cycleway. A 10-foot (3.0 m) wide Roman road was found when the railway was being cut.

=== Coal mining and Cutacre ===
Little Hulton was extensively mined from the mid-19th century. Its collieries included Madam's Wood Pits, Brackley, Wharton Hall, Ashton's Field and Peel Hall and most were served by mineral railways. Mine spoil was deposited around the early collieries but in the 20th century the Cutacre tip developed in the valley of the Cutacre Clough and was the dumping ground for mine waste from Brackley and neighbouring Mosley Common Collieries.

The National Coal Board Central Workshops, commonly known as 'Walkden Yard', south of Walkden High Street, close to the Ellesmere Colliery, was partly in Little Hulton. The workshops were built in 1878 by the Bridgewater Collieries as a central works depot providing engineering services for its collieries and the locomotives used on its colliery railway system. It closed as a British Coal workshop in 1986 and is now the site of a housing estate.

UK Coal was granted planning permission to surface mine 900,000 tonnes of coal and rework the Cutacre spoil tip in 2001. The operation was expected to last for four years and began in 2006. The restoration scheme was expected to create more than 250 acres (100 ha) of amenity woodland and wetlands and an area for industrial development. UK Coal and Bolton Council promoted the Middle Hulton portion of Cutacre through the Local Development Framework process and identified it as a key strategic site for development. After operations finished in 2011, the site was restored and landscaped to create an industrial estate covering 212 acres (86 ha) and 580 acres (230 ha) of recreational land.

=== 20th century ===
Before 1949 Little Hulton was a village of around 8,000 people. The land was developed into council housing overspill estates by Worsley Urban District Council to accommodate residents moved there from post-war slum clearance areas. By the end of 1956 over a thousand families had moved to the overspill estate being built at Little Hulton and by 1962 3,060 houses had been built. Little Hulton aimed to create a suburb that would improve the standard of living and create private space, greenspace and a sense of community for the new residents.

The housing estate to the northwest, along the Wigan road, is known as Greenheys. Here the 1894 Ordnance Survey map shows only Greenhey's House and a few roadside houses.

== Governance ==
Historically in the hundred of Salford in Lancashire, until the 19th century, Little Hulton was a township and chapelry in the ecclesiastical parish of Deane. In 1837 Little Hulton along with neighbouring townships became part of the Bolton Poor Law Union which took responsibility for the administration and funding of the Poor Law in that area. In 1866 Little Hulton became a separate civil parish, in 1872 a Local board of health was established for the township, and in 1894 Little Hulton Urban District was created. On 1 April 1933 the district was abolished and merged into Worsley Urban District On 1 April 1974 the parish was abolished. In 1951 the parish had a population of 9997.

Since 1974 Little Hulton has been an electoral ward of the City of Salford. The Little Hulton ward has three elected councillors. In April 2017 the councillors are: Colette Weir, Kate Lewis, and Rob Sharpe, all from the Labour Party.

Little Hulton is in the Bolton South and Walkden parliamentary constituency. Since July 2024, its MP is Yasmin Qureshi of the Labour Party.

== Geography ==
Little Hulton is the most easterly of the Hulton townships, it covers an area of 1,707 acres (691 ha) rising from 200 feet (61 m) in the south east to 380 feet (120 m) in the north west. The main Manchester to Chorley road, the A6, crosses the town. Much of the area was pasture and meadow on good soil. Sandstone was quarried at Peel Quarry and the underlying rocks are the coal measures of the Manchester Coalfield.

== Demography ==
Population changes in Little Hulton

Year	Population	±%
1881	5,714	—
1891	6,693	+17.1%

Year	Population	±%
1901	7,294	+9.0%
1911	8,103	+11.1%

Year	Population	±%
1921	7,910	−2.4%
1931	7,874	−0.5%

Year	Population	±%
1951	9,997	+27.0%
2011	12,851	+28.5%

Sources: Little Hulton Ch/CP 1881–1951

== Education ==
School	Type	Ofsted	Website
Bridgewater Primary School	Primary school	105912	website
Dukesgate Primary School	Primary school	105920	website
Peel Hall Primary School	Primary school	105913	website
St Edmund's R.C. Primary School	Primary school	105958	website
Wharton Primary School	Primary school	105897	website

== Religion ==
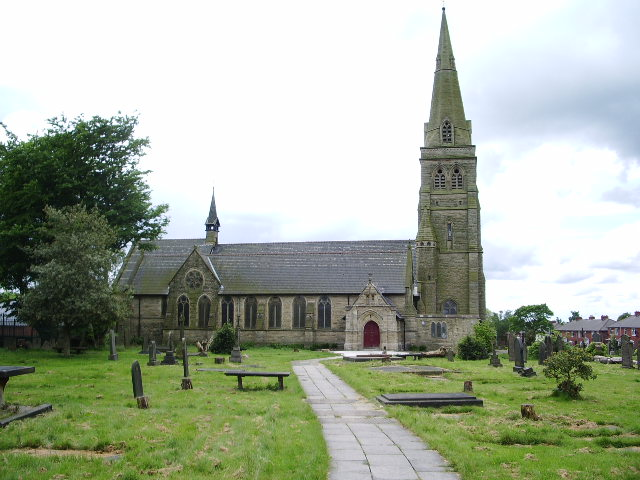
St Paul's Church, consecrated in December 1876

The old Wharton Chapel had its origins in the Act of Uniformity 1662 which led to the Great Ejection of clergy. Reverend James Wood (the elder) was ejected from Atherton Chapel but continued to hold services in private houses, including that of the Mort family at Wharton Hall. A Presbyterian church was rebuilt in 1723 and after 1755 used by different denominations until it was restored to the Presbyterians in 1860. A new church was built in 1901.

Peel Chapel, built by the Yates family, was consecrated in 1760. In 1874 Peel became a parish and the foundation stone for St Paul's Church was laid by Lord Kenyon. The church, built in sandstone from Peel Quarry, was consecrated in December 1876. Its spire was built in 1898 and is 165 feet (50 m) high. The church is a Grade II listed building. A window made of painted and fired porcelain over the font at St Paul's is from the old Peel Chapel.

The Roman Catholic parish of St Edmund's comprises St Edmund's Church built in 1899 and Our Lady and Lancashire Martyrs built in 1959. St Joseph's Church closed on 24 October 2010.

Several chapels were built for Methodist congregations including a Wesleyan Methodist church opened in 1878 at a cost of £700. Other places of worship include the Gospel Hall, a Redeemed Christian Church of God, a United Reformed Church and Kingdom Hall of Jehovah's Witnesses.

== Sport and organisations ==
Little Hulton Cricket and Bowling Club at the Old Vicarage is affiliated to the Bolton and District Cricket Association. Little Hulton Reds Amateur Rugby League Football Club is based at Peel Park.

The Air Cadet Organisation's 1099 (Worsley) Squadron, Air Training Corps meets at Highfield Road.

Little Hulton and Walkden Community Committee meets bi-monthly and works with Salford City Council and produces an annual action plan to improve the quality of life and provide activities. The library is on Longshaw Drive.

== Public services ==
Little Hulton is policed by the Greater Manchester Police force from Little Hulton Police Station. The statutory emergency fire and rescue service is provided by the Greater Manchester Fire and Rescue Service, from fire stations in Salford, Broughton, Agecroft in Pendlebury, Eccles and Irlam. Hospital services are provided by the Salford Royal NHS Foundation Trust, which provides an Accident and Emergency service at Salford Royal.

Waste management is co-ordinated by Greater Manchester Waste Disposal Authority. Little Hulton's Distribution Network Operator for electricity is Electricity North West. United Utilities manage Little Hulton's drinking and waste water.

== Notable people ==
- Christopher Eccleston, actor
- Jimmy Hampson, footballer
- George Maddison, footballer
- James Roscoe, locomotive engineer and colliery owner
- Paul Ryder, musician
- Shaun Ryder, musician

== See also ==
- Listed buildings in Worsley
