= James Roscoe =

James Roscoe may refer to:

- James Roscoe (diplomat) (born 1975 or 1976), British diplomat
- James Roscoe (engineer) (c. 1820–1890), English locomotive engineer

== See also ==
- James Rosco (died 1761), British actor
- James Roscoe Day (1845–1923), American pastor and university administrator
- James Roscoe Drummond or Roscoe Drummond (1902–1983), American journalist
