= James Roscoe (engineer) =

English locomotive engineer

- Born: c. 1820; England
- Died: 1 August 1890 (aged 69–70); England
- Occupations: Locomotive engineer, colliery owner

James Roscoe (c. 1820 – 1 August 1890) of Little Hulton, Lancashire, was an English locomotive engineer and colliery owner.

He was the son of Roger Roscoe of Farnworth and his wife Eliza Grundy. He started his working life as a miner in Astley before moving to Leicester to work in the locomotive department of the Midland Railway. During his time there (in 1862) he developed and patented an automatic locomotive lubricator known as a Roscoe type lubricator (British Patent 1337, US Patent 37245). The royalties from this device enable him to invest in coal mines in the Little Hulton area north of Manchester. He lived at nearby Kenyon Peel Hall (since demolished) with his wife Mary and several children.

During the late 1840s and early 1850s he sank the New Watergate and Peel Hall pits in Little Hulton, delivering the output by horse and cart prior to the arrival of the railway line in 1874. In 1872, in partnership with William Roscoe, he began the New Lester Pit at nearby Tyldesley. Management of the collieries was largely in the hands of his sons Thomas and George.

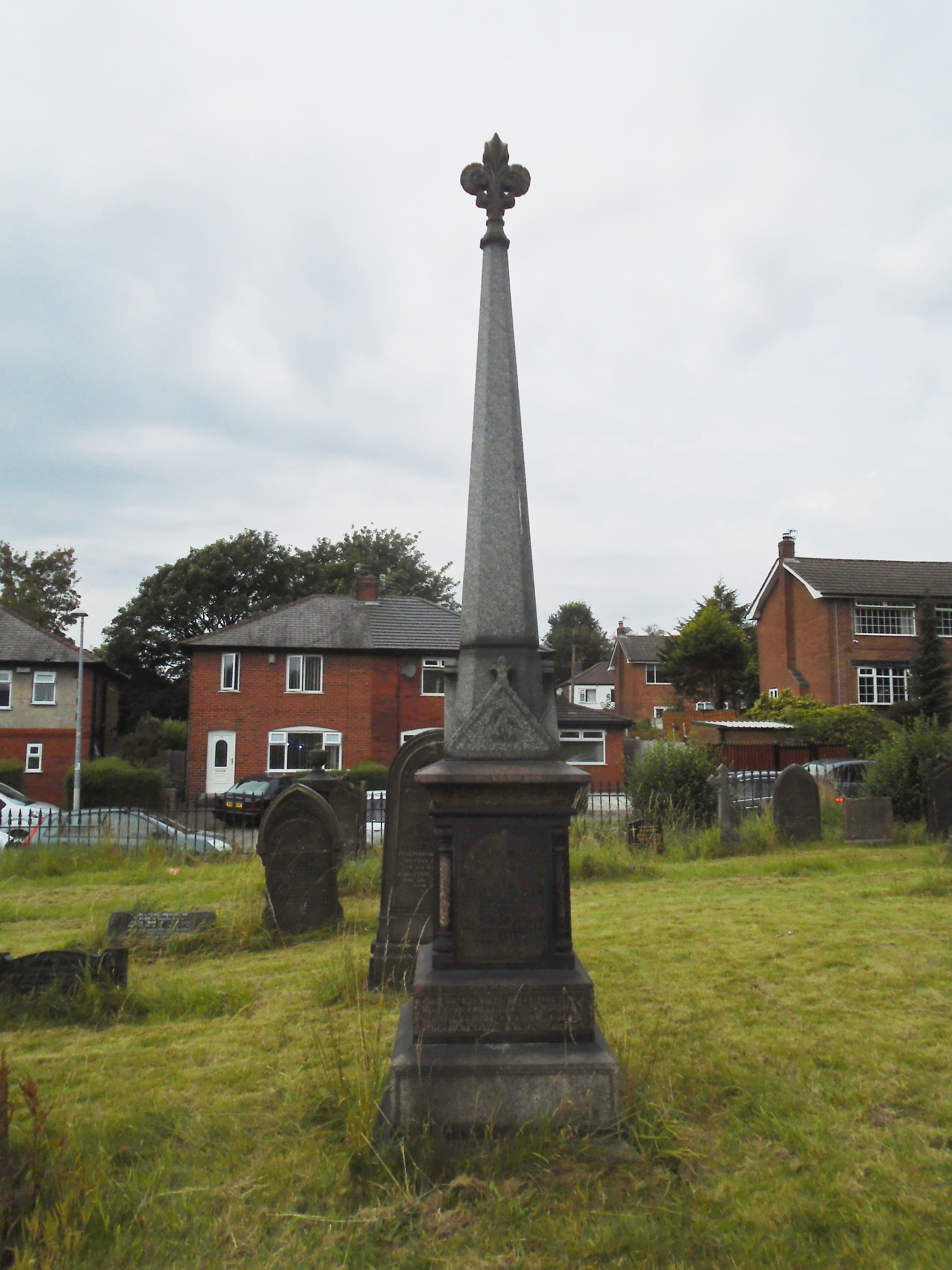
Roscoe family grave, St Paul's church, Peel, Little Hulton

His company of James Roscoe and Sons was formed in 1872 and continued until taken over by Peel Collieries in 1938. Roscoe himself died in 1890 at Kenyon Peel Hall and is buried at St Paul's Church, Peel. He had married Mary Bennet and left five sons and two daughters.
