= Roscoe Township =

Roscoe Township may refer to:

- Roscoe Township, Winnebago County, Illinois
- Roscoe Township, Davis County, Iowa
- Roscoe Township, Reno County, Kansas, in Reno County, Kansas
- Roscoe Township, Goodhue County, Minnesota
- Roscoe Township, St. Clair County, Missouri
- Roscoe Township, LaMoure County, North Dakota, in LaMoure County, North Dakota
