= Zotique Racicot =

- Auxiliary Bishop of Montreal, Quebec; Titular Bishop of Pogla
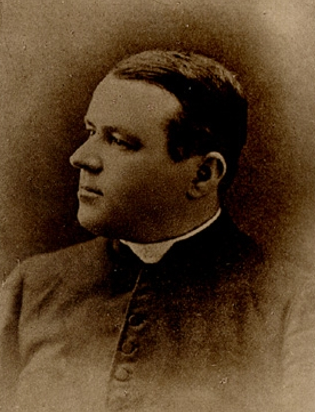
- Installed: January 14, 1905
- Term ended: September 14, 1915
- Predecessor: Emile Joseph Legal
- Successor: Reinaldo Muñoz Olave

Orders
- Ordination: November 6, 1870

Personal details
- Born: October 13, 1845 Sault-au-Récollet (Montreal North), Canada East
- Died: September 14, 1915 (aged 69) Sainte-Thérèse-de-Blainville (Sainte-Thérèse), Quebec

Zotique Racicot, baptized François-Théophile-Zotique, (October 13, 1845 – September 14, 1915) was a Canadian Roman Catholic priest and Auxiliary Bishop of Montreal from 1905 to 1915.

St. Zotique Street in Montreal was probably named in his honour. The name Zotique (Zoticus in Latin) is derived from the Greek adjective zotikos, meaning "of life".
