= Automatic lubricator =

Device fitted to a steam engine to supply lubricating oil

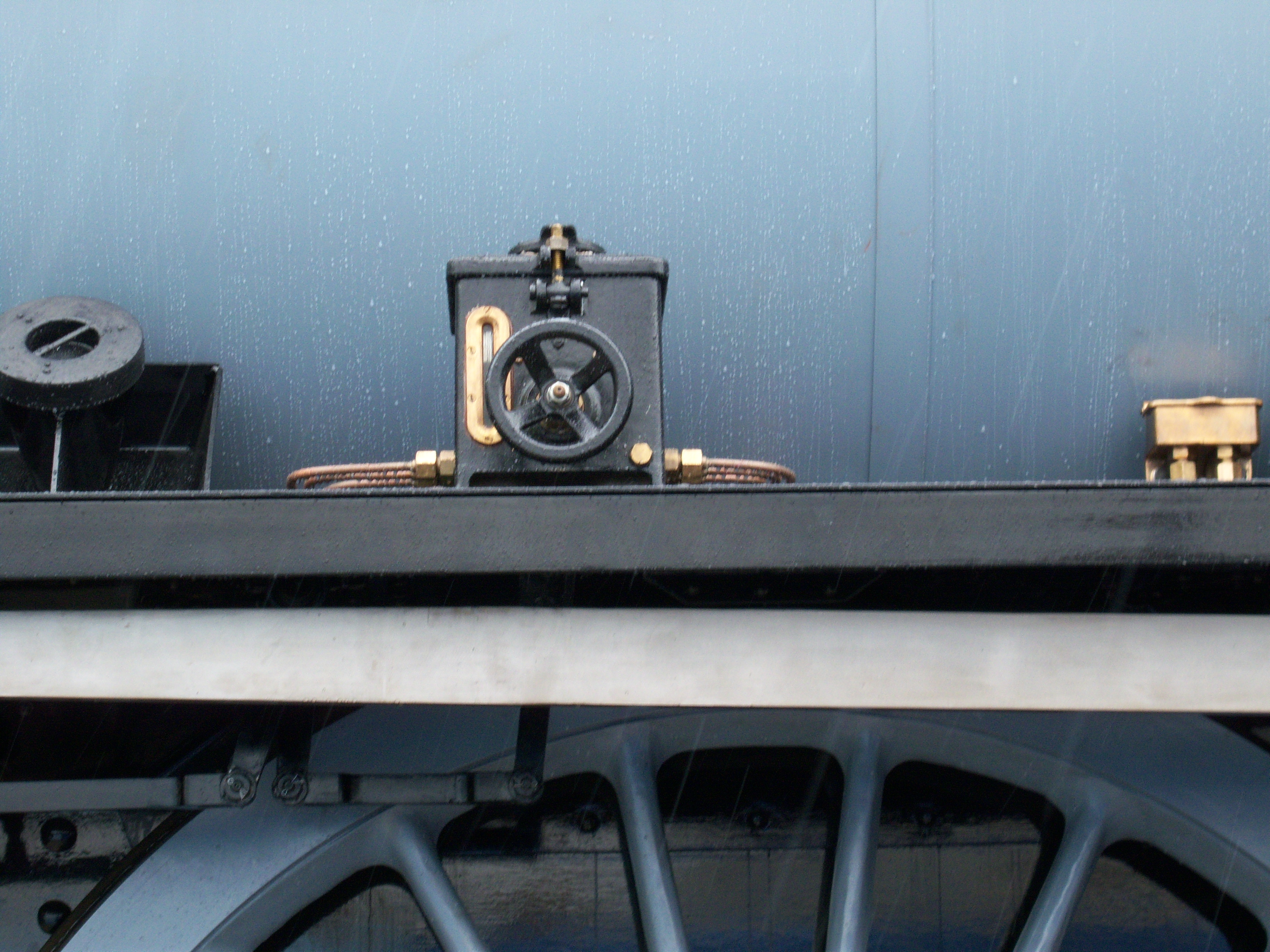
Modern locomotive lubricators. The center item is a mechanical lubricator for the cylinders, operated by the connecting lever seen below it (or by the hand wheel, for priming). The smaller one to the right is a § syphonic lubricator. The item on the left is not a lubricator, but the filler for the sandbox.

An automatic lubricator is a device fitted to a steam engine to supply lubricating oil to the cylinders and, sometimes, the bearings and axle box mountings as well. There are various types of automatic lubricator, which include various designs of displacement, hydrostatic and mechanical lubricators.

== Displacement lubricator ==
=== Ramsbottom type ===
The displacement lubricator was introduced in the United Kingdom in 1860 by John Ramsbottom. It operates by allowing steam to enter a closed vessel containing oil. After condensing, the water sinks to the bottom of the vessel, causing the oil to rise and overflow into delivery pipes. The oil from the delivery pipes is introduced into the steam pipe, where it is atomised and carried to the valves and cylinders.

In early applications in steam locomotives, either two displacement lubricators (one for each cylinder) would be positioned at the front of the boiler near the valves, often on either side of the smokebox or one lubricator would be placed behind the smokebox. The behind-smokebox configuration has the advantage that a good connection can be made to the steam pipe and it was used by the Great Western Railway. It has the disadvantage that the lubricator's accessibility is reduced and additional drain pipes are required to be connected to the waste to avoid it dripping onto the boiler.

The displacement lubricator was a useful stop-gap but had the disadvantage that it was difficult to accurately control over the rate of oil feed and lubrication was only supplied when the engine was doing work (when a locomotive is coasting with the regulator closed, no steam is present to operate the lubricator).

=== Roscoe type ===
The Roscoe type lubricator improved the situation by providing a valve with which to regulate the flow of steam and hence lubricant. Setting the valve correctly required experience and depended on the speed of the train.

The Roscoe lubricator was invented by James Roscoe in 1862 and patented in British Patent 1337. It incorporated two improvements over the original Ramsbottom type, the ability to control the quantity of steam which entered the lubricator, via a control valve, and the addition of an air filled chamber within the oil reservoir. The chamber expanded when steam was cut off, the aim of which was to supply oil even when the locomotive was coasting. However, this proved ineffective in practice, particularly if the locomotive was coasting for a long time (e.g. down a hill).

=== Elijah McCoy ===
Elijah McCoy, a Canadian who moved to Michigan and became a U.S. citizen, received a patent for his 'improvement in lubricators for steam-engines' in 1872. Piping delivered oil by gravity from a central reservoir to where it was required. Later types of lubricator (from around 1887), referred to as the "sight-feed" type, allowed a sight glass to be positioned in the cab where the rate of oil feed could be observed. In 1898 McCoy's further patent added a glass tube mounted below the reservoir so that the rate of delivery could be monitored, with a bypass pipe available in case the main feed was seen to be blocked.

=== Replacement ===
When more sophisticated lubricators, such as the Wakefield and Detroit types, were developed, displacement lubricators fell out of use but they are still used on model steam engines.

== Hydrostatic lubricator ==
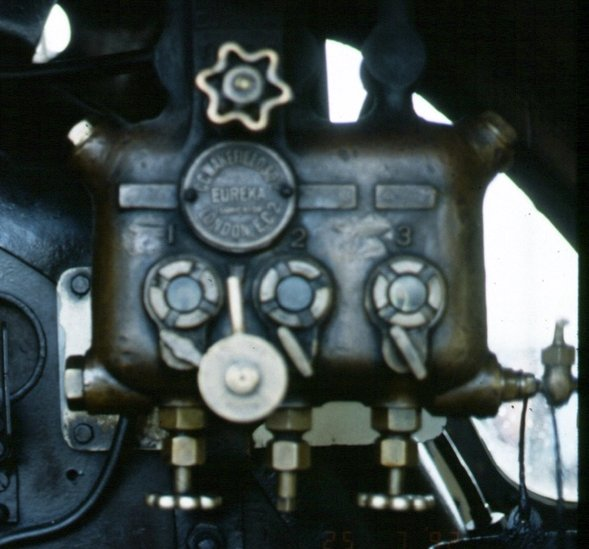
Hydrostatic lubricator showing sight glasses with oil drops rising through the water

The one-piece lubricator body is a gunmetal casting and incorporates the condensing chamber, the oil reservoir and the sight-glasses fitted at the front and back of the body. Passages within the body interconnect these areas. The body is fitted with a steam valve, a water valve and oil control valves. In operation, steam enters the condensing chamber and the condensed water passes into the bottom of the oil reservoir and the sight-glass chambers. When the sight-glass chambers have filled with water the oil delivery for each feed, regulated by control valves, is released upwards into the water-filled sight-glass chambers. The rate of delivery, typically two or three drops of oil through each feed per minute, is monitored by watching the progress of the drops as they rise through the water. The oil gathers above the water and passes into the delivery tubes. The body is fitted with a drain for emptying the condensed water from the oil chamber before it is refilled with oil.

This type of hydrostatic displacement lubricator was made by the Detroit Lubricator Company of the USA. A British patent was granted in 1911 and this lubricator was then manufactured by the Vacuum Oil Company (later Mobil Oil) as the British Detroit Lubricator. This lubricator was commonly made with either 3,4 or 5 feeds, the center feed on the odd numbered lubricators was often used for supplying oil to the steam end of Westinghouse air compressors.

== Wakefield lubricator ==
The Wakefield Oil Company, a manufacturer of lubricating oils, was founded in London by Charles Wakefield in 1899. The company manufactured both hydrostatic and mechanical lubricators but it was best-known for its patent mechanical lubricator. Marketed as the Wakefield Lubricator it comprised a large oil chest (typically 1 imperial gallon (4.5 L; 1.2 US gal) for eight delivery tubes) with eccentric-operated pumps submerged within it. Regulation of the oil feed was achieved by adjustment of sleeve valves, which could be made to release oil back into the reservoir (instead of entering the feed tubes) at varying stages as the delivery stroke progressed. If the device were used to deliver heavy grade oil to the steam cylinders the reservoir was heated by a steam coil to allow the oil to pass more easily down the delivery tubes.

== Silvertown mechanical lubricator ==
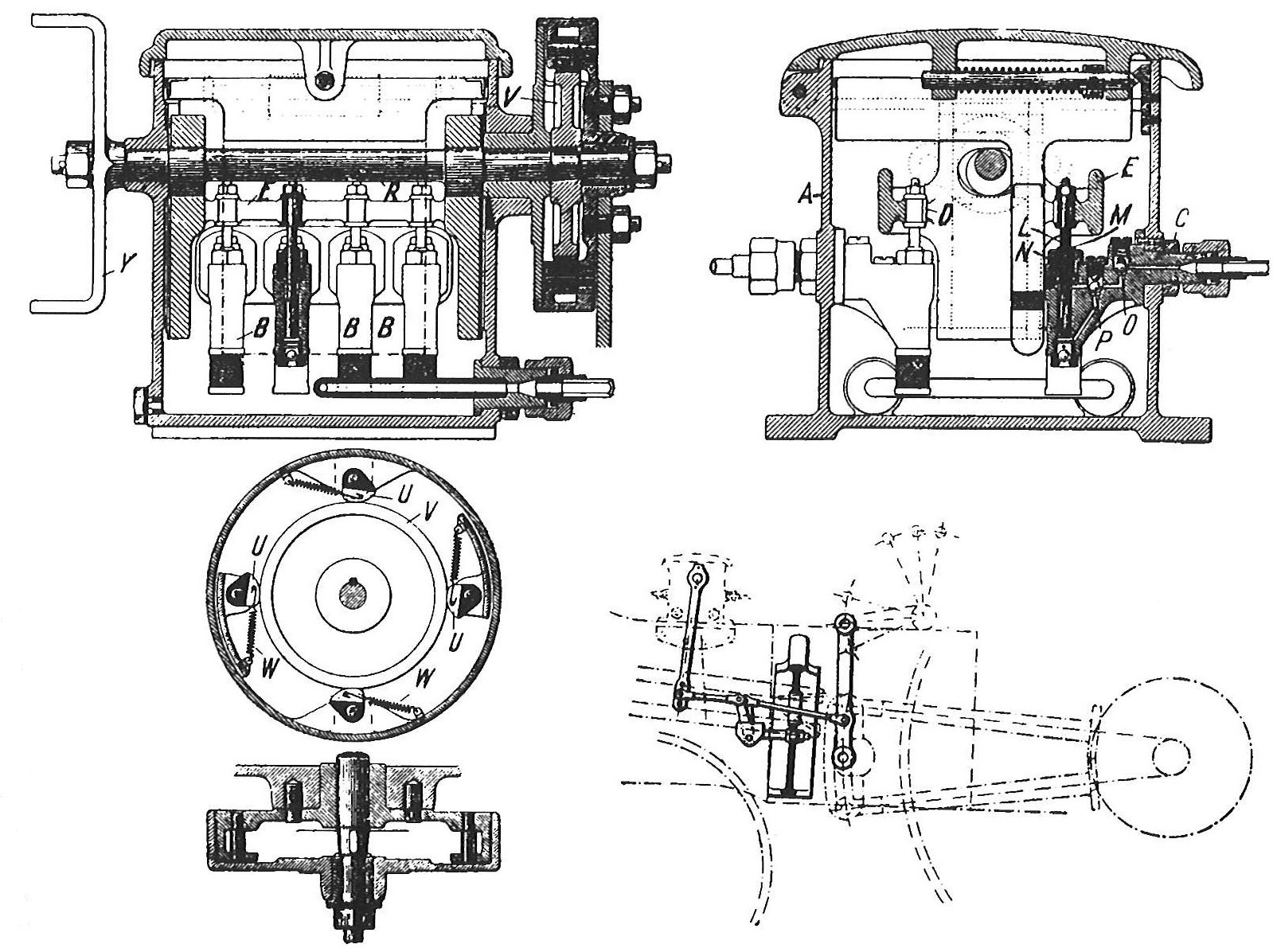
Patent drawing of the original Midland Railway version of the Silverton mechanical lubricator as reproduced in the December 1911 issue of 'The Engineer' magazine.

The Silvertown lubricator was designed and developed by the Midland Railway in 1911 and from 1922 was commercially available from Gresham and Craven. This style of mechanical lubricator was used by the London, Midland and Scottish Railway and latter by British Rail, as well as by the various UK private locomotive builders for export overseas. Commonly 2 lubricators were fitted, one for lubricating the cylinders and the second for lubricating the axleboxes.

The lubricator is a self-contained unit with the drive mechanism fitted at one end, with the drive shaft running through the cast iron oil reservoir. The drive shaft is fitted with 2 hardened steel eccentrics which provide movement to the drive frame which runs in machined grooves in the oil reservoir. This drive frame reciprocates vertically which then drives the double acting independent oil pumps located in the oil reservoir.

The lubricator is driven by a rod from the expansion link in locomotives valve gear. The rocking motion of this drive is converted to a rotary motion by a series of driving pawls contained in a clutch box. The lubricators were also fitted with a priming hand wheel on the outer face of the lubricator.

== Friedmann/Nathan mechanical lubricator ==
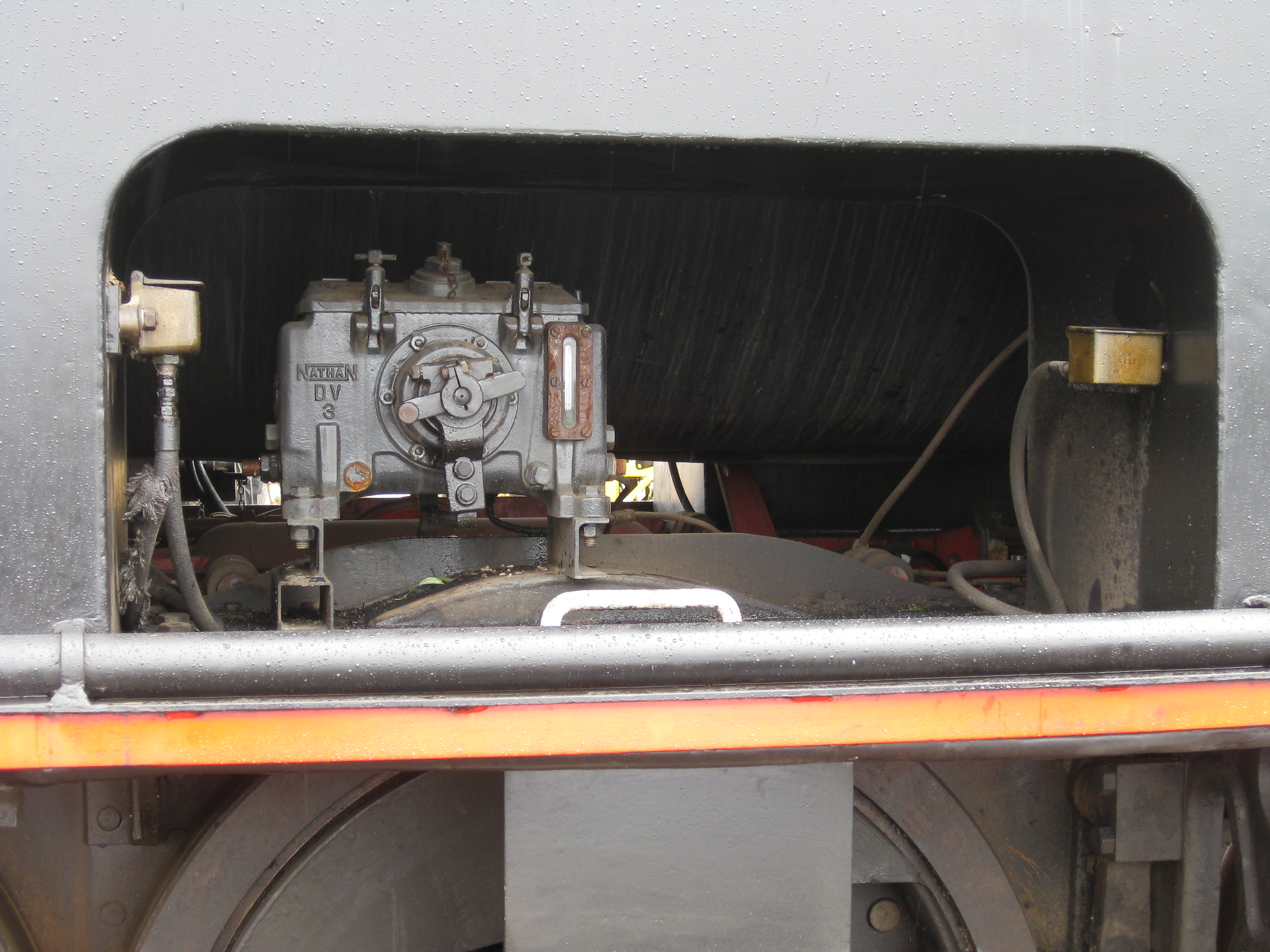
Nathan mechanical lubricator fitted to South Maitland Railway ten class loco No.18 in preservation.

The Friedmann system of mechanical lubricators included the DV & FSA type lubricators. This style of mechanical lubricator was designed & produced by Alex Friedmann KG of Austria. The DV type were then made under licence by in the US by the Nathan Manufacturing Co. & the type DV & FSA types in the UK by Davies & Metcalfe Ltd.

Both types of lubricator are of the 'valveless' type, having no ball valves, springs or oil seals used in the operation of the pump units.

The DV range was available in range of sizes with capacities ranging from 8 to 36 pints, and the number of feeds from 1 to 26. Each of the lubricators consist of a reservoir, a ratchet assembly, a sliding shaft assembly, and the pump units. A screwed oil filler cap is fitted to the lockable hinged lid of the reservoir and a sight glass for indicating the oil level is fitted to the front face of the reservoir. The pumps of the DV type lubricator are operated by a sliding shaft assembly, unlike the Silverton or Wakefield lubricators which are operated by a rotating camshaft.

The FSA type lubricator differs by each pump having two separate pistons to control the pumping & distribution of oil. The pistons are driven by cams on the driving shaft. The driving shaft is driven via a means of a roller ratchet assembly which converts the reciprocating motion of the operating linkage to rotary motion.

== Wick feed lubricator ==
Known also as syphon lubrication, equipment using this method consists of reservoirs of oil with delivery pipes from the reservoir to the bearings, axleboxes, slide bars or horn blocks, mounted so that the open top ends of the pipes are above the maximum oil level. Assemblies called trimmings—bundles of worsted yarn tied around narrow wire frames—are tucked into the open ends of the delivery pipes so that a "tail" of threads drapes into the oil. Capillary action draws the oil over the lip of the pipe for delivery by gravity. Variation in delivery rates comes from adjusting the size and tightness of the worsted bundles. The bundles of wool are effective in filtering out harmful contamination but do not work properly should water enter the reservoir.

== See also ==
- Splash lubrication
- Automatic lubrication system
