= Worsley Wardley Grammar School =

Location
- Mardale Avenue; Wardley, Swinton, Greater Manchester, M27 3QP (then 9SQ); England; 53.52041°N 2.35897°W

Information
- Type: Grammar school
- Established: 1955
- Closed: 1973
- Local authority: Lancashire
- Gender: Co-educational
- Age: 11 to 18
- Enrolment: 500-900 pupils
- Destiny: Became Wardley High School then part of Salford College

Worsley Wardley Grammar School was a secondary school in Wardley, Greater Manchester serving Walkden, Worsley, Swinton, Pendlebury, Wardley and Clifton.

== History ==
It opened as Worsley Wardley County Grammar School in September 1955 with just 69 boys and girls, rising to 500 by 1959, 650 in 1960, 750 in 1961, 800 in 1963 and 900 in 1965. It was run by the Lancashire Education Committee. Wardley Hall was nearby on the other side of the A6.

The school was located for the majority of its life in Mardale Avenue (off Ash Drive), Wardley, a locality west of Swinton, in the county of Lancashire - later Greater Manchester, in the parish of All Saints', Wardley. It was situated just north of Manchester Road (A6) in Wardley and just east (next to) of the M61/M60 junction (junction 15 of the current M60) - the Worsley Braided Interchange.

=== Comprehensive ===
In September 1972 it became a five form comprehensive school for ages 11–16, the Worsley Wardley High School with around 600 boys and girls in 1973 and 800 in 1978. After 1974, it was administered by the City of Salford. In September 1988, the Wardley High School and Pendlebury High School merged to become The Swinton High School, an 11-16 comprehensive.

Four members of the Happy Mondays went to this school. The other two went to the St Ambrose Barlow RC High School.

=== Further education college ===
It became the Wardley Campus of Salford College by the 1990s. Salford College became Salford City College in January 2009.

The Mardale Avenue building is now demolished, with St. Ambrose Barlow Roman Catholic High School occupying the old school grounds. Wardley Grange Farm is next to the school site.

== Notable former pupils ==
- Hazel Blears, Labour MP for Salford since 1997
- George Costigan, actor known for playing Bob in Rita, Sue and Bob Too
- Fiona Hall Lib Dem MEP for North East England since 2004
- Ian Seddon, footballer

=== Wardley High School ===
- Bez from the Happy Mondays
- Paul Davis, keyboard player of the Happy Mondays
- Gary Whelan, drummer from the Happy Mondays
- Andy Hayhurst (cricketer)
