= Hazel Blears =

British Labour politician (born 1956)

The Right Honourable Hazel Blears
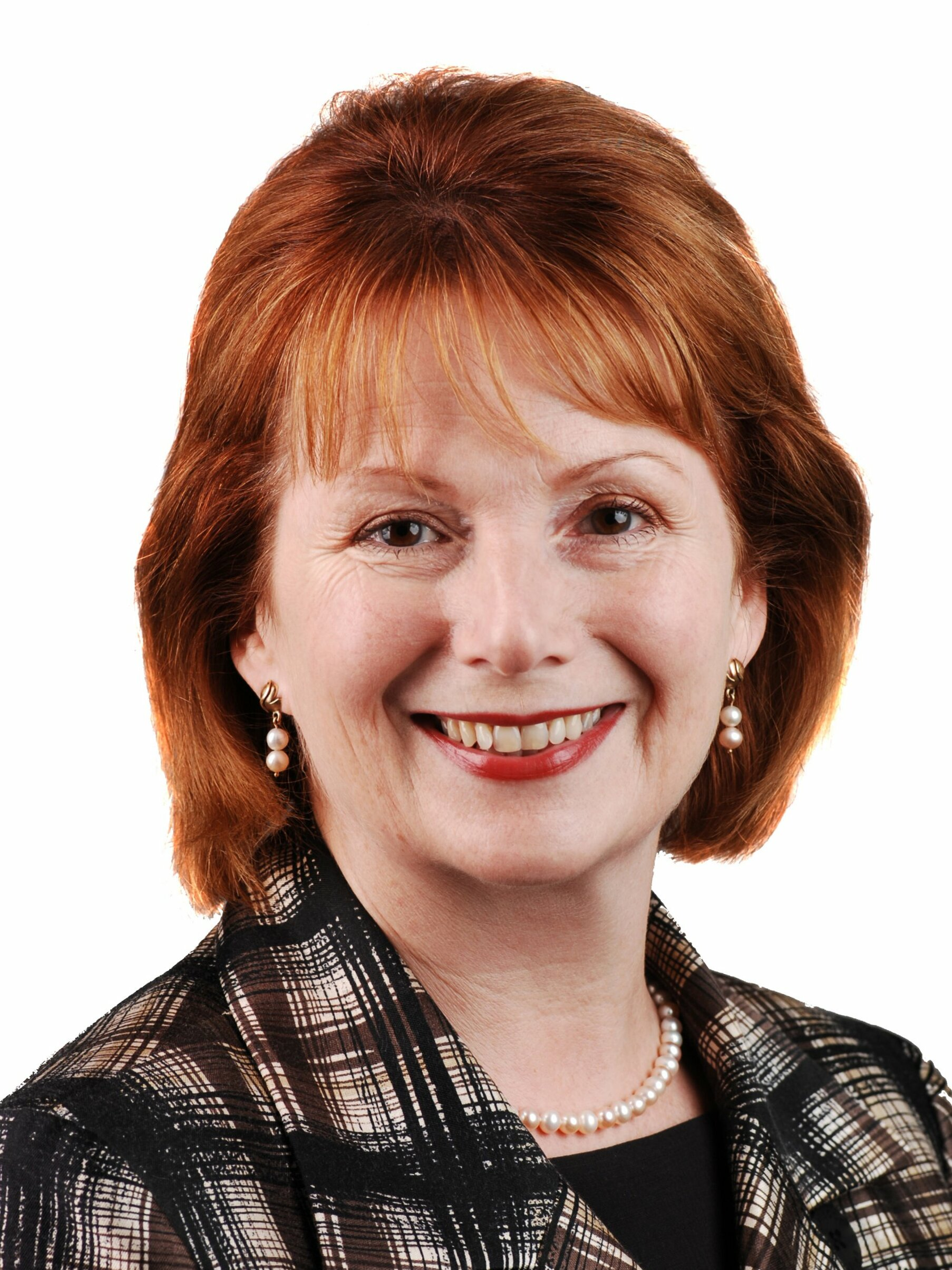
- Official portrait, 2007

Secretary of State for Communities and Local Government
- In office 28 June 2007 – 5 June 2009
- Prime Minister: Gordon Brown
- Preceded by: Ruth Kelly
- Succeeded by: John Denham

Minister without portfolio
- In office 5 May 2006 – 28 June 2007
- Prime Minister: Tony Blair
- Preceded by: Ian McCartney
- Succeeded by: The Baroness Warsi (Note: Office vacant between 28 June 2007 and 12 May 2010.)

Chair of the Labour Party
- In office 5 May 2006 – 24 June 2007
- Leader: Tony Blair
- Preceded by: Ian McCartney
- Succeeded by: Harriet Harman
Junior ministerial offices
Minister of State for Policing, Security and Community Safety
In office 13 June 2003 – 5 May 2006
Prime Minister	Tony Blair
Preceded by	John Denham
Succeeded by	Tony McNulty
Parliamentary Under-Secretary of State for Health
In office 11 June 2001 – 13 June 2003
Prime Minister	Tony Blair
Preceded by	Gisela Stuart
Succeeded by	Stephen Ladyman

Member of Parliament for Salford and Eccles Salford (1997–2010)
- In office 1 May 1997 – 30 March 2015
- Preceded by: Stanley Orme
- Succeeded by: Rebecca Long-Bailey

Personal details
- Born: Hazel Anne Blears; 14 May 1956 (age 70) Salford, Lancashire, England
- Party: Labour
- Spouse: Michael Halsall
- Education: Trent Polytechnic; College of Law

Hazel Anne Blears (born 14 May 1956) is a British former Labour Party politician, who served as the Member of Parliament (MP) successively for the constituencies of Salford and Salford and Eccles between 1997 and 2015.

One of 101 female Labour MPs elected at the 1997 general election, Blears served in the Cabinet as Minister without Portfolio and Chair of the Labour Party between 2006 and 2007, and Secretary of State for Communities and Local Government from 2007 to 2009, before resigning as a result of the expenses scandal. Commenting on her resignation, Gordon Brown said that Blears had made an "outstanding contribution" to public life.

Blears was re-elected in 2010 and remained a backbencher, before standing down at the 2015 election.

== Early life and education ==
Hazel Blears was born in Salford, Lancashire on 14 May 1956, the daughter of Arthur Blears, a maintenance fitter. A five-year old Blears appeared as an extra in iconic English film A Taste of Honey, bouncing a ball in the opening credits.

Blears was educated at Worsley Wardley Grammar School in Wardley, Worsley and then Eccles College on Chatsworth Road in Ellesmere Park, Eccles. She went to Trent Polytechnic in Nottingham (now known as Nottingham Trent University), graduating with a BA (Hons) degree in law, and later, the Chester College of Law in 1977.

== Parliamentary career ==
Described by journalist Michael White as a "ferociously effective networker", Blears stood in Tatton in 1987 against Neil Hamilton and in 1992 in Bury South where she lost by 788 votes. At the 1997 general election she was elected as the Labour MP for Salford, her home seat.

After the election she became the Parliamentary Private Secretary (PPS) to the Minister of State at the Department of Health Alan Milburn until 1998. She spent ten months in 1999 as PPS to then Chief Secretary to the Treasury Andrew Smith.

In the run-up to the 2001 general election, Blears was a member and later deputy head of the Labour Party campaign team, a group of backbenchers tasked with campaigning around the country. This raised her national profile.

At the 2010 general election, parliamentary constituencies for Salford and Eccles were restructured, with Blears's constituency being abolished. She defeated Ian Stewart in the selection contest to be the Labour Parliamentary Candidate for the new parliamentary constituency of Salford and Eccles, and was elected.

During her parliamentary career, she has acquired the nickname "Chipmunk". Fraser Nelson, writing in The Spectator, has subsequently dubbed her "the Iron Chipmunk", a play on the phrase "Iron Lady", often used to describe Margaret Thatcher.

=== Ministerial career ===
Following the 2001 general election, Blears entered Tony Blair's government as the Parliamentary Under Secretary of State at the Department of Health, responsible for Public Health. In this job she launched the Government's "5-a-day" campaign to get people to eat more fruit and vegetables.

Blears was promoted in 2003 to Minister of State for Policing, Security and Community Safety. She was elected to the National Executive Committee of the Labour Party in 2003. After the 2005 general election, on 7 June 2005 she became a Member of the Privy Council. In a cabinet reshuffle following council elections on 4 May 2006, Tony Blair appointed her Party Chair, replacing Ian McCartney.

==== Secretary of State for Communities and Local Government ====
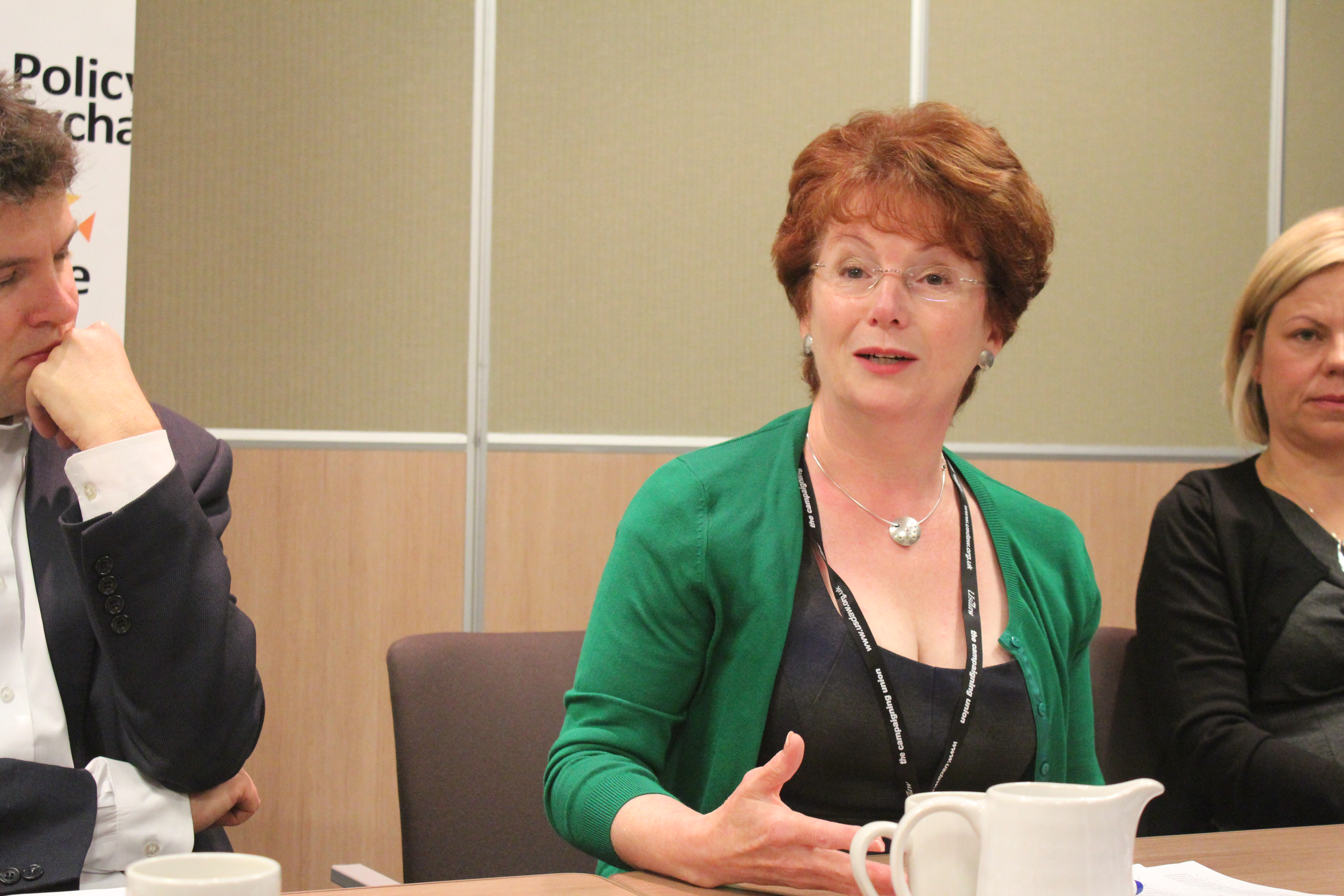
Blears in 2013

On 28 June 2007, the new Prime Minister Gordon Brown appointed Blears as Secretary of State for Communities and Local Government, replacing Ruth Kelly. In April 2008, it was rumoured that Brown was planning a summer reshuffle in which Blears would be demoted. However, when the reshuffle occurred in the autumn, she retained the position.

In May 2008, Blears mistakenly commented on BBC's Question Time that there were 3 million people unemployed in the United Kingdom when Labour came to power in 1997 (the official figure was 1,602,500).

==== Deputy Leadership candidate ====
On 24 February 2007, she announced her candidacy for the election for Deputy Leader of the Labour Party, making her one of six candidates for the job formerly held by John Prescott. She came last out of six candidates. Harriet Harman won the election on 24 June 2007.

==== Resignation from the cabinet ====
On 3 June 2009, the day before the 2009 European and local elections, Blears announced she would resign from the cabinet at the next reshuffle. The media noted how, on the day her resignation was announced, she wore a brooch bearing the message "rocking the boat" On 12 June 2009, she expressed her regret at the manner and timing of her resignation in an interview with the Manchester Evening News. Her resignation was one of several from the Labour cabinet that summer, with the government's difficulties compounded by poor results in the European elections and poor opinion poll results which were largely blamed on the recession and rising unemployment.

=== Ethnic minorities ===
In March 2005, while Home Office minister with responsibility for counter-terrorism, Blears implied that section 44 of the Terrorism Act would disproportionally affect Muslims. In response to this and to her seeming endorsement of it, Ray Powell, President of the National Black Police Association, described the minister's language as "intemperate and inconsiderate". "I think it is wrong of her to say they should accept it is used disproportionately. That comment would not be helpful and does not instill confidence within the Muslim community".

In August 2005, Blears said that the adoption of hyphenated titles such as 'Asian-British' or 'Indian-British' as a means of 'rebranding' ethnic minorities was "among a range of ideas" brought up in meetings with Muslim and other community groups. This proposal was quickly withdrawn by the Home Office, as the government moved to distance itself from the idea.

=== Hospital closures ===
In 2006, Blears joined in protests against the closure of hospital departments in her constituency, even though these closures were consistent with the policies of the government of which she was a senior member. Health Emergency's head of campaigns Geoff Martin said, "there are 29 hospitals up and down the country facing the immediate threat of cuts and closure to key services in 2007. Will Hazel Blears be joining demonstrators on the streets in each of those areas or is this just a classic case of 'not in my back yard'"?

=== Expenses scandal ===
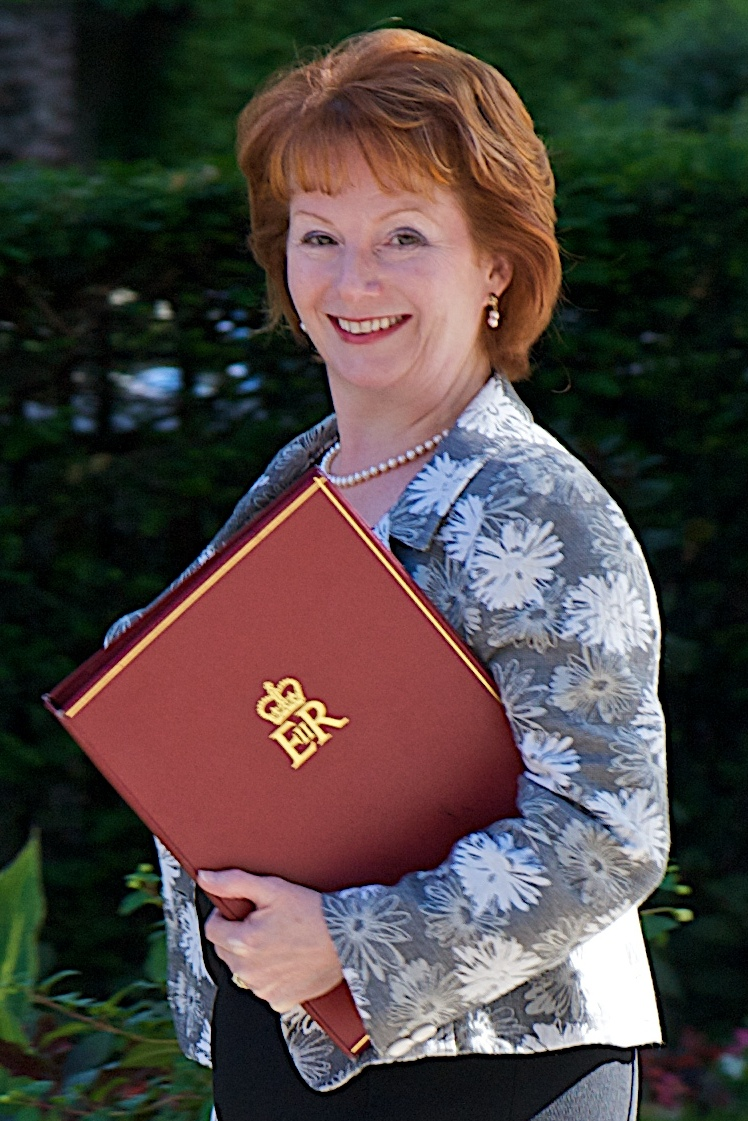
Blears in June 2009

In May 2009, The Telegraph reported that Blears had claimed the maximum allowable expenses, within one pound, for three properties, as well as for stays in hotels. She had also claimed £4,874 on furniture, £899 on a new bed and £913 on a new TV, the second such TV in under a year, and the maximum £400 a month in groceries, and many were said to be outraged that she was not prosecuted. Further, Blears had not paid capital gains tax on profit from the sale of a London flat. The property was registered as her main residence with HM Revenue and Customs, but Blears had been claiming MPs' second home expenses relating to the flat. She had made a £45,000 profit on its sale without paying capital gains tax.

On 12 May, she volunteered to pay the £13,332 capital gains tax she had avoided on the sale of her second home. It was subsequently claimed that Gordon Brown had ordered her to repay the sum.

In Salford, her constituency, she was met by a number of angry protesters and stayed in a local hotel rather than at home.

Following an investigation by Sir Thomas Legg, Blears was told to repay £225 in expenses in relation to a glass shelving unit for her London flat.

=== 2010–2015: In opposition ===
Blears was a member of the Intelligence and Security Committee of Parliament from September 2010 to March 2015. Blears presented the committee's report on privacy and security, carried out following Edward Snowden's revelations about global surveillance by the security agencies, to the media.

In 2013, Blears launched the Kids without Connections work experience programme. The programme aims to encourage local businesses across Salford and Eccles to offer work experience to young people aged between 16 and 24 years. The placements were not paid but were a way of providing experience to people unemployed or seeking work. As a direct result of the project 16 of the 42 initial young people on the programme found a full-time job or apprenticeship immediately after the scheme had ended.

She stood down at the 2015 general election, as she had announced.

== Later career ==
In May 2015, Blears became a director of The Co-operative Group and a member of the Risk and Audit Committee and Nominations Committee, for which she was paid £60,000 a year for which she was expected a minimum of one or two days' work per month. In 2016 Blears was appointed Chair of the Social Investment Business. She has also had roles as Chair of the Institute for Dementia at the University of Salford, as an ambassador for the Alzheimer's Society, and as a trustee of the Social Mobility Foundation. In September 2020, Blears was appointed as "Social Value Specialist" for the Nuclear Decommissioning Authority.

== Personal life ==
She married Michael Halsall in 1989. They have no children.

In 2005 Blears was a member of a parliamentary tap-dancing troupe known as the Division Belles (a play on the term "division bell"). Other members included Caroline Flint, Beverley Hughes, Laura Moffatt, Meg Munn, Joan Ryan and Dari Taylor.

== Notes ==
Parliament of the United Kingdom
Preceded by Stan Orme	Member of Parliament for Salford; 1997–2010	Constituency abolished
New constituency	Member of Parliament for Salford and Eccles; 2010–2015	Succeeded by Rebecca Long-Bailey
Political offices
Preceded by Ian McCartney	Minister without Portfolio; 2006–2007	Vacant Title next held by The Baroness Warsi
Preceded by Ruth Kelly	Secretary of State for Communities and Local Government; 2007–2009	Succeeded by John Denham
Party political offices
Preceded by Ian McCartney	Chairman of the Labour Party; 2006–2007	Succeeded by Harriet Harman
