= St Mary's Roman Catholic Cemetery, Wardley =

English cemetery

St Mary's Roman Catholic Cemetery
- Wardley Cemetery
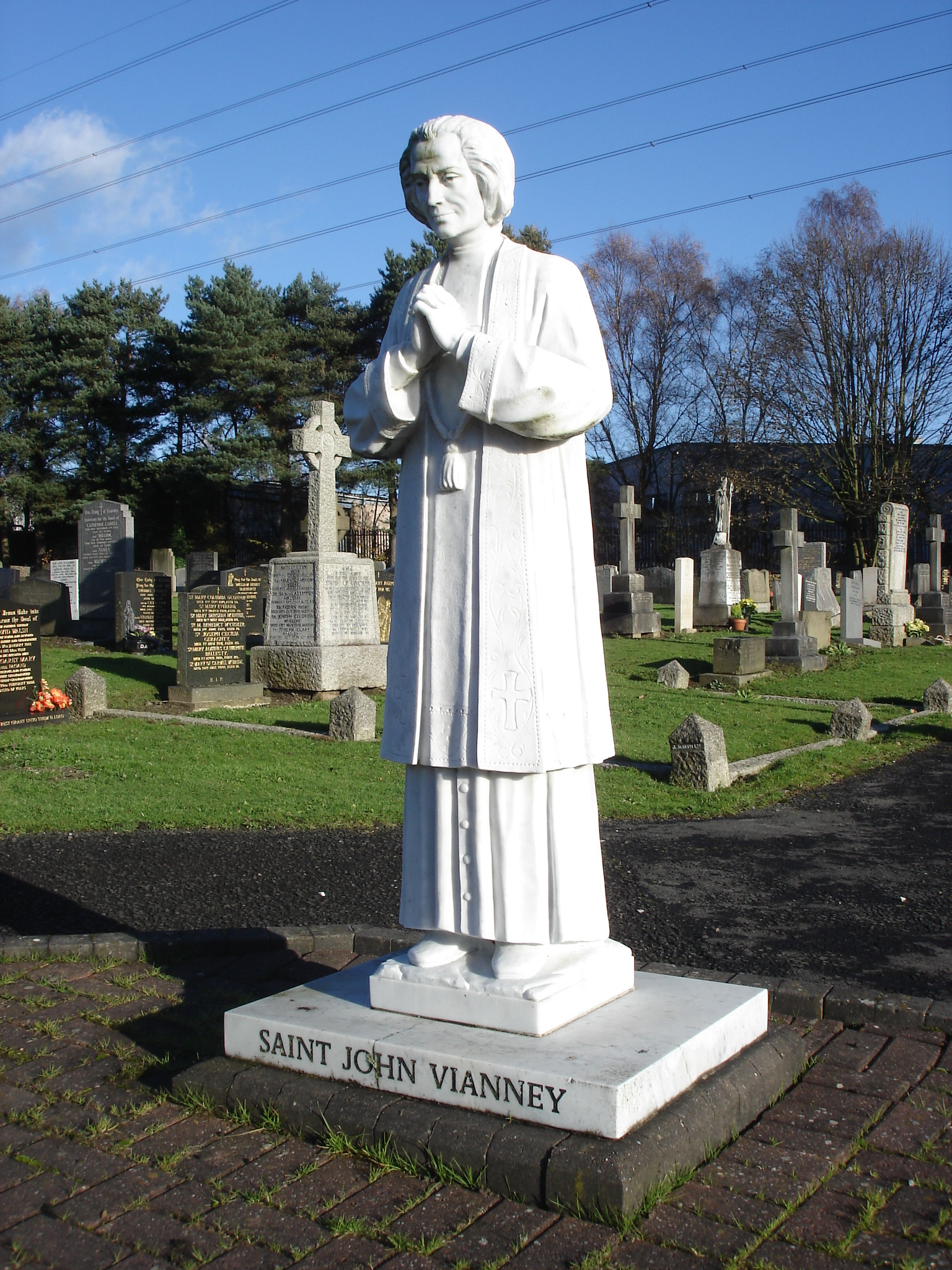
- Statue of St John Vianney
- Interactive map of St Mary's Roman Catholic Cemetery

Details
- Established: 1935
- Location: Salford, Greater Manchester
- Country: England
- Coordinates: 53.515°N 2.364°W
- Owned by: Roman Catholic Diocese of Salford
- Find a Grave: St Mary's Roman Catholic Cemetery

St Mary's Roman Catholic Cemetery or Wardley Cemetery is a cemetery in Wardley, a suburban area of the City of Salford, in Greater Manchester, England. It is close to Swinton, Worsley, and Walkden. It is one of two large cemeteries in the Roman Catholic Diocese of Salford.

Wardley Hall, a grade II listed medieval manor house next to the cemetery, is the official residence of the Roman Catholic bishop of Salford. The cemetery is locally listed as a heritage asset by the Salford City Council and the Greater Manchester Local Heritage List.

== History ==
The land for the cemetery was purchased by the Catholic church in 1930. The previous owner, Captain Thomas Nuttall, was eager to sell after plans were drawn up for the construction of the large new East Lancashire Road through his estate. The purchase was agreed with Bishop Thomas Henshaw for £7,500, and Wardley Hall and its surrounding land were gifted with the sale. Burials began in 1935.

== Facilities and services ==
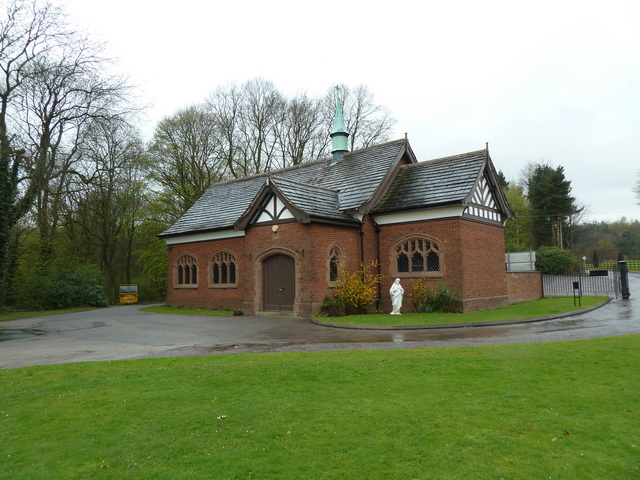
Cemetery chapel

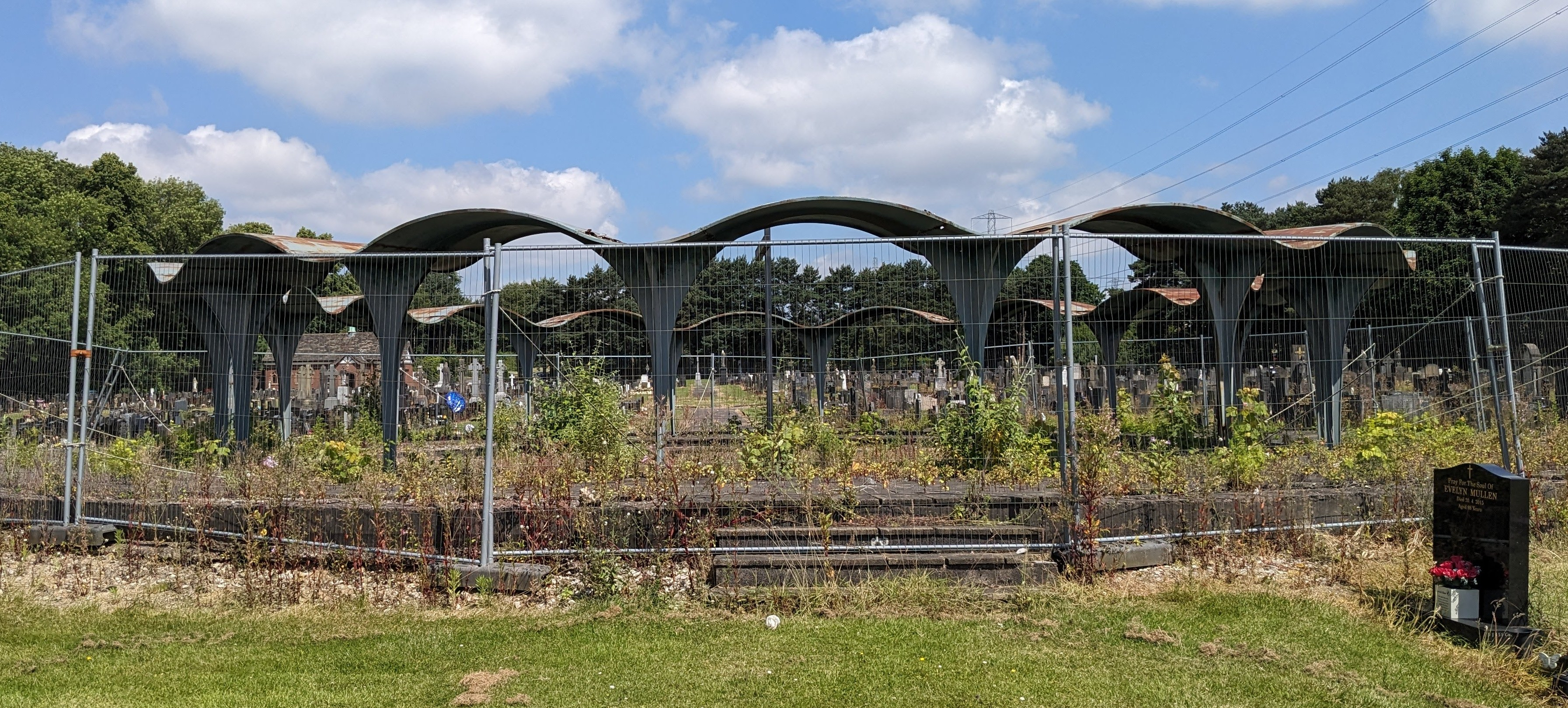
Central fountain

The cemetery has a chapel for conducting services, which dates from 1932. An annual mass is held at the cemetery on the August Bank Holiday. A nearby building outside the gates contains the cemetery office, house and visitor toilets. At the centre of the site is a large circular fountain structure, which has been closed as of 2024.

== Transport ==
The A580 "East Lancashire Road" runs along the south end of the cemetery. The M60 motorway and A6 road also pass nearby. Moorside railway station is approximately one mile away on foot.

== Notable interments ==
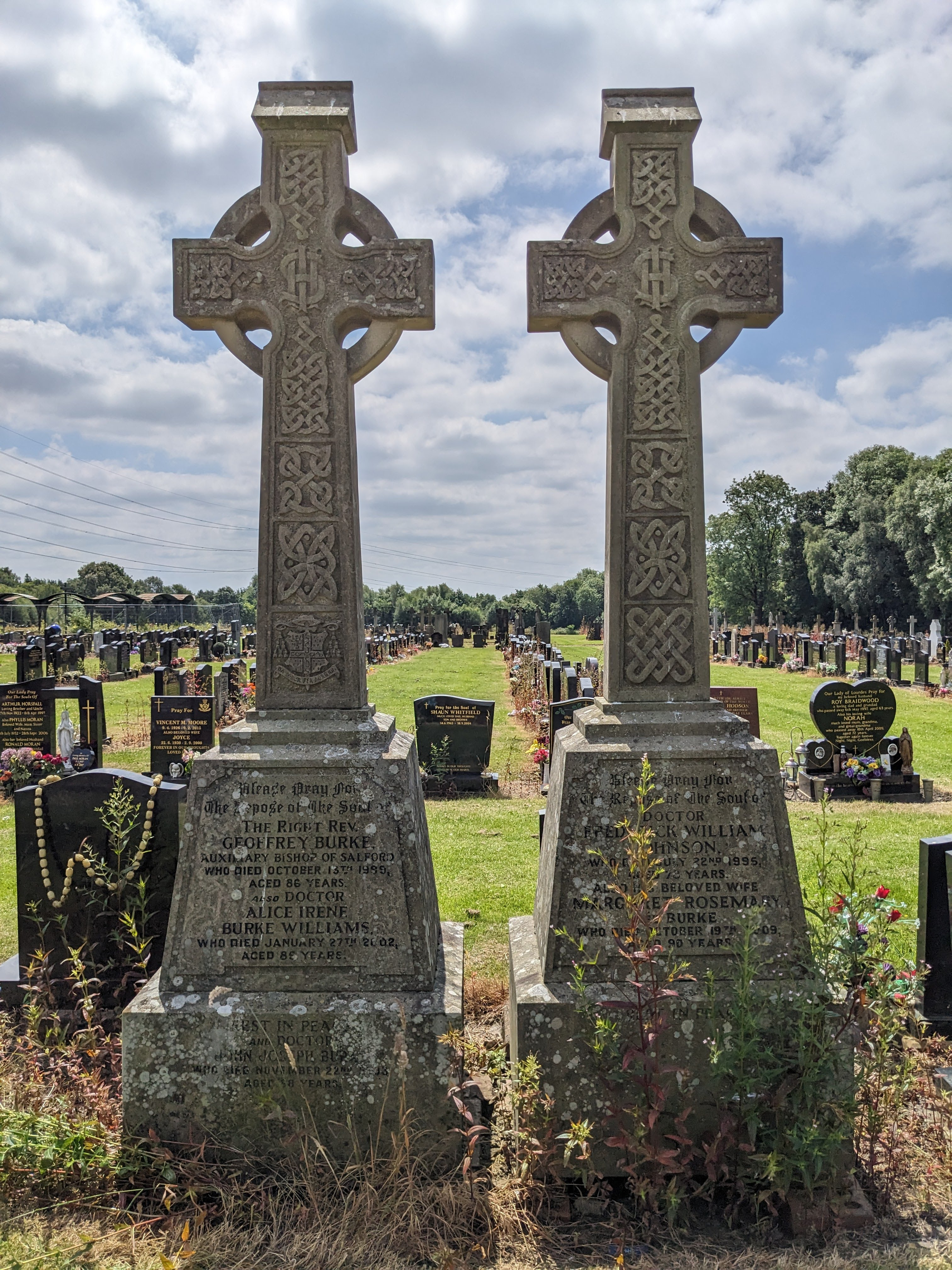
Celtic high cross gravestones including that of Geoffrey Burke

- Thomas Henshaw (1873–1938), fifth Bishop of Salford
- Geoffrey Burke (1913–1999), Auxiliary Bishop of Salford
- Joe Gladwin (1906–1987), actor
- Sir Geoffrey Alan Hulton (1920–1993), fourth and final baronet of the Hulton Baronetcy

=== Second World War graves ===
The cemetery contains the graves of 15 identified service personnel who died during the Second World War.

Five of the 14 nurses killed in an air raid on Salford Royal Hospital during the Manchester Blitz, four of whom were Irish, were buried together in the cemetery.
