= Joe Gladwin =

English actor (1906–1987)

Joe Gladwin KSG
- Gladwin as Wally Batty in Last of the Summer Wine
- Born: Joseph Gladwin; 22 January 1906; Ordsall, Salford, Lancashire, England
- Died: 11 March 1987 (aged 81); Manchester, England
- Resting place: St. Mary's Roman Catholic Cemetery (Wardley), Salford, Greater Manchester, England
- Other name: Joe Gladwyn
- Occupation: Actor
- Years active: 1957–1987
- Spouse: Lily Wynne (m. 1933)

Joseph Gladwin KSG (22 January 1906 – 11 March 1987) was an English actor, best known for his roles as Fred Jackson in Coronation Street, Stan Hardman in Nearest and Dearest, and Wally Batty in the world's longest-running sitcom, Last of the Summer Wine (1975–1987).

== Biography ==
Gladwin was born at 44 Tatton Street in the Ordsall district of Salford, Lancashire, the son of Joseph and Elizabeth (née Dooley). His father was a coal dealer. Gladwin was baptised on 28 January 1906 at Mount Carmel Roman Catholic Church, Ordsall, and educated at the parish school. He married Lily Anne Wynne on 30 December 1933 at Mount Carmel Church. Gladwin was appointed a Papal Knight (of the Order of St. Gregory the Great) for his charity work.

Before his professional career took off, Gladwin performed with The Decoys during World War II, a concert party based in Chorlton-cum-Hardy, Manchester. This concert party (ENSA) entertained the troops in hospitals and elsewhere. At the time, Gladwin was a driver for a company delivering medicines to chemists (from an interview with Joyce Bishop, 3 November 2018, daughter of one of the members of The Vocals).

Gladwin served as northern representative of the Catholic Stage Guild. Gladwin had a lifelong rhotacism.

== Career ==
Gladwin worked as a "feed" for Dave Morris for twelve years beginning in 1950. He appeared on British television from the 1960s onwards, making notable appearances in Z-Cars, Dixon of Dock Green and The Artful Dodger. He had a recurring role in Coronation Street between 1961 and 1966 as Fred Jackson, owner of the local fish and chip shop. Between 1968 and 1973 Gladwin appeared in Nearest and Dearest as Stan Hardman, a long-time worker in Pledge's Pickle factory, set in Colne, Lancashire and starring alongside Hylda Baker and Jimmy Jewel. He also appeared in Last of the Summer Wine from 1975 to 1986 and had completed work on the show's ninth series and 1986 Christmas special before his death.

His film credits included appearances in Three Hats for Lisa (1965), Charlie Bubbles (1967), Work Is a Four-Letter Word (1968), The Reckoning (1969), the film version of Nearest and Dearest (1972), Escape from the Dark (1976) and Yanks (1979).

Year	Title	Role
1959	The Artful Dodger	Cedric Butterworth
1961, 1963–1964, 1966	Coronation Street	Fred Jackson
1964	Mary Barton	Job Legh
1968 to 1973	Nearest and Dearest	Stan Hardman
1971	Budgie - Series 1 Episode 7- Best Mates	Maguire
1975	The Sweeney	Stanley Proctor
1975	The Wackers	Joe Farrell
1975 to 1976	Striker	Harry
1975 to 1987	Last of the Summer Wine	Wally Batty
1976	BBC2 Playhouse	Joe (Episode:- "The Chauffeur")(Episode:- "The Chauffeur")
1978	The Losers	Dennis Breene
1979	Thundercloud	Porter
1979	How's Your Father?	Mr Blenkinsop
1980	All Creatures Great and Small	Len Hamson
1980	Born and Bred	Joe Jaikes
1981	Honky Tonk Heroes	Albert
1981	Funny Man	Autograph hunter
1981	The Merchant of Venice	Old Gobbo
1981, 1984	Juliet Bravo	Mr. Long (Episode:- Gorgeous); Mr. Small (Episode:- Lost and Found; as Joe Gladwyn)
1982	Tales of the Unexpected	Heeney

== Death ==
Gladwin died on 11 March 1987, aged 81, in the Greater Manchester Hospital in Crumpsall. He had been ill for some time with bronchial cancer, which resulted in bronco-pneumonia complications. He is buried at St Mary's Roman Catholic Cemetery in Wardley.
