= George Costigan =

British actor

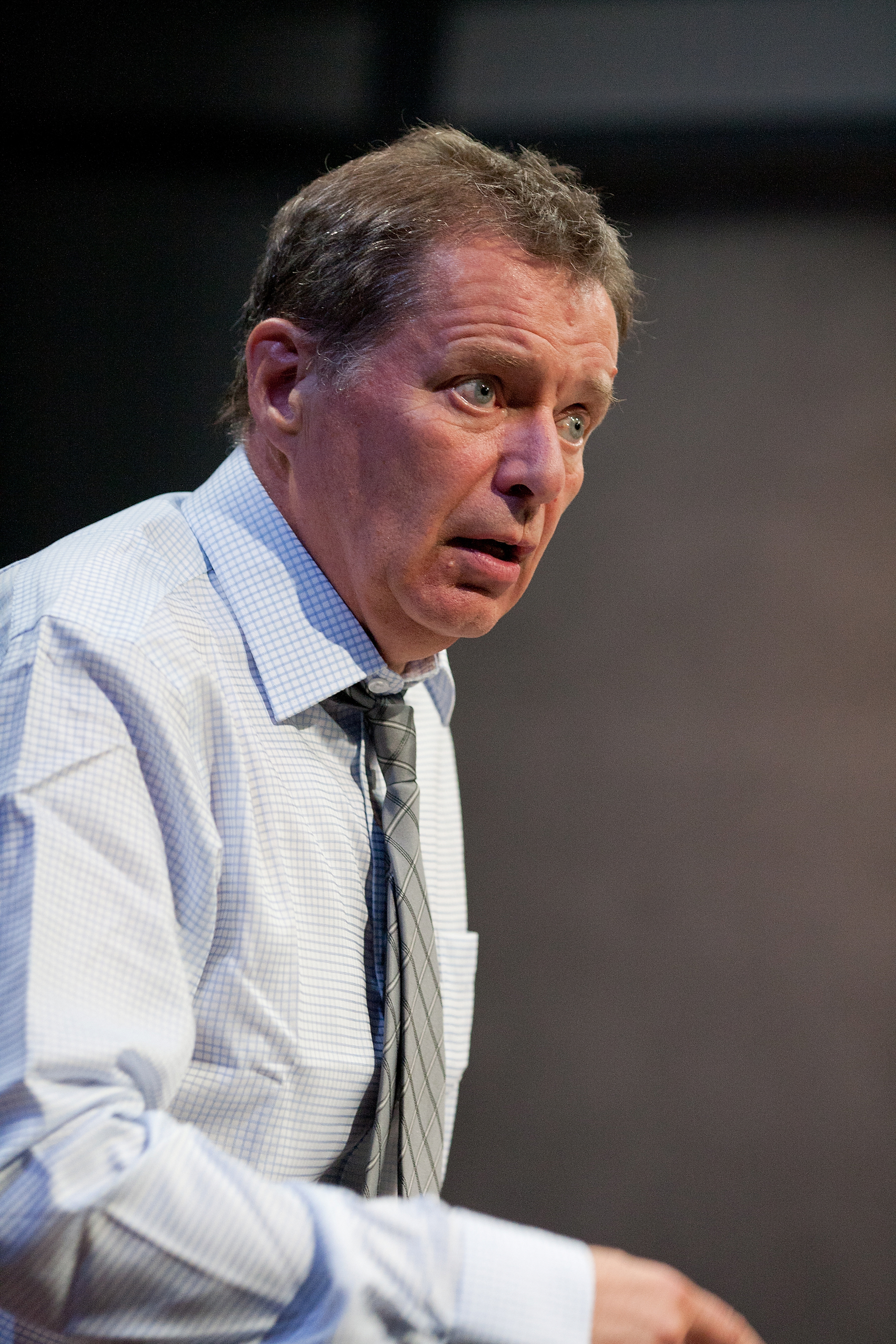
- Born: George J. Costigan; 8 August 1947 (age 78); Portsmouth, Hampshire, England
- Occupation: Actor
- Years active: 1975–present

George J. Costigan (born 8 August 1947) is an English actor who is best known for portraying Bob in the 1987 film Rita, Sue and Bob Too and for roles in TV series such as Happy Valley and So Haunt Me.

== Early life ==
Born in Portsmouth, Hampshire, Costigan grew up in Salford, Greater Manchester. After attending St Augustine's C of E Primary School on Bolton Road in Pendlebury, he went to Wardley Grammar School on Mardale Avenue in Wardley near Swinton.

== Career ==
Costigan has appeared regularly on television since 1978. He played Tom Towers in the 1982 series of The Barchester Chronicles, an adaption of the novels by Anthony Trollope, and in the same year starred as Tom Hannaway in a BBC adaptation of Fame is the Spur.

In 1984, he appeared as lead guest actor playing Wilson Kemp in "The Greek Interpreter", an episode of the successful Granada TV series The Adventures of Sherlock Holmes, and, in the same year, also played Philip the Bastard in the BBC Television Shakespeare production of The Life and Death of King John (alongside Leonard Rossiter in the title role).

In 1986, he played the lead role of Bob, an adulterous businessman in the small independent comedy film Rita, Sue and Bob Too, which has since achieved cult status. He has since starred or featured in many television productions, including The Adventures of Sherlock Holmes (channelling Peter Lorre) Kavanagh QC, Coogan's Run, Connie, A Touch of Frost, Inspector Morse, Murder Most Horrid, London's Burning, The Bill, The Long Firm, City Central, Vera, Dalziel and Pascoe, The Ruth Rendell Mysteries, The Inspector Lynley Mysteries, The Beiderbecke Connection, New Tricks, Linda Green and Casualty. His film work includes Calendar Girls and Shirley Valentine.

In 2001, he had a recurring role in Holby City as James Campbell, a bereaved father, who is later revealed in the season three finale, to be the killer of series regular Victoria Merrick (Lisa Faulkner).

Costigan starred as real life detective DCI Joe Mounsey in ITV1s See No Evil: The Moors Murders a two-part British television serial that tells the story of the background of the Moors murders

He appeared in the role of Max Capricorn in the 2007 Doctor Who Christmas special, "Voyage of the Damned".

In 1974, he joined the Liverpool Everyman Theatre Company, where he met his second wife, Jooles, remaining with the company for eight years. Whilst at the Everyman he appeared as Bert in the Willy Russell musical John, Paul, George, Ringo and Bert alongside Trevor Eve, Anthony Sher, and Bernard Hill.

In the theatre, he created the role of Mickey Johnstone in Willy Russell's musical Blood Brothers, originally at the Liverpool Playhouse, and later at the Lyric Theatre, London. He then played the role of Estragon in Samuel Beckett's play Waiting for Godot at the Manchester Library Theatre for three weeks from 16 February to 8 March 2008, and played Willy Loman in Arthur Miller's Death of a Salesman at York Theatre Royal in November 2008. In December 2009, it was announced that he is to join Emmerdale as a friend of Rodney Blackstock. He made his debut in the soap in March 2010 and his last appearance was shown on 23 July 2010. In April 2010, he starred as Alan, the ex-husband of Christine, Inspector Frost's new love interest in A Touch of Frost. In 2012, he appeared in William Shakespeare's King Lear at the Citizens Theatre, Glasgow, alongside David Hayman. In 2014, he appeared in Happy Valley. He resumed the role, Nevison Gallagher, in the 2016 series. He also starred in the hit TV series Line of Duty as Patrick Fairbank.

In July 2016, he played Sir Ethelred in the BBC's 3-part television adaptation of Joseph Conrad's 1907 novel The Secret Agent.

His first novel The Single Soldier was published in Spring 2017. The second and third parts of the trilogy, The Soldier's Home are also published via Urbane Publishers.

In 2026 he played Vladimir in Waiting for Godot at the Citizens Theatre in Glasgow and the Octagon Theatre in Bolton.

== Personal life ==
His partner is the writer Julia North, with whom he wrote a 1990 episode of Birds of a Feather. They have three sons. He supports Everton F.C.

== Filmography ==
=== Film ===
Year	Title	Role	Notes
1975	Jenny Can't Work Any Faster	Brian	TV film
1978	The Sailor's Return	Harry Target	
1980	Bloody Kids	School Master 2	TV film
1981	Somewhere More Central	Hotel Manager	TV film
1983	Red Monarch	Projectionist	TV film
1984	The Life and Death of King John	Philip	TV film
1986	The Great Paper Chase	Sargeant Jones	TV film
1987	Rita, Sue and Bob Too	Bob	
1989	Shirley Valentine	Dougie	
1993	The Hawk	Stephen Marsh	
1995	A Mind to Murder	Robin Cheeseman	TV film
1998	Girls' Night	Steve	
1998	The Tribe	Micky	
2000	Paranoid	Bryan	Uncredited
2001	Love or Money	Ted	TV film
2002	Stranded	Quirk	TV film
2003	Calendar Girls	Eddie	
2005	Frozen	P.C. Pike	
2007	The Good Samaritan	Ralph Mayhew	TV film
2007	Garage	Dan	
2008	Hancock and Joan	George	TV film
2008	Summer	Mr. Tanner	
2010	The Arbor	Jimmy 'The Wig'	
2010	Hereafter	Foster Father	

=== Television ===
Year	Title	Role	Notes
1977	Second City Firsts	Trevor	Episode: "Fattening Frogs for Snakes"
1978	Pickersgill People	Duggie Butterworth	Episode: "The Sheik of Pickersgill"
1981	Screenplay	Ted	Episode: "Happy Since I Met You"
1982	Play for Today	Nolan	Episode: "Under the Skin"
1982	Fame Is the Spur	Tom Hannaway	Mini-series, 5 episodes
1982	The Barchester Chronicles	Tom Towers	Mini-series, 2 episodes
1983	Widows	Charlie	Mini-series, 4 episodes
1985	Connie	Arnie	Series regular
1985	The Adventures of Sherlock Holmes	Wilson Kemp	Episode: "The Greek Interpreter"
1988	Rockliffe's Babies	Johnny Wilshire	Episode: "Top Man"
1988	The Beiderbecke Connection	D.C. Ben	Mini-series, 4 episodes
1988	London's Burning	David	2 episodes
1989	Bergerac	Oliver Sutton	Episode: "Trenchard's Last Case"
1989	The Jim Henson Hour	Father	Episode: "Monster Maker"
1990	Inspector Morse	Ron Garrett	Episode: "The Infernal Serpent"
1990	Stolen	Terry	3 episodes
1990	Casualty	Robert	Episode: "Results"
1990	London's Burning	Michael	2 episodes
1991	Chimera	Schaffer	Mini-series, 3 episodes
1991	Minder	Billy	2 episodes
1992–1994	So Haunt Me	Peter Rokeby	Series regular
1993	The Riff Raff Element	Vincent	3 episodes
1993	Screenplay	Sean	Episode: "Safe"
1994	Screen Two	Don	Episode: "Sin Bin"
1994	The Ruth Rendell Mysteries	Det. Insp. Manciple	Episode: "Master of the Moor"
1995	Kavanagh QC	Michael Duggan	Episode: "A Family Affair"
1995	Coogan's Run	Barry Parry	Episode: "Get Calf"
1996	Madson	George Dartnell	Episode: #1.2
1996	Murder Most Horrid	Dave Jones	Episode: "Confess"
1997	Hetty Wainthropp Investigates	Wallace Pickering	Episode: "Fisticuffs"
1997	Casualty	Martin Gregory	Episode: "Always on My Mind"
1999	Badger	Moncur	Episode: "The World According to Carp"
2000	City Central	DI Jack Carter	Series regular
2000	The Bill	Roxanne	2 episodes: "Old Enemies" & "New Friends"
2001	Peak Practice	Roy Telford	Episode: "Win Some, Lose Some"
2001	Holby City	James Campbell	3 episodes
2002	Dinotopia	Georgio	Episode: "Making Good"
2002	Linda Green	Brian	Episode: "Like Father"
2002	Stan the Man	Deakin	Episode: #1.5
2004	The Long Firm	DI George Mooney	Mini-series, 4 episodes
2005	Down to Earth	Ken Ferris	Episode: "Cowboys"
2005	Where the Heart Is	Ralph	Episode: "Together"
2005	Rose and Maloney	Marcus Roche	Episode: "Alan Richmond"
2006	Dalziel and Pascoe	Barry Bendelow	Episode: "Glory Days"
2006	The Inspector Lynley Mysteries	Owen Harcourt-Baines	Episode: "Natural Causes"
2006	See No Evil: The Moors Murders	DCI Joe Mounsey	Mini-series, 2 episodes
2006	Casualty	Stephen Gregory MP	2 episodes: "The Edge of Fear" & "In Good Faith"
2007	The Royal	Hugh Etheridge	Episode: "Scabs"
2007	The Whistleblowers	David Durrell	Episode: "No Child Left Behind"
2007	Doctor Who	Max Capricorn	Episode: "Voyage of the Damned"
2008	New Tricks	Dave Dalston	Episode: "Loyalties and Royalties"
2009	Unforgiven	Eddie Ackroyd	Mini-series, 2 episodes
2009	Midsomer Murders	Jack Filby	Episode: "The Creeper"
2010	A Touch of Frost	Allen Moorhead	Episode: "If Dogs Run Free"
2010	Emmerdale	Charlie Haynes	Series regular
2011	Casualty	Father Vincent McConnell	Episode: "Mea Culpa"
2012	Homefront	Sgt. Howard Raveley	Mini-series, 6 episodes
2013	Scott & Bailey	Joe Bevan	3 episodes
2013	The Great Train Robbery	DCS Ernie Millen	Mini-series, 1 episode
2014–2023	Happy Valley	Nevison Gallagher	Series regular
2015	Vera	Bill Telling	Episode: "Old Wounds"
2016	The Secret Agent	Sir Ethelred	Mini-series, 3 episodes
2016, 2021	Line of Duty	Patrick Fairbank	6 episodes
2019, 2022	Gentleman Jack	James Holt	7 episodes
2022	Ridley	Ray Trevice	Episode: "Swansong"
2023	Maryland	Richard	Mini-series, 3 episodes
2023, 2025	The Power of Parker	Dougie	Series 1 & 2; 12 episodes
