= The Artful Dodger (1959 TV series) =

- Genre: Sitcom
- Starring: Dave Morris; Joe Gladwin; Gretchen Franklin; John Barrie
- Country of origin: United Kingdom
- No. of series: 1
- No. of episodes: 6

Production
- Producer: John Ammonds
- Running time: 25 minutes

Original release
- Network: BBC Television Service
- Release: 28 September – 2 November 1959

The Artful Dodger is a black-and-white British TV sitcom starring Dave Morris and Gretchen Franklin. It ran for one series in 1959. It was written by Frank Roscoe and Morris.

== Plot ==
In the radio and television series Club Night, Dave Morris, the comedian, had developed a swaggering, work-shy, know-all character, and The Artful Dodger featured the same character, and his wife Sylvia.

== Cast ==
- Dave Morris as himself
- Joe Gladwin as Cedric Butterworth
- Gretchen Franklin as Sylvia Morris
- John Barrie as Mr Grimshaw

== Episodes ==
1. Episode One: "Work v Manchester City" (28 September 1959)
2. Episode Two: "Going, Going, Gone!" (5 October 1959)
3. Episode Three: "Twist or Bust" (12 October 1959)
4. Episode Four: "Doctor's, or Starter's Orders?" (19 October 1959)
5. Episode Five: "Taxi!" (26 October 1959)
6. Episode Six: "Decorating for Profit!" (2 November 1959)
