= Thurstan Tyldesley =

16th-century English politician

Thurstan Tyldesley (by 1495 – 1554), of Tyldesley and Wardley Hall, near Worsley, Lancashire, was an English politician.

He was a member (MP) of the parliament of England for Lancashire in 1547.
