= Dave Morris (comedian) =

British music hall comedian (1896–1960)

- Signed photo
- Born: David Morris; 5 July 1896; Middlesbrough, Yorkshire, England
- Died: 8 June 1960 (aged 63); Blackpool, England
- Notable work: Club Night (BBC Home Service)

Comedy career
- Medium: Music hall, radio, television

David Morris (5 July 1896 – 8 June 1960) was a British music hall comedian who made a successful transition to radio and television.

== Biography ==
He was born on 5 July 1896, son of Samuel Morris and Lily Reubens. Samuel, a tailor, lived at 110 Wilson Street, Middlesbrough.

His first stage appearance was on 10 December 1908 at the Oxford Playhouse, Middlesbrough and his first London appearance in 1913 at the London Shoreditch. He started with a juvenile troupe, "Phil Reece and his Stable Lads", then as a blackface comic. He was called up into the Army in World War 1 and resumed his stage career in 1918, touring constantly in variety and revue.

He lived in the Blackpool area from the early 1930s, and in 1940 began a thirteen-year run in the resort's summer season shows, starting at the North Pier, as a northern comic in his famous straw hat and very thick glasses. He had extremely bad eyesight as a result of having been gassed in the trenches in World War I and thus was not conscripted for the Second World War. After nine years, he refused to go on playing matinees and transferred to a long run at the Blackpool Palace for George and Alfred Black. He worked as a sketch comic, also doing some stand-up material.

In 1948, he toured with Paradise on Parade after a summer season at the South Pier, Blackpool. In January 1950, he was resident comedian of the BBC North Country variety feature, Variety Fanfare. He also toured with his own stage show, The Dave Morris Show, for several years. In 1950 Joe Gladwin joined him as "Cedric", a 'feed', and stayed with him for ten years.

The radio series Club Night was launched in the BBC Home Service north region on 7 November 1950 where it ran for 52 editions until 6 June 1955. The programme was set in a fictitious workingmen's club "'oop north." With his trademark cigar, straw hat and glasses, Dave Morris was the somewhat loudmouthed 'know all' club treasurer, ably assisted by Gladwin as Cedric and by Liverpool comedian Fred Ferris as 'The Wacker' whose primary ambition seemed to be to scrounge a drink. The scripts were written by Morris with James Casey and Frank Roscoe.

He moved to television for six programmes of the sitcom The Artful Dodger from 28 September to 2 November 1959. The show was based on Club Night and used the character he developed there. It also featured Joe Gladwin as his comic foil.

Morris died in Blackpool in 1960, aged 63. Writer Roger Wilmut said of him:

Morris has been largely forgotten since his death... partly because of his relative lack of appeal in the south [of England], and also because no recordings seem to have survived of him; he was one of the finest northern comedians.
