= St Ambrose Barlow Roman Catholic High School =

St Ambrose Barlow RC High School

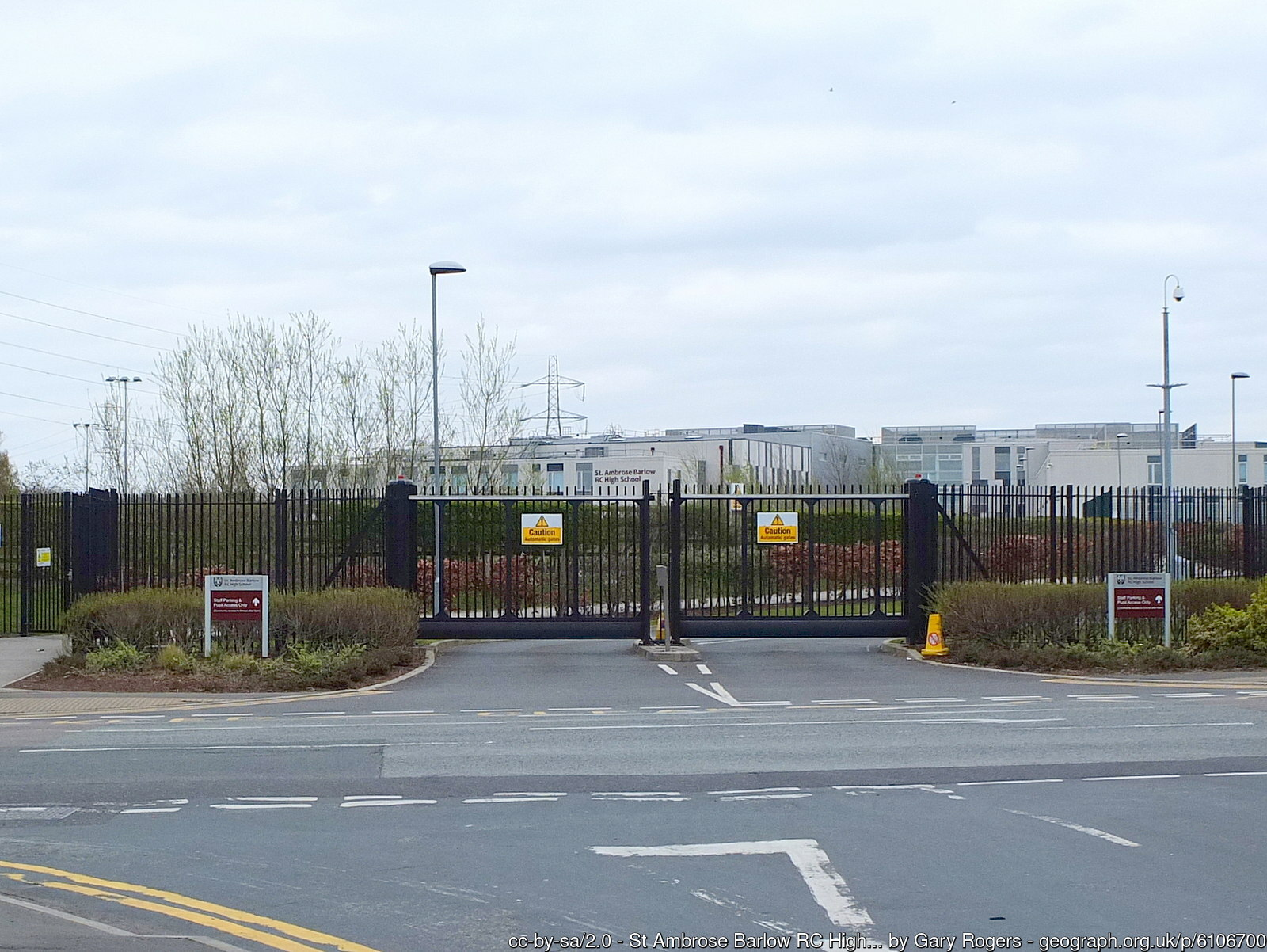
- Front entrance to the school

Location
- 37 Ash Drive; Wardley, Swinton; Salford, Greater Manchester, M27 9QP; England; 53°31′14″N 2°21′31″W

Information
- Type: Voluntary aided school
- Motto: Latin: Crescens discit vivere (Through growing we learn to live)
- Religious affiliation: Roman Catholic
- Established: 1955
- Local authority: Salford
- Department for Education URN: 105989 Tables
- Ofsted: Reports
- Chair of Governors: Vikki Allen
- Headteacher: Ben Davis
- Staff: 81
- Gender: Coeducational
- Age: 11 to 16
- Enrolment: 1,060 pupils
- Houses: St Francis of Assisi, St Oscar Romero, St Bernadette of Lourdes, St Michael the Archangel and St Teresa of Calcutta and St Benedict of Nursia.
- Colours: Maroon and white
- Website: www.stambrosebarlowswinton.org

St Ambrose Barlow RC High School is a secondary school located in Wardley, Greater Manchester, England. The school is named after St Ambrose Barlow, one of the Forty Martyrs of England and Wales.

The school serves a wide range of parishes including St Charles' RC Primary School in Swinton, St Mark's RC Primary School in Pendlebury, St Mary's RC Primary School in Swinton, St Luke's RC Primary School in Irlams o' th' Height, St Edmund's RC Primary School in Little Hulton and Christ the King RC Primary School in Walkden. St Ambrose Barlow has been accredited with many national awards including National Teaching School status, the School Inclusion Award and Dyslexia Friendly Status. The majority of pupils are baptised Roman Catholic.

== History ==
The school was established on land at Shaftesbury Road in nearby Swinton. Building work commenced on Ash Wednesday 1953 and the school entered use in January 1955 with the official opening and blessing on 16 February 1955, by Bishop Henry Vincent Marshall.

In April 2013, the school moved into a new building in Wardley near Swinton. St George's RC High School closed in August 2014 with most pupils transferring to St Ambrose Barlow.

== Ofsted ==
In 2018 an inspection of the school was carried out in accordance with Section 48 of the Education Act 2005. The Diocese of Salford awarded the school "Good" in all seven categories.

At another inspection carried out by Ofsted in 2018, the school was rated as "requires improvement"

Another Ofsted inspection was carried out in March 2022, the school was rated as “requires improvement”

== Leadership ==
Executive Principal, Mrs. C. M. Garside, was awarded CBE for Services to Education in January 2015.

Mr Ben Davis was appointed as the Headteacher of St Ambrose Barlow in 2015.

== In popular culture ==
The old site of St Ambrose Barlow was used for filming the CBBC show 4 O'Clock Club for both interior and exterior shots. The site was first used for filming in the summer of 2013 for the third series which began airing in January 2014. The site continued to be the building for the fictional Elmsmere Manor High School until 2017 when production moved to a former school in Walkden.

The former site was used as the set of Waterloo Road, from January 2023 until February 2024, from Series 14 onwards the school will move to the former Nicholls Campus of The Manchester College as Waterloo Road joined the trust and relocated to a new premises.
