= Wardley Hall =

Building in Greater Manchester, England

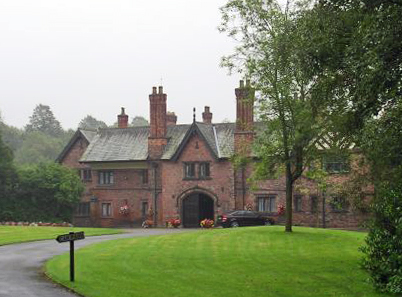
- Interactive map of the Wardley Hall area

General information
- Architectural style: Medieval
- Location: Wardley, Worsley, Salford, Greater Manchester, England
- Coordinates: 53.51589°N 2.36697°W
- Completed: c. 1500

Design and construction
- Designations

Listed Building – Grade I
- Official name: Wardley Hall
- Designated: 29 July 1966
- Reference no.: 1215022

Wardley Hall is an early medieval manor house and a Grade I listed building in the Wardley area of Worsley, Salford, in Greater Manchester (historically within Lancashire). There has been a moat on the site since at least 1292. The current hall dates from around 1500 but was extensively rebuilt in the 19th and 20th centuries. Wardley Hall is the official residence of the Catholic Bishop of Salford.

The skull of St Ambrose Barlow, one of the Forty Martyrs of England and Wales, is preserved in a niche at the top of the main staircase. He was hanged, drawn and quartered at Lancaster on 10 September 1641 after confessing to being a Catholic priest.

== History ==
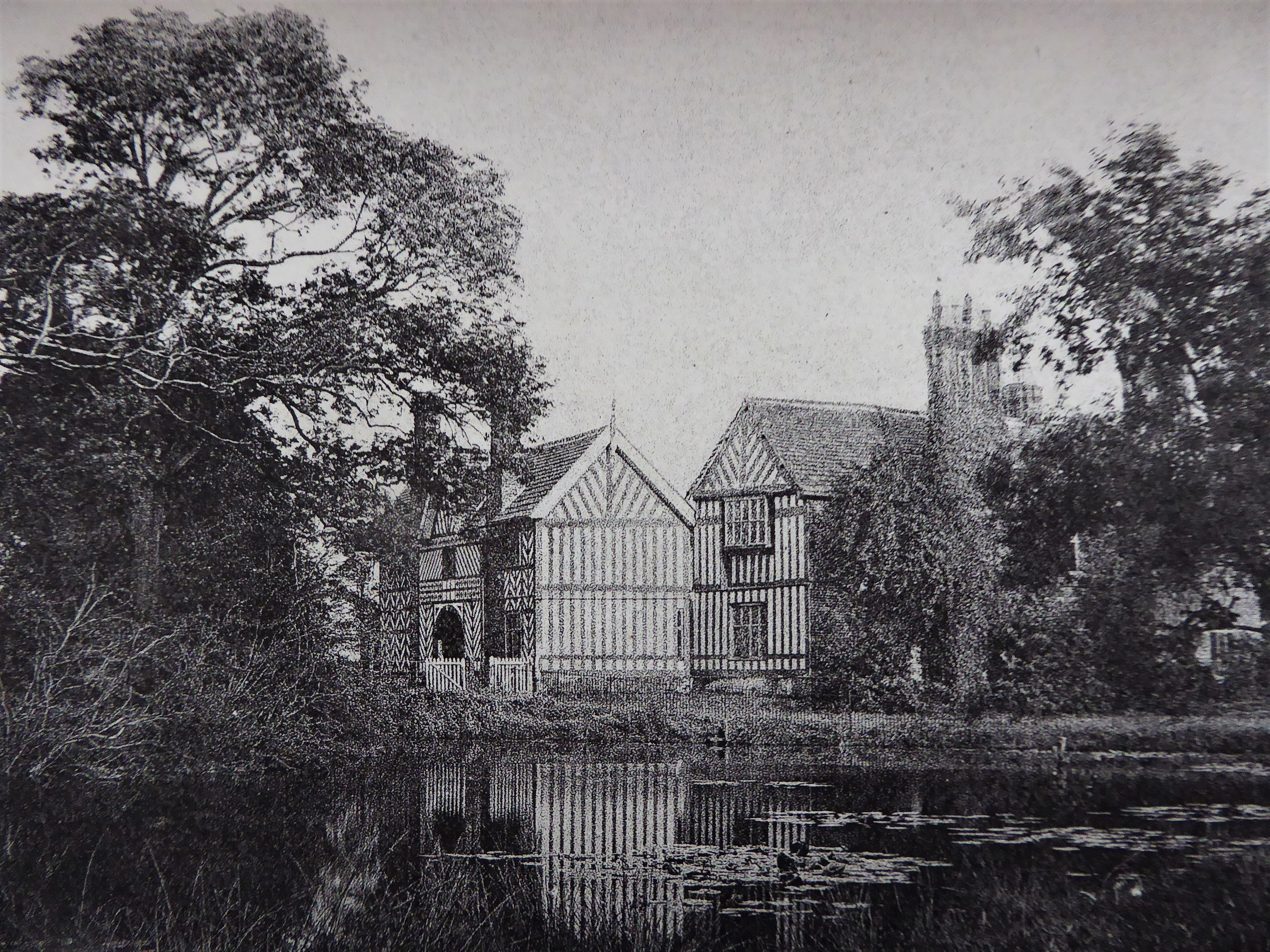
Wardley Hall in 1890

A moat has been on the site of the hall from at least 1292, however the current house was built by Thurstan Tyldesley during the reign of Edward VI, and remained in the Tyldesley family possession until the late 16th-century. Politician and lawyer Roger Downes bought Wardley Hall in 1601, and it was owned by his family for three generations.

In 1760, Francis Egerton, 3rd Duke of Bridgewater bought various estates around Lancashire including Wardley Hall. After his death, his estates, including the hall was left in trust to his nephew George Leveson-Gower, 1st Duke of Sutherland and the latter's son Francis Egerton, 1st Earl of Ellesmere.

Captain Thomas Nuttall began living at the hall from 1919 or 1920, while he was serving with the Royal Field Artillery in Germany. He bought the hall for £5000 in 1924. After learning that the planned East Lancashire Road would cut through the estate, Nuttall decided to move away from the hall. He offered the hall to the Roman Catholic Diocese of Salford in 1928, who declined due to financial restraints. However, after Nuttall's representatives learned that the diocese was looking for land to use as a cemetery to the west of Manchester, they re-entered negotiations. A deal was reached on 12 May 1930, when the diocese agreed to pay £7500 for the hall's surrounding land, with Nuttall offering the hall for free, with a stipulation that it would be preserved and use in accordance with its historic and respected condition. From then onwards, Wardley Hall has been the official residence of the Bishop of Salford.

On 29 July 1966, Wardley Hall was designated as a Grade I listed building.

== Ambrose Barlow's skull ==
Ambrose Barlow was a Roman Catholic priest active in Lancashire during the 17th-century. He frequently visited Wardley Hall to conduct Catholic Mass and to visit the Downes family, his cousins. In March 1641, all Catholic priests in Britain were ordered to leave the country within one month or face the threat of execution. Barlow, who was ill at the time, refused to leave and was arrested after celebrating Easter Mass and was sentenced to death. On 10 September 1641, Barlow was hung, drawn and quartered and boiled in oil. His head was afterwards displayed on a spike outside the Collegiate Church in Manchester. A member of the Downes family managed to acquire the skull and placed it in a niche at the top of the stairs.

During renovations in 1745, one of the hall's chapel walls was removed and the skull was rediscovered in a casket. It was described as having "a goodly set of teeth and having on it a good deal of auburn hair". It is alleged that after its rediscovery, the skull was thrown into the moat; afterwards, the hall was ravaged by intense storms. So, it was ordered that the moat be drained and the skull was returned to its original position. According to legend, whenever the skull is moved, misfortune will fall upon the house.

For a time, the skull was thought to belong to Roger Downes, who is claimed to have died in a drunken fight which severed his head. However, when his body was exhumed from the Downes family vault, his head was intact apart from a small piece missing from his skull. During a forensic examination in 1960, it was identified that the skull belonged to a man aged between 50 and 60 years old, which matches the age of Barlow. It was also determined that a sharp object had been pierced through the head, which matches a spike.

In 1970, Barlow and thirty-nine others who died during the Reformation were canonised by Pope Paul VI.

== Architecture ==
The building is a quadrangular timber framed with a slate roof. It was originally surrounded by a moat, however only a portion still survives on the west side of the hall. The Great Hall is one of the earliest surviving parts of the building and dates from the late 15th or early 16th century.

In 1561, the hall's founder Thurstan Tyldesley was granted an oratory license. He built a private chapel inside the gatehouse to the north of the hall. During the early 17th-century, Wardley Hall contained more than twenty bedrooms.

A major restoration was carried out by John Douglas in 1894. Other restorations were carried out in 1734 and 1904.

== See also ==
- Grade I listed buildings in Greater Manchester
- Listed buildings in Worsley
- List of houses and associated buildings by John Douglas
