= Wardley, Greater Manchester =

Area of Salford, Greater Manchester, England

Coordinates: 53.5190°N 2.3551°W

Wardley
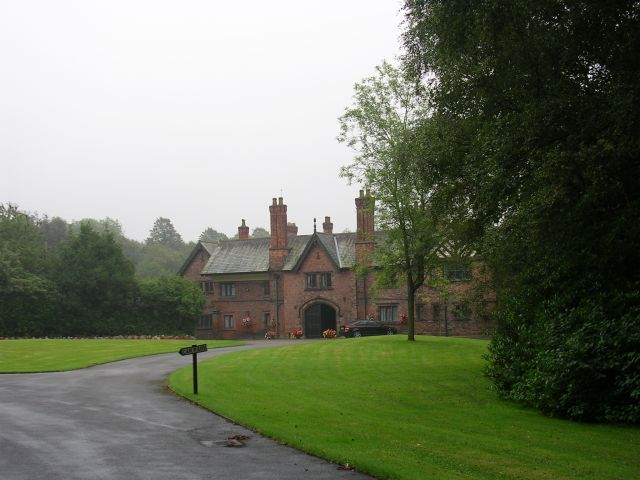
- Wardley Hall is a Grade I listed medieval manor house

- Location within Greater Manchester
- OS grid reference: SD765025
- Metropolitan borough: Salford
- Metropolitan county: Greater Manchester
- Region: North West
- Country: England
- Sovereign state: United Kingdom
- Post town: MANCHESTER
- Postcode district: M27, M28
- Dialling code: 0161
- Police: Greater Manchester
- Fire: Greater Manchester
- Ambulance: North West

Wardley is a suburban area of the City of Salford, in Greater Manchester, England. It borders Linnyshaw, Walkden and Swinton.

== Transport ==
The A580 "East Lancashire Road" passes through the area, and also links to the M61 motorway, of which Wardley is the start. The M60 motorway passes through the area, with links at Junction 14 (from A580 west, no access to A580 east or M60 clockwise) and the M60 and A666(M) meet at Worsley Braided Interchange (at M60 J15 and A666(M) J1). The A6 road (Manchester Road) also passes through the district with frequent bus services (36 and 37) linking Bolton, Farnworth and Walkden with Swinton, Pendleton, Salford and Manchester. There is also an hourly daytime only Monday to Saturday service (484) through Wardley which links Salford Royal Hospital with Prestwich via Eccles, Monton, Wardley, Swinton, Pendlebury, Agecroft and Rainsough.

The district is served by Moorside railway station on Moorside Road, close to the junction with Chorley Road (A6), Swinton. Until 1974 the station was known as Moorside and Wardley. The station is on the Manchester Victoria to Wigan line via Atherton.

== General information ==
Wardley once had three public houses, the Morning Star, Red Lion and Brook Tavern, but the last has now closed down and been converted into a small Tesco store. The Brook Tavern, as its name implied, stood on the Worsley side of Sindsley Brook, the historic boundary between Swinton and Worsley. The Morning Star is run by Joseph Holt's Brewery.

Wardley Hall is the residence of the Roman Catholic bishop of Salford. Adjacent to it is St Mary's Catholic Cemetery, also known as Wardley Cemetery.

Wardley Industrial Estate lies between the A6 (Manchester Road) and the A580 East Lancashire Road.

Wardley means "clearing by a fort", from Old English weard "ward, protection" and leāh "clearing, wood". The name was recorded as Weardeleige in 1148.

=== School ===
- St Ambrose Barlow RC High School
